= Sam & Max: This Time It's Virtual! =

2021 video game

- Promotional art by Steve Purcell
- Developer: HappyGiant
- Publisher: Big Sugar
- Director: Michael Levine
- Designer: Mike Stemmle
- Programmers: Josh Sharp; David Riviera
- Artist: Peter Chan
- Writer: Mike Stemmle
- Composer: Jared Emerson-Johnson
- Series: Sam & Max
- Engine: Unity
- Platforms: Oculus Quest; SteamVR; PlayStation VR
- Release: Oculus Quest; July 8, 2021; SteamVR; September 10, 2021; PlayStation VR; February 23, 2022
- Genre: Action-adventure
- Mode: Single-player

Sam & Max: This Time It's Virtual! is a 2021 virtual reality video game developed by HappyGiant and published by Big Sugar. It is the fifth video game based on the Sam & Max comic book series by Steve Purcell, (Note: Not including the cancelled releases of Sam & Max: Freelance Police and Sam & Max Plunge Through Space) and the first original installment since Sam & Max: The Devil's Playhouse in 2010.

The game was released on the Oculus Quest on July 8, 2021, with the SteamVR version releasing on September 10, 2021 and the PlayStation VR port releasing later on February 23, 2022.

== Gameplay ==
Sam & Max: This Time It's Virtual is a virtual reality action-adventure game controlled through a first-person perspective of a player referred to as Lumpy, a recruit for the Freelance Police, found inside a box in the midst of a battle against a monster. The main game consists of nine minigames that the player can complete. These minigames, all set in an abandoned tardigrade theme park, are assessed and graded from a scale between A and F. Minigames include "Get A Clue" – an escape room, "Fizzball" – a baseball batting minigame using beer cans, and "Bombs Away" – a Bop It-like minigame. Every three minigames that the player completes, Sam, Max, and the player are called by the Commissioner to investigate a case. These cases involve interviewing various characters for a suspected criminal and conclude with a boss battle that usually involve the player requiring to use skills from previous minigames. There are a total of 17 levels in the game. The player can also interact with and throw various objects in Sam and Max's office and during the minigames. Unlike previous titles in the series, the player is able to die and respawn.

== Development and release ==
This Time It's Virtual was developed by HappyGiant, a game studio founded by former LucasArts employee Michael Levine and made up of former LucasArts, Electronic Arts and Activision employees. In an interview, Levine stated that they were able to develop a new Sam & Max VR title as they were the only LucasArts classic franchise that wasn't owned by Disney. Levine mentioned that he was eager to port the franchise into the VR native as such concept would be unique and ambitious for this platform. Levine contacted Steve Purcell, the series co-creator, about creating a new Sam & Max video game, to which he became intrigued with the concept. Purcell would work on the game as a consultant on story, art and game design. HappyGiant also enlisted Mike Stemmle, lead designer of Hit the Road along with Purcell and writer of previous episodes in the series, as the writer and designer for the game, and Peter Chan, artist of many LucasArts adventure games.

The game was initially teased through a game trailer during the Gamescom 2020 Opening Night Live. During this event, it was also announced that David Nowlin, the voice actor for Sam since Save the World, and David Boat, the voice actor for Max since Poker Night 2, were also announced to be reprising their respective roles, with Purcell also voicing as the animatronic head of Duncan B. Dills.

This Time It's Virtual was released on the Oculus Quest on July 8, 2021. The game was originally set for release on that platform on June 2021, however it was delayed to the following month. A demo for the SteamVR version of the game was released on Steam on August 13. The same demo was also presented during the 78th Venice International Film Festival's Venice VR Expanded lineup. New cover art illustrated by Steve Purcell was also shown during the exhibition. The game was later released on SteamVR on September 10, 2021, and on PlayStation VR on February 23, 2022.

== Reception ==
Reception

Aggregate score
Aggregator	Score
Metacritic	PC: 65/100; PS4: 52/100

Review scores
Publication	Score
Push Square	5/10
Android Central	4/5
VRFocus	2/5
Sektor.sk	5.0/10

Sam & Max: This Time It's Virtual! was released to "mixed or average" reception in both PC and PlayStation 4 platforms according to review aggregator website Metacritic. (Note: PC version based on 5 reviews, PS4 based on 5 reviews)

The game was criticized due to its controls and gameplay, noted to be lacking in polish compared to other Sam & Max titles. Reviewers noted how the game suffers from poor collision detection, aiming is glitchy and item manipulation is "a nuisance". Other reviewers noted that the minigames included are too hard and not enjoyable, with Push Square lamenting that all minigames with the exception of the fizzball minigame were not fun, primarily due to the glitches. VRFocus noted that the game lasts only 3-5 hours long with no incentive to replay other minigames to improve rankings.

However, the game was still praised for its writing, humor and soundtrack. Pushsquare commended the heavy use of pop culture references and dark jokes in spite of its technical shortcomings. Other reviewers praised the banter between Sam and Max, praising the voice acting done by David Nowlin and Dave Boat.
