= Telltale Texas Hold'em =

2005 video game

- Developer: Telltale Games
- Publisher: Telltale Games
- Designers: Brendan Q. Ferguson; Kevin Bruner
- Composers: Jerry Logas and the Pier 23 Reunion Band
- Engine: Telltale Tool
- Platform: Microsoft Windows
- Release: February 11, 2005
- Genre: Card game
- Mode: Single player

Telltale Texas Hold'em is a 2005 poker video game released by Telltale Games. The game was hinted at by Telltale Games before release when they stated that they would release a mini game or two before the announcement of their first adventure game. Telltale Texas Hold'Em was released by Telltale to examine the benefits of digital distribution. The game would serve as the basis for Telltale's other poker games, Poker Night at the Inventory and Poker Night 2.

== Plot ==
Harry Weinhead, Boris Krinkle, Theodore Dudebrough, and Grandma Shakey compete against the player in the Telltale Texas Hold'Em tournament, a fictional poker tournament held in Las Vegas, Nevada.

Boris Krinkle looks very much like Leonard Steakcharmer, a minor antagonist/character in Sam & Max Save the World and Sam & Max Beyond Time and Space (and Carter Coleman voices both characters). This fact is mentioned by both Theodore in Telltale Texas Hold'em and by Max in Sam & Max Save the World.

== Reception ==
Telltale Texas Hold'em was named "indie game of the month" by PC Zone magazine in June 2005.
