= Sam & Max =

American media franchise

- Artwork of Sam (left) and Max (right)
- Created by: Steve Purcell
- Years: 1987–present

Print publications
- Comics: Original run (1987–97); Webcomics (2005–2007); Collections (1995 and 2007)

Films and television
- Animated series: The Adventures of Sam & Max: Freelance Police (1997–98)

Games
- Video games: Sam & Max Hit the Road (1993); Sam & Max Save the World (2006–07); Sam & Max Beyond Time and Space (2007–08); Sam & Max: The Devil's Playhouse (2010); Poker Night at the Inventory (2010)^{*}; Poker Night 2 (2013)^{*}; Sam & Max: This Time It's Virtual (2021)

Official website
- samandmax.net

Sam & Max is an American media franchise about Sam and Max, a pair of anthropomorphic vigilante private investigators. The characters, who occupy a universe that parodies American popular culture, were created by Dave Purcell before being developed by his brother Steve Purcell in their youths, and later debuted in a 1987 comic book series. The characters have since been the subject of a graphic adventure video game developed by LucasArts, a television series produced for Fox in cooperation with Nelvana Limited, and a series of episodic adventure games developed by Telltale Games. In addition, a variety of machinima and a webcomic have been produced for the series.

The characters are based in a dilapidated office block in New York City. Sam is a six-foot-tall dog who wears a suit and a fedora, while Max is a short and aggressive "hyperkinetic rabbity thing". As the Freelance Police, both enjoy solving problems and cases as maniacally as possible, often with complete disregard for the law. Driving a seemingly indestructible black-and-white 1960 DeSoto Adventurer, the pair travel to many contemporary and historical locations to fight crime, including the Moon, Ancient Egypt, the White House and the Philippines, as well as several fictitious locations.

The series has been very successful despite its relatively limited amount of media, and has gathered a significant fan base. However, the franchise did not gain more widespread recognition until after the 1993 release of LucasArts' Sam & Max Hit the Road, which cultivated interest in Purcell's original comics. Sam & Max Hit the Road is regarded as an exceptional adventure game and an iconic classic of computer gaming in the 1990s. Subsequent video games and the television series have also fared well with both critics and fans; critics consider the episodic video games to be the first successful application of the episodic distribution model.

== Overview ==
=== Creation ===
The idea of Sam & Max originated with Steve Purcell's younger brother, Dave, who invented the concept of a comic about a detective team consisting of a dog and a rabbit in his youth. Dave often left the comics around the house, so Steve, in a case of sibling rivalry, often finished the incomplete stories in parodies of their original form, deliberately making the characters mix up each other's names, over-explain things, shoot at each other and mock the way in which they had been drawn, as "kind of a parody of the way a kid talks when he's writing comics". Over time, this developed from Steve merely mocking his brother's work to him creating his own full stories with the characters. Ultimately, in the late 1970s, Dave Purcell gave Steve the rights to the characters, signing them over in a contract on Steve's birthday and allowing him to develop the characters in his own way. In 1980, Purcell began to produce Sam & Max comic strips for the weekly newsletter of the California College of Arts and Crafts. While the visual appearance of the characters had not yet been fully developed, the stories were similar in style to those that followed when Purcell was offered by Fish Police author Steven Moncuse the chance to publish his work properly in 1987.

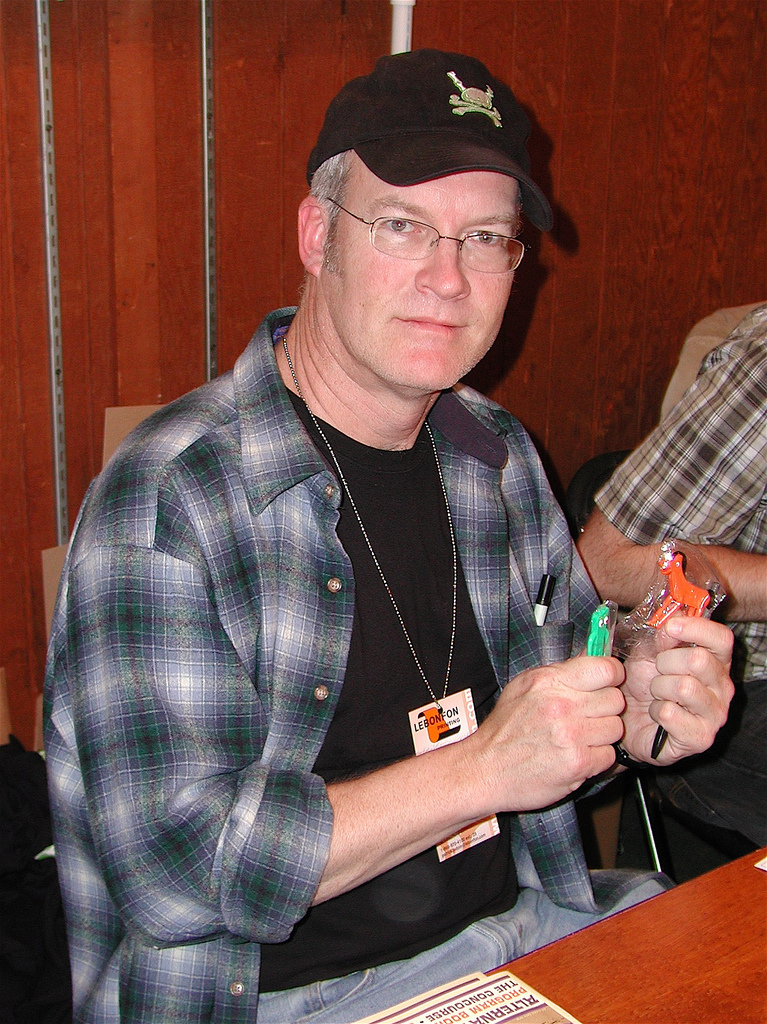
Sam & Max is owned by Steve Purcell, who took a significant role in developing the later video games.

Many aspects of the Sam & Max comics were influenced by Purcell's own experiences. Rats and cockroaches are common throughout the franchise, the former inspired by Purcell's pet rat. In another example, Sam and Max are occasionally shown playing a game called "fizzball", in which the object of the exercise is to hit a can of beer in mid-air with a solid axe handle. Purcell had previously invented the game with his friends, including fellow comic book writers Art Adams and Mike Mignola.

=== Characters ===
==== Sam ====
Sam is a laid-back but enthusiastic, brown-coated anthropomorphic Irish Wolfhound, described as a "canine shamus". He wears either a gray or blue suit with a matching fedora, to make people more cooperative when conversing with a six-foot talking dog. A warped sense of justice makes Sam the more passionate of the pair for their police work, only held back from taking his job seriously by Max. Nevertheless, he enjoys the mannerisms and dress that come with their line of work. Sam possesses near encyclopedic amounts of knowledge, particularly on obscure topics, and is prone to long-winded sentences filled with elaborate terminology. Although he is always keen to display this information—regardless of its accuracy—Sam can be capable of total ignorance towards more practical matters; for instance, despite his regard for his DeSoto Adventurer, he is severely negligent with the car's maintenance. Sam still retains various doglike qualities: he is excitable and enthusiastic, but also susceptible to emotions of embarrassment and guilt. Nevertheless, Sam is "not above sticking his head out the car window and letting his tongue flap in the breeze". Sam is very friendly and polite in spite of his over-the-top recklessness as an officer, and is shown to be quite cordial with his allies. That said, while he does deeply care about his friends, he has no problems with using manipulative tactics on them in order to further his goals when it comes to his job. He rarely loses his temper, and is able to react to panic-inducing situations with extreme calm. At the off chance he does get angry, Sam tends to react in a violent, uncharacteristically savage manner, in which case Max usually calms him down and prevents him from acting upon his anger. Sam usually is armed with an oversized .44 revolver.

Sam is voiced by Bill Farmer in Sam & Max Hit the Road, Harvey Atkin in the animated series and David Nowlin from Telltale's games onward.

==== Max ====
Max is an anthropomorphic "hyperkinetic, three-foot rabbity thing" with white fur, but prefers being called a lagomorph. Max retains few characteristics consistent with a rabbit, with permanently rigid ears set in an excited posture and a huge jaw normally stuck in a crazed grin. Unhinged, uninhibited and near psychotic, Max enjoys violence and tends to prefer the aggressive way of solving problems, seeing the world as little more than a vessel for his "pinball-like stream of consciousness". This creates a seeming disregard for self-preservation; Max will revel in dangerous situations with little impression that he understands the risks he faces. As a result, Max is usually enthusiastic to engage in any activity, including being used by Sam as a cable cutter or an impromptu bludgeon. Despite this, Max possesses a sharp mind and an observational nature, and enjoys interpreting new experiences in as unpredictable a manner as possible. However, Max has a distaste for long stories and occasionally loses focus during lengthy scenes of plot exposition; by his own admission, Max possesses a particularly short attention span. On top of this short attention span, it has been shown numerous times that Max has an extremely poor memory to go along with it. Despite his seemingly heartless personality, he does have moments where he demonstrates care and compassion for others, and he believes strongly in upholding the law in his own twisted way. He's also very protective of Sam, but Max can still act violently towards his friend, stating that when he dies, he will take Sam with him. Moreover, Max is extremely possessive of Sam and their status as partners and best friends. Max traditionally carries a Luger pistol, but as he wears no clothes, other characters often make comments as to where Max keeps it on his person. Purcell considers Max to be representative of pure id, the uncoordinated instinctual trends of the human psyche.

Max's voice is provided by Nick Jameson in Sam & Max Hit the Road and by Robert Tinkler in the animated series. Andrew Chaikin originally voiced Max in the first episode of Telltale's games before being replaced by William Kasten, while Dave Boat voices the character from Poker Night 2 onward.

== Media ==
=== Comic books ===
Sam & Max debuted in 1987, in a comic book series initially published by Fishwrap Productions.

Sam and Max debuted in the 1987 comic book series Sam & Max: Freelance Police, published by Fishwrap Productions, also the publisher of Fish Police. The first comic, "Monkeys Violating the Heavenly Temple", was Steve Purcell's first full story. The comic came about after Purcell agreed to create a full Sam & Max story for publication alongside Steve Moncuse's Fish Police series. "Monkeys Violating the Heavenly Temple" established many of the key features in the series; the main story of the comic saw the Freelance Police journey to the Philippines to stop a volcano god cult. "Night of the Gilded Heron-Shark" and "Night of the Cringing Wildebeest" accompanied the main story, focusing on a stand-off with a group of gangsters in Sam and Max's office and an investigation into a carnival refreshment booth respectively.

Over the subsequent years, several other comics were published, often by different publishers, including Comico Comics and Epic Comics. "Fair Wind to Java" was originally published in 1988 as a Munden's Bar story in the pages of First Comics' Grimjack, featuring the Freelance Police fighting pyramid-building aliens in Ancient Egypt, and was followed in 1989 by "On the Road", a three chapter story showing what Sam and Max do on vacation. In 1990, Christmas-themed story "The Damned Don't Dance" was released. 1992 saw the release of two further comics: "Bad Day On The Moon" took the Freelance Police to deal with a roach infestation bothering giant rats on the Moon, and was later adapted as a story for the animated TV series, whilst "Beast From The Cereal Aisle" focused on the duo conducting an exorcism at the local supermarket. Two more comics were produced in 1997, "The Kids Take Over" and "Belly Of The Beast". The former has Sam and Max wake up from cryogenic sleep to discover that the entire world is now ruled by children while the latter sees the Freelance Police confronting a vampire abducting children at Halloween.

Purcell joined LucasArts in 1988 as an artist and game designer, where he was approached about contributing to LucasArts' new quarterly newsletter, The Adventurer, a publication designed to inform customers about upcoming LucasArts games and company news. From its debut issue in 1990 to 1996, Purcell created twelve comic strips for the newsletter. The strips portrayed a variety of stories, from similar plots as in the comic books to parodies of LucasArts games such as Monkey Island and Full Throttle and the Lucasfilm franchises Star Wars and Indiana Jones.

In 1995, all of the comics and The Adventurer strips published to that date were released in a compilation, Sam & Max: Surfin' the Highway. Published by Marlowe & Company, the 154 page book was updated and republished in 1996. This original version of Surfin' the Highway went out of print in 1997, becoming a high-priced collector's item sold through services such as eBay. In 2007, a 197-page twenty-year anniversary edition, containing all printed comics and strips as well as a variety of other artwork, was co-designed by Steve Purcell and Jake Rodkin and published by Telltale Games. This second publication received an Eisner Award nomination for "Best Graphic Album – Reprint" in 2009.

In December 2005, Purcell started a Sam & Max webcomic, hosted on the website of Telltale Games. Entitled "The Big Sleep", the webcomic began with Sam and Max bursting out of their graves at Kilpeck Church in England, symbolizing the Freelance Police's return after nearly a decade. In the twelve page story, Max has to save Sam after earwigs start a colony in Sam's brain. The webcomic concluded in April 2007, and was later awarded the Eisner Award for "Best Digital Comic" of 2007.

=== Video games ===
Release timeline
1993	Sam & Max Hit the Road
1994–2006
2007	Sam & Max Save the World
2008	Sam & Max Beyond Time and Space
2009
2010	Sam & Max: The Devil's Playhouse
2011–2019
2020	Sam & Max Save the World Remastered
2021	Sam & Max: This Time It's Virtual! Sam & Max Beyond Time and Space Remastered
2022–2023
2024	Sam & Max: The Devil's Playhouse Remastered

Following LucasArts' employment of Purcell in 1988, the characters of Sam and Max appeared in internal testing material for new SCUMM engine programmers; Purcell created animated versions of the characters and an office backdrop for the programmers to practice on. In 1992, LucasArts offered Purcell the chance to create a video game out of the characters, out of a wish to use new characters after the success of its two other main adventure titles, Monkey Island and Maniac Mansion, and after a positive reaction from fans to the Sam & Max comic strips featured in LucasArts' The Adventurer newsletter. Consequently, development on a graphic adventure game, Sam & Max Hit the Road, began shortly after. Based on the SCUMM engine and designed by Sean Clark, Michael Stemmle, Steve Purcell and his future wife Collette Michaud, the game was partially based on the 1989 comic "On The Road", and featured the Freelance Police travelling across America in search of an escaped bigfoot. Sam was voiced in the game by comedian Bill Farmer, while actor Nick Jameson voiced Max. Sam & Max Hit the Road was originally released for MS-DOS in November 1993. Soon after Sam & Max Hit the Road, another Sam & Max game using SCUMM entered planning under Purcell and Dave Grossman, but was abandoned. In a later interview Grossman described this sequel's highlight as "a giant spaceship shaped like Max's head".

Sam and Max made their transition into 3D in 2006; Purcell wanted to ensure that Telltale's series matched the tone of the comics, both visually and in content.

In September 2001, development began on a new project, Sam & Max Plunge Through Space. The game was to be an Xbox exclusive title, developed by Infinite Machine, a small company consisting of a number of former LucasArts employees. The story of the game was developed by Purcell and fellow designer Chuck Jordan and involved the Freelance Police travelling the galaxy to find a stolen Statue of Liberty. Infinite Machine went bankrupt within a year, partially due to the failure of their first game, New Legends, and the project was abandoned.

At the 2002 Electronic Entertainment Expo convention, nearly a decade after the release of Sam & Max Hit the Road, LucasArts announced the production of a PC sequel, entitled Sam & Max: Freelance Police. Freelance Police, like Hit the Road, was to be a point-and-click graphic adventure game, using a new 3D game engine. Development of Freelance Police was led by Michael Stemmle. Steve Purcell contributed to the project by writing the story and producing concept art. Farmer and Jameson were also set to reprise their voice acting roles. In March 2004, however, quite far into the game's development, Sam & Max: Freelance Police was abruptly cancelled by LucasArts, citing "current market place realities and underlying economic considerations" in a short press release. The fan reaction to the cancellation was strong; a petition of 32,000 signatures stating the disappointment of fans was later presented to LucasArts.

After LucasArts' license with Steve Purcell expired in 2005, the Sam & Max franchise moved to Telltale Games, a company of former LucasArts employees who had worked on a number of LucasArts adventure games, including on the development of Freelance Police. Under Telltale Games, a new episodic series of Sam & Max video games was made. Like both Sam & Max Hit the Road and Freelance Police, Sam & Max Save the World was in a point-and-click graphic adventure game format. The game used a new 3D game engine, different from the one used in Freelance Police. The first season ran for six episodes, each with a self-contained storyline but with an overall story arc involving hypnotism running through the series. The first episode was released on GameTap in October 2006, with episodes following regularly until April 2007. Sam is voiced by David Nowlin, while Max is voiced by William Kasten in all episodes except the first one, where Andrew Chaikin voices the character. In addition, Telltale Games produced fifteen machinima shorts to accompany the main episodes. These shorts were released in groups of three in between the release of each episode, showing the activities of the Freelance Police in between each story.

A second season of episodic video games was developed by Telltale Games. Sam & Max Beyond Time and Space followed the same overall format as Save the World, with each episode having an overarching storyline involving time travel and laundering of the souls of the dead. As with Save the World, episodes were originally published on GameTap before being made available for general release. The season consisted of five episodes and ran from November 2007 to April 2008. Nowlin and Kasten both returned to reprise their voice roles. In addition to the main games, a twenty-minute machinima video was produced, taking the form of a Sam & Max Christmas special.

A third game entitled Sam & Max: The Devil's Playhouse was scheduled for release in 2009; the title was later pushed back to 2010, with concept art emerging after Telltale's completion of Tales of Monkey Island. The season again ran for five episodes, released monthly from April to August 2010. The Devil's Playhouse followed a structure similar to Tales of Monkey Island, with each episode forming a part of an ongoing narrative, involving psychic powers and forces that used them for world domination. A two-minute Flash cartoon also accompanied the game, dealing with the origin story of General Skun-ka'pe, one of the game's antagonists. Max also appears in Telltale's 2010 casual game Poker Night at the Inventory alongside Tycho Brahe from Penny Arcade, the Heavy from Team Fortress 2 and Strong Bad from Homestar Runner. Sam and Max (now voiced by Dave Boat) also appear in the game's sequel alongside Claptrap from Borderlands, Brock Samson from The Venture Bros., Ash Williams from Evil Dead and GLaDOS from Portal.

A Sam & Max virtual reality game, Sam & Max: This Time It's Virtual!, was developed by HappyGiant. Purcell served as a consultant for game design, Stemmle returned as designer and writer, Jared Emerson-Johnson returned as composer, and Nowlin and Boat returned to voice Sam and Max, respectively. The game was released in July 2021 for Oculus Quest, with releases for SteamVR and Viveport Infinity to follow in late 2021, and for PlayStation VR in 2022. Remasters of all three Telltale seasons were released between 2020 and 2024. The remasters were developed by Skunkape Games, a studio made up of former members of the original development team and named in reference to the General Skun-ka'pe character from The Devil's Playhouse. Skunkape later released a remaster of Poker Night at the Inventory in 2026.

=== Television series ===
Sam & Max was adapted into a cartoon series for Fox in 1997. Produced by Canadian studio Nelvana, the series ran for 24 episodes. Each episode was approximately ten minutes, and were often aired in pairs, with the exception of the first and last episodes, which were 20 minutes long. Broadcast on Fox Kids in the United States, YTV in Canada, and Channel 4 in the United Kingdom, the first episode was aired on October 4, 1997; the series concluded on April 25, 1998. As opposed to the more adult humor in the rest of the series, The Adventures of Sam & Max: Freelance Police was aimed more at children, even though some humor in it was often directed at adults. As such, the violence inherent in the franchise is toned down, including removing Sam and Max's guns, and the characters do not use the moderate profanity that they use in their other appearances. As in most Sam & Max stories, the series revolves around the Freelance Police accepting missions from their mysterious superior, the commissioner, and embarking on cases to a large variety of implausible locations. Sam is voiced by Harvey Atkin, while Max is voiced by Robert Tinkler. The series performed well and was considered a success, and in 1998 received the Gemini Award for "Best Animated Program or Series". Despite the series' success, a second season was never commissioned. In 2007, Shout! Factory acquired the rights for DVD release of the series. In October, as part of their marketing for Sam & Max Save the World, GameTap hosted the series on their website. The DVD release of the series was later published in March 2008.

=== Music ===
The Sam & Max franchise features a variety of soundtracks that accompany its video game products. This music is mostly grounded in film noir jazz, incorporating various other styles at certain points, such as Dixieland, waltz and mariachi, usually to support the cartoon nature of the series. The first Sam & Max game, Sam & Max Hit the Road, was one of the first games to feature a fully scored music soundtrack, written by LucasArts' composers Clint Bajakian, Michael Land and Peter McConnell. The music was incorporated into the game using Land and McConnell's iMUSE engine, which allowed for audio to be synchronized with the visuals. Although the full soundtrack was never released, audio renders of four of the game's MIDI tracks were included on the CD version of the game.

For Sam & Max Save the World, Beyond Time and Space, and The Devil's Playhouse, Telltale Games contracted composer Jared Emerson-Johnson, a musician whose previous work included composition and sound editing for LucasArts, to write the scores. The soundtracks for the first two games were released in two disc sets after the release of the games themselves; the Season One Soundtrack was published in July 2007, whilst the Season Two Soundtrack was released in September 2008. Emerson-Johnson's scores use live performances as opposed to synthesized music often used elsewhere in the video game industry. Critics reacted positively to Emerson-Johnson's scores, IGN described Emerson-Johnson's work as a "breath of fresh air", while 1UP.com praised his work as "top-caliber" and Music4Games stated that the "whimsical nature of [the classical jazz approach] is well suited to the Sam & Max universe, which approaches American popular culture with a level of irreverence". Purcell later commented that Emerson-Johnson had seamlessly blended a "huge palette of genres and styles", whilst in September 2008, Brendan Q. Ferguson, one of the lead designers on Save the World and Beyond Time and Space, said that he believed that it was Emerson-Johnson's scores that created the vital atmosphere in the games, noting that prior to the implementation of the soundtracks, playing the games was an "unrelenting horror". Emerson-Johnson later returned to compose music for the Remastered releases, as well as This Time It's Virtual.

== Cultural impact and reception ==
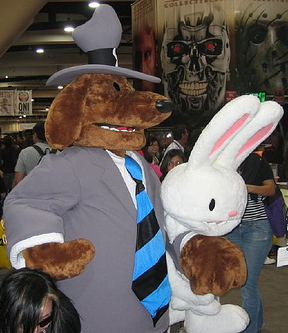
Sam and Max cosplay at San Diego Comic-Con in 2007

The Sam & Max franchise has been highly successful critically, and is considered an iconic and influential aspect of the video game industry in the 1990s and the adventure game genre. In 2007, Steve Purcell wrote that he was somewhat surprised at the success of his creation, noting that the series had gained a large fan gathering despite the small size of the franchise. As the series contains only a small number of comics, video games and a short TV series, Purcell commented that there was "certainly not enough material to build that relentless traction of an endlessly renewed sitcom or a syndicated comic that has existed since the Korean Conflict". The comics were well received by critics, many praising the humor and style of the stories and characters. However, later commentators have noted that the comic book series did not gain much popularity or recognition until after the release of Sam & Max Hit the Road in 1993; the later episodic video games are seen to have revived interest in the comics again, resulting in the creation of the webcomic "The Big Sleep" and publication of an anniversary edition of Surfin' The Highway.

Upon its release in 1993, Sam & Max Hit the Road was met with near universal acclaim. Critics praised the title for its humor, voice acting, graphics, music and gameplay. It has since come to be regarded as a classic graphic adventure game, one of the most critically successful projects by LucasArts to date. Sam & Max Hit the Road is regularly featured in lists of top games, and was nominated for the 1994 Annie Award for "Best Animated CD-ROM", although the award instead went to LucasArts' Star Wars: Rebel Assault. The abrupt cancellation of the sequel to Sam & Max Hit the Road in 2004 garnered substantial criticism of LucasArts. In addition to a petition of 32,000 signatures objecting to the termination of development on Sam & Max: Freelance Police, both Steve Purcell and the media were critical of LucasArts' decision. Purcell stated that he failed to understand quite why the game was cancelled, as he believed the development of the game was proceeding without hindrance, while the media put forward the view that LucasArts was moving to consolidate its position with low business risk Star Wars video games instead of pursuing the adventure games that had brought them success in earlier years. The cancellation of Freelance Police is often cited as the culmination in a perceived decline in the overall adventure game genre, and LucasArts later dismissed many of the designers involved with developing their adventure games, effectively ending their adventure game era.

Although Sam & Max Save the World did not receive the critical acclaim that Sam & Max Hit the Road acquired, it still received a favorable response from critics across its release in 2006 and 2007. Critics praised the game's humor, graphics and gameplay, although concerns were voiced over the low difficulty of the puzzles and the effectiveness of the story. Save the World is considered by journalists in the video game industry to be the first successful application of episodic gaming, as Telltale Games had managed to release a steady stream content with only small time gaps. Previous attempts by Valve with the Half-Life series, Ritual Entertainment with Sin Episodes: Emergence and Telltale Games themselves with Bone were for a variety of reasons not considered successful implementations of the distribution model. Beyond Time and Space was considered similar to Save the World and reviewers equally praised and faulted the game on this, although overall Beyond Time and Space received a good reception from critics.

The success of the franchise has spawned a selection of merchandise, including posters and prints, items of clothing and sketchbooks of Purcell's work during various stages of the series' development. Collectable statues of the characters have also been created. However, perhaps due to references in Purcell's sketchbooks and demand from both fans and journalists alike, a plush toy of Max has been created and sold, albeit limited edition, as a collaboration between internet shop Hashtag Collectibles and Steve Purcell. A limited edition plush toy of Sam has also been created and sold in late 2023 on Uncute's website, and Max being brought back along with him for a limited time once again, alongside Max themed slippers in 2024. Boss Fight Studios produced a new line of action figures based on the Freelance Police for 2019, and the prototypes were first revealed at New York Toy Fair.
