= Brendan Q. Ferguson =

American computer game designer, writer, programmer

- Occupation(s): Game designer, writer, programmer

Brendan Q. Ferguson is an American computer game designer, writer, programmer, and voice actor. He was the co-designer and co-writer of Sam & Max Save the World and Sam & Max Beyond Time and Space. He was also the co-designer of Strong Bad's Cool Game for Attractive People.

== Career ==
Brendan Q. Ferguson began his career as a programmer at LucasArts in 2003 on Star Wars: Obi-Wan. He was a co-writer and co-designer of the cancelled Sam & Max Freelance Police. He left LucasArts with much of the Freelance Police team in 2004 to join Telltale Games. He maintained their blog in their early years and was as a co-designer of their first game, Telltale Texas Hold'em. He was also the voice of Theodore Dudebrough in that game. Between 2006 and 2007, he co-designed and co-wrote Sam & Max Save the World. In 2007 and 2008, he also the co-designed and co-wrote the sequel, Sam & Max Beyond Time and Space. He reprised his role as voice actor in those games, voicing the bug. His final project at Telltale Games was writing the episode "The Tomb of Sammun-Mak" for Sam & Max: The Devil's Playhouse, before leaving Telltale Games in 2010.

== Recognition ==
Sam & Max Beyond Time & Space, which was co-designed and co-written by Ferguson, received awards in the 2008 Adventure Gamers Aggie Awards in the categories of "Best Writing", "Best Gameplay", "Best Third-Person PC Adventure", and "Best Adventure of 2008".

Tales of Monkey Island, for which Brendan Q. Furguson co-developed episodes 1–4, was nominated for "best artistic design" and won for the award for "biggest surprise" at IGN's Best of E3 2009 Awards. After release, it won the PC Gamer 2009 adventure game of the year, was nominated for the IGN best adventure game of the year for PC and Wii, won the Adventure Gamers Best Adventure of 2009, and was named the "Best Series Revival" by OC Weekly.

== Credited works ==
=== Video games ===
Year	Title	Role	Developer
2001	Star Wars: Obi-Wan	Programmer	LucasArts
2003	Gladius	Programmer	LucasArts
2005	Telltale Texas Hold'em	Co-designer, voice actor of Theodore Dudebrough	Telltale Games
2007	Sam & Max Save the World	Co-designer, co-writer, voice actor of the bug	Telltale Games
2008	Sam & Max Beyond Time and Space	Co-designer, co-writer, voice actor of the bug	Telltale Games
2008	Strong Bad's Cool Game for Attractive People	Co-designer	Telltale Games
2009	Tales of Monkey Island	Co-designer (episodes 1–4)	Telltale Games
2010	Sam & Max: The Devil's Playhouse	Writer of "The Tomb of Sammun-Mak"	Telltale Games
