= Simon Jeffery =

American businessman

Simon Jeffery is the chief publishing officer of ngmoco's Plus+ Publishing group.

Similar to EA Publishing Partners group, Plus+ Publishing is a combined technology, App Store publishing and custom support play for iPhone and iPod touch developers. It will launch its first products with the rollout of the 3.0 operating system for those devices. Prior to this, Jeffery was the president of Sega of America from 2004 to 2009. He was president of LucasArts between 2000 and 2003, and a director at the company for three years beforehand. Prior to joining LucasArts, Jeffery worked in a number of marketing, business and development roles for Virgin Interactive and Electronic Arts.

At Sega, Jeffery plans to recruit Western development houses to work with Japanese Sega IP and strengthening Sega's game production in the West in general. At E3 2008 Jeffery told Sega fans there is not going to be a new console from Sega, and no current plans to develop a Shenmue 3. This kills off hope of a Dreamcast 2 and downheartens many Sega fans who still believed it would happen.

Jeffery's main accomplishment during his tenure at LucasArts was forging new relations with external developers to fully develop the Star Wars gaming IP, such as Pandemic Studios, Planet Moon Studios, The Collective, Raven Software and BioWare. Several of LucasArts' most revered and successful Star Wars games were launched during this period, including Rogue Squadron, Jedi Knight II, Star Wars: Battlefront, and Knights of the Old Republic.

However, his goal of turning around a creative original IP slump at the company was never fully realized. According to Jeffery, LucasArts had too heavily relied on its Star Wars license, but successful new IP failed to materialize. Games such as Gladius and RTX Red Rock did not achieve critical acclaim or great sales; follow-ups to classic LucasArts adventure games, Full Throttle: Hell on Wheels and Sam & Max: Freelance Police were cancelled, to much dismay of the fans. (An online petition to save Freelance Police got over 31000 signatures.)

Simon Jeffery later became the subject of several fan animations in the LucasArts fan community, often depicted as a Jesus-like figure. Jeffery is a big Star Wars fan and once claimed to have seen A New Hope 93 times.
