= Stemmle =

Stemmle is a surname. Notable people with the surname include:

- Brian Stemmle (born 1966), Canadian skier
- Karen Stemmle (born 1964), Canadian skier
- Michael Stemmle (born 1967), American computer game writer, designer, and director
- Robert A. Stemmle (1903–1974), German screenwriter and film director
