= Sam & Max Beyond Time and Space =

2007-2008 episodic video game

- Developer: Telltale Games (Note: Remastered version developed by Skunkape Games.)
- Publishers: Telltale Games (Note: Windows and Wii physical versions published by Atari. Remastered version published by Skunkape Games.); Microsoft Game Studios (X360)
- Designer: Dave Grossman
- Programmer: Randy Tudor
- Artist: David Bogan
- Writers: Brendan Q. Ferguson; Dave Grossman; Heather Logas; Chuck Jordan; Ian Dallas; Jeff Lester; Steve Purcell
- Composer: Jared Emerson-Johnson
- Series: Sam & Max
- Engine: Telltale Tool
- Platforms: Microsoft Windows; Xbox 360; Wii; OS X; PlayStation 3; iOS; Nintendo Switch; Xbox One; PlayStation 4
- Release: Microsoft Windows 2007 – 2008: Episodes; November 8, 2007 – April 10, 2008; Season Two; May 16, 2008; Remastered; December 8, 2021; Xbox 360; October 14, 2009; Wii; NA: March 16, 2010; EU: April 30, 2010; AU: December 1, 2010 OS X; May 18, 2010; PlayStation 3; October 18, 2011; iOS; January 26, 2012 – April 19, 2012; Switch, Xbox One; December 8, 2021; PlayStation 4; September 29, 2022
- Genre: Graphic adventure
- Mode: Single-player

Sam & Max Beyond Time and Space is an episodic graphic adventure video game developed and published by Telltale Games. It is the second Sam & Max episodic video game developed by Telltale, serving as the sequel to Sam & Max Save the World, and the third overall game based on the comic book series created by Steve Purcell. (Note: Not including the cancelled releases of Sam & Max: Freelance Police and Sam & Max Plunge Through Space) The game continues the investigations of Sam and Max, an anthropomorphic dog and rabbity-thing, working as private detectives, as they solve cases across the world, in space and at Hell, between the past, present, and future.

Like Save the World, the game was released through separate episodes, each having a contained story. Five episodes were released between November 2007 and April 2008 for Microsoft Windows, originally titled as Sam & Max: Season Two, before being ported to the Wii, Xbox 360, and iOS in later years. A remaster of the game by Skunkape Games was released in December 2021 for Windows, Nintendo Switch and Xbox One, and in September 2022 for PlayStation 4. The game received positive reception from critics, who praised the humor, writing and setting but criticized some of the newly-introduced characters, episode length and puzzles. A sequel, Sam & Max: The Devil's Playhouse was released in 2010.

== Gameplay ==
Sam & Max Beyond Time and Space is a 3D graphic adventure game with largely the same gameplay elements as Sam & Max Save the World; the player controls and directs Sam via a point-and-click interface through a variety of different environments to solve puzzles. The player can interact with a number of different items and non-player characters through a dialogue tree, which may be required to complete certain puzzles.

The game now implements an adjustable hints system, support for widescreen monitors, more realistic animations, and additional mini-games within each episode. Beyond Time and Space features a calibration assistant when first run, which allows the player to set their graphics and difficulty settings before playing. During each episode, the player can unlock decals after playing mini-games using Sam and Max's 1960 DeSoto Adventurer. The iOS port of the episodes received online leaderboards for Whack da Ratz, a Whac-A-Mole-style minigame, which was modified to continue indefinitely, and a soundboard. There is also a tutorial on the first puzzle seen on Save the World's first episode, "Culture Shock", highlighting the basics of puzzle solving and game interface.

== Synopsis ==
=== Setting and characters ===
Like Sam & Max Hit the Road and Save the World, Beyond Time and Space continues the investigations of the titular duo Sam and Max, together known as the Freelance Police. Sam (voiced by David Nowlin) is a six-foot tall Irish Wolfhound who wears a gray suit and fedora and is generally very friendly and inquisitive, though he isn't above solving cases using force. Max (voiced by William Kasten) is described as a "hyperkinetic rabbity-thing" and is the more sociopathic and trigger-happy member with a complete lack of conscience and enjoys solving cases in the most chaotic way possible. He became President of the United States during the previous season.

Some characters from the previous season return in Season Two including a convenience store owner and consipracy theorist Roscoe Bosco; Sybil, a local business owner; US Secret Service agent Superball; Abe Lincoln, the head of the Lincoln statue from the Lincoln Memorial, the Computer Obsolescence Prevention Society (COPS), a group of old computers, one of whom is revealed to be built by Sam; Jimmy Two-Teeth, a rat who lives inside the duo's office; and the Soda Poppers, a group of former child actors, later revealed to be the masterminds behind the evil plots at Hell during the final episode.

New characters were also introduced in this season, including Flint Paper, a hardboiled detective and Sam and Max's next door neighbor (though he appeared in previous Sam & Max comics); Girl Stinky and Grandpa Stinky, vitriolic co-owners of Stinky's Diner; Santa Claus and his elves; the Moai heads of Easter Island; Jürgen, a vampire living in Stuttgart whose lair has Frankenstein's monster; Ms. Bosco, Bosco's deceased mother living as a ghost in the present; "THEM", three time-traveling clones of a mariachi named Pedro who travel through time to celebrate someone's birthday; and the Devil. Sam and Max also revisit their past and future selves during "Chariots of the Dogs" as well as briefly transforming into their younger selves in "Moai Better Blues".

=== Plot ===
The season takes place in a variety of different settings, including (clockwise from top left) the North Pole, Hell (depicted as an office), Jurgen's Lair in Stuttgart and Easter Island.

A year after the events of Save the World, Sam and Max are disturbed by a giant robot that kills their pet goldfish Mr. Spatula, discovered to have originated from the North Pole after taking it down. The two head to the North Pole and find Santa firing upon the elves and a demon possessing an elf. The demon is reduced to a plate of Jell-O after the duo travels from their past, present and future, which Santa inadvertently eats and becomes possessed. Sam and Max knock Santa out, learning the demon was intended for Satan. They send Santa to Hell and deliver all the Christmas presents in his place.

A month later, Sybil and Abe get sucked into a portal to Easter Island. After entering the portal, Sam and Max discover an island with missing people turned to babies by the Fountain of Youth, and discover through the Moai that a prophecy states that a volcano will erupt and destroy them. In a nearby cave, they discover a group of aquatic Ocean Chimps who worship the Moai's giant stone feet, and the ghost of Mr. Spatula has established himself as their High Priest, planning to use a machine to trigger an eruption. Sam convinces the Ocean Chimps that Max is the true High Priest, but Mr. Spatula sets off the eruption which Sam and Max prevents by diverting lava flow through a portal. The two swim back to shore with Abe while the Moai are suddenly abducted.

Sometime later, the city is attacked by zombies from the Zombie Factory, a nightclub in Stuttgart run by the vampire Jürgen. Using traditional vampire weaknesses to lower Jürgen's popularity and make him vulnerable, Sam and Max pursue Jürgen but get caught in a death-trap and killed. The two reawaken as zombies and find Jürgen sleeping in his coffin and their souls trapped waiting to be shipped off to Hell. They retrieve a Soul Mater device from Sybil, inadvertently convincing her to get back together with Abe, but accidentally end up in each other's bodies. The two force Jürgen into his own deathtrap, and his soul is abducted. As Sam and Max return to their bodies, their neighbor Flint Paper arrives to announce Bosco has gone missing.

The three break into Bosco's store to look for clues, but Sam and Max inadvertently signal a UFO, which abducts them. They find Bosco, who has turned into a cow after stumbling into a time-traveling elevator and inadvertently altering the events of his birth. Sam and Max use the elevator to travel through time and restore Bosco, and confront a mariachi with past, present and future versions of Pedro who celebrate birthdays through different time periods and collect souls for Hell to pay for their spaceship. (Note: The appearance of the mariachi band was seen in prior episodes) Bosco is overwhelmed and dies of a heart attack, and the mariachis use his soul to fill their quota. Sam and Max trick the mariachis into leaving so they can rescue Bosco's soul, but they accidentally send it to Hell and trigger the ship's self-destruct sequence. The two follow Bosco's soul through the portal, while the spaceship explodes just as it reaches the beginning of time, causing the Big Bang.

Sam and Max travel to Hell through a subway below their street, where they discover the place to be an office environment ran by Satan employing their past deceased enemies and containing their friends trapped in their personal hells. Sam successfully frees their friends but gets tricked into being sent to his own personal hell. Max frees Sam, only to discover the Soda Poppers taking Satan's place who fire Satan and initiate a series of new evil plots, but Sam and Max thwart each of these and convince Satan to join them in retaking Hell. The Soda Poppers assume demonic forms and attempt to kill Sam and Max, but are tricked into using their own banishing ritual against themselves, trapping them in a fiery pit and allowing Satan to take back control. Everyone then leaves to attend Abe and Sybil's wedding. In a post-credits scene, the Soda Poppers swear revenge, only to be killed by the diverted lava flow from Easter Island.

== Episodes ==
Episode	Release date	
Episode	GameTap release	General release
"Ice Station Santa"	November 8, 2007	November 9, 2007
An ancient and bloated pagan god sends a bloodthirsty war robot to destroy Sam & Max.
"Moai Better Blues"	January 10, 2008	January 11, 2008
Sam & Max travel to the tropics where they try to stop a volcanic eruption.
"Night of the Raving Dead"	February 12, 2008	February 13, 2008
Sam & Max crash an emo European vampire's nightclub to stop a zombie apocalypse.
"Chariots of the Dogs"	March 13, 2008	March 14, 2008
Sam & Max team up with Flint Paper to discover what happened to a missing Bosco.
"What's New, Beelzebub?"	April 10, 2008	April 11, 2008
Sam & Max travel to hell to confront Satan and retrieve Bosco's lost soul.

== Development ==
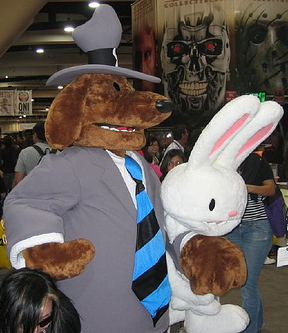
Sam and Max cosplay at the 2007 San Diego Comic-Con as part of Season Two's promotion

Sam & Max Beyond Time and Space, originally known as Sam & Max: Season Two, was developed by Telltale Games. The development studio was founded by former LucasArts following the cancellation of Sam & Max: Freelance Police, and developed Sam & Max: Season One, considered one of the first successful applications of the episodic video game model, with vice president and creative director of GameTap Ricardo Sanchez being pleased with the season's success in an international stage. During an interview with Chris Remo of Shacknews shortly after the release of the Season One episode "Abe Lincoln Must Die!", the development of Season Two was confirmed by Telltale CEO Dan Connors, who also mentioned the development team made sure to not miss out on an opportunity to create a second season. Steve Purcell, creator of the Sam & Max franchise, was involved in the writing and designing of the episodes. Dave Grossman, design director at Telltale, was also involved in the season's production, with him noting that the structure and gameplay of the season would match what was seen in Season One but with more ambitious stories after receiving fan feedback from message boards.

Season Two's development began in July 2007 and was announced on the 25th of that month, with episodes released first on GameTap, though the game's development would still be self-funded by Telltale. The studio's partnership with GameTap from the previous season was praised by Dan Connors, as it helped the development team's financial and commercial success. A render of Stinky's, a new location present in Season One as a closed-off diner, was also released by Telltale around the same period. A day later, the new season was revealed at the 2007 San Diego Comic-Con by Telltale. Telltale Games were invited to the PAX 07 event on August 25, where they hosted an improvisational comedy routine performed by audience members acting as Sam and Max, revealed a trailer and an animated blooper reel.

=== Music ===
Jared Emerson-Johnson, a composer from Bay Area Sound, returned from Season One to work on the game's score. Emerson-Johnson opted to compose music from a wider range of styles from Season One; while the musical score didn't stray too far away from its jazz roots heard in Season One, he deviated with tracks that used genres such as hair metal, Hungarian folk music, surf rock and techno. Emerson-Johnson cited other composers, including Gyorgy Ligeti, composer of 2001: A Space Odyssey, Astor Piazzolla and Isaac Hayes, as sources of inspiration. One track, heard in the boxing mini-game in "Ice Station Santa", was a homage to the NES game Punch-Out!!, the track being the earliest deviation from the series' jazz roots. Emerson-Johnson was recommended by Brendan Q. Ferguson to attempt something different for this piece. Emerson-Johnson was against reusing music assets between episodes. The season's soundtrack was released on January 2009.

== Release ==
Release dates and schedule for the season were announced in September 2007 with early access given to select press websites. Unlike Season One, where GameTap users were able to access each episode two weeks before it was available through Telltale's website, Season Two reduced this period down to one day. The studio announced a reduction of five episodes from six; Telltale's senior management mentioned that six episodes would be too much, and a change to five would allow for development to focus on each individual episodes more. The first episode, "Ice Station Santa", was released on November 8 on GameTap, followed by a worldwide release on November 9. The second episode was delayed until January 11, 2008. New episodes were thereafter released on the second Thursday and Friday of each month. A playable demo of Episode 1: Ice Station Santa was released on the DVD home release of The Adventures of Sam & Max: Freelance Police in March 2008.

As with Save the World in 2007, Beyond Time and Space was released on Steam on May 16, 2008.

Atari published the physical versions of Sam & Max Beyond Time and Space worldwide for both Microsoft Windows (in 2009) and Wii (in 2010). The game also received fully localized releases in French and German, as well as Italian and Spanish subtitles for the foreign language versions of Beyond Time and Space.

Sam & Max Season One and Two were released for Xbox Live Arcade in February 2009. Telltale also officially named Season Two Beyond Time and Space.

=== Remastered ===
A remaster by Skunkape Games was released in December 2021 for Windows, Nintendo Switch, and Xbox One, and in September 2022 for PlayStation 4. Like the Save the World remaster, it features new cinematics and music, improved character models and lighting, and some re-recorded dialogue.

== Reception ==
Aggregate review scores
Game	GameRankings	Metacritic
Episode 1: Ice Station Santa	82%	82
Episode 2: Moai Better Blues	81%	80
Episode 3: Night of the Raving Dead	80%	79
Episode 4: Chariots of the Dogs	85%	85
Episode 5: What's New, Beelzebub?	85%	85
Beyond Time and Space	―	(X360) 75 (Wii) 64
Beyond Time and Space Remastered	―	(PC) 84 (NS) 80 (XONE) 82 (PS4) 75

Sam & Max Beyond Time and Space received generally positive critic reaction from reviewers, both as a whole and for each of the season's episodes. The season's humor was praised by journalists. D.F. Smith from G4 commented on the consistently funny characters and dialogue, though he noted that the season frequent use of one-liners varied in quality, with some gags not landing well. The humor in "Moai Better Blues" was widely praised. IGN and GamesRadar commented on the frequent use of throwaway gags in "Moai Better Blues", with the latter website naming it the funniest episode up to that point, though TouchArcade stated that the episode "skates by on its pedigree and the humor and charm of Purcell's vision. Critics were divided on how well the humor in "Chariots of the Dogs" was executed: some publications named this episode as the funniest in the series, though GameSpy noted the lack of any satirical elements compared to other episodes was a detriment to the episode's humor. Steven A. Kenny from Music4Games praised the soundtrack from Beyond Time and Space: he noted that the soundtrack score pays homage to 1960s jazz styles well, in addition to its unique diversity of genres.

The first episode, "Ice Station Santa", received generally positive reviews, receiving an aggregated score of 82% on GameRankings and 82/100 on Metacritic. (Note: Both scores are based on 32 reviews.) Reviewers noted that the game's first episode was slightly longer and more challenging, though not too difficult, than seen in the previous season. IGN stated that, while some puzzles were basic, a lot of puzzles are more involved and have multi-part solutions. Adventure Gamers noted that the puzzles seen in the episode had more depth than in the previous season and lacked any unfair dialogue or design elements, though it noted that it lacked a memorable puzzle as seen in Save the World. TouchArcade noted that players would find more success with some puzzles by interacting with character dialogue trees, praising the episode for being "efficiently designed". However, reviewers criticized the inclusion of some new and reappearing characters to be obnoxious and unnecessary. IGN noted that the Soda Poppers "outlasted their comedic value" and "[brought] absolutely nothing to the plot", while Adventure Gamers did not find supporting character Stinky to be amusing, though they were hopeful she would be improved in later episodes.

"Moai Better Blues" fared similar reception, with a score of 80/100 on Metacritic and 81% on GameRankings. (Note: Metacritic's score was based on 30 reviews, while GameRankings' score was based on 32 reviews.) Reviewers also praised the puzzle solutions, specifically the portal mechanic and the Fountain of Youth puzzle to be clever. However, reviewers criticized the episode length being too short. TouchArcade criticized the final puzzle as "particularly boring" and "awkwardly executed". Critics generally saw the episode as an improvement to the previous one, though TouchArcade noted it to be weaker than "Ice Station Santa".

"Night of the Raving Dead" received aggregate scores of 79/100 on Metacritic and 80% on GameRankings. (Note: Metacritic's score was based on 28 reviews while GameRankings' score was based on 26 reviews.) Critics lauded the introduction of Jurgen as an entertaining antagonist to the episode and as a parody of the emo subculture; TouchArcade noted that Jurgen's early establishment as the villain of the episode allows the writers to display more nuance to the story. Reviewers also praised the episode's cultural references to other media, including Grim Fandango and the Resident Evil franchise. Joseph Leray of TouchArcade noted that the episode attempted to re-imagine the social commentary of the episode's name sake of Night of the Living Dead. Steve Butts of IGN applauded the use of Sam recalling the first half of the story rather than using a traditional narrative as an effective way to build up tension. Reviewers also praised the DeSoto mini-game, a homage to Paperboy, to be much easier and entertaining than in previous episodes, though IGN, while implying that the mini-game provided more variety, criticized it for being too easy. Nonetheless, criticism was still shown by reviewers for the episode's predictable and obtuse puzzles.

"Chariots of the Dogs" was much more positively received than the last episode and considered by critics as one of the best episodes of the season. Critics praised the time traveling storyline: Dan Whitehead of Eurogamer noted that a time travel story opens up possibilities for many gags, as well as a way to alleviate the repetition for visiting the same locations frequently. The same reviewer also praised the episode for its references to other time travel media such as Doctor Who and Bill & Ted. Steve Butts of IGN lauded Sam and Max's interactions with their past and future selves, especially to future Sam, as inventive. Reviewers also praised the spaceship setting and reveal of T.H.E.M. as the group behind the abductions: Allen Rausch of GameSpy said that T.H.E.M.'s spaceship to be the best part of the episode, mentioning that the control deck was the "best-looking new set" in the series. IGN, while also praising the introduction of T.H.E.M., was more critical of the accompanying musical number, noting that the execution and the lyrics was a weak point. The episode received aggregated scores of 85/100 on Metacritic and 85% on GameRankings. (Note: Metacritic's score was based on based on 23 reviews while GameRankings' score was based on 27 reviews.)

The season finale, "What's New, Beelzebub?", received positive acclaim with publications noting the episode as a satisfying and great conclusion to the game. Reviewers praised the episode's satirical depiction of Hell as a dull corporate office, and Satan as an unsatisfied executive, Allen Rausch of GameSpy praising the satirical humor that was lacking in the previous episode. Reviewers also praised the puzzles as having complex but accessible and clever solutions, however, other reviewers were more critical of them: Steve Butts of IGN mentioned that the puzzles weren't as challenging or rewarding as "Chariots of the Dogs", and Joseph Leray of TouchArcade noted that the puzzles "lacked punch". Dan Whitehead of Eurogamer criticized the puzzles entirely as "rudimentary inventory games" and "fetch quests" with a lack of items to collect. IGN also criticized the return of unnecessary traveling between locaitons via the soul subway. Anise Hollingshead of GameZone and Rausch of GameSpy noted this episode to be the best and funniest in the series. "What's New, Beelzebub?" received an aggregated score of 85% on GameRankings and 85/100 on Metacritic. (Note: Metacritic's score was based on 20 reviews while GameRankings' score was based on 20 reviews.)

The iOS port of the episodes were well-received by critics, noting it to be an improvement performance wise over Telltale's previous iOS release, Jurassic Park: The Game, while also maintaining the high graphical quality seen in the PC releases. Byron Paul of AppGamer.net praised the game's new control scheme, noting that the game gave more freedom of movement in a 3D environment than a traditional point-and-click game on the platform. The remastered versions were praised for improving on the original games very well, though Annette Magaña of PushSquare assessed the jokes as outdated.
