= Sam & Max Hit the Road =

1993 video game

- Cover artwork by Steve Purcell
- Developer: LucasArts
- Publishers: LucasArts (original); Disney Interactive (re-releases)
- Directors: Sean Clark; Mike Stemmle
- Producers: Sean Clark; Mike Stemmle
- Designers: Sean Clark; Collette Michaud; Steve Purcell; Michael Stemmle
- Programmers: Sean Clark; Michael Stemmle; Livia Macklin; Jonathan Ackley
- Composers: Clint Bajakian; Peter McConnell; Michael Z. Land
- Series: Sam & Max
- Engine: SCUMM (visual) iMUSE (audio)
- Platforms: MS-DOS; Mac OS; Windows
- Release: MS-DOS; November 1993; Mac OS; 1995; Windows; 2002
- Genre: Graphic adventure
- Mode: Single-player

Sam & Max Hit the Road is a 1993 graphic adventure video game released by LucasArts during the company's adventure games era. The game was originally released for MS-DOS in 1993 and for Mac OS in 1995. A 2002 re-release included compatibility with Windows. The game is based on the comic characters of Sam and Max, the "Freelance Police", an anthropomorphic dog and "hyperkinetic rabbity thing". The characters, created by Steve Purcell, originally debuted in a 1987 comic book series. Based on the 1989 Sam & Max comic On the Road, the duo take the case of a missing bigfoot from a nearby carnival, traveling to many American culture tourist sites to solve the mystery.

LucasArts began development of the game in 1992 with the intention to use new settings and characters after the success of the past Maniac Mansion and Monkey Island adventure titles. Series creator Steve Purcell, then a LucasArts employee, was one of the lead designers on the project. Sam & Max Hit the Road is the ninth game to use the SCUMM adventure game engine, and also integrated the iMUSE audio system developed by Michael Land and Peter McConnell. The game was one of the first to incorporate full voice talent; the two title characters were voiced by professional voice actors Bill Farmer and Nick Jameson while additional voices were provided by Irwin Keyes, Marsha Clark, Denny Delk, Tony Pope and Beth Wernick.

The game received critical acclaim on release, and was praised for its humor, voice acting, graphics, music and gameplay. It is now regarded as a classic point-and-click adventure game and is often considered one of the greatest video games of all time. Several attempts to produce sequels were cancelled, ultimately resulting in the franchise moving from LucasArts to Telltale Games. Since October 2014, after the acquisition of LucasArts by Disney, the game is being sold by GOG.com. The game was re-released on Steam by Disney Interactive in November 2018.

== Gameplay ==
Sam & Max Hit the Road is a 2D adventure game where the player controls the actions of Sam from a third-person perspective. The player uses Sam to explore the cartoon environments of the game and solve a series of puzzles using a simple point-and-click interface. The game's puzzles have logical solutions, although a number of them have far-fetched solutions due to the game's cartoon setting. Players can set the game's cursor in a particular mode to designate how Sam interacts with the environment: Sam can walk around an area, talk to other characters, look at objects, pick them up or otherwise try to use them. The cursor's graphic changes when it is hovered over an in-game entity that Sam can interact with. When talking to another character, the player is given a choice of subject areas to discuss, depicted in a conversation tree as icons at the base of the screen. In addition to specific topics involving the game's plot, Sam can inject unconnected exclamations, questions and non sequiturs into a conversation.

The game incorporates an inventory system for items that Sam picks up during the course of the game. Items can be used on other entities in the game world, or can often be combined with other inventory items to provide a new object necessary for solving a puzzle. Although Max's character will walk around the game's areas by his own will, Sam can also use Max at various points by using an inventory icon of Max's head on game objects—usually on characters where the solution to a problem involves violence. Sam and Max travel to different locations in the game using their black and white 1960 DeSoto Adventurer, which when clicked on in-game will present a map of the United States with all the available locations the pair can travel to shown. As the game progresses, the number of locations on the map increases.

In addition to the main game, Sam & Max Hit the Road includes several minigames. Some of these, such as a carnival game based on Whac-A-Mole but involving live rats, must be completed in order to receive new items and further the game's plot, while others, such as a car-themed version of Battleship, are entirely optional as to whether the player uses them. As with the majority of LucasArts adventure games, Sam & Max Hit the Road is designed so that the player characters cannot die or reach a complete dead-end.

== Plot ==
Sam and Max, the Freelance Police, are two comic book characters created by Steve Purcell, who act as private detectives and vigilantes. Sam & Max Hit the Road follows the pair on a case that takes them from their office in New York City across the United States. The game starts in a similar way to many of the comic stories, with Sam and Max receiving a telephone call from an unseen and unheard Commissioner, who tells them to go to a nearby carnival. At the carnival, they are told by the owners that their star attraction, a frozen bigfoot called Bruno, has been set free, and fled, taking their second attraction, Trixie the Giraffe-Necked Girl. Sam and Max set off to find Bruno and Trixie and bring them back. As the duo investigate the carnival, they learn that Bruno and Trixie are in love and that Trixie freed Bruno. The Freelance Police leave the carnival to pursue leads at various tourist traps throughout the country, such as The World's Largest Ball of Twine, a vortex controlled by giant subterranean magnets, and bungee jumping facilities at Mount Rushmore.

Sam and Max outside a "Snuckey's"; Americana sites and parodies like this are a core part of the game's setting.

The pair learn that two other bigfoots used as tourist attractions in other parts of the country have been freed by Bruno, and that Bruno has been captured by Liverpudlian country western singer Conroy Bumpus, a cruel animal abuser who wishes to use Bruno in his performances. Sam and Max travel to Bumpus' home and rescue Bruno and Trixie, but Bruno then departs with Trixie to join a bigfoot gathering at an inn in Nevada. Following them, Sam and Max disguise themselves as a bigfoot to enter the party. Eventually the party is gatecrashed by Conroy Bumpus and his henchman Lee Harvey, who hope to capture the bigfoots. However, Sam manages to fool Bumpus and Harvey into donning their bigfoot disguise, and Max locks them in the inn's kitchen freezer.

Chief Vanuatu, leader of the bigfoots, in recognition of the pair's actions, makes the Freelance Police members of the bigfoot tribe and tells them of a spell that will make the world safe for bigfoots again, preventing their capture by humans. However, the chief requires help deciphering the spell's four ingredients, and asks for Sam and Max's help. Eventually, they discover that the ingredients are a vegetable resembling John Muir, hair restoration tonic, the tooth of a dinosaur (or one from a mechanical one as is used), and a vortex contained within a snow globe. Combined with a live bigfoot sacrifice—which Max substitutes for frozen bigfoot-clad Bumpus and Harvey—the ingredients cause large trees to spring into existence, destroying towns and cities and covering the bulk of the west United States in forest. Content that their work is done, Sam and Max take the frozen ice block containing Bumpus and Harvey to the carnival. Believing that Bruno has been returned to them, the owners give a large reward of skee ball tickets to the Freelance Police, who then spend the end credits shooting targets at a carnival stall with real firearms.

== Development ==
Sam & Max Hit the Road was developed by a small team at LucasArts with prior experience on their adventure games, including Sean Clark, Michael Stemmle, and Sam & Max creator Steve Purcell and his future wife Collette Michaud. Prior to being employed at LucasArts, Steve Purcell had developed the Sam & Max characters and started publishing stories about them around 1987. These had caught attention of some of the LucasArts developers; through a suggestion that LucasArts artist Ken Macklin, Purcell was brought into the team by art director Gary Winnick. Purcell helped to draw the cover art for Zak McKracken and the Alien Mindbenders, then helped with the character animations in Indiana Jones and the Last Crusade. Sam and Max first appeared as video game characters as internal testing material for SCUMM engine programmers recently employed by LucasArts; Steve Purcell created animated versions of the characters and an office backdrop for the programmers to practice on. Soon after, Sam & Max comic strips by Steve Purcell were published in LucasArts' quarterly newsletter. After a positive reaction from fans to the strips and out of a wish to use new characters and settings after the success of the Monkey Island and Maniac Mansion franchises, LucasArts offered in 1992 to create a video game out of the characters.

You try to be aware of the amount of time you have players sitting and watching as opposed to interacting. Fortunately a lot of the humor came out of the way that the characters would respond to the player's actions. Even observing something in the room could produce a funny response in which case the interactivity is doing the work of the story.

— Steve Purcell on finding balance between story and puzzles

The game was based on the 1989 Sam & Max comic On The Road, which featured the two on a journey across the United States. Several of the game's tourist traps were based on real locations experienced by the developers; Steve Purcell recollects a childhood visit to a "Frog Rock" - one of the locations featured in the game - and remembered thinking "That's it? It doesn't even look like a frog!" A chain of "Snuckey's" roadside stores and attractions was a tribute to the Stuckey's chain which Purcell and his family often stopped at during road trips.

LucasArts planned a relatively short timetable for Sam & Max of about eight months, and the team opted to use storyboarding for the first time at LucasArts to plan out the game. Sam & Max was one of the first games to include a full speech soundtrack and music, which for Steve Purcell was a "dream opportunity" to hear his creations speak. Steve Purcell describes casting Bill Farmer in the role of Sam as his audition tape "was very dry; he wasn't trying too hard to sell the lines". Actor Nick Jameson was cast to voice Max. The game's jazz score was composed by LucasArts' Clint Bajakian, Michael Land and Peter McConnell, and was incorporated into the game using Land and McConnell's iMUSE engine, which allowed for audio to be synchronized with the visuals. High quality versions of four of the game's tracks were included on the CD version of the game. Sam & Max Hit the Road was released simultaneously on floppy disk and CD-ROM; only the CD version of the game contained full in-game speech and music.

As the Sam & Max comics had a more adult tone, Steve Purcell expected LucasArts to cut back "the edgier material" from the game, but expressed that he was pleased with how LucasArts allowed him to stay close to his original vision for the game. The game's various minigames were included to allow players to take a break from solving the main game's puzzles and play something "short and silly". Sam & Max Hit the Road also signified a major change in development for games on the SCUMM engine. The user interface was entirely rehauled from that introduced in Maniac Mansion and built upon in subsequent games. Instead of selecting a verb function from a list at the bottom of the screen and clicking on an in-game entity, Sam & Max Hit the Road compressed all verb functions into the mouse cursor, which players could cycle through using the right-mouse button. The inventory was also moved off the main screen to a sub-screen accessible by a small icon on the screen. According to Steve Purcell, this cleared space on the screen to "expand on the excellent backgrounds and also made interaction much quicker and less laborious than LucasArts' previous adventure games" The conversation trees were also affected by this; Michael Stemmle proposed removing the text-based selection menu used in previous LucasArts' adventure games in favor of icons representing topics of discussion as "nothing would kill a joke worse than reading it before you hear it". Several of these innovations were retained for future LucasArts adventure games.

== Reception ==
Reception

Aggregate score
Aggregator	Score
GameRankings	84% (based on 6 reviews)

Review scores
Publication	Score
Adventure Gamers	4.5/5
AllGame	4.5/5
Computer and Video Games	82/100; 84/100 (CD-ROM)
Dragon	4/5
Edge	9/10
Hyper	93%
PC Format	92%
Electronic Entertainment	10 out of 10

According to Steve Purcell, Sam & Max Hit the Road was commercially successful. He remarked in 2000 that the numbers were never comparable to Star Wars but it sold enough that it was considered a hit by most standards.

Sam & Max received a favorable reception from the gaming industry's press, holding a rating of 84% on the review aggregator site GameRankings. Charles Ardai of Computer Gaming World in 1994 liked it "measurably less" than Day of the Tentacle. He compared the latter to a Looney Tunes cartoon and the former to an underground comic book, observing that Sam & Max's style of humor "can all be funny, but only to a point ... its main characters are basically jerks" and the story was unimportant "even to them". Ardai cited the completely optional and disconnected minigames as "contribut[ing] to the feeling that Sam & Max is more a computerized busybox ... than a unified, focused piece of fiction". He liked the graphics and simplified SCUMM interface, but concluded that "the whole is rather less than the sum of its parts ... Sam & Max affords a couple of hours of somewhat similar amusement" to Tentacle. Edge noted that "with most adventure games, its hard to feel anything for the character(s) you control", but stated that Sam & Max Hit the Road broke this mold by being "genuinely funny". The reviewer praised the game's graphics as "beautifully detailed" and the puzzles as "intricate to solve", but noted that a number of the minigames were "dismal". Joonas Linkola, writing for Adventure Gamers, echoed many of these comments, praising the cartoon-style graphics as "appropriately cheesy" and "colorful". On the subject of the game's humor, Linkola noted that "there are many visual jokes, but the backbone of the game is in its witty dialogue", and as such this gave the game a "replayability value" as players may pick up on jokes based on "verbal acrobatics, on the use of polysyllabic words, old English and other such oddities" that they missed the first time around. Linkola gave additional praise to the soundtrack and audio work, stating that the "very fitting voices ... adds to the comical duo's wisecracking attitude".

Allgame reviewer Steve Honeywell was also very positive with his comments, describing the plot as "interesting", the graphics as "appropriately cartoonish and fun" and the locations as "well-designed", but noting that above all "what makes Sam & Max Hit the Road work is the humor". On the game's puzzles, Honeywell stated that "some of the puzzles are pretty simple, while others are difficult in the extreme. One nice thing is the almost complete absence of red herring items. Everything you find can be put to use somewhere". As with other reviews, Allgame praised the audio work, noting that "the music is decent throughout the game, and the voice talent is stellar", closing with the comment that the game takes point-and-click adventures to "insane new heights in terms of both fun and comedy".

The game was one of four nominees for the 1994 Annie Award in the category Best Animated CD-ROM, although the award instead went to LucasArts' Star Wars: Rebel Assault. In 1994, PC Gamer US named Sam & Max the 8th best computer game ever.

In 1998, PC Gamer declared it the 10th-best computer game ever released, and the editors called it "still the best graphic adventure for the PC, hands down".

Sam and Max Hit the Road has since come to be regarded as a classic adventure game title, and is regularly featured in listings of the top 100 games. In 1996, Computer Gaming World ranked it as the 95th best game of all time, calling it "the adventure game that redefined 'wacky'". The same year, Next Generation ranked it 27th best game of all time, explaining that its "goofy charm" was the tiebreaker in the decision to include it on the list instead of other acclaimed LucasArts games such as Day of the Tentacle. In 1999, Next Generation listed Sam & Max Hit the Road as number 45 on their "Top 50 Games of All Time", commenting that the game combined a bizarre plot with LucasArt's adventure game prowess and the robust SCUMM engine. In 2004, Adventure Gamers listed Sam & Max Hit the Road as the eighth-best adventure game of all time, describing it as "the most absurd and ridiculous game ever designed". IGN described Sam and Max Hit the Road in its 2007 top 100 games feature as "known more for its story and characters", noting that "the unusual and interesting gameplay is typically saddled in the shotgun position in fans' memories, but when you're driving a Porsche, even the trunk is a smooth ride". Writing for Adventure Classic Gaming in 2006, David Olgarsson noted that the game had "undoubtedly ... become [LucasArts'] most critically acclaimed adventure game of all time", citing the game's production values, graphical effects, challenging puzzles and story techniques as the reason for this, concluding that the game was an "enduring testament to adventure gaming's finest hours". In 2011, Adventure Gamers named Sam & Max the 28th-best adventure game ever released.

== Sequels ==
Sam & Max: Freelance Police was to take the franchise into 3D graphics.

The first attempts at creating a sequel took place in September 2001 with Sam & Max Plunge Through Space. The game was to be an Xbox exclusive title, developed by Infinite Machine, a small company consisting of a number of former LucasArts employees. The story of the game was developed by series creator Steve Purcell and fellow designer Chuck Jordan and involved the Freelance Police travelling the galaxy to find a stolen Statue of Liberty. However, Infinite Machine went bankrupt within a year, and the project was abandoned.

At the 2002 Electronic Entertainment Expo convention, nearly a decade after the release of Sam & Max Hit the Road, LucasArts announced the production of a PC sequel, entitled Sam & Max: Freelance Police. Freelance Police, like Hit the Road, was to be a point-and-click graphic adventure game, utilizing a new 3D game engine. Development of Freelance Police was led by Michael Stemmle, one of the original designers of Sam and Max Hit the Road. Steve Purcell contributed to the project by writing the story and producing concept art. The original voice actors for Sam and Max, Bill Farmer and Nick Jameson, were also set to reprise their roles. In March 2004, however, quite far into the game's development, Sam & Max: Freelance Police was abruptly cancelled by LucasArts, citing "current market place realities and underlying economic considerations" in a short press release. The fan reaction to the cancellation was strong; a petition of 32,000 signatures stating the disappointment of fans was later presented to LucasArts.

After LucasArts' license with Steve Purcell expired in 2005, the Sam & Max franchise moved to Telltale Games, a company of former LucasArts employees who had worked on a number of LucasArts adventure games, including on the development of Freelance Police. Under Telltale Games, a new episodic series of Sam & Max video games was made. Like both Sam & Max Hit the Road and Freelance Police, Sam & Max Save the World was in a point-and-click graphic adventure game format, although it lacked the original voice actors for the characters. The first season ran for six episodes, each with a self-contained storyline but with an overall story arc running through the series. The first episode was released on GameTap in October 2006, with episodes following regularly until April 2007, and a special compilation on the Wii released in October 2008. A second season, Sam & Max Beyond Time and Space, began in November 2007 and ended in April 2008. This was also released as a compilation on the Wii. Originally expected to be released in 2009, a third season, Sam & Max: The Devil's Playhouse, began in April 2010.
