= Jared Emerson-Johnson =

American video game composer

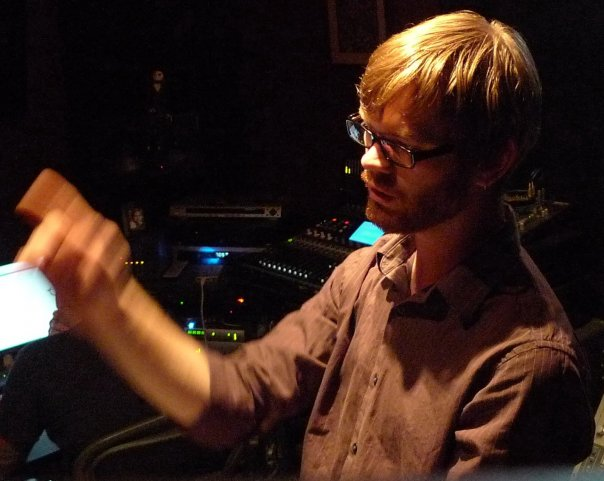
- Emerson-Johnson conducting a recording session at AudioSFX

Background information
- Born: Jared Nathaniel Emerson-Johnson; October 13, 1981 (age 45)
- Origin: San Francisco, California, U.S.
- Genres: Jazz; classical; video game music; ambient
- Occupations: Composer; voice actor; sound designer; voice director
- Instruments: Vocals; keyboards; guitar; violin; mandolin; ukulele; banjo
- Years active: 2002–present
- Website: Bay Area Sound

Jared Nathaniel Emerson-Johnson (born October 13, 1981) is an American video game music composer, sound designer, voice director and voice actor. Emerson-Johnson is the Music Supervisor and lead composer at Bay Area Sound, an audio production company specializing in sound design, music and voiceover for video games. His work has been predominantly featured in games developed by Telltale.

== Career ==
Jared began his career as an assistant to composer Clint Bajakian on the score for LucasArts' Indiana Jones and the Emperor's Tomb. Emerson-Johnson has also worked as a sound designer for projects, including James Bond 007: Everything or Nothing, The Lord of the Rings: The Return of the King, Psychonauts, and Firewatch. Emerson-Johnson is perhaps best known as the composer behind multiple video games produced by Telltale Games, such as Bone, Sam & Max, Strong Bad's Cool Game for Attractive People, Wallace & Gromit's Grand Adventures, Poker Night at the Inventory, Back to the Future: The Game, Jurassic Park: The Game, The Walking Dead, The Wolf Among Us, Game of Thrones, Batman: The Telltale Series, and Guardians of the Galaxy: The Telltale Series.

In all three seasons of Sam & Max, he voices the C.O.P.S., a group of obsolete computers. In Tales of Monkey Island, he plays the Marquis DeSinge as well as the Thief.

In 2004, Emerson-Johnson received the Game Audio Network Guild's "Rookie of the Year" award. Jared's score, voice direction, and sound design for Telltale Games' Bone: The Great Cow Race were finalists for the 2007 Independent Games Festival. His score for Telltale Games' Sam & Max Beyond Time and Space was also a finalist for Best Original Score in the 2008 IGN PC Awards. He shares an AdventureGamers.com 2009 Aggie award for best voice acting for his work on Tales of Monkey Island.

His score for Telltale Games’ The Walking Dead was nominated for Best Music of the year at the British Academy Games Awards in 2013.

== Discography ==
=== Video game soundtracks ===
- The Bard's Tale (2004)
- Bone: Out from Boneville (2005)
- America's Army: Rise of a Soldier (2005)
- Bone: The Great Cow Race (2006)
- Sam & Max Save the World (2006–2007)
- Alien Syndrome (2007)
- Sam & Max Beyond Time and Space (2007–2008)
- Strong Bad's Cool Game for Attractive People (2008)
- Wallace & Gromit's Grand Adventures (2009)
- Sam & Max: The Devil's Playhouse (2010)
- Nelson Tethers: Puzzle Agent (2010)
- Poker Night at the Inventory (2010)
- Back to the Future: The Game (2010-2011)
- Puzzle Agent 2 (2011)
- Jurassic Park: The Game (2011)
- Double Fine Happy Action Theater (2012)
- The Walking Dead (2012)
- Poker Night 2 (2013)
- The Wolf Among Us (2013)
- The Walking Dead: Season Two (2013)
- Tales from the Borderlands (2014)
- Game of Thrones (video game) (2014)
- The Walking Dead: Michonne (2016)
- Batman: The Telltale Series (2016)
- The Walking Dead: A New Frontier (2017)
- Batman: The Enemy Within (2017)
- Guardians of the Galaxy: The Telltale Series (2017)
- The Walking Dead: The Final Season (2018)
- Nick Bounty and the Dame with the Blue Chewed Shoe (2020)
- Sam & Max Save the World Remastered (2020)
- Sam & Max: This Time It's Virtual (2021)
- I Expect You To Die 2: The Spy And The Liar (2021)
- Sam & Max Beyond Time and Space Remastered (2021)
- Demon Quest '85 (2021)
- Sasquatchers (2021)
- Forrest Byrnes: Up in Smoke (2022)
- Star Trek: Resurgence (2023)
- Sam & Max: The Devil's Playhouse Remastered (2024)
- The Wolf Among Us 2 (2027)

=== Other works ===
- Mr. Lux At Your Service (2008)
- YouTube Presents: The Birds and the Biz (2008)

=== BAFTA Games Awards ===
Year	Project	Category	Result
2013	The Walking Dead	Best Original Music	Nominated

=== Golden Joystick Awards ===
Year	Project	Category	Result
2014	The Wolf Among Us	Best Audio	Nominated

=== Game Audio Network Guild Awards ===
Year	Project	Category	Result	Notes
2015	The Walking Dead: Season Two	Best Dialog	Nominated	
2013	The Walking Dead	Best Dialog	Won	
2012	Star Wars: The Old Republic	Best Soundtrack Album	Won	
2004	LeapFrog Leapster: SpongeBob SquarePants	Best Audio - Other	Won	
2004	Himself (with Cris Velasco)	Rookie of the Year	Won	

=== Independent Games Festival ===
Year	Project	Category	Result
2007	Bone: The Great Cow Race	Excellence in Audio	Nominated

=== Golden Joystick Awards ===
Year	Project	Category	Result
2014	The Wolf Among Us	Best Audio	Nominated

== Jug Band ==
In addition to his work in entertainment music scoring, Jared is also the front man of the Rivertown Skifflers, a northern California based jug band.
