= Michael Stemmle =

American video game designer

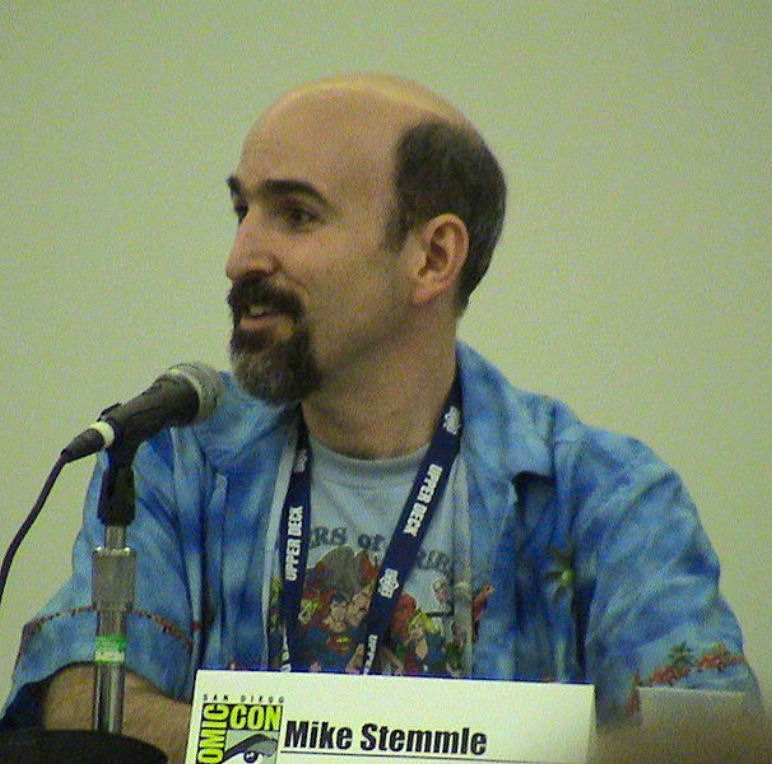
- Stemmle at the 2008 Comic-Con International; Photo courtesy of Mike Haley
- Born: 1967 (age 58–59)
- Education: Stanford University
- Occupations: Game designer, game writer, game director

Michael J. Stemmle (born 1967) is a computer game writer, designer, and director who cocreated some of LucasArts' adventure games in the 1990s and early 2000s.

He joined LucasArts after graduating from Stanford University, where he honed his comedy skills writing halftime shows for the Stanford Band and skits for the annual stage musical Big Game Gaieties. After 14 years at LucasArts, he left following the 2004 collapse of Sam & Max Freelance Police and after a period of freelancing, joined Perpetual Entertainment, working as Story Lead for Star Trek Online. In February 2008, he joined a number of other ex-LucasArts employees at Telltale Games. He had worked on the first version of The Wolf Among Us before it was redesigned, and contributed to Tales from the Borderlands before he left Telltale Games in May 2014.

== Game credits ==
Year	Title	Role	Developer	Notes
1990	The Secret of Monkey Island	Designer	Lucasfilm Games	256 colors version
1992	Indiana Jones and the Fate of Atlantis	Lead scripter, assistant designer, programmer	LucasArts	
1993	Sam & Max Hit the Road	Co-director, co-designer	LucasArts	
1996	Afterlife	Director, designer	LucasArts	
2000	Escape from Monkey Island	Co-director, co-designer	LucasArts	
2002	Star Wars Jedi Knight II: Jedi Outcast	Script writer	Raven Software	
2004	Sam & Max Freelance Police	Director, designer	LucasArts	Unreleased
2005	Star Wars: Battlefront II	Script writer	Pandemic Studios	
2007	Star Trek Online	Story lead	Perpetual Entertainment	Unreleased version, before transfer to Cryptic Studios
2008	Strong Bad's Cool Game for Attractive People	Designer, script writer	Telltale Games	
2009	Tales of Monkey Island	Designer, script writer	Telltale Games	
2010	Sam & Max: The Devil's Playhouse	Designer, script writer	Telltale Games	
2011	Back to the Future: The Game	Designer, script writer	Telltale Games	
2013	Poker Night 2	Script writer, programmer	Telltale Games	
2014	The Wolf Among Us	Designer, script writer	Telltale Games	First version before redesign
2014	Tales from the Borderlands	Designer	Telltale Games	
2021	Sam & Max: This Time It's Virtual	Designer, script writer	Telltale Games	
