= Sam & Max Save the World =

2006-2007 episodic video game

- Promotional artwork for Sam & Max Save the World.
- Developer: Telltale Games (Note: Remastered version developed by Skunkape Games.)
- Publisher: Telltale Games (Note: Windows and Wii physical versions published by The Adventure Company. Xbox 360 version published by Microsoft Game Studios. Remastered version published by Skunkape Games.)
- Designers: Brendan Q. Ferguson; Dave Grossman; Steve Purcell; Jeff Lester; Chuck Jordan; Heather Logas
- Programmer: Randy Tudor
- Artist: David Bogan
- Writers: Brendan Q. Ferguson; Dave Grossman; Steve Purcell; Jeff Lester; Chuck Jordan; Heather Logas
- Composer: Jared Emerson-Johnson
- Series: Sam & Max
- Engine: Telltale Tool
- Platforms: Microsoft Windows; Wii; Xbox 360; Nintendo Switch; Xbox One; PlayStation 4
- Release: Microsoft Windows 2006 – 2007: Episodes; October 17, 2006 – April 26, 2007; Season One; July 18, 2007 (Note: Collector's Edition); August 7, 2007 (Note: Retail); Remastered; December 2, 2020; Wii; NA: October 14, 2008; EU: December 2, 2008; Xbox 360; June 17, 2009; Nintendo Switch; December 2, 2020; Xbox One; August 10, 2021; PlayStation 4; September 29, 2022
- Genre: Graphic adventure
- Mode: Single-player

Sam & Max Save the World is a graphic adventure video game developed by Telltale Games. The game was originally released as Sam & Max: Season One before being renamed in early 2009. Save the World was developed in an episodic fashion, comprising six episodes that were released for Microsoft Windows over the course of late 2006 and early 2007. The episodes were initially distributed online by GameTap and Telltale Games themselves, although the later retail releases of the game were published by The Adventure Company. A Wii port of the game was published in late 2008, and an Xbox Live Arcade version was released in mid-2009. A remaster of the game by Skunkape Games was released in December 2020 for Nintendo Switch and Microsoft Windows, in August 2021 for Xbox One, and in September 2022 for PlayStation 4.

Based on Steve Purcell's comic book series Sam & Max, the game follows the title characters Sam and Max—self-styled vigilante private investigators, the former an anthropomorphic dog and the latter a "hyperkinetic rabbity thing"—through several cases involving a hypnotism conspiracy. Each episode features one case with a contained story, with an underlying plot running through the series. The game was announced by Telltale Games in 2005 following the cancellation of Sam & Max: Freelance Police by LucasArts in the preceding year; many of the employees at Telltale Games were members of the Freelance Police development team.

The game received a positive response from critics, with praise bestowed on the game's humor, graphics and gameplay, but concerns were voiced over the low difficulty of the puzzles, repetition in design between episodes and the effectiveness of the story. Opinions dissented across the Atlantic; some British reviewers did not appreciate the writing in the way that American critics did. Nevertheless, the game has won several awards and is often cited by commentators as the first successful application of episodic distribution. The game was accompanied by a number of short machinima videos set between each episode. The game was followed by two episodic sequels: Sam & Max Beyond Time and Space in 2007 and Sam & Max: The Devil's Playhouse in 2010.

== Gameplay ==
Sam & Max Save the World is a 3D graphic adventure game in which the player controls the character of Sam. The player has Sam explore the environments of the game and solve a series of puzzles using a simple point-and-click interface. The game's puzzles have logical solutions, although a number of them have far-fetched solutions due to the game's cartoon setting. Depending on the type of in-game entity a player selects using the cursor, the player can have Sam walk around an area, look at and comment on objects, pick up certain items or otherwise try to use them. Sam may also engage in conversation with non-player characters; when this occurs, the game presents a dialog tree with several subjects to pick from. Topics of conversation may directly involve the story or provide assistance with the game's puzzles, while others may be entirely unconnected. In some cases, the player may be able to choose dialog for Max to speak as well.

The game implements an inventory system to allow Sam to store any items that the player picks up during the course of the game. The player may select any of the items in the inventory and can then attempt to use them on objects in the game world or give them to other characters simply by clicking on the desired target. Unlike Save the World's predecessor, Sam & Max Hit the Road, inventory items are context specific, and cannot be used together or combined to create new items. Typically, Sam carries a gun that may be used to solve several puzzles.

The characters can travel between a variety of locations in the game using their black and white 1960 DeSoto Adventurer, which, when selected, will present the player with a list of available destinations. The DeSoto is also used for several driving sequences, usually involving pursuing or fleeing criminals in other vehicles. In these driving sequences, the player can use Sam's gun, the car's horn, or have Max attempt to communicate with other vehicles via a megaphone. In addition, special inventory items may be used to complete specific puzzles within these sequences. Driving sequences are also used for several minigames, such as pulling innocent drivers over for fabricated felonies. In keeping with the developer's heritage from the LucasArts adventure games, Sam & Max Save the World is designed so that the player characters cannot die or reach a complete dead-end.

== Synopsis ==
=== Characters ===
Sam & Max Save the World is set in a universe that parodies American popular culture, and it follows the title characters of Sam and Max, the Freelance Police, a pair of vigilantes and private investigators. Sam is a level-headed but enthusiastic anthropomorphic dog who wears a blue suit and fedora. He is inquisitive, knowledgeable in obscure areas and tends to prefer the logical solution to problems, but he is not above using force. Max is described as a "hyperkinetic rabbity thing"; cunning, uninhibited and reveling in violence and mischief. His reactions to situations usually incorporate force but often with a seeming disregard for his own personal safety. Together, the Freelance Police operate out of a dilapidated office block in a dangerous New York City neighborhood, where they receive cases over the telephone from an unseen police commissioner.

There are several supporting characters that consistently appear throughout the episodes.

Roscoe Bosco is the proprietor of the nearby convenience store and supplies the Freelance Police with a number of items across the game. Driven paranoid by repeated shoplifting, Bosco is obsessed with conspiracies, believing that nearly every US government agency, as well as many criminal outfits, are after him. As such, his store is overwhelmed with security devices and contraptions created by Bosco himself. He regularly attempts to disguise himself as a variety of foreign nationals, but to little effect.

Further down the neighborhood is Sybil Pandemik, who owns a small office across from Sam and Max. Sybil is unable to keep a consistent job and regularly changes her career choices. Introduced as a psychotherapist and former tattoo artist, she later becomes a tabloid journalist, professional witness, professional matchmaker, software tester, and Queen of Canada over the course of Save the World.

In a hole in Sam and Max's own office resides Jimmy Two-Teeth, a rat who works as a petty criminal, confidence trickster and fence. He profusely dislikes Sam and Max, who he sees as always interfering with his work.

Other characters include the Soda Poppers, a group of three former child stars from the 1970s. The three, each with their own trademark catch-phrase, first appear as victims of hypnosis in the first episode, later acting as the judges on a Pop Idol parody in the second episode. By the fourth episode, they are elected the governors of the Dakotas and plunge the region into civil war over ownership of Mount Rushmore. Also making sporadic appearances is Hugh Bliss, an eccentric magician and leader of the Prismatology cult, a parody of Scientology. He is often seen attempting to promote his self-help guides based on Prismatology. Sam finds Bliss irritating, while Max almost idolizes him. Minor characters include Agent Superball, a US Secret Service agent with a penchant for guarding doors; Chuckles, the pit manager in a mafia-run casino; Harry Moleman, a police mole who switches sides;, the Computer Obsolescence Prevention Society (COPS), a group of outdated computers attempting to find purpose in the technologically advanced world, and Abe Lincoln, initially the entire section of the statue of Abraham Lincoln inside the Lincoln Memorial but reduced to a talking head after being almost completely destroyed during "Abe Lincoln Must Die!".

=== Plot ===
The game opens with Sam and Max, the Freelance Police, lounging in their office, awaiting a new case after a long hiatus. Eventually, the commissioner sends them out to investigate a group of former child stars, the Soda Poppers, who have been causing trouble in the neighborhood. The Soda Poppers are attempting to promote a self-help video called Eye-Bo, which (when watched) hypnotizes the viewer. After seeking assistance from Sybil to reverse the hypnotism on the Soda Poppers by knocking them unconscious, the Freelance Police learn that the scheme has been devised by one Brady Culture, another former child star who owes his fall from popularity to the rise of the Soda Poppers. Sam and Max and the Soda Poppers confront Culture, who hypnotizes the Soda Poppers again. However, Sam manages to fool Culture into ordering the Soda Poppers to attack himself, subduing the threat. The next case the Freelance Police get involves liberating a studio audience held hostage by a deranged TV talk show host, Myra Stump. At the TV station, Sam and Max deduce that Myra has been hypnotized and, after using other shows in the studio to become celebrities, they convince her to let them become guests on her show. Once on the show, Sam notes a strange toy bear on the host's desk, the source of the hypnotism. Using the studio sound system, Sam electrocutes both Myra and the bear, allowing the audience to leave.

Sam and Max in their office; the game's environments were designed to feel more coarse and dangerous than those in Sam & Max Hit the Road

The commissioner then tasks Sam and Max with infiltrating the Toy Mafia, a criminal organisation operating from a casino. The commissioner's mole in the organisation has gone quiet; he wants the Freelance Police to find out what happened to the mole. Sam and Max quickly discover that the Toy Mafia are responsible for the toy bear that hypnotised Myra. As they gain the Mafia's trust, they ascertain that the mole has switched sides and is now leading the outfit. After discovering that the casino is a front for a factory producing the hypnotizing bears for mass distribution, the Freelance Police sabotage the factory and destroy the operation. Soon after, the US President starts bringing in bizarre policies; Max is particularly concerned about the introduction of gun restrictions, while Sam believes the President has been hypnotized. At the White House, Max beheads the President, revealing him to be a mechanical puppet designed to hypnotize the nation through TV broadcasts. The President's bodyguard, none other than the now-fallen Toy Mafia's pit boss, activates a giant robot disguised as the statue at the Lincoln Memorial to run in an emergency election against Max. Sam discredits Lincoln's campaign, resulting in Max winning the presidential election. Lincoln begins a destructive rampage through Washington D.C., but is neutralized when Max fires an intercontinental ballistic missile at him.

The next case given to Sam and Max involves dealing with a computer crisis that is causing the world economy to collapse. They discover the problem is a virtual reality program called Reality 2.0, powered by the Internet (which has gained sentience), which is hypnotizing people so they never want to leave the program. Sam and Max access the program themselves and introduce a computer virus that crashes Reality 2.0 and deletes the digital embodiment of the Internet. Prior to expiring, the Internet reveals that it was following the plans of one Roy G. Biv. Sam eventually deduces that Roy G. Biv is actually Hugh Bliss, a character seemingly in the background of all their previous cases. The Freelance Police travel to Bliss' Prismatology retreat on the Moon, where Bliss is preparing a device to hypnotize the entire planet. Bliss reveals himself as a colony of sentient bacteria that feeds off of the endorphins produced by human happiness; by hypnotizing the planet, Bliss assures himself of a permanent supply of nourishment. Bliss activates the device, but is killed when Sam tricks him into a tank of water and boils it using the rocket engine of a lunar lander. Returning to Earth, Max takes great pleasure in reversing the hypnotism by personally knocking everyone on the planet unconscious.

== Episodes ==
Episode	Designer/Writer	Release date	
Episode	Designer/Writer	GameTap release	General release
"Culture Shock"	Brendan Q. Ferguson; Dave Grossman; Steve Purcell	October 17, 2006	November 1, 2006
A group of former child stars, the Soda Poppers, are hypnotized into causing trouble in Sam and Max's neighborhood.
"Situation: Comedy"	Brendan Q. Ferguson; Dave Grossman; Jeff Lester; Steve Purcell	December 20, 2006	January 5, 2007
Sam and Max must deal with a talk show host who has taken her audience hostage.
"The Mole, the Mob, and the Meatball"	Brendan Q. Ferguson; Dave Grossman; Jeff Lester; Steve Purcell	January 25, 2007	February 8, 2007
A mole in a nearby mafia outfit has gone quiet, so Sam and Max are tasked with finding out what happened to him.
"Abe Lincoln Must Die!"	Brendan Q. Ferguson; Dave Grossman; Chuck Jordan; Steve Purcell	February 22, 2007	March 9, 2007
Believing that the US president has been hypnotized, Sam and Max journey to Washington to save him.
"Reality 2.0"	Brendan Q. Ferguson; Dave Grossman; Heather Logas; Chuck Jordan; Steve Purcell	March 29, 2007	April 9, 2007
An Internet craze is hypnotizing people across the world, so Sam and Max try to destroy the Internet.
"Bright Side of the Moon"	Brendan Q. Ferguson; Dave Grossman; Heather Logas; Chuck Jordan; Steve Purcell	April 26, 2007	May 10, 2007
Having discovered what is behind the hypnotism cases, Sam and Max travel to the Moon to save the world.

== Machinima ==
For the release of each episode, Telltale Games released three corresponding machinima shorts. These shorts are set between the episodes; fifteen were released in total. The first short, "Frank Discussion", released on November 30, 2006, has Sam and Max share a discussion regarding frankfurters and their preservative properties in Bosco's store. The short was followed on December 7 by "Trainspotting", in which Sam ponders the meaning of life while Max questions the sensibility of being outside, away from the comforts of their office. On December 12, Telltale released "A Painstaking Search": having misplaced the keys to their office, Sam and Max return to Brady Culture's hideout in an attempt to retrace their steps. The first short of 2007, "Reality Blights", was released on January 4 and sees Max volunteer the duo to appear on a reality television show, Four Freaks in a Terribly Cramped Office. "Egregious Philosophy Platter" was released seven days later on January 11 and features Sam and Max as host the hosts of television show Egregious Philosophy Platter, discussing the philosophers Socrates and Descartes. The final short relating to television shows, "Kitchen Consequential", was released on January 18 and follows Sam and Max hosting Fun in the Kitchen With Sam and Max where they showcase a few recipes of special effects.

"Interrogation" was released after the game's third episode on February 1, in which Sam and Max demonstrate how to properly interrogate a suspect. This was followed by "Coffee" on February 8; in the short, Sam and Max experiment with telekinesis on coffee cups. On February 15, "The Blank Blank Blank" was released, where Sam and Max discuss with Bosco a government agency so secret, the acronym is classified. Following episodes relate to Max's tenure as US president after "Abe Lincoln Must Die!"; "War Games", released on March 1, has Sam and Max engage in military activities from the White House's war room under the pretense that they are mere simulations. It was followed by "The Teapot Drone Scandal" on March 15, in which Max orders a Secret Service agent to recite "I'm a Little Teapot" over the telephone. "Saving the Economy" was released on March 22, showing a broadcast by Max outlining his plans to make the economy more efficient by irrationally extending daylight saving time. On April 5, "Artichoke" was released, in which Max holds a press conference where he is unwisely questioned about his gun control policies. The penultimate short, "Bosco", was released on April 12, and shows Max starting a negative campaign against Bosco for the presidential election, despite the fact that he is not running. "A Fireside Chat", the final episode, was released on April 19, depicting a broadcast by Max to the state of Idaho in the hopes of getting them to vote for him.

== Development ==
=== Production ===
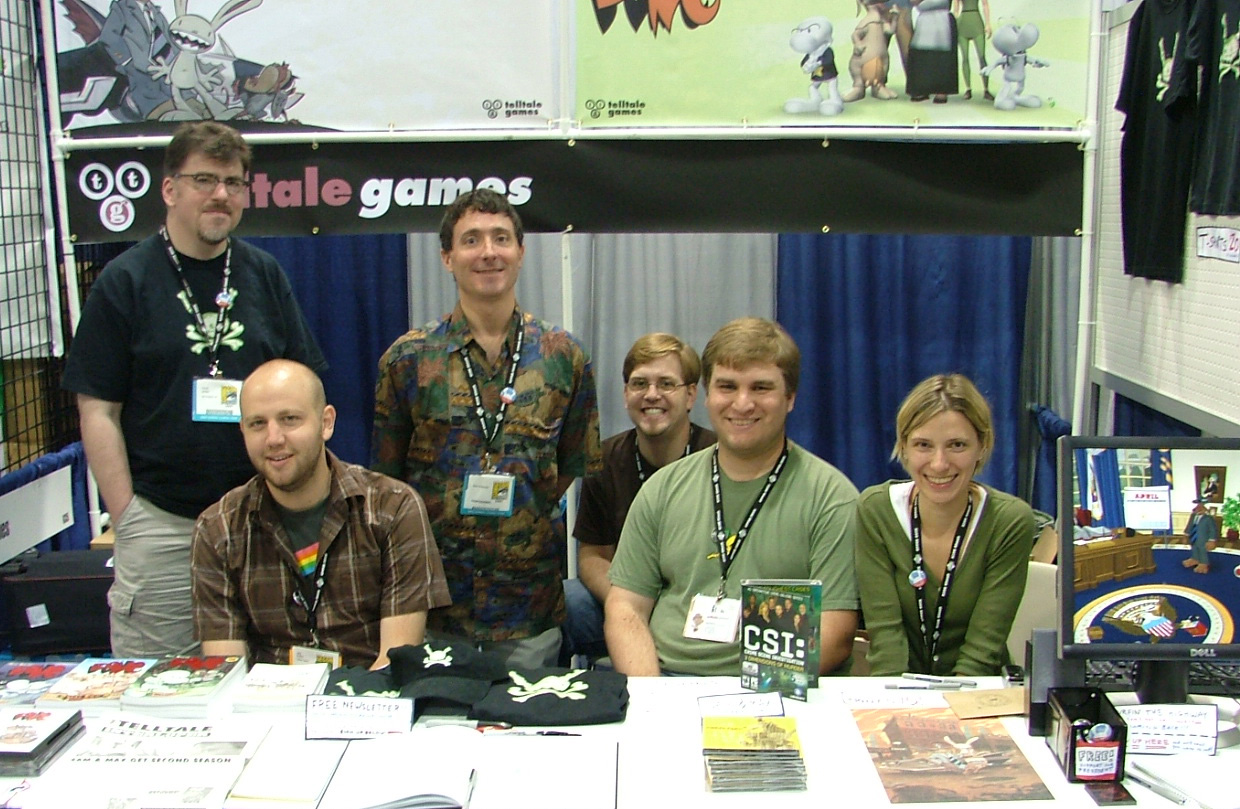
Telltale Games consisted of developers from Freelance Police, as well as other former LucasArts alumni such as Dave Grossman (third from left).

Sam & Max Save the World originates from Sam & Max: Freelance Police, a graphic adventure game that was developed by LucasArts from 2002 to 2004. Freelance Police was a sequel to the 1993 title Sam & Max Hit the Road. However, LucasArts ceased production on Freelance Police in March 2004. In the subsequent weeks, LucasArts underwent major restructuring; many of the developers who worked on past LucasArts adventure games were made redundant. Some of the former Freelance Police development team consequently formed Telltale Games in June 2004 to continue developing the sort of adventure games that LucasArts no longer wished to produce. Sam & Max creator Steve Purcell, who described himself as disappointed and frustrated with LucasArts' decision, took the Sam & Max franchise to Telltale after the LucasArts license expired in mid-2005. Telltale Games announced the new series of Sam & Max games in September 2005. Brendan Q. Ferguson, who worked on Freelance Police as a programmer, designer and writer; Dave Grossman, one of the project leaders on Maniac Mansion: Day of the Tentacle; and Purcell primarily led the development of the project.

Unlike Freelance Police, Save the World was developed in episodic form, with episodes being released in quick succession, to allow for reduced development time between titles and quicker delivery of content to consumers. Telltale launched a website for Sam & Max in November to accompany their new series. The following month, Purcell began publishing a Sam & Max webcomic entitled "The Big Sleep" on the site; the webcomic ran for twelve issues and concluded in April 2007. Purcell won an Eisner Award in 2007 for the webcomic. In March 2006, Telltale acquired US$825,000 in funding from a group of private investors, to help sustain growth until its next round of equity funding.

Telltale released the game's trailer for the Electronic Entertainment Expo in May 2006, showing the new voice actors for Sam and Max. Initially, David Nowlin was cast to voice both characters, however it was later decided that Nowlin would only voice Sam and a separate voice actor, Andrew Chaikin would voice Max. Chaikin would only be cast in the first episode, as he was unable to continue his role for health reasons. While at the convention, Telltale revealed that the first episode was forecast for release towards the end of 2006, via the distribution service GameTap. Telltale announced a release date of October 17 over GameTap in early September, with the note that each episode would be made available from Telltale themselves within fifteen days of release. Development on the first episode was completed on September 25, and from October 10, GameTap began hosting the Sam & Max animated series as promotional material for release. The first episode, "Culture Shock", was released on-time on October 17. The next five episodes were released over short intervals until the series finale in April 2007. The series debuted on Steam on June 15 the same year. Telltale began shipping a special collectors edition of the game in July, while the retail version of the game was published in August. January 2008 saw a significant update to the game, upgrading the game engine and ensuring compatibility with Windows Vista.

Three months later, Telltale announced a Wii version of the game. Telltale reported that an email campaign and Internet rumors of a port had stirred up interest within the company for producing a Wii version. They redesigned the game's point-and-click interface to accommodate the Wii Remote, the primary controller for the console. The game was initially forecast for release in North America on October 7, 2008, but was released a week later on October 14. The European version was published later in December.

In February 2009, Telltale Games renamed the game from its initial release title of Sam & Max: Season One to Sam & Max Save the World. Telltale's public relations spokeswoman, Emily Morganti, explained that while Season One was thought to communicate the game's episodic nature to potential consumers, the company felt that it was nondescript in relation to the game's story. The message accompanied the announcement of an Xbox Live Arcade version of the game, which had been subject to media speculation since February 2007. Both Windows and Wii versions of the game were republished using the new title.

=== Design ===
Series creator Steve Purcell was involved in ensuring that the characters and environments of the game conveyed the same feel as the comics

According to Dave Grossman, the objective for Telltale Games with Sam & Max Save the World was to create a game with a "lot of story and character in it". Grossman explained that the Sam & Max franchise was therefore most ideally suited to the graphic adventure genre; while action was thought to be possible with the source material, it "would be kind of wrong". Still, designers decided to introduce action moments such as car chase scenes, wanting players to "feel like [they] are these crazy Freelance Police officers" and "just be involved in all this sort of mayhem" presented in the original comic strips. Like in previous Sam & Max games, Sam & Max Save the World used a point-and-click gameplay system, itself a variation of the control scheme used by Telltale in their preceding adventure game series, Bone; the action sequences implemented in the game still maintained the point-and-click interface.

Very little of the design from Freelance Police was carried over into Save the World; LucasArts still held onto the assets created for use in Freelance Police, and Telltale was wary of using similar design patterns. While Ferguson and Purcell had both been involved with the canceled LucasArts project, Grossman had not. The team decided to just start from fresh, and pursue a different treatment of the game's subject. Purcell himself wanted to ensure that the game conveyed the "gritty" feel of the original comics—something he felt was lacking from the LucasArts renditions of the franchise. Grossman stated that "we wanted to get a little bit more of that dirt on the streets, and the paper cups and people being mean and nasty". This "gritty" feeling also influenced artistic design. For instance, on Purcell's suggestion, the sky was changed from blue to yellow in the street outside Sam and Max's office, instantly making the environment feel "filthy and disgusting".

=== Audio ===
Bay Area Sound, a company set up by Clint Bajakian, who had worked extensively on composition and sound production on LucasArts games since 1994, produced the soundtrack. The Save the World soundtrack was composed by Jared Emerson-Johnson, Bajakian's former protégé, whose previous work included composition and sound editing for LucasArts. Emerson-Johnson's scores used live performances as opposed to synthesized music often used elsewhere in the video games industry; a small team of five musicians, including Emerson-Johnson and a recording engineer, produced the soundtrack. The score is primarily grounded in film noir jazz, inspired by the work of Henry Mancini and Charles Mingus. However, Emerson-Johnson noted that as the Sam & Max universe is "open-ended", he had the chance to explore into other musical genres in some episodes, such as "a song-and-dance Charleston number, faux Philip Glass, an ode to Nina Rota's music from The Godfather, and even some inspired retro 8-bit game music". Several songs were incorporated into the soundtrack, performed by Emerson-Johnson or Peter Barto, the voice actor for Agent Superball. Purcell later commented that Emerson-Johnson had seamlessly blended a "huge palette of genres and styles", while Ferguson stated that he believed that it was Emerson-Johnson's scores that created the vital atmosphere in the games, noting that prior to the implementation of the music, playing the games was an "unrelenting horror". The soundtrack to Sam & Max Save the World was published in July 2007.

Sam & Max Season One Soundtrack disk one track list
No.	Title	Length
1.	"Opening Credits"	0:44
2.	"The New Case" (from "Culture Shock")	0:58
3.	"The Office" (from "Culture Shock")	3:18
4.	"Fuzzy White Butterfingers" (from "Culture Shock")	0:54
5.	"City Streets" (from "Culture Shock")	3:12
6.	"Bosco's" (from "Culture Shock")	4:06
7.	"Eye-Bo Unveiled" (from "Culture Shock")	1:07
8.	"Sybil's" (from "Culture Shock")	3:03
9.	"Behind the Poppers" (from "Culture Shock")	1:15
10.	"I Can See You" (from "Culture Shock")	0:32
11.	"Cruisin'" (from "Culture Shock")	1:28
12.	"More Than Jerks" (from "Culture Shock")	1:31
13.	"The Black Hole" (from "Culture Shock")	3:14
14.	"Master Plans" (from "Culture Shock")	1:40
15.	"Attack the Dog" (from "Culture Shock")	4:00
16.	"Attack Me" (from "Culture Shock")	0:59
17.	"High Noon Hostage Crisis" (from "Situation: Comedy")	0:32
18.	"Skinbodies Rule the Streets" (from "Situation: Comedy")	0:31
19.	"Quiet on the Set" (from "Situation: Comedy")	6:58
20.	"Mad Dog" (from "Situation: Comedy")	0:38
21.	"Midtown Cowboys" (from "Situation: Comedy")	0:07
22.	"Cooking Without Looking" (from "Situation: Comedy")	0:54
23.	"Who's Never Going to Be a Millionaire" (from "Situation: Comedy")	0:15
24.	"Time Out for Number Two" (from "Situation: Comedy")	0:42
25.	"Myra!" (from "Situation: Comedy")	1:01
26.	"Electrotalk Therapy" (from "Situation: Comedy")	1:06
27.	"Cirque De Molé" (from "The Mole, the Mob, and the Meatball")	1:33
28.	"Ted E. Bear's Mafia-Free Playland and Casino" (from "The Mole, the Mob, and the Meatball")	4:34
29.	"Just You and Me (and Ted E. Bear)" (from "The Mole, the Mob, and the Meatball")	1:21
30.	"Bear Arms" (from "The Mole, the Mob, and the Meatball")	0:22
31.	"One-Armed Bandit" (from "The Mole, the Mob, and the Meatball")	0:46
32.	"Whack Da Ratz" (from "The Mole, the Mob, and the Meatball")	0:21
33.	"Don Ted E. Bear Waltz" (from "The Mole, the Mob, and the Meatball")	2:39
34.	"Tactit Approval" (from "The Mole, the Mob, and the Meatball")	0:59
35.	"Ketchup Deception" (from "The Mole, the Mob, and the Meatball")	0:56
36.	"New Recruits" (from "The Mole, the Mob, and the Meatball")	0:16
37.	"Initiation Confrontation" (from "The Mole, the Mob, and the Meatball")	1:21
38.	"Behind the Door" (from "The Mole, the Mob, and the Meatball")	1:20
39.	"Cogs in Motion" (from "The Mole, the Mob, and the Meatball")	5:55
40.	"Death of a Lagomorph" (from "The Mole, the Mob, and the Meatball")	1:42
41.	"Critical Mass" (from "The Mole, the Mob, and the Meatball")	1:51
Total length:		1:11:46

Sam & Max Season One Soundtrack disk two track list
No.	Title	Length
1.	"Wrong Number" (from "Abe Lincoln Must Die!")	1:25
2.	"Lincoln vs. Max" (from "Abe Lincoln Must Die!")	3:52
3.	"Consecutive Officer" (from "Abe Lincoln Must Die!")	8:21
4.	"Rise of the Emancipator" (from "Abe Lincoln Must Die!")	1:54
5.	"Regime Change" (from "Abe Lincoln Must Die!")	1:26
6.	"Неудобство" (from "Abe Lincoln Must Die!")	0:43
7.	"Monumental Scandal" (from "Abe Lincoln Must Die!")	1:01
8.	"Inaugural Distress" (from "Abe Lincoln Must Die!")	0:35
9.	"Sore Loser" (from "Abe Lincoln Must Die!")	4:35
10.	"Rushmore, Lush, War" (from "Abe Lincoln Must Die!")	1:20
11.	"Good for Me (Good for You)" (from "Abe Lincoln Must Die!")	2:42
12.	"The War Room" (from "Abe Lincoln Must Die!")	3:04
13.	"Pounding Fathers" (from "Abe Lincoln Must Die!")	1:05
14.	"Computer Crisis" (from "Reality 2.0")	1:18
15.	"Useful to Boot" (from "Reality 2.0")	2:35
16.	"Sybil's 2.0" (from "Reality 2.0")	3:03
17.	"City Streets 2.0" (from "Reality 2.0")	3:06
18.	"Bosco's 2.0" (from "Reality 2.0")	2:03
19.	"Lefty's 2.0" (from "Reality 2.0")	1:12
20.	"Jimmy 2.0" (from "Reality 2.0")	0:30
21.	"The Office 2.0" (from "Reality 2.0")	1:39
22.	"Combat Begin!!" (from "Reality 2.0")	0:57
23.	"Crusin' 2.0" (from "Reality 2.0")	1:31
24.	"Cookin' the Books" (from "Reality 2.0")	0:24
25.	"404" (from "Reality 2.0")	1:01
26.	"Item Get" (from "Reality 2.0")	0:04
27.	"Roy G. Biv" (from "Reality 2.0")	1:22
28.	"Moonscape" (from "Bright Side of the Moon")	5:28
29.	"Prismatology Retreat" (from "Bright Side of the Moon")	5:02
30.	"Hugh's Inner Sanctum" (from "Bright Side of the Moon")	4:01
31.	"World of Max" (from "Bright Side of the Moon")	4:32
32.	"Good for You (Good for Me) Instrumental reprise" (from "Abe Lincoln Must Die")	1:30
Total length:		1:13:36

== Reception ==
Aggregate review scores
Game	GameRankings	Metacritic
Culture Shock	81%	81/100
Situation: Comedy	79%	79/100
The Mole, the Mob, and the Meatball	74%	74/100
Abe Lincoln Must Die!	81%	80/100
Reality 2.0	83%	82/100
Bright Side of the Moon	81%	79/100
Save the World PC version	88%	—
Save the World Wii version	75%	74/100
Save the World Xbox 360 version	78%	74/100
Save the World Remastered		(PC) 82/100 (NS) 75/100 (XONE) 84/100 (PS4) 80/100

Sam & Max Save the World received positive critical reaction from reviewers. Aggregate review scores on GameRankings and Metacritic rank the fifth episode, "Reality 2.0", as the critical favorite, while the third episode, "The Mole, the Mob, and the Meatball" received the lowest scores. The entire season holds a score of 88 percent on GameRankings. In addition to receiving several editor choice awards, the game has been recipient to publisher awards for the best adventure game of 2006. As Telltale Games had managed to release a steady stream content with only small time gaps, journalists in the video game industry had considered Sam & Max Save the World to be the first successful application of episodic gaming. Previous unsuccessful implementations of the distribution model included attempts by Valve with the Half-Life series, Ritual Entertainment with Sin Episodes: Emergence and Telltale themselves with Bone.

The debut episode, "Culture Shock", was recipient to a mostly optimistic response from critics. The episode was thought to adequately follow 1993's Sam & Max Hit the Road, with the introduction of the new 3D engine and gameplay being positively received. Criticisms of "Culture Shock" focused on the story; while the humor in the writing was praised, the plot was seen as a "thin excuse for the jokes" and the episode's primary antagonist was described by IGN's Steve Butts as "a bit of a letdown". The humorous writing and characters had done enough to compel the Academy of Interactive Arts & Sciences to nominate Culture Shock for "Outstanding Achievement in Story and Character Development" at the 10th Annual Interactive Achievement Awards. The second episode, "Situation: Comedy", was thought to produce a better antagonist than "Culture Shock", with the puzzles linking in well to the story. However, critics described the puzzles as too easy, and expressed disappointment at the reuse of lines from the first episode. The next episode, "The Mole, the Mob, and the Meatball", was the lowest rated episode amongst reviewers. Although the episode received compliments for its dialogue and humor, it was criticised for its easy puzzles and short length.

The fourth episode, "Abe Lincoln Must Die!", was held by critics to be one of the series' best episodes. The episode's story of political satire was subject to praise, whilst the increased length was also appreciated. Puzzles were felt to be more difficult and satisfying to solve. Detractors of the episode, however, felt that the episode suffered from the need to constantly move between locations and from the reuse of old characters and locations. "Reality 2.0", the fifth episode, was the critical favorite of the series. The game's puzzles were cited as stronger than in "Abe Lincoln Must Die!", with a fitting tribute to text adventure games towards the end. However, the script was thought to be inferior to the preceding episode. The season finale "Bright Side of the Moon" received a more reserved response than the two previous episodes, with criticisms directed at the length of the game and the depth of character interaction. Nevertheless, reviewers felt that the episode had reasonable puzzle design and that it was a respectable end to the series.

Critics gave positive reviews towards the overall gameplay mechanics, although they often presented some reservations. Several reviews praised the simplicity of the game interface. GamingTrend reviewer Ron Burke praised Telltale's "intuitive" point-and-click system. Mark Smith of Game Chronicles, however, stated that the streamlined mechanics eliminated "a lot of the exploration and discovery we normally associate with these types of games". Some reviews directed criticism towards puzzle design; according to Smith, the game is "certainly accessible to kids and younger teens", but the adult audience "will find these games way too easy". Reviewing for Adventure Gamers, Evan Dickens felt that the puzzles took "a bit of thought and consideration, but never to a point of consternation", believing that the low difficulty was intended by Telltale to allow players to "proceed through the story with minimum frustration". Hyper's Tim Henderson commends the game for being "highly accessible [and] almost as funny as the original", but criticises it for its episodic content being a "tease".

In relation to the story and writing, critics felt that the overall plot was ineffectual. Al Giovetti of JustAdventure felt the plot was lacking, while Burke considered the episodic nature to be detrimental to maintaining plot cohesion between the episodes, a point with which Dickens agreed. Despite this, several reviewers thought that the individual episode stories and the presentation and development of the characters were good. Reviewers considered the writing for each episode as one of the best features of the game; they also praised the level of humor in the game, although Dickens felt that it was not until the fourth episode that the writing properly established itself. In addition, they directed some skepticism towards the reuse of scenes and characters, with critical opinion divided on the degree of success in this regard. A point of contention rose between British and American reviewers over the story and setting, exemplified in PC Gamer; whilst positive towards the first and fourth episodes, the British edition of the magazine felt this repetition was a severe failing of Save the World, and that the writing did not work well. In contrast, the American edition rated each episode highly, stating that the quality of the series was "excellent".

Critics commended Sam & Max Save the World's graphics and art direction; Dickens commented that "the cartoonish, absurdist nature of Steve Purcell's characters is captured perfectly" within an "enthusiastically colorful world that is at its best the stranger it gets", while GameZone reviewer Anise Hollingshead praised Telltale for successfully upgrading the characters' graphics "without losing any of their cartoon appeal". Kristen Reed, writing for Eurogamer, felt that the graphics reflected a "great degree of care and attention to everything from the locations to the standard of character modelling and animation". They also praised the game for its sound, voice acting and music. In a review for The Entertainment Depot, Tim McGowan complimented Emerson-Johnson's soundtrack as "being quite excellent and listenable on its own", and IGN's Alex Van Zelfdendate described it as a "breath of fresh air". In contrast, PC Gamer UK's Alec Meer felt that the opening theme tune was "so busy trying to hint at [the theme for Sam & Max Hit the Road] that it forgets to have a memorable melody of its own". Nowlin and Kasten's voicework also received a positive response.

The Wii version of the game garnered a more reserved view from critics than the PC version; GameRankings and Metacritic gave aggregate review scores of 75 percent and 74 percent, respectively. For better or worse, reviewers felt that the game had not changed much from the PC version in terms of gameplay, story or overall content. While Sam & Max was thought to be a "perfect, naturally cartoony fit for the Wii", the critics noted a number of technical issues with the release. Several critics cited minor issues with using the imprecise Wii Remote for puzzles requiring accuracy, while observations were made that lines of dialogue could be cut short and that the frame rate could slow significantly, especially in action sequences.

== Remastered ==
Following the closure of Telltale Games in 2018, the rights to their Sam & Max games were acquired by Skunkape Games, a studio founded by Telltale co-founder Dan Connors and made up of original development team members Jake Rodkin, Jonathan Sgro, and Randy Tudor; the studio is named in reference to General Skun-ka'pe, a character from Sam & Max: The Devil's Playhouse. Skunkape retrieved the games' original assets and source code from Telltale's archives, intending to update them with a software patch to improve compatibility with newer PCs. However, the original material's age proved difficult to work with in many regards, leading to the decision to fully remaster Save the World instead. The team consulted with Purcell on the remaster, who contributed additional artwork. Several members of the original development team outside of Skunkape also contributed to the remastering effort, including locating original assets that could not be retrieved from Telltale's archives. The Remastered release runs on the most recent version of the Telltale Tool and features updated character models and lighting, controller support, and new music by original composer Jared Emerson-Johnson. Other changes made include updated cutscene cinematography and re-recorded dialogue for Bosco, with Ogie Banks replacing previous actor Joey Camen. Sam & Max Save the World Remastered was released on Nintendo Switch and Windows on December 2, 2020; on Xbox One on August 10, 2021; and on PlayStation 4 on September 29, 2022. The original Save the World episodes were later released as free downloadable content for the Steam version of Remastered in February 2021. Following Save the World, Skunkape began work on remasters for the other Telltale Sam & Max games, with Beyond Time and Space and The Devil's Playhouse released in December 2021 and August 2024 respectively.
