= Sam & Max: Freelance Police =

Unreleased video game

- Logo
- Developer: LucasArts
- Designer: Michael Stemmle
- Composer: Mark Griskey
- Series: Sam & Max
- Platform: Windows
- Release: Cancelled
- Genre: Graphic adventure
- Mode: Single-player

Sam & Max: Freelance Police was a graphic adventure video game developed by LucasArts from 2002 until its cancellation in 2004, and the final game in the company's adventure game era. Freelance Police was originally intended for release for Windows in early 2004 as a sequel to the 1993 title Sam & Max Hit the Road. The game was based on the characters Sam & Max: an anthropomorphic dog and a "hyperkinetic rabbity thing" who debuted in a 1987 comic book series created by Steve Purcell. Freelance Police was announced in August 2002, and showcased at the Electronic Entertainment Expo (E3) in 2003. Like its predecessor, Freelance Police was designed as a point-and-click adventure game, but used a 3D game engine in place of the SCUMM and GrimE engines used in older LucasArts adventure games. The project's development was led by Michael Stemmle, one of the original designers for Sam & Max Hit the Road, while Steve Purcell assisted in developing the game's plot and providing artistic direction.

Although the game's development appeared to be proceeding towards completion without difficulty, LucasArts abruptly canceled production of Freelance Police in March 2004, citing economic and market conditions. The game's cancellation, which was the second Sam & Max project cancelled after Plunge Through Space, was received poorly by fans of the series, Steve Purcell, and the video game industry media. Many journalists viewed this move as a culmination of the decline of the adventure game genre. LucasArts later terminated its adventure game development, and many of the Freelance Police design team left to create Telltale Games and continue development of such adventure games. Steve Purcell moved the Sam & Max franchise to Telltale Games in 2005, prompting a revival of Sam & Max video games.

== Overview ==
Freelance Police introduced 3D graphics to the franchise, but retained the point-and-click gameplay of its predecessor.

Sam & Max: Freelance Police was designed by LucasArts as a graphic adventure game and sequel to the 1993 title Sam & Max Hit the Road. The game was to feature 3D computer graphics rendered in real-time. The game engine contained elements from other LucasArts games, including those from Gladius, RTX Red Rock, Full Throttle: Hell on Wheels and Star Wars: Obi-Wan. Graphical features such as shaders, bump maps and lightmaps were used to give a 3D effect to 2D textures in the game. Little was revealed of the gameplay, other than that Freelance Police would not follow the same control scheme used in 3D LucasArts adventures Grim Fandango and Escape from Monkey Island, but would return to point-and-click mechanics used in the 2D LucasArts games. As in Sam & Max Hit the Road, Freelance Police would contain a mixture of optional and compulsory minigames, 19 in total. The game was designed so that the player character could not die or reach a dead end.

Few details were revealed about the game's plot. In a January 2004 interview, lead designer Michael Stemmle provided a rough outline: the game's story was "really six stories, loosely held together by a thrilling über-plot". Each individual story contained a separate case for the Freelance Police, taking place in a variety of environments, including a space station and a neopagan bacchanal, and featuring "freakish bad guys". Stemmle stated that the intention was to keep the "über-plot" concealed for a while, but noted that it contained "all the barely plausible grandeur that fans have come to expect from Sam and Max". Steve Purcell, the creator of Sam & Max, assisted in the development of both the plot and the artistic direction, producing concept art of various characters and locales. Besides the return of the title characters, only one other character, Flint Paper, was confirmed for the game. Described by Stemmle as "the Freelance Police's rough 'n' tumble private detective neighbour", Paper is briefly featured in Sam & Max comics and makes an offstage appearance in Sam & Max Hit the Road. Stemmle had Paper planned for a "critical role" in the game's plot.

Due to the nature of the story, LucasArts considered releasing the game in episodic fashion and using digital distribution, an option favored by the development team but opposed by the management division, who preferred the more traditional methods of retail distribution. Post-release bonus content was also considered; Stemmle remarked that such content would include new power-ups, minigames and "maybe even entirely new interactive Sam & Max cases [the player] can download".

== Development ==
The development of a sequel to Sam & Max Hit the Road was announced by LucasArts in August 2002. In their press release, LucasArts president Simon Jeffery stated that "the Sam & Max sequel, much like the recently announced Full Throttle II, perfectly complements LucasArts' renowned adventure game legacy and lends further support to the company's commitment to investing in and developing more of our original properties". LucasArts revealed no additional details at the time beyond a projected release in the first quarter of 2004. The game was officially announced for Windows at the Electronic Entertainment Expo convention in May 2003, where the full title Sam & Max: Freelance Police was revealed. LucasArts reaffirmed the projected early 2004 release date at the convention. The game's trailer was also presented at E3, reintroducing the characters and confirming that the original voice actors for Sam and Max, Bill Farmer and Nick Jameson respectively, were set to reprise their roles. Over the following months, several minor media releases were made, revealing new information regarding the game's developmental direction and graphical style. The game's release was highly anticipated by journalists in the video game industry, who published various previews and interviews with the development team, particularly with lead designer Michael Stemmle, one of the original designers of Sam & Max Hit the Road.

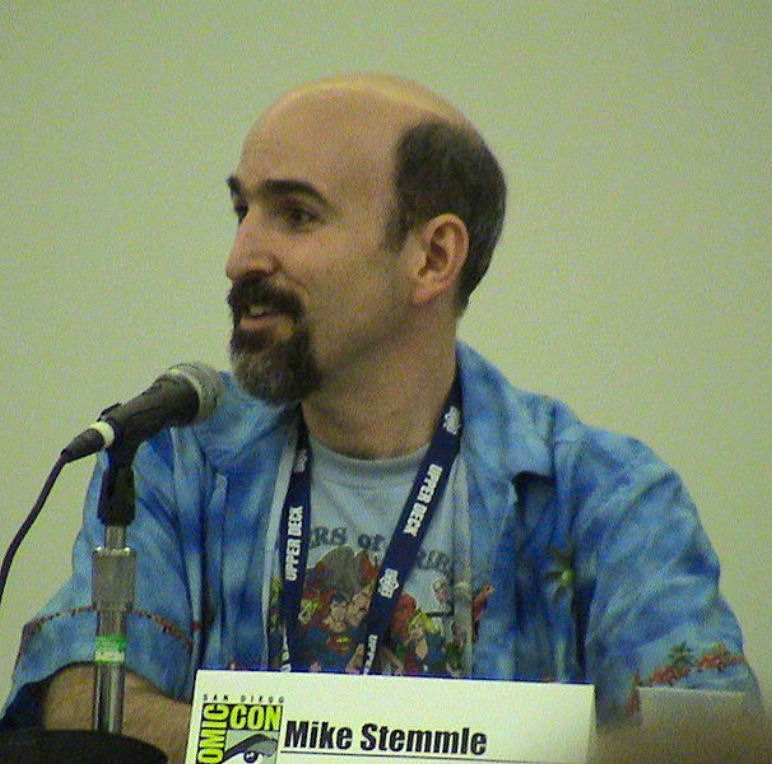
Project leader Michael Stemmle was one of the lead designers on Sam & Max Hit the Road.

In August 2003, LucasArts halted production on the Full Throttle adventure game sequel Hell on Wheels, leading the magazine Hyper to speculate that Freelance Police might suffer a similar fate. LucasArts reassured the media that Freelance Police was still in production and was nearing completion, reiterating that the game would be released in 2004. Media coverage continued; for example, PC Gamer US ran an interview with Stemmle as a cover story in February 2004. However, on March 3, LucasArts abruptly announced the cancellation of Freelance Police. In a short press release, LucasArts' Acting General Manager, Mike Nelson, stated that "after careful evaluation of current market place realities and underlying economic considerations, we've decided that this was not the appropriate time to launch a graphic adventure on the PC".

The reaction to the game's cancellation was overwhelmingly negative. Commentators in the industry media felt that the decision was representative of the diminishing relevance of adventure games, with many concluding that LucasArts was moving to maintain its position with low risk Star Wars-themed titles instead of the adventure games that had brought them success in earlier years. Freelance Police's cancellation is often cited as the culmination of the adventure genre's decline. The decision came so suddenly that some magazines accidentally published favorable previews of the game after LucasArts' announcement. A fan web site named "Save Sam and Max" presented a petition of 32,000 signatures to LucasArts conveying the fans' disappointment. Steve Purcell, the creator of the Sam & Max franchise, commented that he was disappointed by LucasArts' decision:

LucasArts' sudden decision to stop production on Sam & Max is mystifying. Sam & Max was on schedule and coming together beautifully. I couldn't have been more pleased with the quality of the writing, gameplay, hilarious animation and the gorgeous 3D world that Mike Stemmle's team has created. The rug has been pulled out from under this brilliant team who've so expertly retooled Sam & Max for the 21st century. I'm extremely frustrated and disappointed especially for the team who have devoted so much effort and creativity to Sam & Max. It's a shame to think that their accomplishments, as well as the goodwill that has been growing in the gaming press toward this project, will all go to waste due to this shortsighted decision.

— Steve Purcell

Farmer, the voice of Sam, revealed in a 2014 interview that he and Jameson were never told about the game's cancellation, and it was only when Farmer himself looked it up online that he found out. He expressed disappointment over the decision, claiming that Sam & Max Hit the Road had some of the best writing he had ever performed. According to Stemmle, the cancellation decision was prompted by the report of an external marketing analysis group hired by LucasArts, which claimed that the European market for adventure games "had simply disappeared. Not shrunk, not cratered, just... disappeared". A newly established German company, Bad Brain Entertainment, claimed to have entered negotiations with LucasArts to acquire the game, although nothing resulted from these talks. LucasArts subsequently dismissed many of the designers involved with developing their adventure games, and in 2006 stated that they did not intend to return to the adventure genre until the next decade. Some of the former Freelance Police development team formed Telltale Games in June 2004 to continue developing the sort of adventure games that LucasArts no longer wished to produce. Telltale Games later unsuccessfully attempted to buy the rights to Freelance Police from LucasArts, which would have enabled the team to finish developing the game. When the LucasArts license expired in mid-2005, Purcell took the franchise to Telltale Games, where it was developed into an episodic series of games. Very little of the work done on Freelance Police was carried over by the developers to Telltale Games; LucasArts still held on to the game's assets and Telltale was wary about using similar design patterns. The new series debuted in October 2006 with Sam & Max Save the World.

Although Freelance Police was never released, Stemmle later reused its plot summary in the Telltale's Poker Night 2, where it is described as an off-screen adventure Sam and Max have during the course of the game. Based on Sam's dialogue, the game would have involved dealing with giant penguins from the land of Subarctica (renamed "Zyzobia" in Poker Night 2) who worshipped Max as their god. Bill Farmer revealed in a 2014 interview that one of the game's plot points included Sam and Max switching brains, with him and Jameson likewise doing impressions of each other's character.
