= RTX Red Rock =

2003 video game

- Developer: LucasArts
- Publisher: LucasArts
- Platform: PlayStation 2
- Release: NA: June 17, 2003; EU: July 4, 2003
- Genre: Action-adventure
- Modes: Single-player, multiplayer

RTX Red Rock is a 2003 action-adventure game developed and published by LucasArts for the PlayStation 2. It was announced and later canceled for the GameCube.

== Plot ==
In the year 2113 aliens of unknown origin, known simply as LEDs (Light-Emitting Demons) launch an attack on Earth, resulting in heavy casualties on both sides. Earth comes out of the fighting victorious, but advanced US intelligence discovers that the LEDs have invaded Earth's colony on Mars. Believing that the LEDs intend to launch another attack on Earth, but unsure how to deal with the problem, the US army chief decides to send in an RTX (Radical Tactics Expert) to properly evaluate the situation.

This brings him to Major Wheeler. Wheeler undertakes the mission, despite his fear of Mars and goes off along with his robotic sidekick IRIS.

== Reception ==
Reception

Aggregate score
Aggregator	Score
Metacritic	49/100

Review scores
Publication	Score
AllGame	2/5
Electronic Gaming Monthly	3.17/10
Eurogamer	6/10
Game Informer	6.5/10
GamePro	2/5
GameRevolution	D+
GameSpot	4.9/10
GameSpy	1/5
GameZone	7.2/10
IGN	5.6/10
Official U.S. PlayStation Magazine	2/5

The game received "generally unfavorable reviews" according to the review aggregation website Metacritic.

GameSpot's Giancarlo Varanini thought that the game had a promising concept but the end result was disappointing: "It's just not a very fun game to play, and unless you're absolutely desperate for something to take up your time, it should probably be avoided." Kaiser Hwang of IGN found the game had "a lot of features and varied gameplay elements but fails to deliver where it counts." with "unfocused and bland" gameplay which made it hard to recommend. In a review for Eurogamer, Kristan Reed said "RTX tries hard to appeal to a broad audience, but feels so lacking in polish, you wonder how such a prestigious company could allow it to be released in such a state." He did concede, however, that if people could accept the game's limitations it was "actually a rather solid enjoyable, well paced adventure game."
