= Music4Games =

Former website

- Website type: Video Game Music
- Founded: 1999
- Dissolved: 2009
- Owners: Music4Games, Inc.
- Creator: Greg O'Connor-Read
- Website: music4games.net

Music4Games was a video game music information site originally launched in 1999. It focused on the video game soundtrack industry and claimed to target dedicated gamers, game music fans, audiophiles, students, composers, developers, publishers, producers, audio directors and music executives as a consumer and industry website. In December 2009, the website closed down without any prior announcement or reasons given.

== Details ==
Music4Games was a media partner for industry events and organizations including The Composer Expo, Develop Conference (Audio Track); MIDEM Music For Images Conference; Game Developers Conference; Game Audio Conference; The Game Audio Network Guild; GC Symphonic Game Music concert in Leipzig, Germany; Play! A Videogame Symphony concert series, Video Games Live (Official concert tour program), Mutek Festival, Arcadia Festival; media supporter for the British Academy of Film and Television Arts awards for best ‘Original Music’ and best ‘Sound’ in a video game.
