= Poker Night 2 =

2013 video game

- Developer: Telltale Games
- Publisher: Telltale Games
- Director: Nick Herman
- Producer: Adam Sarasohn
- Programmer: Tulley Rafferty
- Artist: Derek Sakai
- Writer: Michael Stemmle
- Composer: Jared Emerson-Johnson
- Engine: Telltale Tool
- Platforms: Microsoft Windows, Mac OS X, PlayStation 3, Xbox 360, iOS
- Release: Xbox Live Arcade; April 24, 2013; Steam (Windows & OS X); April 26, 2013; PlayStation Network: NA: April 30, 2013; PAL: May 1, 2013; iOS; May 23, 2013
- Genre: Card game
- Mode: Single-player

Poker Night 2 is a 2013 poker video game developed by Telltale Games. It is the sequel to Poker Night at the Inventory and, like its predecessor, features characters from different franchises. The game was released for Steam, PlayStation Network and Xbox Live Arcade in April 2013, with an iOS version released the following month. Due to expiring licenses, the game was pulled from sale in September 2018.

== Gameplay ==
Like the original game, Poker Night 2 is a computer-based poker simulation between an unseen silent participant (the player) and four characters that is played in The Inventory that was featured in the previous game. Each player starts with the same amount of virtual money (which was raised to $20,000 per player and $100,000 total from $10,000 per player and $50,000 total in the original game), and competes in standard poker rules to try to eliminate all the other players by exhausting their money. In addition to the Texas hold 'em style of play featured in the original game, Poker Night 2 introduced the Omaha hold 'em style as a playable mode as well. Like the original game, there is a large amount of dialogue due to the banter that the characters share.

The four featured characters in addition to the player are Sam from the Sam & Max franchise (voiced by David Nowlin), who is assisted by Max (voiced by David Boat), Brock Samson from The Venture Bros. (voiced by Patrick Warburton), Ash Williams from The Evil Dead franchise (voiced by Danny Webber), and Claptrap from the Borderlands series (voiced by David Eddings). GLaDOS (voiced by Ellen McLain) from the Portal series takes a supporting role as the dealer. During the hands, these characters provide humorous chatter between each other and towards the player. Reginald Van Winslow (voiced by Roger L. Jackson) from Tales of Monkey Island reprises his role as the host. Additional brief cameos include Steve the Bandit (voiced by Mikey Neumann) and Mad Moxxi from Borderlands, Doug and a Save-Lot Bandit from The Walking Dead, General Skun-ka'pe (Roger Jackson) from Sam & Max: The Devil's Playhouse, and a waiter from Gravity Bone.

There is a large amount of dialogue due to the banter that the characters share. The player, however, is silent (and this is acknowledged by the other characters in dialogue). The game features unlockable in-game card, chip and table designs, as well as "Bounty Unlocks" for completing certain goals, which unlock Borderlands 2 content and, depending on the platform played, Team Fortress 2 items on Steam, Xbox Avatar items, or PlayStation 3 themes. Simultaneously using chips, cards, and tables sharing the same theme alters the design of the Inventory, opening up new conversation possibilities. Players can also buy the other characters drinks from the Inventory's bar in order to more easily expose their tells.

== Development ==
Gameplay of Poker Night 2, showing the player with a royal flush, beating Sam (three of a kind), Brock (folded), and Claptrap (folded). Ash has busted out of the game on an earlier hand and can be seen at the bar in the background.

The first Poker Night game was developed by Telltale during a lull in their release schedule, and proved to be successful; Steve Allison, vice president of publishing at Telltale, believed it was the relationship between Telltale and Valve that contributed to the success of the game, luring players with Team Fortress 2 items for performing well in the game. As completion of The Walking Dead neared, Telltale found themselves in another lull, and returned to the Poker Night concept as a way to fill the gap.

Character selection was more direct than the first game, with Telltale wanting to bring in characters from movies and television. Allison had a good relationship with MGM Studios, who were eager to offer characters, and was able to secure the character of Ash from Evil Dead, which also was timed well against the release of the 2013 remake. Similarly, Allison stated that Cartoon Network readily agreed to the inclusion of Brock from Venture Bros., one of the Telltale team's first selections. Gearbox Software, the creators of Borderlands, appreciated the first game, and allowed the Claptrap character to be used. The final spot at the table was to be left open for a character from a Telltale game, eventually resulting in Sam. They had considered using either Marty McFly or Doc Brown from Back to the Future: The Game but realized that they would not be appropriate in a game with mature spoken content. Similarly, characters from The Walking Dead series would not be a thematic fit for the poker title, as it would make people emotional about the game. To help make the play more personable, they needed to have a dealer for the table, and GLaDOS was considered an obvious fit.

=== Marketing ===
Telltale started a website called The Key Party in 2013 in order to promote the game, with a new keychain related to the game characters revealed every working day from March 25 until April 1, when the game was officially revealed.

== Reception ==
Reception

Aggregate score
Aggregator	Score				
Aggregator	iOS	Macintosh	PC	PS3	Xbox 360
Metacritic	80/100	N/A	75/100	63/100	69/100

Review scores
Publication	Score				
Publication	iOS	Macintosh	PC	PS3	Xbox 360
Destructoid	N/A	N/A	8/10	N/A	N/A
Electronic Gaming Monthly	N/A	N/A	N/A	N/A	6/10
Game Informer	N/A	N/A	N/A	N/A	6/10
GameSpot	N/A	N/A	N/A	N/A	7/10
Gamezebo	N/A	4/5	4/5	N/A	N/A
GameZone	N/A	N/A	N/A	N/A	8.5/10
IGN	N/A	N/A	7.5/10	N/A	7.5/10
Jeuxvideo.com	15/20	16/20	16/20	N/A	N/A
MacLife	4/5	N/A	N/A	N/A	N/A
Official Xbox Magazine (US)	N/A	N/A	N/A	N/A	7/10
Play	N/A	N/A	N/A	55%	N/A
TouchArcade	2.5/5	N/A	N/A	N/A	N/A
411Mania	N/A	N/A	5.4/10	N/A	N/A
The Digital Fix	N/A	N/A	N/A	N/A	7/10

The PC and iOS versions received "generally favorable reviews", while the PlayStation 3 and Xbox 360 versions received "mixed or average reviews", according to the review aggregation website Metacritic.
