= Sam & Max: The Devil's Playhouse =

2010 point and click episodic video game

- Developer: Telltale Games (Note: Remastered version developed and published by Skunkape Games.)
- Publisher: Telltale Games
- Directors: David Bogan; Joe Pinney; Dennis Lenart; Jake Rodkin
- Producers: Franklin Alioto; Brett Tosti
- Designers: Chuck Jordan; Andy Hartzell; Joe Pinney; Mike Stemmle
- Programmers: Andrew Langley; Robert Oates; Randy Tudor
- Artists: Peter Tsaykel; Derek Sakai
- Writers: Chuck Jordan; Andy Hartzell; Joe Pinney; Mike Stemmle
- Composer: Jared Emerson-Johnson
- Series: Sam & Max
- Engine: Telltale Tool
- Platforms: Microsoft Windows; OS X; PlayStation 3; iPad; Nintendo Switch; PlayStation 4; Xbox One
- Release: iPad; April 1, 2010 (Note: The Penal Zone was the only episode released on the platform.); Windows, OS X, PS3; April 15, 2010 – August 30, 2010; Remastered; PS4, Switch, Xbox One, Windows; August 14, 2024
- Genre: Graphic adventure
- Mode: Single-player

Sam & Max: The Devil's Playhouse is a 2010 graphic adventure video game developed by Telltale Games. It is the fourth game based on the Sam & Max comic book series by Steve Purcell, (Note: Not including the cancelled releases of Sam & Max: Freelance Police and Sam & Max Plunge Through Space) and the third and final Sam & Max season developed by Telltale, following Save the World and Beyond Time and Space. Players control Sam and Max, self-styled vigilante detectives known as the Freelance Police, as they try to prevent groups of adversaries from stealing the latter's newly discovered psychic powers and taking over the world using them.

The game, like other Telltale games, was released episodically with five episodes releasing between April and August 2010. The first episode was ported to the iPad on April 1, 2010, before being released for Microsoft Windows, OS X, and the PlayStation 3 (the first Telltale game to appear on that platform) a couple weeks later. A remaster by Skunkape Games, the studio responsible for remastering previous games in the series, was released on August 14, 2024 for Windows, Nintendo Switch, PlayStation 4, and Xbox One.

== Gameplay ==
Gameplay under Max Mode, with two of his Toys of Power, Teleportation and Future Vision, already unlocked. This is the first game in the series to feature Max as a controllable character.

Sam & Max: The Devil's Playhouse is an episodic graphic adventure game, requiring the user to control Sam and Max to specific locations, interacting with the environment, collecting and using objects, and talking to other characters in the game in order to solve puzzles and complete the game. The previous two Sam & Max seasons used a traditional point-and-click interface, which is well-suited for Windows and MacOS users but did not translate well to traditional gamepad controls. The game engine for The Devil's Playhouse has been redesigned to handle both the point-and-click scheme and typical console-based controls for third-person perspective games. On a Windows or MacOS computer, the player has the option of plugging in a gamepad to use this second set of controls. Other aspects, such as inventory management, have also been refined to better suit console players or players not familiar with the adventure game genre. The iPad version of the game features direct touch interaction with the characters, scenery, and inventory.

Whereas in previous episodes Max would follow to wherever the player directed Sam, The Devil's Playhouse gives the player direct control over both characters and the ability to swap between characters. This allows for better differentiation between the two characters and increases the variety of gameplay options. A constant theme through the season is a suite of psychic powers that Max gains in each episode, such as the ability to read minds, see glimpses of the future, or teleport himself to any telephone for which he knows the number. This aspect plays into the separate characters' controls in order to solve the puzzles in the game. The PlayStation 3 version of the first episode features an additional psychic power not present in the other versions; this power was restored in the 2024 remaster.

== Synopsis ==
The game begins with a narrator, who explains to the audience that Sam and Max have discovered the "Toys of Power", seemingly harmless toys that grant Max various psychic abilities. They first use them to stop the alien General Skun-ka'pe, who has come to Earth seeking the Toys, and banish him back to the interdimensional prison known as the Penal Zone. During this mission, the Freelance Police encounter a Mole Man cult who have been watching over a mysterious artifact called the Devil's Toybox in the basement of Sam and Max's office. By watching some dusty film reels, they learn that their great-grandfathers, Sameth and Maximus, were chosen by the cryptic Mr. Papierwaite to retrieve the Toybox from the Tomb of Sammun-Mak, an ancient Pharaoh. However, when they successfully recovered it, Papierwaite attempted to use Maximus' psychic powers and the Toybox to summon the Elder God, Yog-Soggoth, and bring about the apocalypse. Sameth and Maximus managed to trick Mr. Papierwaite and stop the ritual, and then tasked the Mole Men with watching the Toybox while accidentally perishing due to a failed protection spell.

Just before the last reel, Sam goes to the bathroom and returns to find someone has stolen Max's brain and the Devil's Toybox. Sam tracks the thief to the Museum of Mostly Natural History, where he temporarily reanimates Max's body by putting Sammun-Mak's brain into Max's head. Together, they discover Skun-ka'pe has escaped the Penal Zone and is fighting the curator, the still-living Mr. Papierwaite, for possession of the Toybox and Max's brain. Sammun-Mak uses Max's body to activate the Toybox, creating an alternate reality where he rules over all, with Max's disembodied brain among the only ones to remember the previous reality. With help from the mole cultists and the mysterious Dr. Norrington, Max guides Sam into removing Sammun-Mak's brain, and reality is restored. Sam returns Max's brain to his body, but they find themselves surrounded by an army of Sam clones, who recover the Toybox.

Taking shelter in Stinky's Diner, Sam and Max uncover a cloning chamber where the "Clone Master" is using the clones to gather the remaining toys of power. They encounter Mr. Papierwaite and Dr. Norrington, revealed to be the elder god Yog-Soggoth. The two explain that they were fused together when Sameth and Maximus disrupted Papierwaite's ritual, and that they have been trying to destroy the Devil's Toybox to prevent its use in a ritual to summon Yog-Soggoth's grandson, Junior, which would destroy reality. After discovering Momma Bosco was paid to build the cloning machines and restoring her to life, Sam and Max follow the clones to the Toybox. Before they can recover it, they are stopped by Charlie Ho-Tep, one of the Toys of Power, who reveals himself as the Clone Master. Sam and Max are captured and taken to the Statue of Liberty, where Charlie Ho-Tep plans to complete the ritual in hopes that Junior will play with him. With Yog-Soggoth and Papierwaite's help, Max unleashes his psychic powers and tricks Charlie into destroying the Toybox and himself. However, Max accidentally swallows some of Junior's demonic essence, turning him into a giant eldritch beast.

Sam forms a strike team, alongside Sybil Pandemik, Yog-Soggoth and Papierwaite, to enter Max's body and reverse the changes. Inside, Sam takes control of Max's body and meets the narrator, revealed to be Max's Superego, who plans to blow up Max's brain and the city due to Max's crude instincts and lack of morals. While Girl Stinky and Skun-ka'pe form an evil alliance, Sam attempts to stop the Superego, but is disrupted when Sybil goes into labor. Max's subconscious suddenly shows a desire to save Sybil, and the Superego realizes he has been wrong and decides to make amends, telling Sam and the others to escape. Unable to stop the explosion, the Superego teleports Max to Skun-ka'pe's ship, with Skun-ka'pe, Girl Stinky, and Max perishing in the blast. Despite Momma Bosco's best efforts, they cannot clone Max and Sam walks off alone. At the last moment, he is greeted by the parallel universe Max (Note: Introduced in the previous season, Sam & Max Beyond Time and Space) whose Sam was destroyed under similar circumstances, and the two head off on another adventure.

== Episodes ==
Episode	Designer/Writer	Director	Release date
"The Penal Zone"	Chuck Jordan	Chuck Jordan	April 1, 2010 (iPad) / April 15, 2010 (April 16, 2010 on Steam)
General Skun-ka'pe, a gorilla from outer space, arrives in town bringing a message of peace and love. However, Sam and Max find out about his true intentions thanks to Max's new psychic power to see the future before his arrival. Now these two must stop him.
"The Tomb of Sammun-Mak"	Andy Hartzell	Dave Bogan	May 18, 2010 (May 20, 2010 on Steam)
Using a strange projector found in the basement of their building Sam and Max view the last adventure of their great-grandfathers, Sameth and Maximus, as they become selected to find the devil's toybox, steal it, survive the train robbery then return the box.
"They Stole Max's Brain!"	Joe Pinney; Mike Stemmle	Joe Pinney; Mike Stemmle; Nick Herman	June 22, 2010 (June 24, 2010 on Steam)
Max's brain was stolen during Sam's bathroom break in the last episode! Now Sam must figure out who stole Max's brain, with Skun-ka'pe being the primary suspect.
"Beyond the Alley of the Dolls"	Mike Stemmle; Joe Pinney	Dennis Lenart	July 20, 2010 (July 21, 2010 on Steam)
Clones of Sam are searching the city for the Toys of Power. Sam and Max must locate the source of these clones and stop whoever is responsible.
"The City That Dares Not Sleep"	Chuck Jordan	Jake Rodkin	August 30, 2010 (August 31 on PSN)
Max is transformed into a giant demonic beast and begins terrorizing New York. It's up to Sam and a small team of adventurers to journey inside Max and return him back to his normal size before he and the city are destroyed.

== Development and release ==
The Devil's Playhouse was the third Sam & Max game produced by Telltale Games since acquiring the license after the cancellation of Sam & Max: Freelance Police in 2004. The game was initially expected to be released in 2009, a year after Sam & Max Beyond Time and Space. Though the game failed to materialize, towards the end of 2009 Telltale alluded to the Sam & Max sequel in the final chapter of Tales of Monkey Island, directing players to the game's preliminary website. Industry media later noted that the title Sam & Max: The Devil's Playhouse as well as the title of the first episode, "The Penal Zone", had been registered with the OFLC, the Australian film and video game classification body. Telltale officially announced The Devil's Playhouse at the Game Developers Conference in March 2010, for release for Windows, the PlayStation Network and Mac OS.

While The Devil's Playhouse was originally announced for PC and the PlayStation 3 for release on April 15, an iPad version of the game became available on April 2, as one of the first applications for the release of the device. Telltale's CEO, Dan Connors, revealed that they chose to develop the series for the iPad as a new opportunity as it "really revolutionizes the way our stuff is played". Connors also stated that once they started testing the iPad version, they felt the device helped to give more immersion to the game, as opposed to the other platforms where they play out more as an interaction movie. Telltale was able to keep most of the features that they had already developed for the PC and console releases, including 3D graphics limited only by the shader technology on the iPad, while including features that took advantage of the iPad's technology, such as a touch-based interface.

A remaster by Skunkape Games was released on August 14, 2024 for Windows, Nintendo Switch, PlayStation 4, and Xbox One. Like Skunkape's remasters of the previous two Sam & Max games, the remastered version features updated character models and lighting, and new cinematography, environment design, and music. The remastered version also includes the "Nutri-Specs", an additional power for Max that was previously exclusive to the PlayStation 3 release of "The Penal Zone".

=== Promotional giveaway ===
In April 2010, game developer Valve announced that anyone who purchased The Devil's Playhouse through Steam would receive three bonus items in Team Fortress 2: a hat based on Max's head, Max's pistol, and Sam's revolver. The promotion ended on April 26. This was later expanded to include people who purchased the games through the Telltale store.
