= Psychonauts =

2005 video game

- Developer: Double Fine Productions (Note: Budcat Creations helped with the PlayStation 2 port.)
- Publisher: Majesco (Note: The Windows (Steam), Mac OS X and Linux ports are self published by Double Fine Productions, along with the PS2 version on PS2 classics for PS3 and as a classic title for PS4. The Windows (Xbox Live) and the Original Xbox ports on Xbox Live Marketplace are published by Microsoft Studios.)
- Director: Tim Schafer
- Designer: Erik Robson
- Programmers: David Dixon; Kee Chi; Anna Kipnis; Brad Muir
- Artists: Scott Campbell; Peter Chan; Nathan Stapley; Guarav Mathur
- Writers: Tim Schafer; Erik Wolpaw
- Composer: Peter McConnell
- Platforms: Windows; Xbox; PlayStation 2; Mac OS X; Linux
- Release: April 19, 2005: Windows, Xbox; NA: April 19, 2005; EU: February 10, 2006; PlayStation 2; NA: June 21, 2005; EU: February 10, 2006; Mac OS X; WW: September 29, 2011; Linux; WW: May 31, 2012
- Genres: Platform, action-adventure
- Mode: Single-player

Psychonauts is a 2005 platform game developed by Double Fine Productions and published by Majesco for Microsoft Windows, Xbox, and PlayStation 2. The game follows Razputin "Raz" Aquato, a young boy gifted with psychic abilities, who runs away from a circus to try to sneak into a summer camp for those with similar powers to become a "Psychonaut", a spy with psychic abilities. He finds that there is a sinister plot occurring at the camp that only he can stop. The game is centered on exploring the strange and imaginative minds of various characters that Raz encounters as a Psychonaut-in-training/"Psycadet" to help them overcome their fears or memories of their past, so as to gain their help and progress in the game. Raz gains use of several psychic abilities during the game that are used for both attacking foes and solving puzzles.

Psychonauts was based on an abandoned concept that Double Fine founder Tim Schafer had during his previous development of Full Throttle. The game was initially backed by Microsoft's Ed Fries as a premiere title for the original Xbox console, but several internal and external issues led to difficulties for Double Fine in meeting various milestones and responding to testing feedback. Following Fries' departure in 2004, Microsoft dropped the publishing rights, making the game's future unclear. Double Fine was able to secure Majesco as a publisher a few months later allowing them to complete the game after four and a half years of development.

The game was well received, but publisher Majesco encountered a severe financial loss after the game's release and departed from the video game market. Psychonauts has earned a number of industry awards and gained a cult following. It has since been cited as one of the greatest video games ever made. In 2011, Double Fine acquired the rights for the title, allowing the company to republish the title through digital distribution with updates for modern gaming systems and ports for Mac OS X and Linux. Double Fine reported that their own sales of the game have far exceeded what was initially sold on its original release, with cumulative sales of nearly 1.7 million as of December 2015. A sequel, Psychonauts 2, was announced at The Game Awards in December 2015 and was released on August 25, 2021.

== Gameplay ==
Psychonauts is a platform game that incorporates various adventure elements. The player controls the main character Raz in a third-person, three-dimensional view, helping Raz to uncover a mystery at the Psychonauts training camp. Raz begins with basic movement abilities such as running and jumping, but as the game progresses, Razputin gains additional psychic powers such as telekinesis, levitation, invisibility, and pyrokinesis. These abilities allow the player to explore more of the camp as well as fight off enemies. These powers can be awarded either by completing certain story missions, gaining PSI ranks during the game, or purchasing them with hidden arrowheads scattered around the camp. Powers can be improved — such as more damaging pyrokinesis or longer periods of invisibility — through gaining additional PSI ranks. The player can assign three of these powers to their controller or keyboard for quick use, but all earned powers are available at any time through a selection screen.

The game includes both the "real world" of the camp and its surroundings, as well as a number of "mental worlds" which exist in the consciousness of the game's various characters. The mental worlds have wildly differing art and level design aesthetics, but generally have a specific goal that Raz must complete to help resolve a psychological issue a character may have, allowing the game's plot to progress. Within the mental worlds are censors that react negatively to Raz's presence, and attack him. There are also various collectibles within the mental worlds, including "figments" of the character's imagination which help increase Razputin's PSI ranking, "emotional baggage" which can be sorted by finding tags and bringing them to the baggage, and "memory vaults" which can unlock a short series of slides providing extra information on that character's backstory. Most of these worlds culminate in a boss battle that fully resolves the character's emotional distress and advance the story. The player is able to revisit any of these worlds after completing them to locate any additional collectibles they may have missed. Razputin is given some items early in the game, one that allows him to leave any mental world at any time, and another that can provide hints about what to do next or how to defeat certain enemies.

Raz can take damage from psychically empowered creatures around the camp at night, or by censors in the mental worlds; due to a curse placed on his family, Raz is also vulnerable to water. If Raz's health is drained, he is respawned at the most-recent checkpoint. However, this can only be done so many times while Raz is within a mental world, indicated by the number of remaining astral projections; if these are expended through respawning, Raz is ejected from the character's mind and must re-enter to make another attempt. Health and additional projections can be collected throughout the levels, or purchased at the camp store.

== Plot ==
=== Setting ===
The story is set in the fictional Whispering Rock Psychic Summer Camp, a remote US government training facility under the guise of a children's summer camp. Centuries ago, the area was hit by a meteor made of Psitanium (a fictional mineral that can grant psychic powers or strengthen existing powers), creating a huge crater. The Psitanium affected the local wildlife, giving them limited psychic powers, such as bears with the ability to attack with telekinetic claws, cougars with pyrokinesis, and rats with confusion gas. The Native Americans of the area called Psitanium "whispering rock", which they used to build arrowheads.

When settlers began inhabiting the region, the psychoactive properties of the meteor slowly drove them insane. An asylum named Thorny Towers Home of the Disturbed was built to house the afflicted, but within fifteen years, the asylum had more residents than the town did and the founder Houston Thorny committed suicide by throwing himself from the asylum's tower. The government relocated the remaining inhabitants and flooded the crater to prevent further settlement, creating what is now Lake Oblongata. The asylum still stands, but has fallen into disrepair.

The government took advantage of the Psitanium deposit to set up a training camp for Psychonauts, a group of agents gifted with psychic abilities used to help defeat evil-doers. The training ground is disguised as a summer camp for young children, but in reality helps the children to hone their abilities and to train them to be Psychonauts themselves. Due to this, only those recruited by the Psychonauts are allowed into the camp.

=== Characters ===
Group photo of Whispering Rock campers and Ford Cruller

The protagonist and playable character of the game is Razputin "Raz" Aquato (voice actor Richard Horvitz), the son of a family of circus performers, who runs away from the circus to become a Psychonaut, despite his father Augustus' wishes. His family is cursed to die in water, and a watery hand called the Hand of Galochio attempts to submerge Raz whenever he approaches any significantly deep water.

When at camp, Raz meets four of the Psychonauts that run the camp: the cool and calculating Sasha Nein (voice actor Stephen Stanton), the fun-loving Milla Vodello (voice actress Alexis Lezin), the regimental Agent/Coach Morceau Oleander (voice actor Nick Jameson), and the aged, Mark Twainesque Ford Cruller (voice actor David Kaye), said by Razputin to have been the greatest leader the Psychonauts ever had, until a past psychic duel shattered Ford's psyche and left him with dissociative identity disorder. Only when he is near the large concentration of Psitanium does his psyche come together enough to form his real personality, though he does appear throughout the camp in various roles (shopkeeper, boathouse manager, park ranger).

During his time at camp, Raz meets several of the other gifted children including Lili Zanotto (voice actress Nicki Rapp), the daughter of the Grand Head of the Psychonauts, who falls in love with him at first sight (which he eventually reciprocates); and Dogen Boole (voice actress Nika Futterman), the grandson of one of the Psychonaut's founders who can communicate with animals and goes around with a tin foil hat to prevent his abilities from causing anyone's head to explode.

Raz also meets the residents of the insane asylum including ex-dentist and brain surgeon Dr. Caligosto Loboto; as well as Boyd Cooper, a former security guard that holds a number of government conspiracy theories about a person known as "the Milkman"; Fred Bonaparte, an asylum orderly struggling control over his mind by a hallucination of his ancestor, Napoleon Bonaparte; Gloria Van Gouton, a former actress driven insane by a family tragedy; Edgar Teglee, a painter whose girlfriend cheated on him, leading him to have an obsession with bullfights; and Linda, the gigantic lungfish that, due to Oleander and Loboto's experiments on it (which included a mind-control chip in its brain) brings campers to the asylum.

=== Story ===
Razputin, having fled from his family's circus, tries to sneak into the camp, but is caught by the Psychonauts. They agree to let him stay until his parents arrive, but refuse to let him take part in any activities. However, they do allow him to take part in Morceau's "Basic Braining" course, which he easily passes. Impressed, Sasha invites Raz to take part in an experiment to determine the extent of his abilities.

During the experiment, Raz comes across a vision of Dr. Loboto, an insane ex-dentist, extracting Dogen's brain, but is unable to intervene. Raz eventually realizes that the vision is true after finding Dogen without his brain, but the Psychonauts refuse to believe him.

After receiving additional training from Milla, Raz learns that Dr. Loboto is working on behalf of Morceau, who intends to harvest the campers' brains to power an army of psychic death tanks. Lili is soon abducted as well, and with both Sasha and Milla missing, Raz takes it upon himself to infiltrate the abandoned Thorny Towers Home of the Disturbed insane asylum where she was taken. Ford gives him a piece of bacon which he can use to contact him at any time, and tasks him with retrieving the stolen brains so that he can return them to the campers.

Raz frees the mutated lungfish Linda from Morceau's control, and she takes him safely across the lake. At the asylum, Raz helps the inmates overcome their illnesses, and they help him access the upper levels of the asylum, where Loboto has set up his lab. He frees Lili and restores Sasha and Milla's minds, allowing them to confront Morceau. The inmates subsequently burn down the asylum, allowing Morceau to transfer his brain to a giant tank. Raz defeats him, but when he approaches the tank, it releases a cloud of sneezing powder, causing him to sneeze his brain out.

Raz uses his telekinesis to place his brain inside the tank, merging it with Morceau's. Inside, Raz discovers that Morceau's evil springs from his childhood fear of his father, who ran a butcher shop. At the same time, Raz's own father appears and the two fathers join forces. However, he turns out to be an imposter, with Raz's real father, Augustus, appearing and using his own psychic abilities to fix his son's tangled mind and beat the personal demons. At the camp's closing ceremony, Ford presents him with a uniform and welcomes him into the Psychonauts. Raz prepares to leave camp with his father, but word arrives that the Grand Head of the Psychonauts—Lili's father, Truman Zanotto—has been captured. Thus Raz and the Psychonauts fly off on their new mission.

== Development ==
Psychonauts was the debut title for Double Fine Productions, a development studio that Tim Schafer founded after leaving LucasArts, following their decision to exit the point-and-click adventure game market. Schafer's initial studio hires included several others that worked alongside him on Grim Fandango (1998). Super Mario 64 (1996) had introduced him to direct player character movement in a 3D space, along with Final Fantasy VII (1997) and The Legend of Zelda: The Ocarina of Time (1998), which also prominently featured storytelling and puzzle-solving, like Schafer's previous works. He said, "I think that was the moment where I was like, 'I don't think I want to make a point-and-click adventure anymore. I think I want to make a console game. I want to make a character-driven console game that is just really immediate and has more action, but, you know, still has a lot of narrative.'"

The conception of Psychonauts can be traced as far back as during the development of Full Throttle, where Schafer envisioned a sequence in which the protagonist Ben goes under a peyote-induced psychedelic experience. This was eventually ejected from the game for not being family-friendly enough, though Schafer still held a fascination with products of the subconscious, feeling that one could "understand your mind better" through dreams rather than thinking consciously. In his later years at LucasArts, Schafer pitched a "spy game" featuring martial arts and meditation, in which the player character would solve puzzles by embarking on vision quests through their mind. One of Schafer's co-workers misinterpreted his pitch, believing that the player would go into other peoples' minds, and Schafer realized that he preferred this idea.

Other influences include the film Dreamscape (1984), in which the main character can enter into other peoples' dreams, and in a child's dream, his father is portrayed in an exaggeratedly negative manner, as is Razputin's father in Psychonauts; the Haruki Murakami novel Hard-Boiled Wonderland and the End of the World (1985), which inspired the concept of visiting dream-like constructs inside a character's head; the Jet Li films The New Legend of Shaolin (1994) and My Father Is a Hero (1995), in which the main character is accompanied by a child who is abnormally determined and mature for his age, much like Raz; The Fly II (1989), where a group of children with psychic abilities are held in a research facility and experimented on (this evolved into the idea of Psychonauts taking place at a summer camp); The Nightmare Before Christmas (1993), as the team was inspired by the visuals of the scene where Jack Skellington confronts Oogie Boogie when creating the level "Black Velvetopia", as well at the film's overall craftsmanship, and initially desired to recreate the stop-motion style, though they were limited by a lack of technical expertise; the work of artist Joe Sorren, who was drawn from heavily when designing the characters, with their unconventional proportions and color schemes; the video game Skies of Arcadia (2000), which features collectibles that are hidden underground and make the player's controller vibrate when they stand over them, much like the arrowheads in Psychonauts; both The Suffering (2004) and the work of artists Jean-Michel Basquiat and Paul Klee inspired the idea for figments according to different members of the team.

While still working at LucasArts, Schafer decided to use the name "Raz" for the main character because he liked the nickname of the LucasArts animator, Razmig "Raz" Mavlian. When Mavlian joined Double Fine, there was increased confusion between the character and the animator. The game's associate producer, Camilla Fossen, suggested the name "Rasputin". As a compromise, Double Fine's lawyer suggested the trademarkable name "Razputin", which was used for the game.

Most of the game's dialog and script was written by Schafer and Erik Wolpaw, who at the time was a columnist for the website Old Man Murray. After establishing the game's main characters, Schafer undertook his own exercise to write out how the characters would see themselves and the other characters' on a social media site similar to Friendster, which Schafer was a fan of at the time and from where he met his wife-to-be.

This helped him to solidify the characters in his own head prior to writing the game's dialog, as well as providing a means of introducing the characters to the rest of the development team. To help flesh out character dialog outside of cutscenes, Schafer developed an approach that used dozens of spoken lines by a character that could be stitched together in a random manner by the game as to reduce apparent repetition; such stitching included elements like vocal pauses and coughs that made the dialog sound more natural. Schafer used the camp and woods setting as a natural place that children would want to wander and explore.

"The Milkman Conspiracy" level, where a 1950s suburban setting is presented in a twisted reality based on the mind of a conspiracy theorist, is one of Psychonauts's most famous levels.

The game's mental worlds were generally a result of an idea presented by Schafer to the team, fleshed out through concept art and gameplay concepts around the idea, and then executed into the game with the asset and gameplay developers, so each world had its own unique identity. One of the game's most famous levels is "The Milkman Conspiracy", which takes place in the mind of Boyd, one of the patients at the mental hospital who is obsessed with conspiracy theories. Schafer had been interested in knowing what went on inside the minds of those that believed in conspiracy theories, inspired by watching Capricorn One as a child.

During a Double Fine dinner event, someone had uttered the line "I am the milkman, my milk is delicious.", which led Schafer to create the idea of Boyd, a milkman bent on conspiracy theories. Schafer then worked out a web of conspiracy theories, wanting the level to be a maze-like structure around those, tying that in to Boyd's backstory as a person who had been fired from many different jobs, partially inspired by a homeless person that Double Fine occasionally paid to help clean their office front. Schaefer had wanted the 1950s suburban vibe to the level as it would fit in with the spy theme from the same period. Artist Scott Campbell fleshed out these ideas, along with the featureless G-men modeled after the Spy vs. Spy characters.

Peter Chan came up with the idea of vaulting the suburban setting into vertical spaces as to create a maze-like effect, which inspired the level designers and gameplay developers to create a level where the local gravity would change for Raz, thus allowing him to move across the warped setting that was created. The level's unique gameplay aspect, where Raz would need to give specific G-men a proper object as in point-and-click adventure games, was from gameplay developer Erik Robson as a means to take advantage of the inventory feature that they had given Raz. Schafer had wanted Wolpaw to write the lines for the G-men, but as he was too busy, Schafer ended up writing these himself.

The art design crew included background artist Peter Chan and cartoonist Scott Campbell. Voice actor Richard Steven Horvitz, best known for his portrayal of Zim in the cult favorite animated series Invader Zim, provides the voice of Raz, the game's protagonist. Initially the team tried to bring in children to provide the voices for the main cast, similar to Peanuts cartoons, but struggled with their lack of acting experience.

Schafer had selected Horvitz based on his audition tapes and ability to provide a wide range of vocal intonations on the spot, providing them with numerous takes to work with. Raz was originally conceived as an ostrich suffering from mental imbalance and multiple personalities. Tim Schafer killed the idea because he strongly believes in games being "wish fulfillments," guessing that not many people fantasize about being an insane ostrich.

Double Fine created a number of internal tools and processes to help with the development of the game, as outlined by executive producer Caroline Esmurdoc. With the focus of the game on Raz as the playable character within a platform game, the team created the "Raz Action Status Meeting" (RASM). These were held bi-weekly with each meeting focusing on one specific movement or action that Raz had, reviewing how the character controlled and the visual feedback from that so that the overall combination of moves felt appropriate. With extensive use of the Lua scripting language, they created their own internal Lua Debugger nicknamed Dougie, after a homeless man near their offices they had befriended, that helped to normalize their debugging processes and enable third-party tools to interact with the game.

With a large number of planned cutscenes, Double Fine took the time to create a cutscene editor so that the scriptwriters could work directly with the models and environments already created by the programmers without requiring the programmer's direct participation. For level design, though they had initially relied on the idea of simply placing various triggers throughout a level to create an event, the resulting Lua code was large and bulky with potential for future error.

They assigned eight of the game programmers to assist the level developers to trim this code, and instituted an internal testing department to overlook the stability of the whole game which had grown beyond what they could do internally. Initially this was formed from unpaid volunteers they solicited on Double Fine's web site, but following the signing of the Majesco publication deal in 2004, they were able to commit full-time staff to this team.

=== Production and publishing difficulties ===
Esmurdoc described the development of Psychonauts as difficult due to various setbacks, compounded by the new studio's lack of experience in how to manage those setbacks. The game's initial development began in 2001 during the dot-com boom. Due to the cost of office space at that time, Double Fine had established an office in an inexpensive warehouse in San Francisco that initially fit their development needs.

By 2003, they had come to realize the area they were in was not safe or readily accommodating, slowing down their development. With the collapse of the dot-com bubble, they were able to secure better office space, though this further delayed production. Schafer was also handling many of the duties for both the studio and the development of the game. Though some of the routine business tasks were offloaded to other studio heads, Schafer brought Esmurdoc onto the project in 2004 to help produce the game while he could focus on the creative side.

The intent to allow all developers to have artistic freedom with the game created some internal strife in the team, particularly in the level design; they had initially scoped that level designers would create the basic parts of a level - main paths, scripted events, and the level's general design, while the artists would build out the world from that. As development progressed, they determined that the artists should be the ones constructing the level geometry, which the level designers resented.

Subsequently, levels that were generated were not to the expected standards due to conflicts in the toolsets they used and Schafer's inability to oversee the process while handling the other duties of the studio. In 2003, the decision was made to dismiss all but one of the level design team, and unify the level design and art into a World Building team overseen by Erik Robson, the remaining level designer and who would go on to become the game's lead designer; the change, which Esmurdoc stated was for the better, disrupted the other departments at Double Fine.

Psychonauts was to be published by Microsoft for release exclusively on their Xbox console; Schafer attributes this to Microsoft's Ed Fries, who at the time of Psychonauts's initial development in 2001, was looking to develop a portfolio of games for the new console system. Schafer believes that Fries was a proponent of "pushing games as art", which helped to solidify Double Fine's concept of Psychonauts as an appropriate title for the console after the team's collected experience of developing for personal computers.

However, according to Esmurdoc, Microsoft had also created some milestones that were unclear or difficult to meet, which delayed the development process. She also believes that their own lack of a clear vision of the ultimate product made it difficult to solidify a development and release schedule for the game as well as created confusion with the publisher. Schafer stated that Microsoft also found some of their gameplay decisions to be confusing based on play-testing and requested them to include more instructional information, a common approach for games during the early 2000s, while Schafer and his team felt such confusion was simply the nature of the adventure-based platform that they were developing.

Double Fine was also resistant to make changes that Microsoft had suggested from play-testing, such as making the humor secondary to the story, removing the summer camp theme, and drastically altering the story. Fries departed Microsoft in January 2004; shortly thereafter, the company soon pulled the publishing deal for Psychonauts.

Esmurdoc said that Microsoft's management considered Double Fine to be "expensive and late", which she agreed had been true but did not reflect on the progress they had been making at this point. Schafer also noted that at the time of Microsoft's cancellation that they were planning on transitioning to the Xbox 360 and were not funding any further development of games that would not be released after 2004; even though Schafer had set an approximate release date in the first quarter of 2005 by this point, Microsoft still opted to cancel.

Following this, Schafer and Esmurdoc worked to secure a new publishing deal while using internal funds and careful management to keep the project going. One source of funds that helped keep the company operational came from Will Wright, who had recently sold his company Maxis to Electronic Arts. Prevented from investing into Double Fine by the Maxis deal, he instead provided Double Fine a loan of funds that kept them afloat over the next several months. Wright is credited for this support within the game.

By August 2004, Double Fine had negotiated a new publishing deal with Majesco to release the game on Windows as well as the Xbox. Tim Schafer was quoted as saying "Together we are going to make what could conservatively be called the greatest game of all time ever, and I think that's awesome."

Though the publishing deal ensured they would be able to continue the development, Esmurdoc stated they had to forgo plans for hiring new developers to meet the scope of the game as agreed to with Majesco. Subsequently, the studio entered, as described by Esmurdoc, "the most insane crunch I have ever witnessed" in order to complete the game. This was compounded when Majesco announced a PlayStation 2 port to be developed by Budcat Creations in October 2004, which further stretched the availability of Double Fine's staff resources. The game went gold in March 2005; Esmurdoc attributes much of the success of this on the solidarity of the development team that kept working towards this point.

Esmurdoc stated that Psychonauts took about 4.5 years to complete — though that without all the complications the real development time was closer to 2 years — with a team of 42 full-time developers and additional contractors, with a final budget of $11.5 million.

=== Music ===
The soundtrack to Psychonauts was composed by Peter McConnell, known for his work on LucasArts titles such as Grim Fandango and Day of the Tentacle. Schafer's familiarity with McConnell, having worked with him on numerous projects in the past, led Schafer to select him for the soundtrack composition. The Psychonauts Original Soundtrack, featuring all the in-game music, was released in 2005. The following year, in late 2006, Double Fine released a second soundtrack, Psychonauts Original Cinematic Score, containing music from the game's cutscenes as well as a remix of the main theme and credits.

== Release ==
The final U.S. release date for the game on Xbox and Windows was April 19, 2005, with the PlayStation 2 port following on June 21, 2005. Psychonauts was re-released via Valve's Steam digital distribution platform on October 11, 2006. Although initially unplayable on the Xbox 360, Tim Schafer spearheaded a successful e-mail campaign by fans which led to Psychonauts being added to the Xbox 360 backwards compatible list on December 12, 2006, and on December 4, 2007, Microsoft made Psychonauts one of the initial launch titles made available for direct download on the Xbox 360 through their Xbox Originals program.

=== Acquisition of rights and republishing ===
In June 2011, the original publishing deal with Majesco expired, and full publication rights for the game reverted to Double Fine. When Majesco's rights expired, the game was temporarily removed from the service in August 2011, as Microsoft does not allow unpublished content on its Xbox Live Marketplace. Schafer worked with Microsoft to gain their help in publishing the title under the Microsoft Studios name, and the game returned to the Marketplace in February 2012.

In September 2011, Double Fine released an updated version for Microsoft Windows and a port to Mac OS X and Linux through Steam. The new version provided support for Steam features including achievements and cloud saving. The Mac OS X port was developed in partnership with Steven Dengler's Dracogen. In conjunction with this release, an iOS application, Psychonauts Vault Viewer!, was released at the same time, featuring the memory vaults from the game with commentary by Tim Schafer and Scott Campbell. The game was added to the PlayStation Network store as a "PS2 Classic" for the PlayStation 3 in August 2012. As part of a deal with Nordic Games, who gained the rights to Costume Quest and Stacking after THQ's bankruptcy, Double Fine took over publishing rights for both games, while Nordic published and distribute retail copies of all three games for Windows and Mac OS X systems. Double Fine offered Psychonauts as part of a Humble Bundle in June 2012. In 2016, Double Fine also released Psychonauts as a classic title for use with the PlayStation 4's emulation software.

== Reception ==
Reception

Aggregate scores
Aggregator	Score
Metacritic	(Xbox) 88/100 (PC) 87/100 (PS2) 86/100
OpenCritic	89/100; 100% Critics Recommend

Review scores
Publication	Score
Eurogamer	8/10
GameSpot	8.4/10
GameSpy	4.5/5
IGN	8.7/10
The Sydney Morning Herald	4.5/5

Psychonauts received positive reception, according to review aggregator website Metacritic. Schafer and Wolpaw's comedic writing was highly praised, as well as the uniqueness and quirks that the individual characters were given. Alex Navarro of GameSpot commented favorably on the "bizarre" cast of characters, their conversations that the player can overhear while exploring the camp, and how these conversations will change as the story progresses, eliminating repetition that is typical of such non-player characters in platform games. Tom Bramwell of Eurogamer found that he was incentivized to go back and explore or experiment in the game's level to find more of the comedic dialog that others had observed. The game was also noted for its innovations, such as the use of a second-person perspective during a boss battle.

The game's art and level design (in particular, the designs of the various mental worlds that Raz visits) were well-received. Jason Hill of the Sydney Morning Herald stated that each of the dream worlds "is a memorable journey through the bizarre inner psyche" of the associated character. Two particular levels have been considered iconic of the game's humor and style: the aforementioned Milkman Conspiracy, and Lungfishopolis, where Raz enters the mind of a lungfish monster that lives near camp; in the lungfish's mind Raz is portrayed as a giant monster akin to Godzilla that is attacking the tiny lungfish citizens of Lungfishopolis, effectively creating an absurd role reversal of the typical giant monster formula.

The overall game structure has been a point of criticism. Some reviewers identified that the first several hours of the game are focused on tutorials and instruction, and are less interesting than the later mental worlds. The game's final level, the "Meat Circus", was also considered unexpectedly difficult when compared to earlier sections of the game, featuring a time limit and many obstacles that required an unusual level of precision. On its re-release in 2011, Double Fine adjusted the difficulty of this level to address these complaints. Some found that the game's humor started to wane or become predictable in the latter part of the game.

GamingOnLinux reviewer Hamish Paul Wilson gave the game 8/10, praising the game's creativity and presentation, but also criticizing several other areas of the game, including the large number of unaddressed bugs. Wilson concluded that "Psychonauts has to be viewed as a flawed masterpiece". In 2010, the game was included as one of the titles in the book 1001 Video Games You Must Play Before You Die.

=== Awards ===
- E3 2005 Game Critics Awards: Best Original Game
- British Academy Video Games Awards 2006: Best Screenplay

The editors of Computer Games Magazine presented Psychonauts with their 2005 awards for "Best Art Direction" and "Best Writing", and named it the year's tenth-best computer game. They called the game "a wonderfully weird journey high on atmosphere, art direction, and creativity." Psychonauts won PC Gamer US's 2005 "Best Game You Didn't Play" award. The editors wrote, "Okay, look, we gave it an Editors' Choice award — that's your cue to run out right now and buy Tim Schafer's magnificent action/adventure game. So far, only about 12,000 PC gamers have." It was also a nominee for the magazine's "Game of the Year 2005" award, which ultimately went to Battlefield 2. During the 9th Annual Interactive Achievement Awards, Psychonauts received a nomination for "Outstanding Achievement in Game Design" by the Academy of Interactive Arts & Sciences. Psychonauts won the award for Best Writing at the 6th Annual Game Developers Choice Awards.

=== Sales ===
Psychonauts did not reach publisher Majesco's retail sale expectations. Although the game was first cited as the primary contributing factor to a strong quarter immediately following its launch, a month later Majesco revised their fiscal year projections from a net profit of $18 million to a net loss of $18 million, and at the same time its CEO, Carl Yankowski, announced his immediate resignation. By the end of the year, the title had shipped fewer than 100,000 copies in North America, and Majesco announced its plans to withdraw from the "big budget console game marketplace". Schafer stated that by March 2012 the retail version Psychonauts had sold 400,000 copies.

Following Double Fine's acquisition of the rights, they were able to offer the game on more digital storefronts and expand to other platforms; as previously described, this allowed the company to achieve sales in a short term far in excess of what they had been prior to obtaining the rights. In the announcement for Psychonauts 2 in December 2015, Schafer indicated that Psychonauts sold nearly 1.7 million copies, with more than 1.2 million occurring after Double Fine's acquisition of the rights. Double Fine lists 736,119 sold copies via the Humble Bundle (including a Steam key), 430,141 copies via the Steam storefront, 32,000 GOG.com copies, and 23,368 Humble Store copies. On Humble Bundle, the game sold well, with Schafer stating that they sold more copies of Psychonauts in the first few hours of the Bundle's start than they had since the release of the retail copy of the game. Later in 2012, Schafer commented that their ability to use digital venues such as Steam that "[Double Fine] made more on Psychonauts this year than we ever have before".

== Legacy ==
=== Sequels ===
A sequel to Psychonauts has been of great interest to Schafer, as well as to fans of the game and the gaming press. Schafer had pitched the idea to publishers but most felt the game too strange to take up. During the Kickstarter campaign for Double Fine's Broken Age in February 2012, Schafer commented on the development costs of a sequel over social media, leading to a potential interest in backing by Markus Persson, at the time the owner of Mojang. Though Persson ultimately did not fund this, interactions between him and Double Fine revealed the possibility of several interested investors to help.

In mid-2015, Schafer along with other industry leaders launched Fig, a crowd-sourced platform for video games that included the option for accredited investors to invest in the offered campaigns. Later, at the 2015 Game Awards in December, Schafer announced their plans to work on Psychonauts 2, using Fig to raise the $3.3 million needed to complete the game, with an anticipated release in 2018. The campaign succeeded on January 6, 2016. The sequel was released on August 25, 2021 and sees the return of Richard Horvitz and Nikki Rapp as the voices of Raz and Lili respectively, along with Wolpaw for writing, Chan and Campbell for art, and McConnell for music.

Additionally, Double Fine has developed a VR title called Psychonauts in the Rhombus of Ruin for use on Oculus Rift, HTC Vive, and PlayStation VR. Released in 2017, it serves as a standalone chapter to tie the original game and its sequel, based on Raz and the other Psychonauts rescuing Truman Zanotto. Psychonauts 2 was released on August 25, 2021.

=== Appearance in other media ===
The character Raz has made appearances in other Double Fine games, including as a massive Mount Rushmore-like mountain sculpture in Brütal Legend, and on a cardboard cutout within Costume Quest 2. Raz also appeared in a downloadable content package as a playable character for Bit.Trip Presents... Runner2: Future Legend of Rhythm Alien. A cameo of Raz appears in Alice: Madness Returns which can be found at the Red Queen's castle as a propped-up skeleton that bears a striking resemblance to the protagonist itself. There is also a hidden symbol of Raz in A Hat in Time which can be found using one of the hat abilities in a certain part of Chapters 3 Act 4.
