= Monkey Island 2: LeChuck's Revenge =

1991 adventure video game

- Developer: LucasArts
- Publishers: NA: LucasArts; EU: U.S. Gold
- Director: Ron Gilbert
- Producer: Shelley Day
- Designer: Ron Gilbert
- Programmers: Tim Schafer; Dave Grossman; Ron Gilbert; Bret Barrett; Tami Borowick
- Artists: Steve Purcell; Peter Chan; Sean Turner; Larry Ahern; James Alexander Dollar; Ken Macklin; Michael McLaughlin; Collette Michaud
- Writers: Tami Borowick; Dave Grossman; Bret Barrett; Tim Schafer; Ron Gilbert
- Composers: Michael Land; Peter McConnell; Clint Bajakian
- Series: Monkey Island
- Engine: SCUMM
- Platforms: Original version Amiga, FM Towns, Mac OS, MS-DOS; Special edition iOS, Windows, PlayStation 3, Xbox 360
- Release: Original version December 1991; Special edition 7 July 2010
- Genre: Graphic adventure
- Mode: Single-player

Monkey Island 2: LeChuck's Revenge is an adventure game developed and published by LucasArts in 1991. Players control the pirate Guybrush Threepwood, who searches for the legendary treasure of Big Whoop and faces the zombie pirate LeChuck.

Like The Secret of Monkey Island (1990), development was led by Ron Gilbert with Tim Schafer and Dave Grossman. Monkey Island 2 was the sixth LucasArts game to use the SCUMM engine and the first to use the iMUSE sound system.

Monkey Island 2 was a critical success, but a commercial disappointment. It was followed by The Curse of Monkey Island in 1997. A remake was released in 2010, following a similar remake of the first game. In 2022, Gilbert released Return to Monkey Island, set after the cliffhanger of Monkey Island 2.

== Gameplay ==
A scene in Monkey Island 2 shows the protagonist Guybrush Threepwood imprisoned on Phatt Island. Below the scene, the game displays the list of the verb commands and items in the player's inventory in a point-and-click menu.

LeChuck's Revenge plays like most SCUMM-based point-and-click adventure games. Actions and dialogues are depicted on an Animation Window which covers the top of the screen; verbal commands are listed in the lower left-hand corner of the screen, while Inventory items are shown as icons on the lower right-hand corner. A Sentence Line is located below the Animation Window and serves in describing the actions of the player.

LeChuck's Revenge was one of the few adventure games that offered the player a choice in levels of puzzle difficulty. In some versions, before starting, the player is prompted to choose between regular version and "Monkey 2 Lite", a relatively stripped-down experience that bypasses many puzzles entirely. On the back of the game's packaging it is jokingly stated that this mode is intended for video-game reviewers.

== Plot ==
Several months after the events of The Secret of Monkey Island, Guybrush Threepwood is on Scabb Island searching for the legendary treasure of "Big Whoop". He is robbed by Largo LaGrande, former first mate of the pirate LeChuck whose ghost Guybrush defeated in the previous game. Largo has imposed an embargo on the island, preventing anyone from leaving. Visiting the International House of Mojo in the island's swamp, Guybrush receives guidance from the Voodoo Lady who assisted him in his first adventure. Through actions involving laundry collection and grave-robbing, Guybrush collects the necessary materials for her to make a voodoo doll of Largo, which Guybrush uses against him. However, Guybrush makes the mistake of showing Largo LeChuck's still-living beard, which Largo steals and uses to resurrect LeChuck as an undead zombie.

From his island fortress, LeChuck swears revenge against Guybrush. The Voodoo Lady reveals that Big Whoop contains the secret to another world which will allow Guybrush to escape LeChuck forever. She gives Guybrush a book which says that the four pirates who discovered the treasure created a map to its location which they divided into four parts. One of the pirates was the grandfather of Guybrush's love interest, Elaine Marley, who has broken up with him. Guybrush charters a ship sailed by Captain Dread, and sets out to find the map pieces.

Guybrush's search takes him back and forth between three islands: Scabb, Phatt, and Booty. On Phatt Island he is imprisoned by order of Governor Phatt, who hopes to claim the bounty LeChuck has placed on him, but Guybrush manages to escape. On Booty Island he encounters Stan, a used ship salesman from the first game who is now selling used coffins. He also reunites with Elaine, who is bitter toward him and says that their relationship was a mistake. Through various quests involving a Mardi Gras party, a spitting competition, a bloodhound, a drinking contest, a glass-bottom boat, a sunken ship's figurehead, rigged gambling, a library catalog, and temporarily resurrecting the dead, Guybrush manages to collect the map pieces. He takes them to diminutive cartographer Wally, who determines that Big Whoop is on Dinky Island. Wally and the map are soon kidnapped by LeChuck. Guybrush infiltrates LeChuck's fortress but is captured, and LeChuck places him and Wally in an elaborate death-trap. They manage to escape, but Guybrush accidentally sets off an explosion which propels him to Dinky Island. There he encounters castaway Herman Toothrot, who he previously met on Monkey Island.

Navigating a mazelike jungle with the help of a talking parrot, Guybrush locates the site where Big Whoop is supposedly buried. He digs until he hits concrete, and uses dynamite to blast through it. Elaine hears the explosion from Booty Island and sets out to investigate, finding Guybrush dangling over a deep hole which he then falls down, winding up in an underground facility. LeChuck arrives, claims that he is Guybrush's brother, and proceeds to torture him using a voodoo doll. In the tunnels, Guybrush discovers an E ticket, a first aid station, a "lost parents" area with the skeletal remains of his parents, and an elevator leading to Mêlée Island, which he previously visited in The Secret of Monkey Island. He creates a voodoo doll of LeChuck, and dismembers his foe by tearing its leg off.

LeChuck begs Guybrush to remove his mask, revealing that he is actually Guybrush's creepy brother, Chuckie. Their reunion is interrupted by a workman, who says that "you kids" should not be there. The two brothers, now appearing as children, exit the tunnels together and meet their parents above-ground in the "Big Whoop" amusement park. Guybrush is confused, and Chuckie's eyes glow with evil energy. Back on Dinky Island, Elaine wonders if LeChuck has cast a spell over Guybrush.

== Development ==
=== Origin ===
The idea of a sequel to The Secret of Monkey Island came about during its planning by the director, Lucasfilm Games employee Ron Gilbert. Gilbert envisioned The Secret of Monkey Island as the first of a trilogy of adventure games, although without fully developing their overarching narrative direction yet. The possibility of a second Monkey Island game was alluded to by Gilbert in a late 1990 interview with in-company newsletter The Adventurer, and he told Retro Gamer in 2006 that "I knew there was going to be a sequel" before he completed work on The Secret of Monkey Island. He proceeded to conceive ideas specifically for Monkey Island 2 before Lucasfilm Games set about publishing Secret. Gilbert remarked that his opportunity to develop the sequel came in part from the company's contemporary project management practices which he likened to the narrative setting of Lord of the Flies, as the staff was free to "[run] around and do whatever we wanted". Further motivation for Monkey Island 2 stemmed from Lucasfilm Games staff's desire to explore unused ideas from The Secret of Monkey Island. Gilbert explained that, although the earlier game's team had omitted several of its design decisions to complete it within deadline, "it didn't matter [...] because I could just save the work out and come back to it in the sequel".

The reason Monkey Island 2 began, according to Gilbert, was his personal interest in expanding his work in the original game rather than commercially driven suggestions from Lucasfilm Games' management. Gilbert commented that the game's origin would have been improbable in the latter case, as the company was unable to assess the viability of a potential sequel due to its then limited knowledge of the first title's sales performance. The initial uncertainty of the first game's commercial success also encouraged Gilbert to start the Monkey Island 2 project without express approval of the wider company. He wanted to avoid a scenario where Lucasfilm Games' discontent with the first game's sales would prompt the company to forfeit any new Monkey Island titles in favor of ventures with greater consumer appeal such as Star Wars licensed games. Gilbert eventually convinced Lucasfilm Games to commit to the creation of the sequel regardless of its profitability, a decision which Gilbert attributed to the "simpler days" of that period of his involvement with the company.

In 1990, around the time that the development of Monkey Island 2 was sanctioned, Lucasfilm Games and other Lucasfilm subsidiaries were reorganized into integrated divisions of the newly formed LucasArts Entertainment Company. Monkey Island 2 thus became the first adventure game by the company produced under the LucasArts brand name. Development of Monkey Island 2: LeChuck's Revenge began shortly after The Secret of Monkey Island's release in October 1990. As with most of their contemporary releases, LucasArts developed the sequel and published the game's original release.

=== Production ===
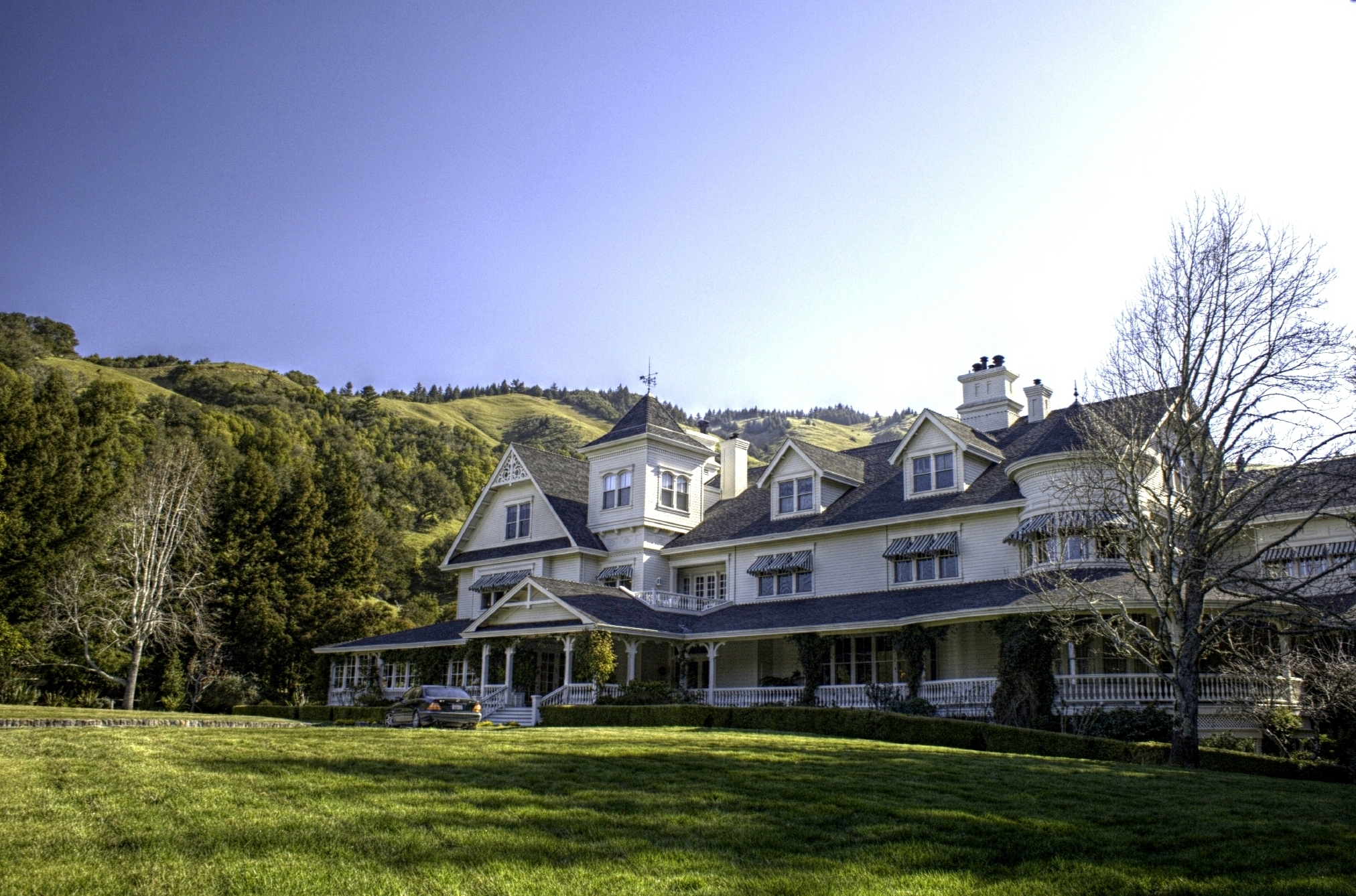
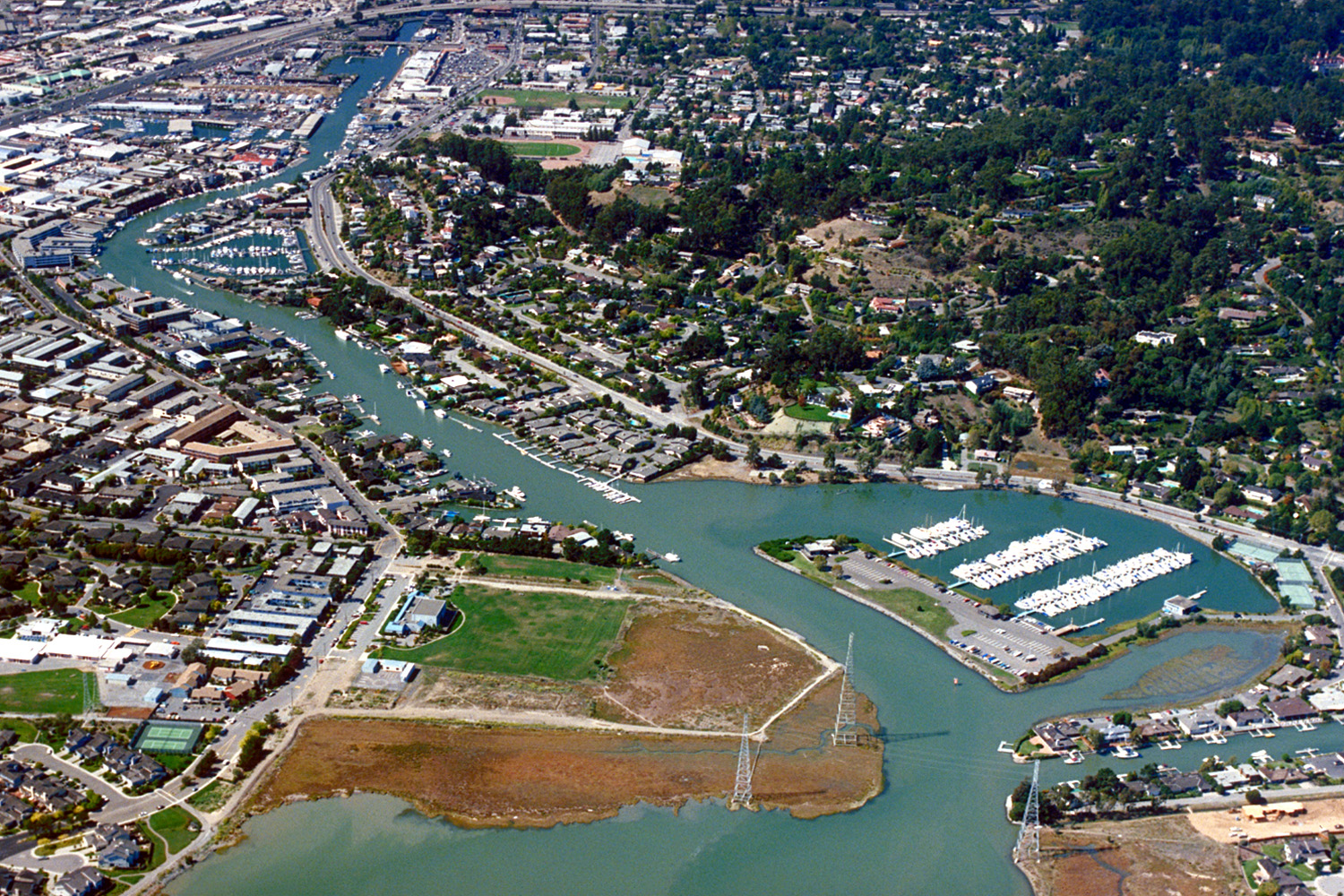
In 1990, prior to the release of Monkey Island 2: LeChuck's Revenge, the staff of LucasArts (formerly Lucasfilm Games) relocated from their original workplace at Skywalker Ranch (left) to offices in nearby San Rafael, California (right).

LucasArts sought to commit its projects to a new, more structured production template, to which Monkey Island 2 was one of the company' first games to conform, along with Indiana Jones and the Fate of Atlantis. This meant that a dedicated production schedule was set, under which further "rough due-dates" were decided and a fully recruited team was allotted to Monkey Island 2.

The principal staff members from the original game reprised their duties for the creation of its sequel. Gilbert reassumed the role of project leader, and The Secret of Monkey Island co-designers, programmers and writers Tim Schafer and Dave Grossman also returned to work on Monkey Island 2 in their respective capacities. Grossman briefly disengaged from the production when LucasArts requested him to assist The Dig's then-director Noah Falstein in the early development of that title. After concluding this assignment, Grossman resumed his work on Monkey Island 2 until its completion. Staff returning from The Secret of Monkey Island also included lead artist and cover illustrator Steve Purcell; animator Sean Turner; composer Michael Land; LucasArts playtesting supervisor Judith Lucero, who also authored the instruction manual; and game tester James Hampton. At the same time, Monkey Island 2 was supplemented with newly hired personnel such as artists Peter Chan and Larry Ahern as well as a scripter-programmer. Shelley Day, formerly of Electronic Arts, was appointed to produce Monkey Island 2 at LucasArts alongside Indiana Jones and the Fate of Atlantis.

==== Engine and interface ====
Monkey Island 2 uses the fifth revision of LucasArts' proprietary game engine, SCUMM. The company added a dedicated interpreter for the scripting language (internally dubbed SPUTUM), and background programs that managed the location of objects and characters and simulated character activities. This included FLEM, the code for object states and walking area boundaries, and BILE, a "cel-based animation emulator" that allowed artists to animate individual body parts. The variety of subset programs allowed the engine to execute multiple script functions for an entity, such as those handling the rendition of its audiovisual data. Though the engine was designed as cross-platform, Monkey Island 2 was developed for IBM PC compatibles with the MS-DOS operating system, as with LucasArts' other games at the time.

Also revised was the graphical user interface, which employed verb-based commands as player input. For increased accessibility, the team enlarged the point-and-click command list menu, and they removed the "turn on" and "turn off" options. They also updated the player inventory, which replaced the text-only descriptions with icons.

The revised engine offered programmers shortcut commands for the coding of the objects. Nonetheless, a LucasArts programmer team admitted during production that even with this technique, they contributed around nine man-months to finalize the object-oriented programming in Monkey Island 2. On the other hand, in 1992 Rik Haynes of CU Amiga commented that SCUMM's capacity as a high-level programming language helped the creative staff members "to focus on being creative rather than worrying about technical mumbo jumbo". Similarly, in 2013 Ron Gilbert recalled that the underlying functionalities of the SCUMM system enabled the staff to incorporate new ideas into the interactive environment directly after suggestion, which thus introduced an aspect of iterative design in the production.

==== Logistics ====
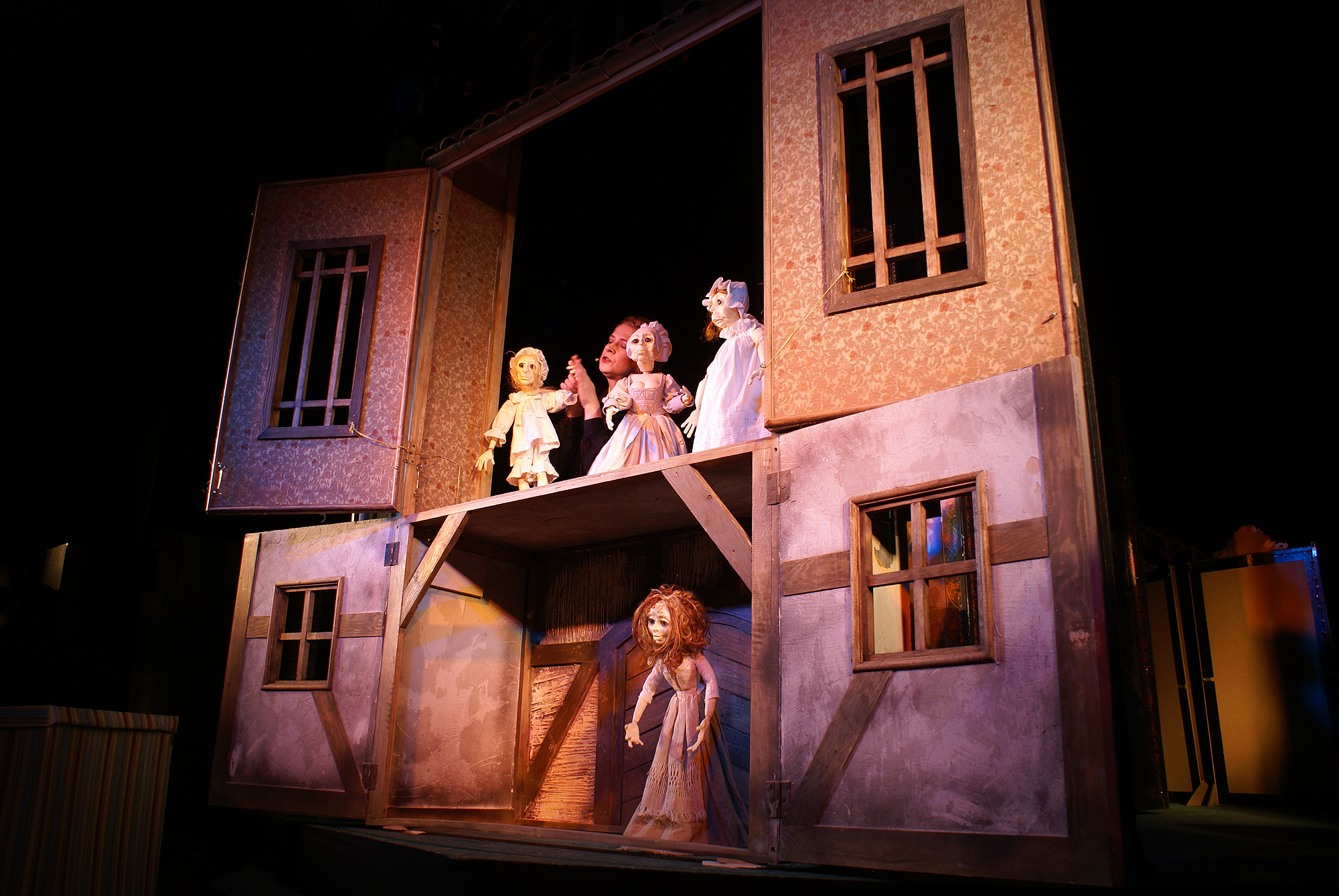
The designers fashioned the presentation of Monkey Island 2 after that of a puppet show (example pictured above) to help minimize production costs.

The overlap between the development assets for the first two Monkey Island games meant that both projects occurred continuously, as a singular creative process. As such, the staff carried over into the sequel the majority of their previously unrealized ideas for the first game. Grossman noted that Monkey Island 2 underwent a smooth development cycle because of how cheaply games in its genre could be made. Specifically, he likened a typical adventure title of that period to a puppet theatre performance as opposed to a cinematic work with film-like qualities, and believed that the adoption of the former approach allowed LucasArts to build the plotline and gameplay without excessive resources.

The company also decided on a "tight" way of distributing its Monkey Island 2 staff as further streamlining the development. As a result, the creative personnel were allotted to small groups that worked across a series of planning sessions to establish the narrative and gameplay features. During development, the artistic staff were situated on a different floor of LucasArts' headquarters building from the location of the designers; the latter were thus required to pay frequent visits to the office of the graphics specialists to review their works-in-progress. Although intended from the very beginning to exceed the scope of its predecessor, Rob Smith estimated that Monkey Island 2 ultimately involved around the same number of development staff as The Secret of Monkey Island. In retrospect, Gilbert recalled the number of personnel that worked on the sequel to be larger than that of his previous game, albeit "small enough that we all talked every day and everyone had a good understanding of the whole game being made". He added that the creation of Monkey Island 2 was devoid of disagreements within the team, and that they were able to resolve situational production concerns in the ordinary course of the development.

==== Three phases ====
Three production phases, known as "passes" within the company, divided Monkey Island 2's development, as with LucasArts' other contemporary adventure games. As part of its streamlining of in-house development practices, LucasArts employed image scanning and digitization methods to generate assets for Monkey Island 2. In the first "pass", artists originally created hand-drawn images of environments, termed "rooms", in the form of pencil sketches. The outline drawings were processed through a Sharp color scanner and the resulting digitized graphics were submitted to a group of programmers to be input to the technological framework. The latter task involved the setting of boundaries for the interactive space of a "room", integrating in it choices for the dialogue trees, and the programming for the objects within the modeled scene. The emphasis of the first "pass" was to program everything as fast as possible. The first phase produced an early build of Monkey Island 2 which featured monochrome scenes navigated by placeholder characters from a number of other then in-development LucasArts games. After this version was delivered LucasArts held an internal "pizza orgy" to commemorate the occasion, during which personnel from the wider company were involved in the initial playtesting and were engaged to offer design input. The early build informed the work of LucasArts' marketing department on the artwork for the packaging materials, in particular that of the cover.

In the second phase of production, output from the initial stage was revised, as the artists and programmers reiterated on and refined their earlier work. The sketch-based monochrome graphics were processed through the Photoshop graphics editing software on a Macintosh II computer, being reworked into more detailed images of the background scenery. The basic graphics and animations of the characters were created with DeluxePaint Animation and later implemented along with the modified environmental visuals into the then current builds of Monkey Island 2. The artists spent up to an entire day revising graphics for an in-game scene; by contrast, they only required roughly an hour-and-a-half per one placeholder visual.

LucasArts' marketing department was given the graphics materials. LucasArts gave to publications such as Computer Gaming World the latest builds of Monkey Island 2 and gameplay screenshots for press coverage. Also around this time LucasArts completed the packaging solution for Monkey Island 2: the marketers put still images of the provisional art into the design of the backside of the retail box. Concurrently, the company organized the demonstrations at trade shows and the involvement of focus groups in the development. In June 1991, LucasArts showed Monkey Island 2: LeChuck's Revenge, then temporarily titled The Secret of Monkey Island II, alongside Indiana Jones and the Fate of Atlantis at the Summer Consumer Electronics Show. That month, Paul Presley of The One estimated that the game was "still a long way from completion", and later in August, Amaya Lopez of Zero reported that the sequel was to be released for PCs and the Amiga in late 1991.

The third and last phase required LucasArts to "put the absolute finishing touches", as put by Johnny L. Wilson of Computer Gaming World, to the entirety of the previously developed material for Monkey Island 2. As production continued, personnel began to work overtime to complete the assets, a trend which would extend to the company's later games such as Day of the Tentacle. Schafer told Edge in 2009 that at the time, the staff members disregarded the risk of personal strain from crunch time practices because most of them had shared similar past experiences during higher education, as an outgrowth of the necessity to reside in dormitories and study at underground facilities on campus territory.

Summarizing his overview of the development, Wilson suggested that LucasArts' three-part process proved to be "a mixed blessing": although intended to provide momentum to the overall production, the procedure only simplified the programmers' workload in the first phase, offset by "trade-offs" to the performance of the remaining staff members. However, Rob Smith retroactively indicated that the team maintained a "straightforward" pace of development, in part due to familiarity with SCUMM's nuances grown from their past work. He specifically noted that the SCUMM engine's capabilities allowed them to introduce concepts, dialogues, and interactive scenes at all phases of development, even directly ahead of release. According to Smith, the convenience of the team's situation enabled them to conclude work within one year from its start. Gilbert said that the development staff did not encounter corporate pressure, and reported that the sequel's creation provided him with satisfaction, although "perhaps not as much as the first one".

==== Release and format ====
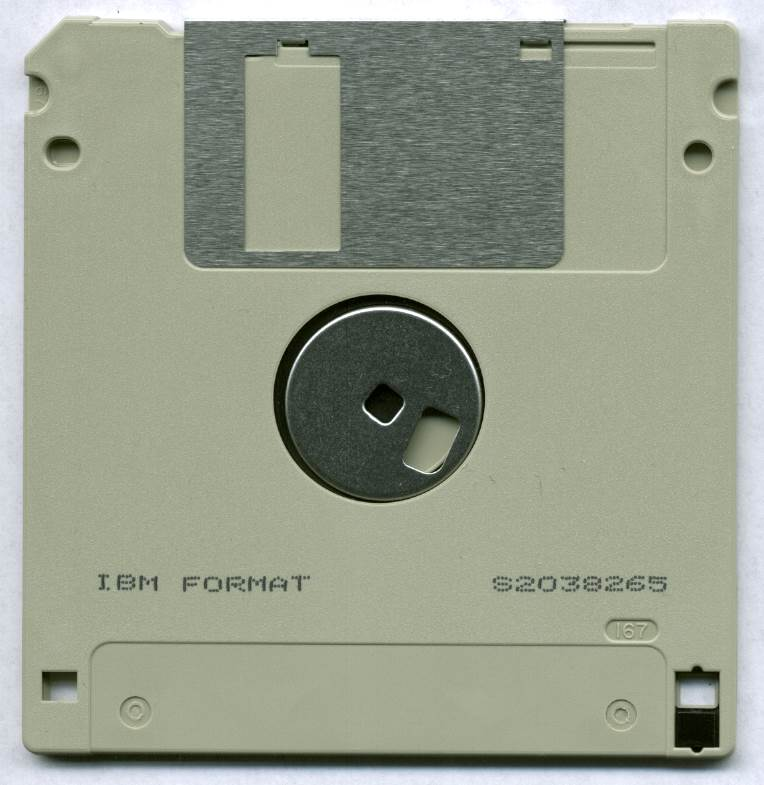
LucasArts’ choice to distribute Monkey Island 2: LeChuck's Revenge on the floppy disk medium led to the omission of certain narrative sequences from the final product.

Monkey Island 2: LeChuck's Revenge was originally released on six floppy disks for IBM PCs as well as for MS-DOS and Mac OS in December 1991. Gilbert said the floppy format led him to excise five scenes to fit it in the allotted size limitations. By the month of its initial release, the sequel's launch for the Amiga was delayed to early 1992, and U.S. Gold, LucasArts' product distributor in Europe, was the publisher in the relevant territories. The Amiga version was ultimately released in Summer 1992; the development house in charge of the conversion divided Monkey Island 2 into four sequential playable sections that were distributed across eleven floppy disks to adapt to the platform's memory constraints.

Although CD-ROM releases of adventure games had become widespread by the time of Monkey Island 2's publication, Gilbert was unwilling to develop such a version. His rationale was that the intricacies of the CD medium, such as a slower data transfer rate than that of contemporary high-end PCs' internal hard drives, would prove ill-suited to the developing standards of the adventure genre. LucasArts later carried over the revised SCUMM-based interface from Monkey Island 2 into the updated CD-ROM version of The Secret of Monkey Island, released in 1992 for IBM PCs.

That year, Gilbert left LucasArts alongside Shelley Day to co-found Humongous Entertainment, a developer of edutainment games for younger audiences. After likewise departing from the former company in 1994, Grossman moved to join Gilbert in his new venture, and Schafer remained at LucasArts as a designer until 2000 when he and several other staff members left to establish Double Fine.

=== Design and writing ===
==== Overall principles ====
The main idea was to expand on The Secret of Monkey Island's narrative scope and gameplay elements. Gilbert wanted a more open-ended adventure game than the first game, where one navigates confined isolated areas. Consequently, he decided on exploration of multiple islands as the overarching feature of Monkey Island 2's gameplay. In August 1991, Gilbert described it as the most nonlinear game being produced at LucasArts at the time.

Competing games in the genre such as Sierra On-Line's King's Quest IV served as a reference point for Gilbert: he intended the sequel to forgo those titles' tendency to kill the protagonist for player mistakes in favor of a more forgiving model. This approach coincided with his earlier concept that had been applied in The Secret of Monkey Island, which was designed to exclude the ability to die in it so as to emphasize the narrative and puzzle-solving. This is realized as the story being a flashback recounted by Guybrush to his love interest Elaine Marley; whenever a decision would lead to Guybrush's death (such as not escaping LeChuck's deathtrap), Elaine will interject that this contradicts Guybrush being alive in front of her, allowing the player to retry. One of Gilbert's other ideas was that the average challenge level in contemporary adventure games was too low and harmed their play value, and he thus sought to make Monkey Island 2 tougher overall.

==== Two difficulty modes ====
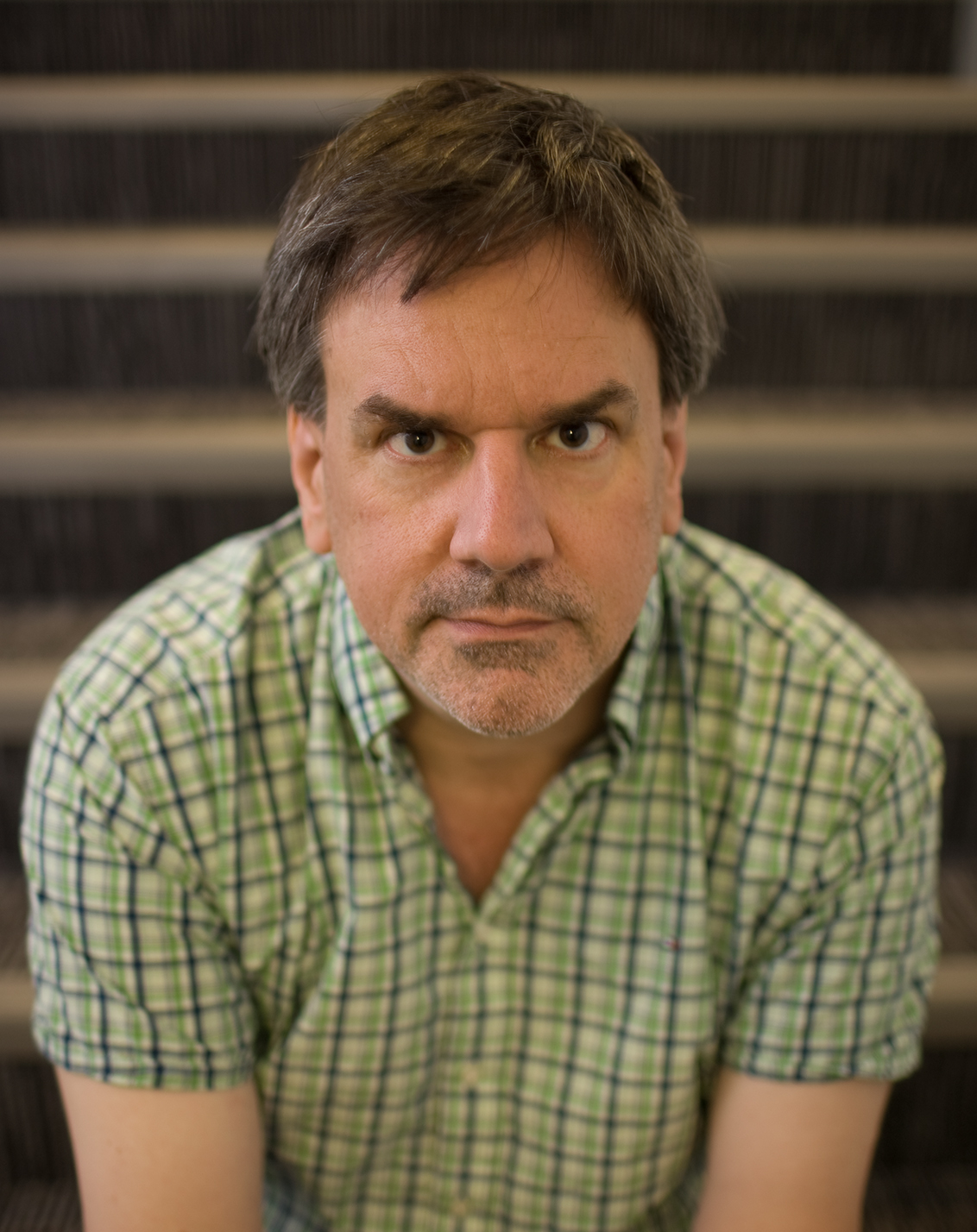
Director Ron Gilbert (2013 photograph) supervised design areas such as the difficulty and puzzle structure, and conceived the storyline.

Ensuring the accessibility of the gameplay to the widest variety of players regardless of their skill was a related concern of the team. To this end, Gilbert decided to introduce alternative difficulty levels: the game would adapt the composition and complexity of its playable sections according to a preferred gameplay mode chosen from a prompt at the start. He initially wanted the sequel to offer three escalating grades of difficulty, a feature which was in its originally revealed build. Only two options of gameplay were ultimately implemented, specifically the streamlined and abridged mode, "Monkey Lite", and the mainline complex one, "Monkey Classic".

Monkey Lite was set to give players an overview of the basics, as a sample of the content in the full version. The creation of the dual difficulty system was troublesome for the team, in that they were required to avoid repetition in the two variations and to distinguish their solutions. Noah Falstein concluded in 1992 that the twofold interactive experience served to make the sequel appealing both to newcomers to the Monkey Island franchise and to skilled players who expected a challenging sequel. Similarly, Gilbert later stated his belief of the feature's continued relevance for modern adventure game design, as he perceived a growth of casual gamers who appreciated gameplay avenues suited for their decreasing free time.

The team's design practices were unaffected by the mode division as they had decided against developing the basis of Monkey Island 2 by incrementally building on the simplified model. Instead, they did the inverse: the development staff originally implemented the hard mode as the core template and then restructured this into an abbreviated counterpart. To that end, they gradually reviewed the planned layout of mandatory play segments, reconsidering each puzzle solution. Gilbert gave this example: if the team discovered a puzzle that required players to obtain a key to a locked in-game doorway after their progress through many in-between events, the team would render the passage readily open to hasten the resolution of that part. To accomplish a "presolved" adaptation of the game in its easy mode, they identified chains of puzzles within the design and then excised or modified those sequences' elements. Rather than to substantially reimagine the story and gameplay for the shorter variant, the designers' focus was merely to determine which sections could be easily revised so as to retain satisfactory overall pacing. Gilbert recalled that the underlying technology allowed LucasArts to alter and adjust elements of the title on an impromptu basis. Gilbert found this practice to exhibit his preference to base his games on broadly defined plans, as opposed to precise design documents, and admitted that he would struggle to direct a similar work to Monkey Island 2 in the face of formalized development procedures.

==== Puzzles ====
The design of Monkey Island 2 was a more collaborative process compared to The Secret of Monkey Island's, where the team had built on Gilbert's own concepts and outlines developed before production. The creation of the sequel's puzzles involved the principal writers and programmers, whose output Rik Haynes described as "funny and bizarre". For example, Schafer was responsible for an in-game contest about spitting the furthest, which players are tasked to win – a challenge he believed to be unique in adventure games at the time. Artists were also encouraged to submit opinions during planning. Grossman recalled that the staff held the corresponding meetings in a confined working space, and "those sessions often became hilarious enough to be dangerous, with me asthmatically coughing up my own brain from laughing too much".

Gilbert managed design: he mapped out what he called "Puzzle Dependecy Charts", schematic diagrams depicting how the puzzles relate to each other, which he generated with the MicroPlanner X-Pert software on a Macintosh computer. With these he planned the puzzles and their solutions into branching structures, as models of long- and short-term goals that players were to advance through in his games. As part of this technique, Gilbert also laid out chains of successive puzzles, designed in reverse: the goals of preceding puzzles were recursively derived from the solutions of following ones. These puzzle sequences were then aligned as whole units into flowchart-like representations, where the solution of the initial part segued into separate branches for player progress, before ending at a common in-game destination. From that convergence point, a further diagram of the same type would be spun off into subsequent, similarly ordered schemes; the reiteration of those patterns formed the overall puzzle framework in Gilbert's projects at LucasArts, including Monkey Island 2.

In the design of specific puzzles, the team mimicked a player's approach to solving them. In a 2006 interview with Retro Gamer, Grossman illustrated the general planning method with a puzzle involving Monkey Island 2 character Captain Kate. From this mindset, the team began by setting an in-game objective of stealing an item from the character. They proceeded to identify every realistic solution to the situation – which included the player covertly embezzling the item or coercing Captain Kate into yielding it – and gradually forwent banal solution possibilites until the exhaustion of such ideas. Having discarded those options entirely, the team moved to devise an unorthodox resolution to the puzzle: requiring players to cause the arrest of Captain Kate in order for the character's belongings to become accessible. The designers' consequent goal was to develop the logic of events within which this could come to pass. As outlined by Grossman, those criteria guided the team's entire work on the development of the puzzles.

Gameplay segments were arranged around the multiple settings, and Gilbert described the result as "a complicated web of puzzles [...] [that] kind of jumbled all around", in contrast to The Secret of Monkey Island's more linear approach. He also noted that the puzzle structure in the sequel was distinguished by its greater reliance on "dialogue puzzles", a term for nonlinear scenarios of player-driven conversations with the characters which feature alternative response options.

The team's co-authorship of the design contributed to the increased complexity of its puzzles, including their emergence in consecutive successions. Although Gilbert said that the sequel epitomized his accrued experience and practices in attempting to create a comprehensive template of an adventure game, he also said that certain puzzles and scenes qualified as redundant in retrospect. Specifically, Gilbert, Schafer and Grossman cited concerns with the puzzle wherein players were meant to use an earlier-captured monkey as an improvised wrench to open a passageway to a new location, punning on the English language term "monkey wrench". Grossman explained that, whereas the intended wordplay was understood by the domestic audience due to the phrase's predominance in the United States, it was unknown outside the North American market and thus was difficult to translate. Gilbert later described this as his least accomplished puzzle design and apologized to players. The experience led him to realize that his games' potential distribution beyond the American market would necessitate cultural adaptation of their contextual elements, an aspect Gilbert has attempted to account for in his subsequent works. Gilbert nevertheless believed he was able to materialize the vast majority of his plans for Monkey Island 2. However, previously, after the release, Gilbert said he "[was] still trying to figure out how to get everything I want into an adventure game".

==== Story ====
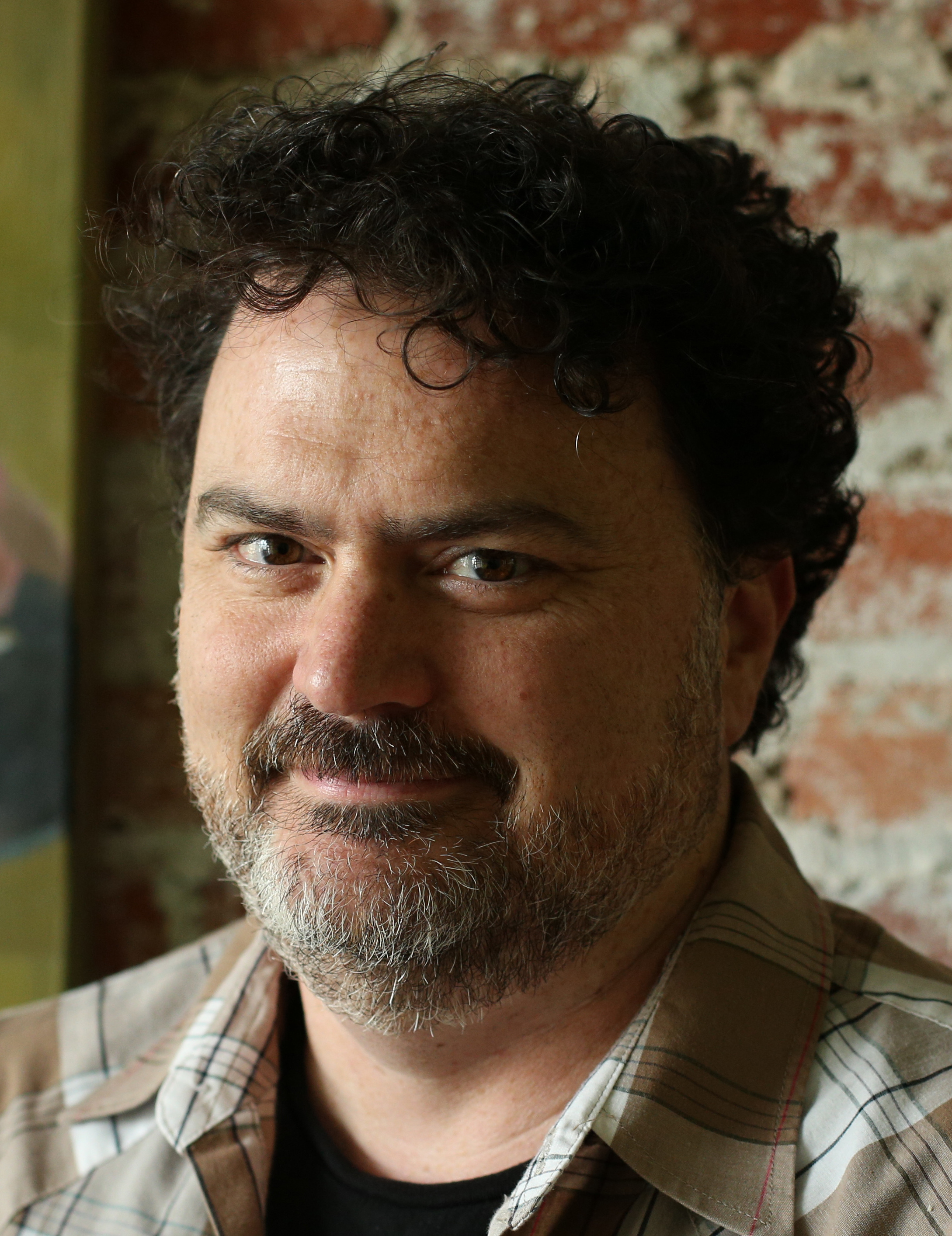
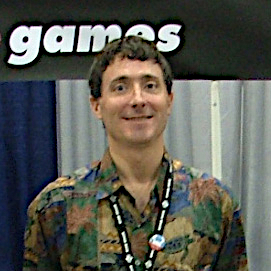
Tim Schafer (left, 2016 photograph) and Dave Grossman (right, 2007 photograph) co-wrote the game's plot with Gilbert and supplied programming.

The puzzles in Monkey Island 2 were created prior to its storyline, as with its predecessor; the vast majority of the plot's details were unestablished when the project started. Gilbert's puzzle charts supplied the general layout of the narrative, and the team then "made [the storyline] up as we went".

Gilbert believed that the theme of revenge served as a universally resonant narrative premise, and the story was thus based around LeChuck seeking vengeance against Guybrush Threepwood for defeating the former in the previous game. As with the previous game, Gilbert distributed the writing duties for discrete sections between Schafer and Grossman, and assigned each of them to individual scenes and characters in accordance with the designers' comic sensibilities.

Monkey Island 2 was "a little bit dark" intrinsically yet simultaneously conducive to comedic writing, Gilbert acknowledged in 2014; earlier he had remarked that he regarded it as an avenue to realize the unexplored humorous material intended for its predecessor. Several months after the release, Schafer described Monkey Island 2 as a parodic game ironically subverting its own archetypical traits and those of other contemporary computer games. He explained that "every time that you expected a payoff, [the game] would do something that was kind of a non-payoff" and that the humor was "not for everybody".

The characters were developed from this conceptualized story foundation. Gilbert noted that certain returning characters from the previous game were carried over due to their popularity among the staff, and others, such as the Voodoo Lady, were included to reinforce particular motifs in the story. Rik Haynes commented that, aside from the conversations with the characters that were added solely for atmosphere, specific dialogues were written to telegraph suggestions to players. Among references to non-interactive media, LucasArts added a tribute to the Pirates of the Caribbean attraction - which provided the stylistic inspiration for the first game - as well as numerous nods to the Indiana Jones and Star Wars franchises, and an allusion to the James Bond films.

Reconciling the planned puzzles with the narrative was a major focus for the designers. Rik Haynes reported that Gilbert "was so absorbed by the process, in fact, that he even solved tricky problems in his sleep".

==== Playtesting ====
Contiguous suggestions addressing playability came from LucasArts game testers as they reviewed various development builds. Gilbert recalled an instance during development when Judith Lucero and members of her team e-mailed him an extensive overhaul proposal for the then current version. James Hampton stated that this document, internally dubbed the "Giant 'D' ('D' for 'Design') Bug", was collaboratively developed by him and the other testers and offered "our ideas and reactions to the earliest builds". They recommended in particular additions to the length and difficulty, and specified edits to the storyline and puzzles. Discussing Gilbert's response, Hampton noted that he encouraged agency among the development staff over the course of the creative process and thus approved of the testers' considerations.

A number of their concepts were therefore implemented in the finished game, such as "screwball" cutscenes depicting between-island travels of the player character in the overworld map, as a pastiche of analogous scenes in the Indiana Jones films. Also carried over from the proposal was a library location with a multitude of references to the events and easter eggs from the team, via an interactive card catalog. Reminiscing on the testers' contributions, Gilbert said that they "have a unique perspective on the game and poke not only at the bugs but also the design and the thought process of playing a game" and "are a critical gear in the machinery that makes up making a game".

==== Ending ====
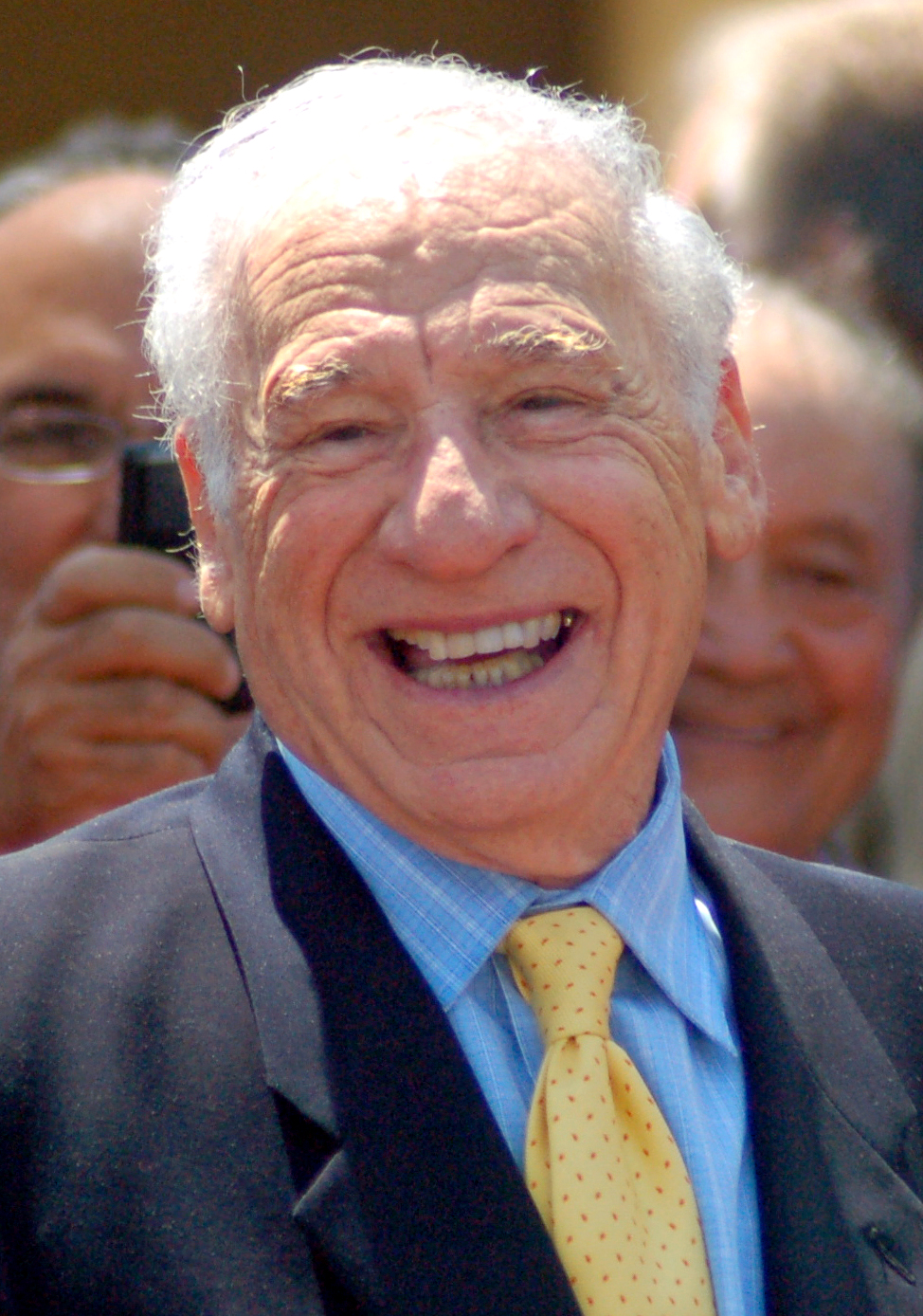
Ron Gilbert's favorite film Blazing Saddles, directed by Mel Brooks (2010 photograph), served as a source of inspiration for the ending of Monkey Island 2.

Planning the ending was another problem wherein Gilbert sought input from LucasArts staff beyond the principal creative team. He had struggled to conceive a satisfactory finale, and postponed the issue repeatedly during production. As such, by the time LucasArts moved to finalize Monkey Island 2, Gilbert's concern with developing the conclusion was renewed.

James Hampton claimed that a meeting was held to establish the climax with LucasArts game testers, during which his suggestion for an ending akin to the St. Elsewhere finale - which revealed the events of that show to exist in a dream-like fictional universe - provided the basis for the closing scenes. Gilbert said the denouement was inspired by his anxiety over the lack of a suitable concept as development neared completion. He explained that he came up with the used ending spontaneously, when "one day, literally laying in bed on a Saturday morning, it just kind of hit me".

Gilbert later indicated that the ending was intended to convey a metaphor rather than to be subject to a literal interpretation. Schafer regarded it as an outgrowth of the subversive humor, and admitted that the climax was contrary to popular expectations. Gilbert acknowledged that the sequel's conclusion was controversial among players since its release, and that he had planned the ending to invoke conflicted sentiments "from day one". He explained that he made the ending purposely provocative to elicit differing public perceptions of it, a reaction which he believed to be evidence of creative accomplishment. Although Gilbert said in 2015 that the finale provided "perfect" closure for the storyline, he had conceded after his departure from LucasArts that the ending's ambiguousness complicated any plans of a direct continuation. Specifically, he expressed his belief that the development team for the next installment, The Curse of Monkey Island, "would mention that I had made their life hell". Gilbert nevertheless asserted that the completion of the Monkey Island 2 project marked his discovery of a hypothetical plot device with which he could build on the sequel's narrative and finish the overarching story arc of his planned adventure game trilogy.

=== Visual design ===
==== New technology ====
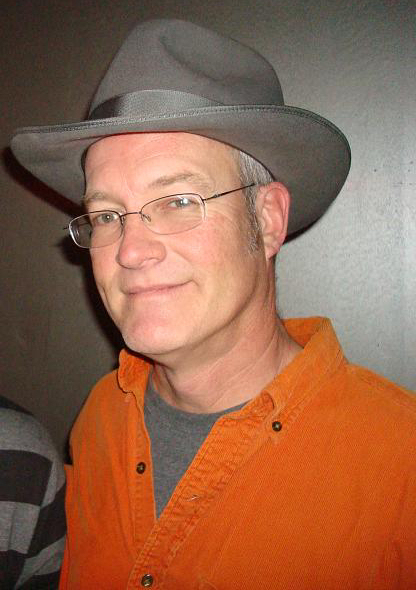
Lead artist Steve Purcell (2008 photograph) was responsible for several principal facets of the graphics design, including the cover artwork, and attempted to ensure visual continuity between the game and its predecessor.

The company's then-ongoing push to modernize its graphics production pipeline also encompassed the creation of Monkey Island 2's visuals. The company allotted more artists than in its past projects to Monkey Island 2, divided into two groups: background artists and animation specialists. This staff layout came from LucasArts's wider decision to increase the total art resources of its planned titles, mandated by the evolving technological demands of the computer game industry. Specifically, VGA had become the graphics standard for high-end personal computers and hard drives had dropped in price when Monkey Island 2's completion drew close. Steve Purcell mentioned that, whereas the mainline EGA-compatible version of the previous game had a limited 16 color palette, the company's adoption of the VGA format's 256-color scheme for the sequel meant that "we had all the colors we needed".

Atypical devices for realizing the static visuals were considered to enhance its graphical quality. Competing companies Sierra On-Line and Dynamix had around that time released several titles whose graphics were generated from scanned images and digitized live-action footage. The success of those titles prompted LucasArts to incorporate scanning into the production of their visuals. Purcell later explained that the artists' capability to initially model the in-game locations on paper and then to implement the images digitally lent them "a greater range".

After experimenting with various art media in the creation of the environmental paintings, LucasArts developed a process that involved an amalgam of graphical techniques. Initially, the artists used colored pen markers to draw a rough sketch of a scene – an approach originated by Peter Chan – whose details they then augmented and reinforced by applying paint. They finalized the overlaid drawing with colored pencils to eliminate "soft edges". Upon digitizing them, further adjustments and effects "not easily achieved with traditional painting methods" were added with proprietary graphics software.

The background artwork was primarily developed by Chan and partly created by Purcell, who was responsible for locations such as the interior of Wally B. Feed's cabin in Woodtick. Sean Turner also painted the visual designs for certain scenes. Purcell sought to impart depth to the background graphics by adding elements suggesting a foreground visual dimension in settings such as the Bloody Lip Bar, a playable location in Woodtick. Purcell attempted to provide the environmental visuals with humorous imagery, which, in his example from that same scene, meant details "like the spitoon with overshot loogies all over the doorframe". He also tended to introduce anachronistic visual elements in the background artwork, although one, a "50's era jukebox" that was planned to feature in the Bloody Lip Bar, was omitted from the final game. Overall, Rik Haynes estimated the resulting graphics assets to comprise around 6.4 million pixels of on-screen visual information.

==== Animation ====
Ron Gilbert sought to ensure a "simple and cartoony" style for the characters' movements, in keeping with the previous game. The relevant art team was led by Turner, a former employee of Lucasfilm subsidiary Industrial Light & Magic, and also included Michaud, Larry Ahern, Mike McLaughlin and Steve Purcell. Turner's primary responsibility was to shape the aesthetics and style of the dynamic visuals.

An experienced specialist in traditional animation, Turner wanted his work with 2D digital visuals to exceed the limitations of the computer graphics medium. Turner utilized two distinct procedures to develop his output: the artwork was alternately built with software tools in DeluxePaint Animation and scanned from sequences of hand-drawn cel images. The latter method was primarily employed to animate large objects; the artists found their efforts streamlined when such assets were originally depicted on paper and then imported into a suitable form for digital manipulation. LucasArts still used the software-based solution to generate the majority of the characters' animations, whose creation the art staff believed to be faster under a computer interface. Michaud stated that Turner's professional background and humorous sensibilities inspired the individual contributions of his team, "allowing them to open up and have some fun with the animations".

Gilbert instructed the animators by providing them with lists describing the game's entities that were required to move in specific scenes. Ahern tells of a case where, early in his part of the project, he was unable to discern the in-game context for his work due to Gilbert's abstract directions. Ahern said he "tried asking questions about it, and [Gilbert] said, 'Just do this, this, this, and this, laundry list, check it off', and I got real frustrated with that". He then enquired with Schafer and Grossman about the purpose of the actions he was to choreograph. The co-designers proceeded to describe to him the intended effect of the respective scenes, and "I'd say, 'Oh, well, wouldn't it be more fun if I did it this way', and they'd go, 'Yeah, that'd be even better. Go do that'". As a result, Ahern asked Schafer and Grossman to negotiate Gilbert's approval for his proposal, a concern which the two agreed to address.

==== Cover ====
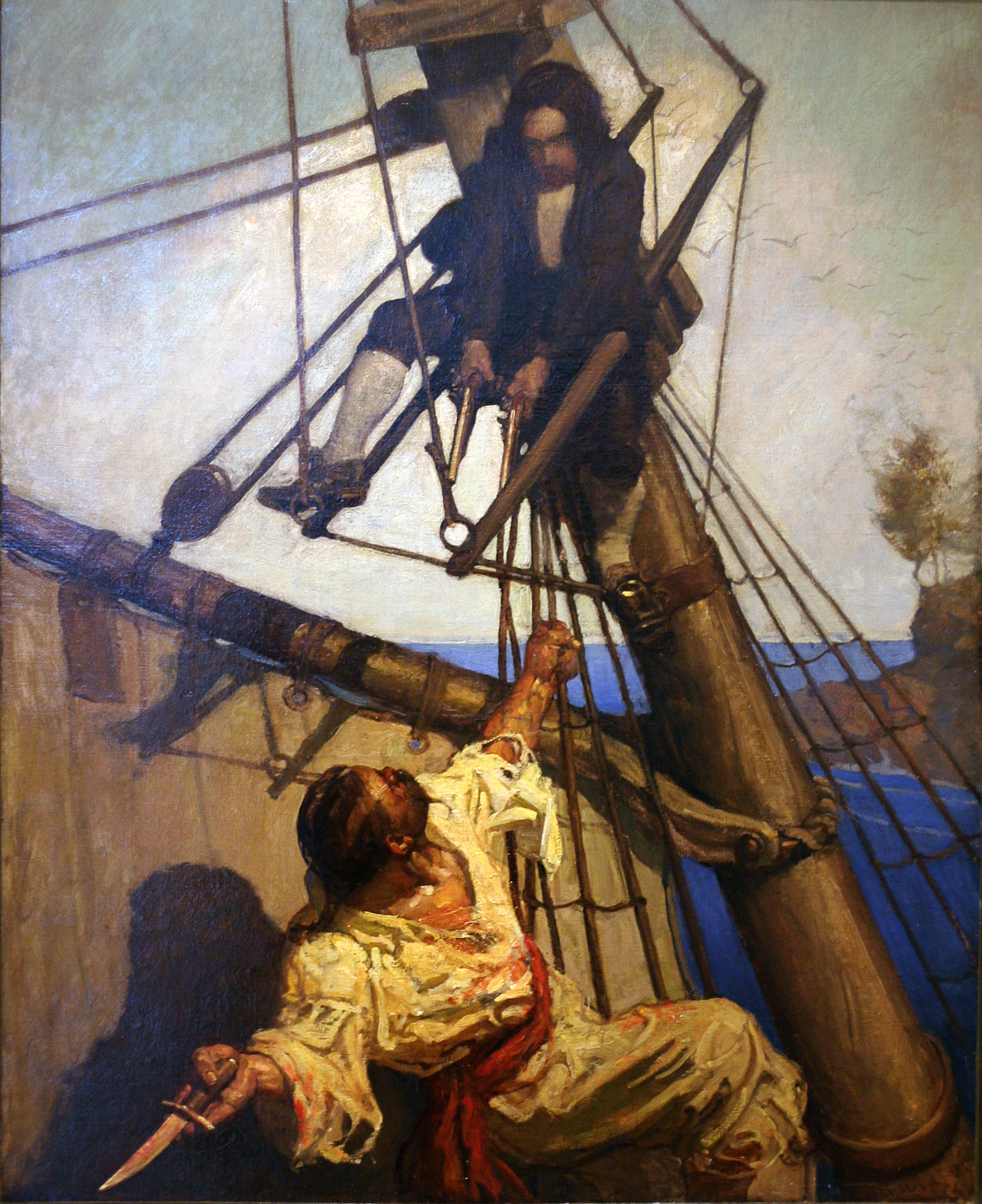
The cover image reminded Retro Gamer's staff of the works (pictured above) of N.C. Wyeth.

Steve Purcell was also responsible the game's cover artwork. The preparation of the game's packaging involved Collette Michaud, Purcell's then-girlfriend and future wife. Although most packaging solutions for planned LucasArts products were conceived by the company's executive officers when the game's branding was devised, Purcell stated that the project leaders strongly promoted their own vision for the games' covers. Purcell specified that Gilbert requested a cover illustration resembling that of a classic book. Purcell's artist role on the first two Monkey Island games enabled him to readily identify the prospective cover's core visual elements. As with The Secret of Monkey Island, Purcell painted concept sketches to establish the basic design, intended to convey general ideas that he wanted to bring to completion rather than as fully formed illustrations. After Purcell delivered the paintings, LucasArts selected one and tasked him to "transfer the sketch to the board".

The final image for the cover was an oil painting by Purcell on a linen canvas. Purcell decided to "do it big – two by three feet", and he spent a month developing the artwork. Michaud posed in costume for the cover's depictions of Guybrush Threepwood and LeChuck, as Purcell's reference for the light distribution. According to Purcell, the cover's visuals were meant to show to players life-sized representations of the characters and setting, portrayed without the graphical limitations of the game.

The cover art has garnered a positive reception since the release, which Purcell said "makes all the effort worthwhile". Retro Gamer described it as reminiscent of an N.C. Wyeth book illustration. As of 2013, Purcell had the original painting in his office.

==== Art direction ====
There was no position of an art director at the time at LucasArts productions, in keeping with the company's small staff. The duties of lead artists were assigned to Peter Chan and Steve Purcell, designations that Chan, who debuted in video game development with this title, said to be perfunctory, as "for us, I think because it was so new, lead artist just meant the guy who was stuck doing most of the art". As the only returning head artist for Monkey Island 2, Purcell sought to ensure the overall visual consistency between its predecessor. A series of lengthy planning discussions guided the creation of the audiovisuals, which were fashioned to complement the plotline.

The game's artists and animators - as well as its composers - collaborated with LucasArts programmers to harness cinematic techniques such as scrolling panoramas and proportional character scaling. Less than a year after release, Dave Grossman described Monkey Island 2 as in part an "interactive cartoon", lending itself to "crazy and cartoony" interactive sequences. He cited a sequence of Largo LaGrande shaking Guybrush Threepwood upside-down to extort valuables from him: "People saved the game at that point so they could go back and watch it a few times." Peter Chan said that the artistic direction of Monkey Island 2 was already decided when he joined its team, making him focus on mimicking existing visual references, although he was allowed by the corporate culture of LucasArts at the time to improvise graphical elements.

In contrast, Ahern remained discontent with some of the animation, which he felt was uneven because of the animators' freedom to add stylistically disparate graphics assets without immediate supervision. He explained that "there was nobody officially art directing [the game] and coming in and saying, 'No, that character's off-model, or that needs to look more like this'". Ahern was frustrated with this situation, which he believed to be the source of a stylistic clash between the animated scenes. Resulting from this experience, when Ahern was appointed as an animator for Day of the Tentacle, he requested LucasArts for the authority to institute uniform art design criteria for that game, so as to facilitate a cohesive artistic process. Conversely, Grossman later said that Monkey Island 2's artwork – along with its music – imparted "a terrific sense of place" and a "tremendously cinematic" ambiance.

=== Music ===
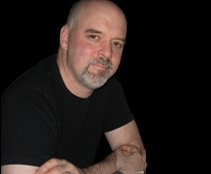
Composer Peter McConnell (2010 photograph) was among the developers of the iMUSE interactive music engine, introduced in Monkey Island 2: LeChuck's Revenge.

The score was composed together by Michael Land, his former college housemate Peter McConnell, and Land's high school friend Clint Bajakian, the last two newly hired by LucasArts. The game's music was developed on a Macintosh II computer using Digital Performer and turned into PC-compatible MIDI tracks via a dedicated sound program that McConnell had written as his first job at the company. To achieve a natural sound for the in-game music arrangements, the composers recorded their own performances over a MIDI keyboard and a music sequencer.

Land, McConnell and Bajakian split the scoring responsibilities between themselves equally, none titled as lead composer. McConnell likened their working dynamic to that of a professional band: they would occasionally switch who would write the music for which location, and created some of the tracks collaboratively. Like with Secret, Michael Land coordinated his contributions with Ron Gilbert, who nevertheless was largely disengaged from the music's development. After handing Land a general request to compose music driven by Calypso-inspired percussion, Gilbert refrained from further involvement, as he trusted Land's professional capabilities. Land remarked that "from the beginning of the game, I wanted the music to sound like what you'd hear coming out of a radio if you were walking down a street on a Caribbean Island".

Although leitmotifs were incorporated into the soundtrack, their use avoided emphasizing character themes that McConnell stated to be typical of film scores. Instead, he and his colleagues utilized the musical device to evoke a "pirate reggae" aesthetic across the individual compositions. The trio thus sought to establish a general thematic direction that disassociated the players' perception of the tracks from the characters. The composers only broke away from that paradigm with music related to major characters such as the Voodoo Lady.

==== iMUSE ====
Monkey Island 2: LeChuck's Revenge was the first LucasArts game to use Interactive Music Streaming Engine (iMUSE), the company's proprietary adaptive music engine. Co-designed by Land and McConnell, the technology stemmed from Land's disappointment with Secret's gameplay-music integration. By the time that McConnell was recruited by LucasArts, Land had envisioned an audio sequencing system that could vary the progression of a musical piece in an interactive environment. Land asked him to collaborate on this concept, and McConnell later commented that "we made a very good design team in realizing and expanding on this vision". The composers' reference for the iMUSE system was an imagined pit orchestra in a musical whose conductor closely observed the enactment of the play and could "direct virtuoso musicians to make smooth transitions to any place in the music at any time, in a way that is, well, musical".

The solution allowed the compositions to dynamically alter in response to the player's interaction with a given environment or situation. The iMUSE technology enabled adaptive music arrangements that adjusted to the events throughout the course of the story, as well as logical transitions from one track to another, and provided for several other sound engineering functionalities. Describing the total effect of these features, Gilbert commented that "the [score] starts at the beginning and ends at the end of the game, and is just one ever-evolving piece of music".

Land and McConnell spent nine months creating the iMUSE system's first incarnation, an integrated framework of audio drivers that governed the engine's various capabilities. McConnell recalled that LucasArts staff was initially confused as to the classification of the technology, whose subset programs and their associated MIDI track data "took up an entire floppy disk in a five-disk game". In reaction, McConnell and Land devised a name, iMUSE, for the system, and proceeded to explain their design to LucasArts personnel, which clarified the issue. McConnell remarked that, although he and Land were confident in the practicability of the iMUSE system during its inception, the composers found the application of its initial version to be very complicated. Bajakian cited major difficulties in ensuring that the encoded sound and music data were compatible with the available variety of sound cards. McConnell stated that the technology was required to undergo several iterations across five years from the release of Monkey Island 2 to become suitable for widespread use by LucasArts audio programmers. However, he noted that the core engine managed an average delivery of high-end audio performance during its host titles' gameplay, which helped to obscure the system's underlying complexity from the staff.

The iMUSE technology introduced a new way for LucasArts' designers to connect the players' actions and the background music, the company's 2008 general manager Kelly Flock stated in an interview that year. He noted that, in past adventure games, entering a location triggered a looping unchanging composition which was divorced from player-driven events in the scene. According to Flock, Land and McConnell's system contrasted this trend by accounting for how often a player would visit an in-game area and what they would do there, and in response the engine would alter the music to suit the gameplay circumstances and apply appropriate sound effects. Flock stated that Land was able to build up suspense with aural manipulations, which previous LucasArts products did not do. In commercializing the iMUSE system, LucasArts chose not to license it to competing companies, and instead patented it for internal use, which led it to become a commonplace feature of SCUMM-based adventure games. Flock summarized that Land and McConnell's work was critical to the design of the ambiance in those titles and labeled it as "probably the single most important technology that was developed [at LucasArts]".

== Special edition ==
One of the changes for the Special Edition (bottom) from the original (top) is the updated high-definition graphics.

LucasArts released in 2010 a remake with updated audiovisuals titled Monkey Island 2: Special Edition, after doing the same with The Secret of Monkey Island: it includes updated graphics, updated high-quality audio engine, new voice-overs, additional content such as concept art, and an in-game hint system. Players can switch from the updated version into the original at any time, with an option to retain the voice-overs of the remake. Players can opt to use the original point-and-click control scheme, or can directly control the movements of Guybrush using a control pad or similar device. The "lite" mode from the original game ("for game reviewers") has been omitted. Further, the original introductory sequence with the main musical theme has been removed, purportedly because it displayed credits for the original game, now outdated.

The remake was announced by LucasArts during their annual Game Developers Conference on March 10, 2010, with the original creators Ron Gilbert, Tim Schafer and Dave Grossman in attendance. The trio recorded a commentary track for the Special Edition that can be brought up in many locations, using silhouettes in the fashion of Mystery Science Theater 3000 overlaid on the graphics. Craig Derrick announced a new interface in the vein of The Curse of Monkey Island's and the return of the original voice cast, including Dominic Armato as Guybrush, Alexandra Boyd as Elaine, Earl Boen in his final performance as LeChuck, and Neil Ross as Wally. Phil LaMarr was also confirmed as Dread and Tom Kane as additional voices.

The special edition was released for the PlayStation 3, iPhone, iPod Touch, Microsoft Windows, and Xbox 360 in July 2010. The iOS version was retired in March 2015. The special editions of the first two Monkey Island games were later released physically for Xbox 360, PlayStation 3 and PC (exclusively in Europe) as Monkey Island Special Edition Collection.

=== Development ===
The production was overseen by Craig Derrick and his team at LucasArts, known internally as "Team 3", which also developed the remake of the first Monkey Island game. Derrick, a devoted enthusiast of the series, had sought to participate in the franchise since the start of his employment at LucasArts, who at the time were disinterested in adventure game development. This led Derrick to face difficulties in negotiating to recreate The Secret of Monkey Island with the company's management due to their uncertainty about the financial feasibility of LucasArts returning to the genre, whose popularity they assumed to be in decline. After the successful release of The Secret of Monkey Island: Special Edition in 2009, Derrick could readily convince LucasArts to remake Monkey Island 2.

The majority of staff from the first remaster was already occupied with another project when this decision was sanctioned. To compensate, LucasArts augmented the team for Monkey Island 2: Special Edition with staff from the company's foreign departments, and assigned the majority of the production to its Singapore division. To match the scope and complexity of the 1991 original, LucasArts leveraged more resources than for the previous remake.

The increased workload was eased by Derrick's colleagues' experience and technological solutions from The Secret of Monkey Island: Special Edition. He explained that these enabled an authentic recreation of Monkey Island 2 along with new features in the same timeframe as that of the first remake. The additions included in-game audio commentary by Gilbert, Schafer and Grossman, recorded at the 2010 Game Developers Conference. Derrick had planned to involve the designers for a similar commentary track for The Secret of Monkey Island: Special Edition, but was unable due to schedule conflicts. Commenting on the development being spread between LucasArts' San Francisco and Singapore departments, he mentioned that despite this causing some hurdles in the teams' collaboration, the Singapore division had been previously involved with The Secret of Monkey Island: Special Edition and thus was able to handle those issues.

Derrick commented that the result of this distributed process met his expectations. Prior to the release, Gilbert expressed satisfaction with the remake's rendition of the gameplay and technical elements of Monkey Island 2, and remarked that the ability to transition at will between the new and original audiovisuals "really showed the care, love, and respect that LucasArts has for these games".

== Reception ==
=== Sales ===
Monkey Island 2: LeChuck's Revenge was highly anticipated; Amiga Power called it the most eagerly awaited game of 1992. According to Ron Gilbert, Monkey Island 2 and its predecessor "sold well, but Sierra Online and King's Quest were still kicking our ass completely!" A writer for Next Generation said they had "relatively minor" success in the United States, but became blockbusters on the PC and the Amiga throughout Europe. Conversely, Edge reported that both games "sold very poorly on release". Designer Tim Schafer said that Monkey Island 2 sold about 25,000 copies, despite its being released at a time when LucasArts was "really excited if we sold 100,000 copies of a PC graphic adventure". Following the underperformance of Monkey Island 2, Schafer recalled that the management came and told them that Monkey was a failure and that they should make something else. He speculated that the Monkey Island series' reputation grew as a result of software piracy. According to Schafer, the pressure to develop a more commercially viable game ultimately led to the creation of Full Throttle, which became the first LucasArts adventure to sell one million units.

=== Reviews ===
Reception

Aggregate score
Aggregator	Score
GameRankings	90%

Monkey Island 2 received consistently high reviews for all versions, 95% from Amiga Computing for the Amiga version, 96% from Computer and Video Games for the PC version. When Kixx XL rereleased Monkey Island 2 as a budget game, the reviews remained high getting 91% from CU Amiga. The game is still considered very high quality with contemporary reviewers scoring it highly. Monkey Island 2 is often considered one of the greatest in the point-and-click genre, and it still stands up well against modern adventure game titles. The game holds a rating of 90% on the review aggregator site GameRankings.

Monkey Island 2: LeChuck's Revenge was rated highly for several reasons. The game is considered user friendly as it has a "lite" mode. This allowed beginners to use an easier setting. The overall difficulty of both modes is also considered to be good. The redesign in controls, such as the fewer verbs and graphical inventory were rated well as increasing the ease of use. Music in Monkey Island 2 was noted for its use of the iMUSE system. Reviewers noted that for the first time the sound is an integral part of the atmosphere. Graphically, the game was considered an improvement over its predecessor, with reviewers impressed. It is also noted by critics that the developers of Monkey Island 2 made using the Amiga version's 11 floppy disks relatively smooth, but also noted that installing on a hard drive is recommended.

In 1992 Computer Gaming World named it the year's best adventure game, praising its "challenging puzzles and wonderful sense of humor, along with a stunning visual presentation". In 1996, it ranked it as the 74th-best game of all time. In 1994, PC Gamer UK named Monkey Island 2 the fourth-best computer game of all time. The editors wrote that "anyone who claims to have an interest in adventuring cannot afford to be without this". In 1996, GamesMaster ranked it 29th on their "Top 100 Games of All Time". In 2011, Adventure Gamers named Monkey Island 2 the eighth-best adventure game ever released.

In a celebration of the series' 30th anniversary, Ron Gilbert shared secrets from its original source code during a video conversation with the Video Games History Foundation. These included early character prototypes, deleted scenes, unused animations and alternative game environments from the first two games.

=== Special Edition ===
The Special Edition was given a score of B+ by Gaming Bus; the site stated that there was more music and it was of higher quality, the graphics were improved, there was additional content, and the core game was still intact, though the hints were too helpful and there were some problems with controls.
