= Microplanner =

Microplanner may refer to:

- Micro-Planner (programming language), an artificial intelligence programming language of the 1970s, a subset implementation of Planner
- MicroPlanner X-Pert, a project management software package
