= Milkman Conspiracy =

Level from 2005 video game Psychonauts

The Milkman Conspiracy
- Psychonauts location
- The Milkman Conspiracy level
- First appearance: Psychonauts
- Created by: Tim Schafer; Scott Campbell; Peter Chan; Erik Robson

"Milkman Conspiracy" is a level in the 2005 video game Psychonauts. It is a world that takes place in the mind of Boyd Cooper, a paranoid security guard of an asylum, which the protagonist Raz explores. The area has unusual gravity, causing Raz to be pulled towards different roads when he is near and walking at unusual angles. Multiple games have been compared to this level, including Jazzpunk, We Happy Few, and Super Mario Galaxy.

The game's director, Tim Schafer, was responsible for the level concept and its dialogue. He decided to create a conspiracy-based level around "I am the milkman, my milk is delicious," a phrase made up by a staff member at Double Fine. Schafer found fascination with conspiracy theorists, trying to create comedy with mental illness without punching down at those with mental illnesses. Art director Scott Campbell wanted to emphasize the paranoia Boyd experiences, accomplishing this by adding G-Men and the feeling of being watched to the level. Concept artist Peter Chan depicted roads twisting in the sky, wanting to reflect how Boyd's logic and reason were twisted. Erik Robson, who handled game design, designed the level to resemble a traditional adventure game, having players collect items to solve puzzles.

"The Milkman Conspiracy" has been generally well-received, becoming a Psychonauts fan favorite. Game Revolution and The Escapist writers praised it as one of the best platform levels in gaming, while author Daniel Hardcastle called it one of the best areas in video games. Its world design was praised by Eurogamer staff, which felt it is what made the level stand out so much. It has received attention for its depiction of mental health, with author Alice Brumby discussing how Boyd's mind is the most "disordered" among Psychonauts' cast.

== Summary ==
"Milkman Conspiracy," like certain other areas in Psychonauts, takes place in the mind of a person, that of paranoid security guard Boyd Cooper. Boyd is tasked with guarding an asylum and makes frequent references to "the Milkman." The area in his mind is depicted as a suburban neighborhood where the roads are impossibly twisted and cameras can be found everywhere. As players control Raz through this world, the gravity may pull them to different paths and angles. The world is populated by G-Men, who watch protagonist Raz suspiciously while using tools incorrectly in an attempt to blend in while looking for someone called the Milkman. Players collect various tools to try to blend in with G-Men holding the same tools to gain access to more parts of the level. In addition to the G-Men, there is also the Rainbow Squirts, a group of girl scouts led by a woman called the Den Mother. Raz discovers that the G-Men wish to remove the Milkman from Boyd's mind, while the Rainbow Squirts were trying to keep him contained. The Milkman escapes, saying "I am the Milkman. My milk is delicious." and Raz is ejected from Boyd's mind. Boyd assumes the persona of the Milkman in reality before burning down the asylum with a Molotov cocktail. The world has various objects called Figments scattered throughout the area, representing different images such as lawn chairs and children.

== Concept and design ==
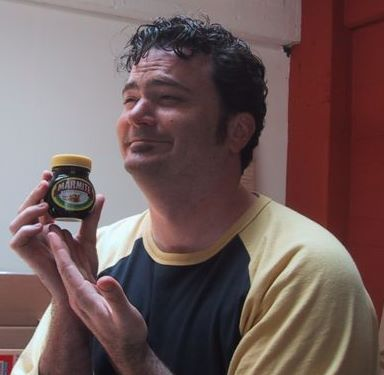
Psychonauts director and writer Tim Schafer was one of the level's creators.

The concept for "Milkman Conspiracy" first emerged when a staff member at the game's developer Double Fine came up with the phrase "I am the milkman, my milk is delicious." This line caused various ideas to converge for the game's director, Tim Schafer, leading him to create a conspiracy-focused level. Schafer held a fascination with conspiracy theorists, wanting to know "what was going on inside their heads." He found conspiracy theorists funny, though he also felt sad that people could be so easily misled by people on the Internet. He created a chart of conspiracies centered around the level's central character, Boyd Cooper, using various theories that Schafer had heard. These included famous real-life conspiracy theories, ones from movies, ones inspired by discussions at their office, and a homeless man who they paid to sweep the driveway. He cited the man and the conspiracies he believed as a particular inspiration for the level. While the level addressed mental illness in a comedic way, Schafer noted that he was not trying to mock people with mental illnesses, and wanted players to empathize with characters like Boyd.

Concept artwork by artist Peter Chan

Schafer went into it imagining the world as a giant spider-web surrounding Boyd's house, designed to evoke a "retro, [19]50s spy vibe" in a suburban neighborhood where things were not as they seemed. Art director Scott Campbell wanted paranoia to be a more prominent aspect of the level, which he accomplished by having eyes and binoculars come out of various objects and landmarks whenever players are looking away from them, to create the feeling of being watched. He was also responsible for the G-Men that are found throughout the level, basing them on "G-Man detectives" from the 1950s, as well as the Spy vs. Spy comics. Campbell specifically reminisced about the amusement he found with how conspicuous the Spy vs. Spy characters were with their outfits and behavior, giving the G-Men in "Milkman Conspiracy" a single object as a disguise, and making them use it in a blatantly incorrect fashion. Concept artist Peter Chan visualized the world as suburbia being "vaulted up against the sky," while the roads twisted in the air. He compared it to Boyd's logic and reason, which he described as twisted.

Schafer recruited Erik Robson as lead gameplay designer. Robson was determined to implement adventure-style gameplay, requiring players to use different objects to solve puzzles and blend in with the G-Men. The level grew larger than expected, due in part to the designers' use of gravity tech in the game. Robson felt that the level was too open, feeling that there should be fewer "ambient houses." He also wished that Boyd's "inner turmoil" was better expressed through the level. In discussing the themes of the level, he described its antagonists as "an immune system" responding to the presence of the Milkman in Boyd's mind, and that the Milkman can be "buried" but not eliminated, causing Boyd to feel paranoid about something bad happening because of it. He found the open-air maze and the sense of confusion well done, but wished that more was done to "drive that emotional point better." He felt it was not a standout level, but appreciated the writing and humor. After the designers and programmers finished with the level, Schafer began writing dialogue around what had been created. He originally wanted Erik Wolpaw to write the dialogue, but because Wolpaw was too busy, he did it himself. He wrote the G-Men's dialogue to be flat and nonsensical while having some thread of truth, and cited the line "rhubarb is a controversial pie flavor" as an example. He explained that this was based on rhubarb pie being poisonous if prepared incorrectly.

== Reception ==
"Milkman Conspiracy" has received generally positive reception, identified by multiple critics as a fan favorite of Psychonauts. It is regarded as the best level in the game by multiple critics, including author Daniel Hardcastle, PCGamer's Samuel Horti, Digital Spy staff, and Bitmob staff. Hardcastle specifically revered it as one of the medium's best. Horti praised the jokes in the level as its most memorable part, while Bitmob staff praised its dialogue as among the best written in video games. Game Revolution writer Ben Silverman regarded it as one of the best platforming levels and praised it for its creativity. GamesRadar+ staff called it brilliant, while GamesRadar+ writer Lucas Sullivan felt that it was unlike any other level in any video game. GamesRadar+ staff also included it on their list of 59 video game levels people should play, calling it a standout among standout levels in the game. They compared the design of the world to a combination of graphic artist M. C. Escher and filmmaker Tim Burton and praised the gameplay concepts employed. The Escapist writer Marty Sliva called it the "perfect platforming game level" and "one of the most unforgettable levels in video game history." Eurogamer writer Christian Donlan felt the level's "magic" came from its presentation and arrangement rather than the gameplay.

It has received discussion for its exploration of mental health. The Escapist writer Lara Crigger discussed it in their analysis of Psychonaut's exploration of insanity. Crigger talked about how the world's architecture and occupants reflect how Boyd is feeling as though he is being watched by people who wish to do him harm. Marty Sliva discussed how the nature of the level's world made players empathize with Boyd, as well as how the G-Men reflected Boyd's distrust in all of the people around him. Sliva also discussed how the game gives players the opportunity to empathize with Boyd and what he is going through, adding that the "tragic events" that lead Boyd to be the way he is makes it "even more heartbreaking." Author Alice Brumby described the world of Boyd's mind as the "most disordered" in Psychonauts. They discussed the central area, where Boyd is present, as the sanest place in his mind, and suggested that it represents Boyd's "ego" due to his presence there. They pointed out the twisted nature of the roads, which Brumby stated contrasted with the world of another Psychonauts character, Sasha Nein's level; where that level has no risk of falling, this level does. According to Brumby, this was due to the "disorientingly inconsistent gravity," which they described as representing a "formerly normal, healthy mind, and the difficulty and dangers of exploring it." The Gameological Society writer Joe Keiser called it the "first great example of game environment as characterization." They discussed how the cameras and G-Men reflect Boyd's feeling of being watched and how figments in Boyd's world represented people and objects which Boyd likely saw, but took no heed of due to his job. He discussed how they are used effectively to convey the "vestiges of sanity on the fringes of delusion."

Multiple games have been compared to "Milkman Conspiracy," including Jazzpunk, Hello Neighbor, and Super Mario Galaxy.
