= Peter Chan (artist) =

American concept artist and animator

- Occupations: Freelance concept and storyboard artist, animator
- Website: peterchanconceptart.com

Peter Chan is an American freelance concept and storyboard artist and animator for video games and films. Chan is best known for his work in several LucasArts adventure games, including Monkey Island 2: LeChuck's Revenge, Day of the Tentacle, Full Throttle, and Grim Fandango.

== Career ==
While in grade school, Peter Chan was inspired by a Star Wars magazine to pursue a career in concept art for films. After some work in the advertising industry in San Francisco, he joined LucasArts in 1991. Though Chan is credited on many of LucasArts' games, he considers that for most of these, he simply provided some assistance during his lunch hours to these other projects.

Chan's first major role was with Monkey Island 2: LeChuck's Revenge, where he developed the art assets based on the pre-defined character designs. For Day of the Tentacle, Chan worked as the lead background artist alongside lead character designer Larry Ahern. This was Chan's first opportunity to develop assets from scratch, and worked with Ahern to craft Looney Tunes-inspired characters and backgrounds, emulating those of Chuck Jones and Maurice Noble. LucasArts had had Jones visit their studio during development, and Jones was impressed with Chan's work and suggested he come work for Warner Bros., but Chan decided to remain at LucasArts. Chan continued as the lead artist for Full Throttle. At this point, around 1995, Chan decided to become a freelance artist, and moved from San Francisco to San Juan Island, Washington, but worked remotely with LucasArts as the backgrounds artist for Grim Fandango, using the opportunity to provide material for breaking into the film industry.

Chan had been set to help provide concept art for Tim Burton's Superman Lives, but the film was ultimately scrapped. Chan's first feature film as a concept artist was Antz, and worked as visual concept and storyboard artists for several other films, including Star Wars: Episode I – The Phantom Menace, Harry Potter and the Sorcerer's Stone, Lemony Snicket's A Series of Unfortunate Events, Rio, and Monsters University. Chan also continued to freelance for video games as character and concept artist, including for Sly Cooper and the Thievius Raccoonus from Sucker Punch Productions, Insecticide from Crackpot Entertainment (formed by Ahern), several Humongous Entertainment games (formed by former LucasArts lead Ron Gilbert), and many games from Double Fine Productions (formed by former LucasArts lead, Tim Schafer).
