= MicroPlanner X-Pert =

Micro Planner X-Pert
- Developer(s): Micro Planning International
- Stable release: 3.5 / November 19, 2007
- Operating system: Microsoft Windows
- Type: Project management software
- License: EULA
- Website: Micro Planning International Website

Micro Planner X-Pert (or X-Pert) is a project management software package in continuous development since 1979.

== Overview ==
X-Pert is geared to producing critical path method and PERT schedules for major, long-term projects (in one case a duration now approaching 40 years).

Developed by users and contributors to the ICL 1900 PERT mainframe package, X-Pert is one of the few packages still fully supporting the activity on arrow project network process.

PERT network chart for a seven-month project with five milestones (10 through 50) and six activities (A through F).

X-Pert supports the full cycle of project management – through multi-level work breakdown structure creation, transition to multiple projects using critical path diagrams and Gantt chart presentation.

X-Pert is available as Software as a Service (SaaS) running in the cloud, for a low monthly subscription

== History ==
At its first commercial release in 1980, Micro Planner was the first project management package for a micro computer.

First developed for the Apple II computer in 1979, versions have also existed at various times for the Apple ///, Sirius Systems Technology Victor, Macintosh, Silicon Graphics IRIX platforms, and currently for Microsoft Windows.

With the simultaneous release of Version 6 in 1988, for both Macintosh and Windows; Micro Planner became the first cross-platform project management solution for companies with a mixed hardware environment.

As of 2014 a 32-bit version for Windows and Mac OS X is under advanced development.

== Specifications ==
Max. No Operations per project:	15,000
Max. No Subprojects per project:	100
Max. No Operations per sub-project:	1,364
Max. No Resources:	500 per project 20 per operation
Max. No Work Breakdown Elements:	1,500
Max. No Calendars per project:	500
Flexible Time Units:	Weeks, Days, Shifts, Hours, Minutes
Number of Zones:	Zone Label (16 character) 500
Number of Responsibilities Label (16 character):	500
Number of Cost Label (16 character):	500
Sort Code (8 character):	Full positional select / sort
Link Types:	Finish-to-Start, Start-to-Start, Finish-to-Finish & Start-to-Finish
Import/Export file formats:	TEXT, DIF, CSV, XML & MPX (Import only)

== See also ==
- List of project management software
- Earned value management
- Program Evaluation and Review Technique
