= LucasArts adventure games =

Adventure games produced by LucasArts

The LucasArts "golden guy" logo, used during the company's adventure game golden years

From the late 1980s to the early 2000s, LucasArts was well known for their point-and-click graphic adventure games, nearly all of which got high scoring reviews at the time of their release. Their style tended towards the humorous, often irreverent or slapstick humor, with the exceptions of Loom and The Dig. Their game design philosophy was that the player should never die or reach a complete dead-end, although there were exceptions.

Many of the games shared similar game interfaces and technology, powered by SCUMM (Script Creation Utility for Maniac Mansion). After 1997, these games transitioned into 3D graphics with the GrimE game engine. Common features between the games include in-joke references to both other LucasArts games and Lucasfilm productions, as well as other running gags, such as Chuck the Plant and Sam & Max cameo appearances, that spanned numerous games. Most of the games were designed by the people with experience from creating preceding adventure games for LucasArts, and the same composers were involved in the majority of productions.

In 2004, after a string of titles that never reached release, LucasArts ceased development on graphic adventure games. Many of the development staff involved in the making of these games moved on to form new companies, continuing to produce similar games at studios such as Telltale Games, Double Fine Productions, and Autumn Moon Entertainment. In 2009, however, LucasArts made a collaboration with Telltale to revive the Monkey Island series, one of the old LucasArts adventure franchises, as well as stating its intent to revisit its past portfolio. This collaboration brought the LucasArts to develop special editions of the first two Monkey Island games and the Telltale helmed adventure game Tales of Monkey Island.

== Games ==
Release timeline
1986	Labyrinth
1987	Maniac Mansion
1988	Zak McKracken and the Alien Mindbenders
1989	Indiana Jones and the Last Crusade
1990	Loom
1990	The Secret of Monkey Island
1991	Monkey Island 2
1992	Indiana Jones and the Fate of Atlantis
1993	Day of the Tentacle
1993	Sam & Max Hit the Road
1994
1995	Full Throttle
1995	The Dig
1996
1997	The Curse of Monkey Island
1998	Grim Fandango
1999
2000	Escape from Monkey Island

=== Initial titles (1986–90) ===
LucasArts' first adventure game was the 1986 title Labyrinth. The game's development was led by David Fox, with contributions from Douglas Adams, Christopher Cerf, Noah Falstein and Brenda Laurel. Based on the film of the same name, it is LucasArts' first video game adaptation of a film. It is the only adventure game not published by LucasArts, as Labyrinth was published and distributed by Activision.

Maniac Mansion (1987) introduced SCUMM, the engine behind most of LucasArts' adventure games.

Labyrinth was followed in 1987 by Maniac Mansion. Maniac Mansion was the creation of Ron Gilbert and Gary Winnick, and marked the debut of SCUMM, the game engine that powered all but two of LucasArts later adventure games. The game was also the first LucasArts adventure game to be released for DOS. Maniac Mansion was LucasArts' first full graphic adventure game, using a point-and-click interface rather than the text-based gameplay seen in Labyrinth. A menu of verbs allows the player to choose how to interact with the game's environment. Maniac Mansion aims to parody the horror genre. The game was subject to several enhancements and re-releases, and was included as a game within a game in its sequel, Day of the Tentacle.

The third LucasArts adventure game was Zak McKracken and the Alien Mindbenders, designed by David Fox, Matthew Kane, David Spangler and Ron Gilbert. Set within a science fiction setting, the game was released in 1988. It used a slightly upgraded version of the SCUMM engine, but adopted the same control and gameplay methods of the earlier games. Zak McKracken and the Alien Mindbenders introduced digital music to LucasArts adventure games in the form of MIDI.

In 1989, LucasArts released their first adaptation of one of Lucasfilm's major franchises: Indiana Jones and the Last Crusade, based on the film of the same name. The game again upgraded the SCUMM engine's capabilities, but kept similar gameplay. The project was led by Ron Gilbert, David Fox and Noah Falstein; it was Fox's last adventure game for the company. A quotient point system, referred to as "Indy Quotient", allowed the player to overcome puzzles in several different ways, such as fighting a guard, sneaking past the guard, or convincing the guard to allow the player to pass.

Loom was the fourth game to utilize the SCUMM engine and was released in 1990. Designed by Brian Moriarty, the game was set in a fantasy setting. As well as updating the engine's graphics through the use of dithering, Loom marked a major deviation in interacting with the game's world. Instead of using the standard point-and-click interface of previous games, Loom requires players to use four-note musical tunes to create spells on objects or other characters. Loom also introduced the game design philosophy that the player character cannot reach a dead-end or die; this design decision was applied to all later adventure games, with the exception of Indiana Jones and the Fate of Atlantis. A later CD-ROM re-release added Red Book CD-DA music featuring the compositions of Pyotr Tchaikovsky and a full voice soundtrack (although, as a consequence of using Red Book CD-DA for the speech, the dialogue script had to be shortened considerably to fit on the CD-ROM).

=== The early nineties (1990–93) ===
The Secret of Monkey Island is the first game in the Monkey Island series and was released in 1990. The game, noted for its greater use of witty humor over previous titles, was designed by Ron Gilbert, Dave Grossman and Tim Schafer. The concept itself was pioneered by Gilbert. Following the deviation in gameplay in Loom, The Secret of Monkey Island returned to similar point-and click gameplay featured in Indiana Jones and the Last Crusade. The SCUMM engine was again upgraded for the title. Set in the Caribbean in the Golden Age of Piracy, the game introduced Guybrush Threepwood, a hapless amateur pirate. The game's MIDI music soundtrack was the first to feature work by Michael Land. The CD-ROM re-release added a new CD-audio music soundtrack, and updated the game's graphical user interface.

A sequel to The Secret of Monkey Island, Monkey Island 2: LeChuck's Revenge, followed in 1991. As with its predecessor, it was designed by Ron Gilbert, Dave Grossman and Tim Schafer, though it would be Gilbert's last work for LucasArts. The game once again placed the player in the position of Guybrush Threepwood, searching for a fabled treasure in the Caribbean. Gameplay remained mostly unchanged from The Secret of Monkey Island, though the game's user interface was simplified to be more user-friendly. LeChuck's Revenge again featured music by Michael Land, although Land was joined by Clint Bajakian and Peter McConnell. In addition, the game marked the debut of iMUSE (Interactive Music Streaming Engine), a system developed by Land and McConnell that allowed for the game's MIDI music to transition dynamically with the visuals.

The user interface was redesigned for Sam & Max Hit the Road (1993) to dedicate more space to visuals.

The 1992 title Indiana Jones and the Fate of Atlantis was the second LucasArts adventure game based on the Indiana Jones franchise. Unlike its predecessor, The Fate of Atlantis featured an entirely original storyline. The development was led by Hal Barwood and Noah Falstein, the latter of whom was one of the co-designers of The Last Crusade. The Fate of Atlantis was Falstein's last LucasArts project. The game incorporated the "Indy Quotient" system from The Last Crusade to allow the game to be completed in several ways. A 1993 CD-ROM re-release added a full voice soundtrack.

Day of the Tentacle is the sequel to the 1987 title Maniac Mansion. Released in 1993, it was designed by Tim Schafer and Dave Grossman and focused on saving humanity from a megalomanic mutant tentacle by using time travel. It was Grossman's last project for LucasArts before leaving in 1994. The game featured a further upgrade in the SCUMM engine to enhance the graphics capabilities. Day of the Tentacle's music was composed by Michael Land, Clint Bajakian and Peter McConnell, who composed the themes for the future, past and present settings of the game respectively. Day of the Tentacle was the first game to drop support for older, less successful platforms, instead initially releasing only for DOS and Mac OS. The game was one of the first video games to feature a full voice soundtrack upon its release.

Following the focus on the Maniac Mansion, Monkey Island and Indiana Jones franchises, LucasArts developed a game based on a different existing franchise in 1993 with Sam & Max Hit the Road. Designed by Sean Clark, Michael Stemmle, Steve Purcell and Collette Michaud, the game was based on comic book characters Sam and Max, which were created by Purcell. As with Day of the Tentacle, the game featured a full voice soundtrack upon release. The players' interaction with the game's environment was redesigned. Command functions were compressed into a number of cursor modes instead of having a list of verb actions to choose from on screen, and the inventory system was moved to an off-screen menu. The more streamlined interface allowed for more of the screen to be dedicated to gameplay. Land, Bajakian and McConnell returned to score the game's music. While Bajakian did not compose any further LucasArts adventure games, he was still involved with sound production in later titles. He is credited as both a music supervisor and one of four composers on Escape from Monkey Island.

=== Later SCUMM games (1995–97) ===
In 1995, after a year-long hiatus from adventure games, LucasArts released Full Throttle. Full Throttle was designed by Tim Schafer, and follows the story of Ben, a biker in a dystopian future who has been framed for murder. It was the first LucasArts adventure game to be released for Windows, although support for DOS was still retained. The game was the tenth to use the SCUMM engine, which had undergone further enhancements. The game kept a modified version of the streamlined interface used in Sam & Max Hit the Road, but introduced a contextual pie menu that dictated how players interacted with the game. Full Throttle featured technology called INSANE (Interactive Streaming Animation Engine) to assist with cut scene animation and the game's action sequences. The game's musical score was produced by Peter McConnell, and incorporated a title theme by The Gone Jackals. Full Throttle was the first LucasArts adventure game to be distributed only on CD-ROM.

The cartoon graphics of The Curse of Monkey Island (1997) marked the pinnacle of SCUMM development.

Later in 1995, The Dig was published. Production had started in 1989, but The Dig was plagued with development problems. The final version of the game was overseen by Sean Clark, although two previous versions had involved Noah Falstein, Brian Moriarty and Dave Grossman. The game's story itself was envisioned by Steven Spielberg, who had concluded that a film version would be prohibitively expensive. Spielberg's story focused on a group of astronauts becoming stranded on an alien world while on a mission to stop an asteroid hitting Earth. The Dig used the SCUMM engine and the INSANE technology. In addition, fellow Lucasfilm company Industrial Light & Magic was involved in the game's special effects. Michael Land composed the game's music, which included excerpts, many as short as one or two chords, from Richard Wagner's work.

The twelfth and final game to utilize SCUMM technology was the 1997 title The Curse of Monkey Island. The game was the third entry in the Monkey Island series, and the first not to involve series creator Ron Gilbert. Development was instead led by Jonathan Ackley and Larry Ahern. For its final outing, the SCUMM engine was completely overhauled to produce significantly more advanced graphics than any previous LucasArts adventure game. The resulting distinct cartoon style was created by artist Bill Tiller. The Curse of Monkey Island featured slightly refined gameplay based on the pie menu interface used in Full Throttle. The character of Guybrush Threepwood returns, with a voice actor for the first time in the series, in an effort to save his fiancée from a voodoo curse. Michael Land once again composed the game's score. The Curse of Monkey Island would mark the end of support for DOS; the game was released on CD-ROM solely for Windows.

=== 3D graphics and GrimE (1998–2000) ===
Grim Fandango (1998) introduced 3D graphics in the form of the GrimE engine.

For the 1998 title Grim Fandango, LucasArts retired the SCUMM engine in favor of a new 3D engine. The GrimE (Grim Engine) technology was created, using the Sith engine as a base and coded using Lua. The new engine resulted in a redesign in control and gameplay: instead of using point-and-click mechanics, the player uses the keyboard or a gamepad to interact with the game. Full-motion video cut scenes are used to advance the plot, stylized to be nearly indistinguishable from the in-game backgrounds. GrimE was also a true 3D engine: characters are collections of 3D-rendered polygons.

Grim Fandango was created by Tim Schafer, his final work for LucasArts. The game follows the tale of Manny Calavera, a travel agent in the Land of the Dead, as he becomes embroiled in a web of crime and corruption. As well as drawing inspiration from Aztec concepts of the afterlife, Grim Fandango is strongly rooted in film noir tradition. Peter McConnell composed the musical score; as with Schafer, this was McConnell's last LucasArts project. As with The Curse of Monkey Island, the game was only released for Windows.

The second title to use GrimE and the final original LucasArts adventure game to be released was Escape from Monkey Island. Released in 2000, the game is the fourth installment in the Monkey Island series. The game's development was led by Sean Clark and Michael Stemmle. The GrimE technology was slightly modified for the game, although Escape from Monkey Island was in most respects similar to Grim Fandango in both graphics and gameplay. Escape from Monkey again follows Guybrush Threepwood, this time attempting to deal with an Australian land developer attempting to eradicate piracy through a voodoo talisman. The game's music was created by five different composers: Michael Land, a different composer coincidentally named Michael Land, Bajakian, McConnell, and Anna Karney. In addition to the Windows version, support was added for Mac OS 9 and a PlayStation 2 version was released in 2001.

=== Special editions and remakes (2009–2017) ===
The Secret of Monkey Island: Special Edition (2009) updated the original game with high resolution artwork.

In July 2009, LucasArts released an enhanced remake of the 1990 title The Secret of Monkey Island, with the intent of bringing the old game to a new audience. According to LucasArts, this was "just the start of LucasArts' new mission to revitalize its deep portfolio of beloved gaming franchises". Described by British journalist John Walker as a "cautious toe in the water" for LucasArts, the move was prompted by LucasArts president Darrell Rodriguez, who had assumed the post only two months prior. According to Walker, many LucasArts employees had grown up playing the games from the 1990s, suggesting that should the renewed endeavour be successful, the developers would be keen to continue with further adventure titles.

The Secret of Monkey Island: Special Edition ran in an engine updated for high definition graphics that utilized the original game's resources, including the original SCUMM scripts. The special edition featured new high definition art and music played by a live orchestra. The original DOS CD version of the game was playable at any time with the press of a button.

Following the success of the first special edition, LucasArts released the sequel, Monkey Island 2 Special Edition, in the summer of 2010. Like the original special edition, the second special edition used an updated engine that supported high resolution graphics, and utilized the original game's resource files. This time, since the game used the iMUSE system, the engine had to be modified to run the new live orchestra music in various arrangements that simulated the shift in tone and pitch from scene to scene that iMUSE performed on the original MIDI music. The second special edition featured a change in control scheme as well as a change in art direction due to criticism of the first special edition.

Double Fine Productions released remasters of Grim Fandango in 2015, Day of the Tentacle in 2016, and Full Throttle in 2017.

== Canceled projects ==
Following the release of Escape from Monkey Island in 2000, LucasArts put three further adventure games into development, but all three were later canceled. The first of these was Full Throttle: Payback, a sequel to Full Throttle that began production in early 2000. Tim Schafer, the original creator of Full Throttle, was not involved in the project. Instead, development was led by Larry Ahern and Bill Tiller, who had both worked on The Curse of Monkey Island. In the early stages, the project received positive feedback from other LucasArts employees. According to Tiller, however, Payback eventually fell apart because of disagreements over the game's style between the development team and "a particularly influential person" within the management division. Production ceased in November 2000, when a quarter of the levels and about 40 percent of the preproduction art were complete. Ahern and Tiller both left LucasArts in 2001.

Another Full Throttle sequel began production in 2002. Entitled Full Throttle: Hell on Wheels, the game was to be for the PlayStation 2 and Xbox consoles. In contrast to the original Full Throttle, Hell on Wheels was to be an action-adventure game. Development was headed by Sean Clark, his last work for the company. Hell on Wheels was showcased at the 2003 Electronic Entertainment Expo (E3), where a playable demonstration and a teaser trailer were displayed. Despite this, LucasArts halted production in late 2003. Commentators cited poor graphics compared to other action-adventures of the time and Schafer's lack of involvement in the project as possible reasons for the decision. Additionally, Roy Conrad, the voice actor of the game's protagonist, had died in 2002.

The final attempt by LucasArts to develop an original adventure game was Sam & Max: Freelance Police, a sequel to the 1993 title Sam & Max Hit the Road. The game was announced for Windows in 2002 as a counterpart to Hell on Wheels. Michael Stemmle, one of the co-designers for Sam & Max Hit the Road, was the lead designer for the project. Series creator Steve Purcell, who had left LucasArts in 1997, worked as an advisor for the development team. Freelance Police was displayed alongside Hell on Wheels at the 2003 E3 convention, where the game's trailer was revealed. Although development appeared to be proceeding smoothly, Freelance Police was abruptly canceled in early 2004, just a few weeks before the game's marketing campaign was about to begin. LucasArts cited "current market place realities and underlying economic considerations" as the reasons for their decision. Commentators, however, felt that the move was representative of a perceived decline in the adventure game genre, and that LucasArts was moving to maintain its position with low business risk Star Wars-themed titles instead of the high risk graphic adventure games that had brought success in earlier years. LucasArts subsequently dismissed many of the designers involved with developing their adventure games, and in 2006 LucasArts president Jim Ward stated that the company may return to developing adventure games in 2015, effectively ending their adventure game era.

== Design philosophy ==
According to LucasArts' game design philosophy, their adventure games would not contain dead ends nor player death, unlike the majority of early adventure games such as those of Sierra. Their explanation is that the player should be entertained, focusing on story and exploration, instead of being excessively punished for mistakes or frustrated by trial and error.

In 1989, after designing Maniac Mansion, Ron Gilbert wrote an article titled "Why Adventure Games Suck: And What We Can Do About It" outlining what he perceived to be design flaws in adventure games of the time.

The first game to adopt the design philosophy was Loom. After designer Brian Moriarty learned that players tended to list as their favourite Infocom games those they had completed, he designed Loom so that it would be impossible to lose. After Loom this rule was broken by Fate of Atlantis, as the designers felt that player death was necessary to create tension, which was required for an Indiana Jones story.

== Games related to LucasArts adventures by descendant companies ==
As various designers left LucasArts, new companies were created to produce adventure games in similar styles to those created by LucasArts. Monkey Island creator Ron Gilbert, who left LucasArts after the completion of LeChuck's Revenge, went on to found Humongous Entertainment, in 1992. The company was primarily a children's game developer, but they also developed titles aimed at more mature audiences under the Cavedog Entertainment label. Humongous created several series of point-and-click adventure games aimed at children, all of which used SCUMM until 2003.

In the aftermath of Freelance Police's cancellation in 2004, LucasArts dismissed many of their designers who worked on adventure games. Most of the Freelance Police development team, including Brendan Q. Ferguson, Dave Grossman and Chuck Jordan, formed Telltale Games in 2005, to continue the development of graphic adventures. Michael Stemmle, the lead designer of Freelance Police, joined the company in 2008. In 2005, LucasArts' license with Steve Purcell concerning the Sam & Max franchise expired. Purcell, who had left LucasArts in 1997, moved the franchise to Telltale Games. The company subsequently released Sam & Max Save the World in episodic fashion from late 2006 to early 2007. A second run of Sam & Max games, Sam & Max Beyond Time and Space, was released across late 2007 and early 2008. The third Sam & Max season The Devil's Playhouse was released in 2010. In 2009, LucasArts began a collaboration with Telltale Games to create a new series of episodic adventure games, Tales of Monkey Island. Development of this project was led by Dave Grossman, with Michael Stemmle assisting with design and story production. The development team also included members with past experience from both The Curse of Monkey Island and Escape from Monkey Island. In addition, series creator Ron Gilbert was involved in the early design of the project. Sam and Max were also included in the casual poker games developed by Telltale Games, Poker Night at the Inventory, released in 2010, and its sequel, Poker Night 2, released in 2013. The company has gone on to develop other episodic adventure games from licensed properties, reaching critical success with their series of The Walking Dead games.

Tim Schafer, the creator of Full Throttle and Grim Fandango, left LucasArts at the beginning of 2000 to found Double Fine Productions. Among their games include The Cave, a game designed by Gilbert and developed by Double Fine, inspired by the multiple-character approach of Maniac Mansion, and Broken Age, a point-and-click adventure game financed by crowdfunding through Kickstarter, one of the first games demonstrating this as a viable mechanism for game development. Double Fine has been able to engage in acquiring the rights to the LucasArts games for making remasters. To date, they have released Grim Fandango Remastered (2015), Day of the Tentacle Remastered (2016), and Full Throttle Remastered (2017).

Gilbert worked with Winnick, Fox and Ferrari to develop Thimbleweed Park, which was released at the end of March 2017. The game, also funded through Kickstarter, was designed as an homage to the early LucasArts adventures mimicking the original 8-bit style interface. Gilbert also directed a sixth game in the Monkey Island series, Return to Monkey Island, which was released in September 2022.

== Legacy ==
The influence of LucasArts adventure games permeates the genre. Per PopMatters: "Everything from Telltale's games, Double Fine's Broken Age, and the Wadjet Eye Games publishing catalog all owe their existence to the golden age LucasArts style." PCZ credits them as having "fixed" adventure games which previously were rife with unforgiving design such as unforeseeable deaths and unwinnable situations, with The Secret of Monkey Island in particular having "changed everything".

Numerous people in the video game industry expressed their appreciation for the games the week of LucasArts' closure in 2013 under Disney. The article gathering their statements characterized the games as still "among our pinnacle achievements as an industry". Praise was directed at their creativity, humor, storytelling and accessible gameplay; Chris Charla of Microsoft Studios said "it seems like every single person in the game industry has played them", with designers being able to simply reference an element of the games when pitching a concept.

ScummVM is an open source emulator originally designed to play SCUMM-based games but has since expanded to play numerous other adventure games based on other commercial game engines. ScummVM was originally created in 2001 through cleanroom reverse engineering of the SCUMM engine, and since then has been expanded to include most of the additional side engines like iMUSE as well as support for the three-dimensionally rendered games, originally part of ResidualVM but now merged into the main ScummVM branch.

Aric Wilmunder, one of the co-creators of the SCUMM engine, had taken some of the original design documents for the LucasArts games when he left the company. Sometime later, he decided to return these back to LucasArts, but the company suggested that since Wilmunder had kept his copies safe for years, that Wilmunder keep the whole set of documents together. Wilmunder has subsequently been working with an archivist at Stanford to preserve all the documents and potential donation to a museum, while scanning all of the documents and providing these on the Internet, along with transcribing the source code for SCUMM to GitHub.

== See also ==
- List of graphic adventure games
- Sierra Entertainment
- Telltale Games
