= Music of Grim Fandango =

1998 Grim Fandango video game music by Peter McConnell

Grim Fandango soundtrack

Soundtrack album of Grim Fandango by Peter McConnell
- Released: 1998
- Recorded: San Francisco, 1997–1998
- Genres: Big band, bebop
- Length: 43:37 (stand-alone CD release); 3 hours (in-game soundtrack)
- Label: LucasArts
- Producer: Peter McConnell

The music for the video game Grim Fandango was composed and produced by Peter McConnell and published by LucasArts in 1998. The soundtrack is a mix of South American folk music, jazz, swing and big band sounds, for the game story filled with adventure and intrigue set in a unique combination of film noir and Mexican folklore's Day of the Dead. The soundtrack garnered critical acclaim and remained subject of positive reviews and inclusion in critics' rankings for the two decades after its first release. The soundtrack was praised both as a stand-alone musical experience, as well as for its outstanding contribution to the overall game experience; capturing the spirit of the game, "gluing" the story together, and becoming "integral" to the success of the game.

A Compact disc (CD) soundtrack was released simultaneously with the game in 1998. The soundtrack was remastered and orchestrated, and re-released in 2015. In 2018, celebrating its 20th anniversary, it was also released in vinyl format.

The score was awarded GameSpot's 1998 "Best PC Music Award". It was also nominated for the Academy of Interactive Arts & Sciences' "Outstanding Achievement in Sound and Music". Years after its original release, the soundtrack has also been included in lists of all-time best video game soundtracks.

== Background and context ==
=== The game ===
Grim Fandango is a graphic adventure video game directed by Tim Schafer and released by LucasArts in 1998. Set in the Mexican folklore's Land of the Dead and with a strong film noir twist, the story follows Department of Death's travel agent Manny Calavera who acts as a guide for recently departed souls as they travel through the Land of the Dead on their way to their final destinations. This land, meant to be only a place of passage to the final heavenly destination, has been settled by undeserving souls turning it into a land full of film noir-inspired crime and corruption, and making the travel of many departed souls more difficult and treacherous. The player follows Manny on a mission to save Mercedes "Meche" Colomar, a good soul thrust into and trapped in this corrupted world.

The game is one of the most acclaimed adventure games of all time, considered the last great adventure game to be released during the golden age of the adventure game genre. While composer Peter McConnell himself credits the outstanding directorial work of Tim Schafer, critics emphasized that one of the key components in the excellence of the game was McConnell's outstanding soundtrack.

=== Team and collaborations ===
Tim Schafer, Peter McConnell and other members of the development team had had long and overlapping careers from previous projects at LucasArts. For McConnell, who had joined LucasArts at the urging of Michael Land, another acclaimed composer of LucasArts, that included working on the music of other notable computer games, including Monkey Island 2: LeChuck's Revenge (1991), Indiana Jones and the Fate of Atlantis (1992), Sam & Max Hit the Road (1993), Day of the Tentacle (1993), Full Throttle (1995).

In composing for Grim Fandango, McConnell benefitted from having been a big jazz and film noir fan since his college time. He had his first experience in composing jazz in his work for Monkey Island; a team of composers (Michael Land, Clint Bajakian, and McConnell) split their work by the several islands in which the story of the game was set, and within McConnell's island (named Booty), he experimented with clarinet sounds.

McConnell and Schafer's professional collaboration started with Day of the Tentacle, then continued with Full Throttle (possibly in part due to McConnell having a rock band at the time, which suited the genre of the game). However, it was with Grim Fandango that the relationship between the two became very close and set the stage for numerous subsequent collaborations, with McConnell becoming Schafer's "go-to man". After both of them departed LucasArts, they collaborated on titles including Psychonauts (2005), Brütal Legend (2009), and Broken Age (2015).

== Original development ==
=== Inspiration and influences ===
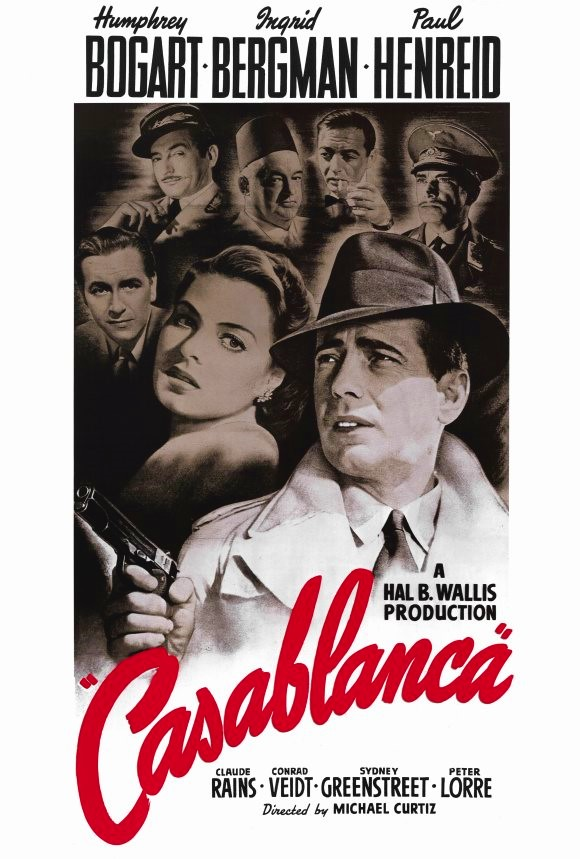
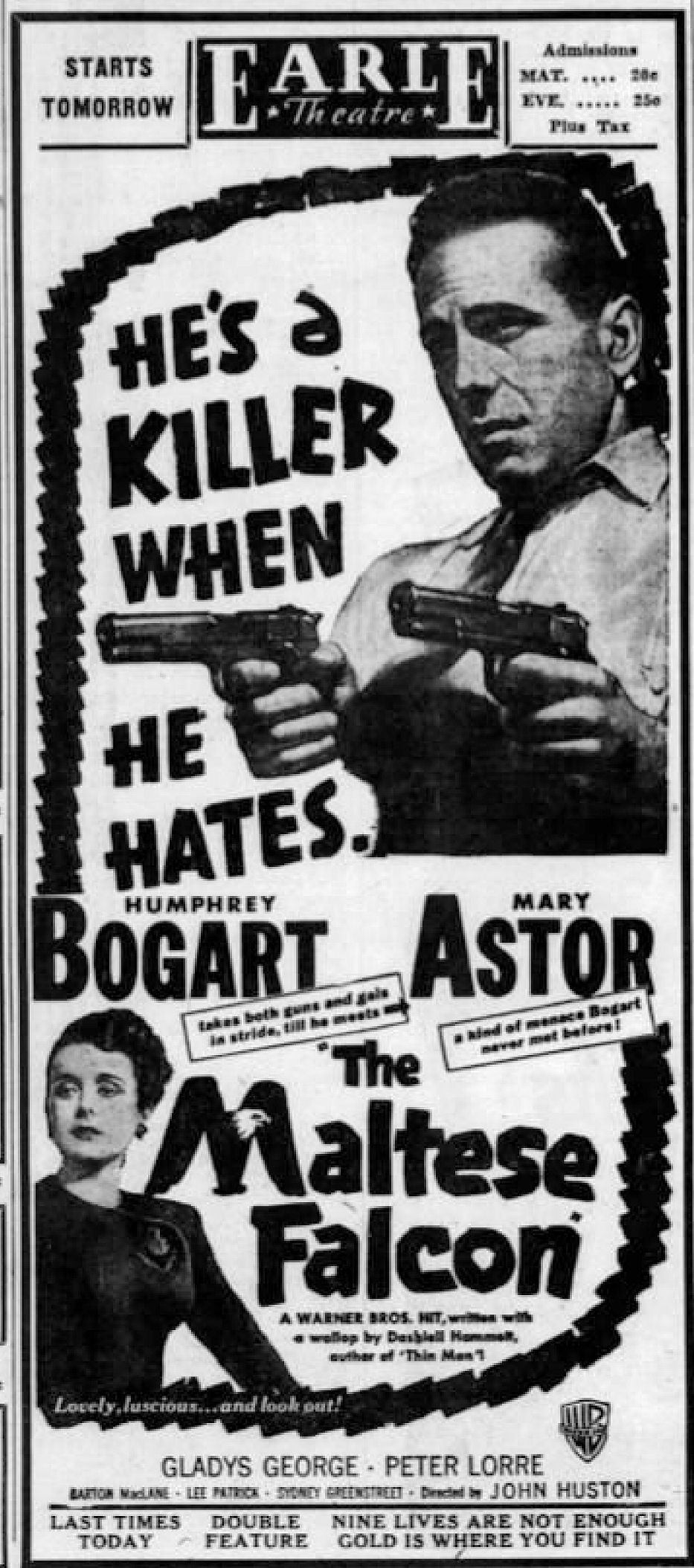
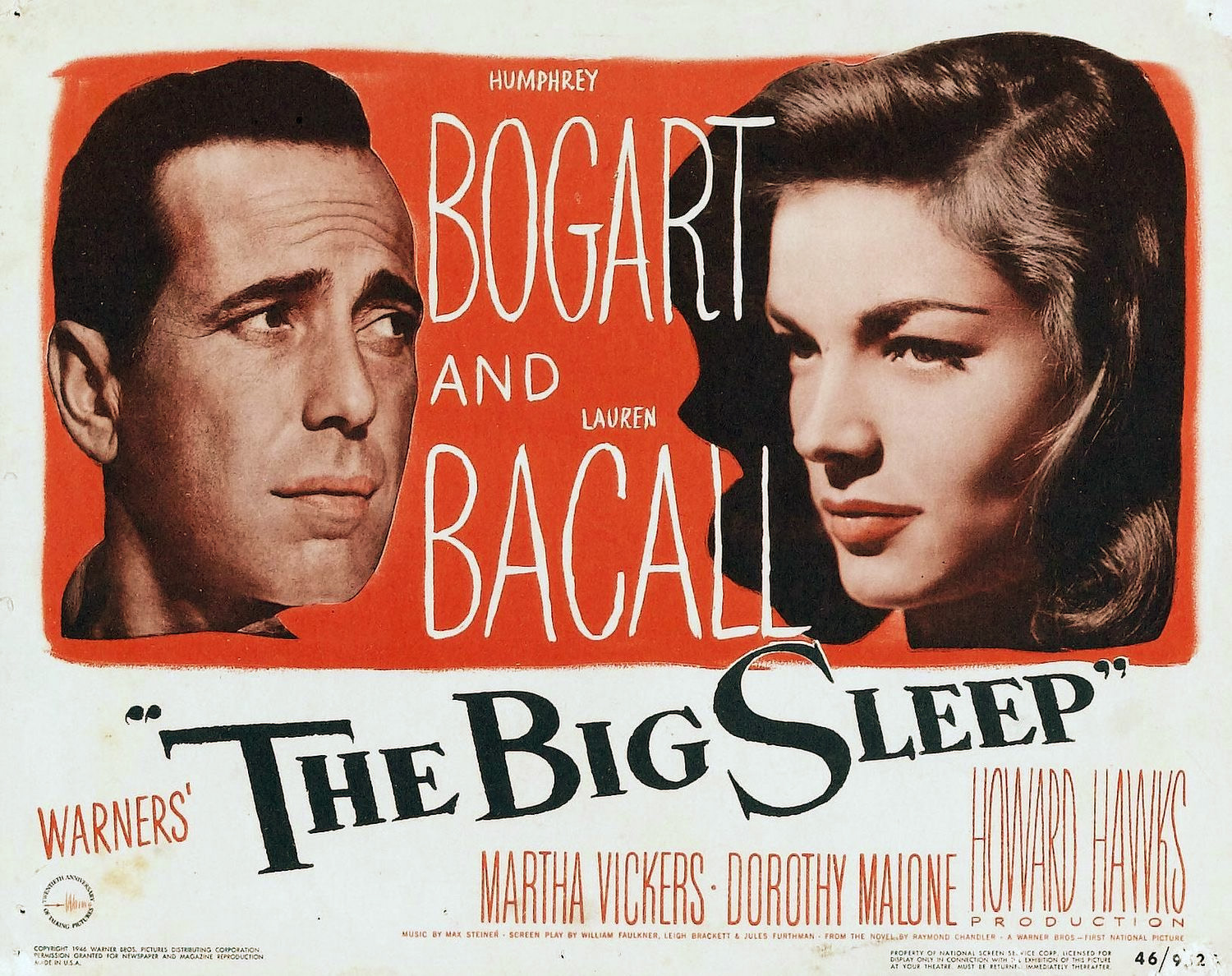
Casablanca, The Maltese Falcon and The Treasure of Sierra Madre were noir films that inspired the Grim Fandango soundtrack.

Very early in the process, project leader and writer Tim Schafer handed to McConnell black and white concept art of the characters sketched by Peter Chan, his collection of Humphrey Bogart films, and some vinyl records of a type Mexican folk music called Son, which McConnell described as "very raw, using crude folk instruments" that included hand percussion, violins, and charangos.

Having Schafer established the mood and tone of the project, McConnell said that aside from the listening material, Schafer did not give him much direction: "In my experience, Tim leads more by inspiring than by directing".

When years later McConnell was asked how he reacted when he first played the game, he said that "some games just really strike you when you first see the main character in the game environment. You think, 'Wow, this is something really different'. I remember feeling that when I first saw Manny walking around in Rubacava: 'A walking skeleton? Cool! And in this dark wet street like something from a different time, yet colorful and beautiful'".

McConnell also noted how the game's mélange of themes was musically very "potent" as it brought together diverse music styles, including folk, noir jazz, and classic underscore. To him, the whole game felt very inspirational, as dialogue, story, and the puzzles all worked together as an "opera"; "one big cohesive flow of music and voice" that made it special to score.

Of the films provided by Schafer, McConnell focussed his attention in The Maltese Falcon, The Big Sleep, Treasure of the Sierra Madre, and Casablanca; The first one scored by Adolph Deutsch and the other three by Max Steiner. He watched them "about a hundred times", and for the latter two being able to get copies of their scores from the Warner Brothers archives. He also acknowledged the influence of the films Glengarry Glen Ross and The City of Lost Children, the latter a French sci-fi/fantasy movie that informed the oceanic part of the game.

Notes of a charango. McConnell chose to use the charango in the score in part after Tim Schafer's brother had brought one from Mexico. The charango was traditionally made of an Armadillo shell, and which McConnell saw as being acoustically similar to a mandolin, but with an "earthier, more delicate, and haunting sound".

One South American record that was influential was a Peruvian-style record by Gustavo Santaolalla titled Ronrocco released at the time, that made heavy use of charangos. It also coincided with Tim Schafer's brother having brought one such instrument from a trip to Mexico. All this led to McConnell eventually incorporating the charango as one of the unique sounds of the score, along with the Andean flutes quena and tarka. Despite the strong Latin American influences and themes, McConnell decided to not attempt to compose a particularly ethnic score, but to be "organic" and to "evoke a texture that was real".

Grim came at the perfect time: the swing revival was taking off in those days with bands like Big Bad Voodoo Daddy and Squirrel Nut Zippers, and the Day of the Dead was just entering pop culture. In the Mission District in San Francisco, you could go to a club like Bruno’s and hear hot new swing bands like The Red Hot Skillet Lickers mix original sounds with old standards, then duck around the corner to a taqueria and hear a mariachi band play, and on the Day of the Dead there would be a huge parade at night. Almost every musician in the original Grim Fandango score, from the brass to the mariachi players to the Peruvian flutist, played in or came from the Mission District.

— Peter McConnell, 2015

McConnell explained how, since his college days, Duke Ellington had been a "huge influence" for him and kept a headshot in his office studio at LucasArts. For this project, McConnell listened to Ellington's opus copiously. Finally, for ocean-related music, McConnell read scores of several Debussy works.

Time and place had an important influence as well; McConnell was drawn to and inspired by the vibrant and diverse culture (musical and otherwise) of the San Francisco Mission District, which he called the "crown jewel" of the city that included rock clubs, jazz clubs, taquerias with mariachis bands, and Mexican folklore.

=== Composition process ===
When later interviewed, McConnell noted his satisfaction of being given ample lead time to compose and produce the score; he first began to work on the project in early 1997, about a year and a half before the game's release. He developed three types of musical pieces: event-triggered episodes, ambient pieces, and underscoring for cutscenes. Tim Schafer's guidance and the cultures that shaped the game were the basis for the composition.

One special occasion was our hijacking Tim [Schafer] and leading him to the recording studio where a bunch of us improvised on bongos, tin whistles and shakers while he talked through the story and its meaning, like a beatnik poetry reading.

— Clint Bajakian, 2015

In order to create a soundtrack that would follow the story of the game and mesh with the different settings within it, McConnell and his team created a digital interface system of little buttons that represented places in the game as a way to visually represent the score. They then recorded Schafer talking about the game and turned it into little snippets assigned to those plot points. Each point could then be clicked and hear Schafer's explanations of it. This was done using LucasArts iMUSE proprietary adaptive music system that McConnell himself had co-created with Michael Land a few years earlier.

McConnell would then come up with a theme by humming a tune, record it in a cassette, play it back to Schafer, and eventually replace the plot points narration with those tunes. Then they developed a MIDI score to serve as a "mock-up", leading to the recording of the final score that would include live musicians for some parts.

Rather than fully develop each piece one at a time, his approach was to create a short sketch for each situation in the game of about fifteen seconds long and then move on as soon as he felt he had hit the target and gotten the gist of the mood. This allowed him to be more productive, as it was easier and less stressful to later on in the process develop full pieces based on already existing sketches, instead of rushing to develop completely novel compositions from scratch as the completion deadline neared. At his peak rate, he noted that there were weeks during which he composed as much as two minutes of finished music a day, which he considered a "heavy regimen".

McConnell used the limited MIDI composition palette of the time, a couple of EMU E4 samplers (with 128 MB of RAM each), a Roland GMIDI Sound Canvas, and one or two other sound modules.

=== Themes and recording ===
McConnell went on to compose and produce Grim Fandango's original soundtrack, which combined an orchestral score, South American (Peruvian and Mexican) folk music, swing jazz from the noir era, jazz from other periods, bebop, and big band music. It also included some elements from traditional Russian, Celtic, Mexican, Spanish, and Indian strings cultures. In the original production, the orchestral elements of the score were digitally synthesized due to the common budgetary and technological limitations on gaming audio of the time. On the other hand, the jazz parts were recorded live, something uncommon at the time.

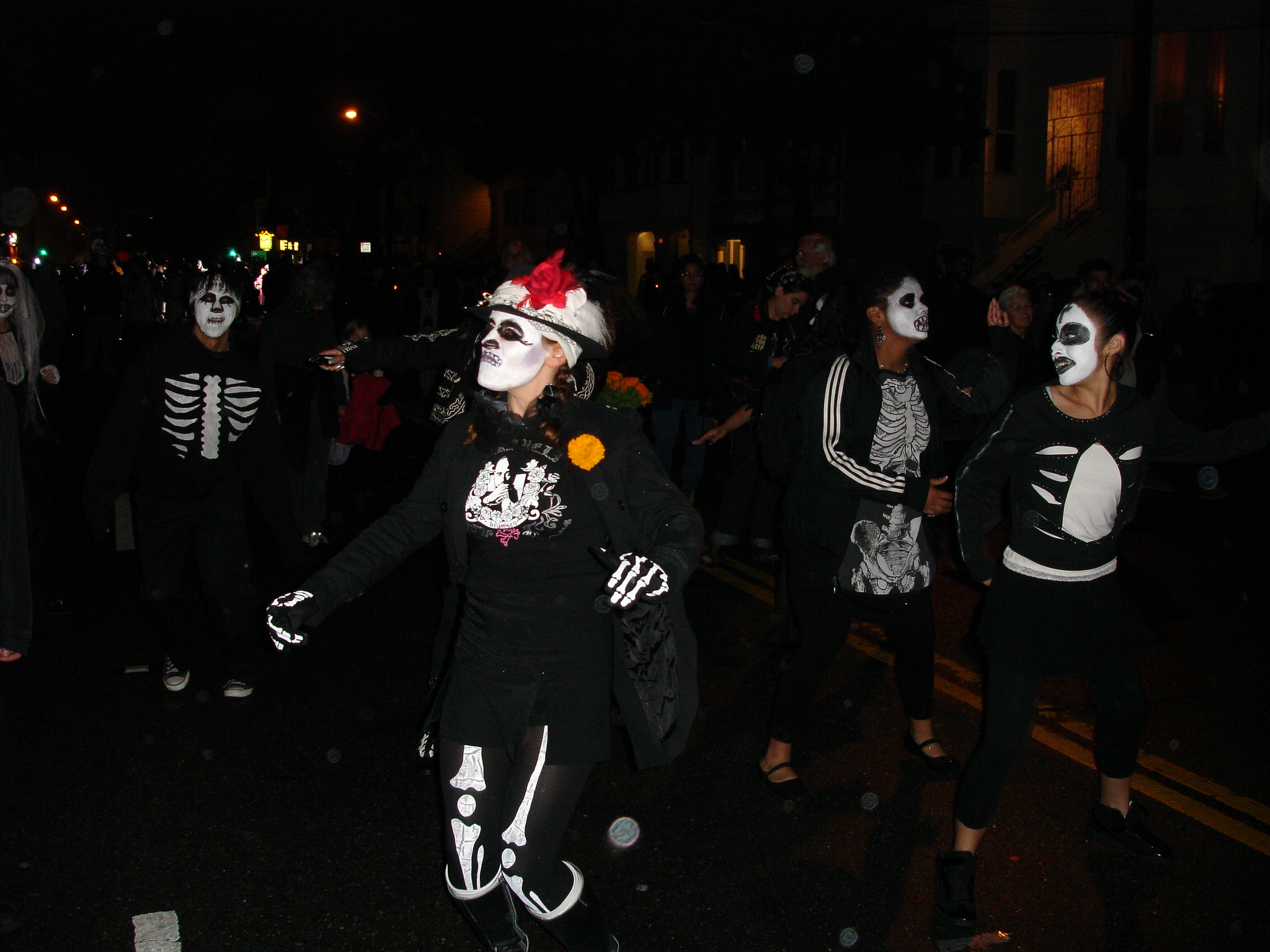
Day of the Dead (Dia de los Muertos) procession in San Francisco in 2006. This procession is part of the Mexican folklore that can be found in the Mission district of San Francisco, and that imbued the spirit of the game and soundtrack.

McConnell understood that the game's atmosphere brought together a noir story that was familiar to the Anglo-American audience, with a Latin culture that may have been less familiar. He developed the jazz score to be most recognizable, taking the culturally specific part (the Latin jazz and the Latin folk music) and weaving it into the score ("taking it for granted rather than pointing it up") with the goal of naturally leading the audience from their comfort zone and then make an "unfamiliar world more familiar".

An example of the rich atmospheric goals of the music is recounted by the French online publication Gameblog, that described the "Mr. Frustration" track as "sometimes bebop, sometimes melancholic, sweet or sensual" and observing that "whether led by a saxophone, a trumpet or a guitar, jazz is the predominant style of the Grim Fandango soundtrack, all reminiscent of the snug atmosphere of casinos and bars between the two world wars". It also described "Lost Souls' Alliance", with its rhythmic arrangement and the use of an Andean flute, as evoking a feel of Hispanic music, with the tremolo baritone guitar reminiscent of the Western: "a little 'rockabilly ballad' that makes us travel instantly to this corner of the planet and to that period, at the beginning of the twentieth century".

More than any other project that I've worked on, it's the most like an opera. The music is so integrated into the story, it's so present in the story, and it is so much part of the shape and direction of the story. [...] You're experiencing the whole story of the game in your imagination.

— Peter McConnell, 2015

Especially given the disparate themes of Grim Fandango, McConnell kept the score cohesive by building it on a "backbone" of classic Max Steiner-style orchestral underscoring. The orchestral part was digitally created, as the team did not consider doing live orchestra because at the time "games didn't occupy a place in the culture that could obtain that level of production".

To make the digital pieces sound more "organic" and "not quantized" and orchestra-like, McConnell tried to be "very free with the tempo" so even though he was using a sequencer, it would sound like the conductor was watching the sequences of the game during the performance, following the old-school movie scoring methods.

=== Release ===
The full length of the score within the game was about three hours long, with an approximate 110 pieces. A 43-minute version with 32 tracks was concurrently released in 1998 as a CD album, sold at the LucasArts online company store.

== Critical reception ==
A sample of the "Casino Calavera" track as heard on the remastered soundtrack. In the first release of the game, IGN noted that "LucasArts has put together a film class soundtrack that uses a blend of simple jazz and classical Mexican themes to add depth to the atmosphere of an already fantastic title. Not only is the soundtrack not annoying, but once again it is used to reinforce the emotions delivered in various sequences of the game".

The soundtrack was very well received at its original release, and it continued to receive praise years after, often considered one of the best game soundtracks of all time.

At its original release, IGN called it a "beautiful soundtrack that you'll find yourself listening to even after you're done with the game". Chris Huelsbeck of Square Enix Music Online said "the compositions and performances are so good that listening to this album on a stand-alone basis can make people feel like they're in a bar back then". RPGFan said, "the pieces are beautifully composed, wonderfully played (...). has a stellar soundtrack with music that easily stands alone outside the context of the game. This CD was an absolute pleasure to listen to and comes highly recommended". Game Revolution in its game review praised it as one of the "most memorable soundtracks ever to grace the inside of a cranial cavity where an eardrum used to be". Twenty years later, ABC noted retrospectively that since the original release of the soundtrack it had been consistently praised; despite the technical limitations imposed on its original production "it was still considered [at the time of its release] a stellar album to listen to, even without the context of the game, which speaks to the composer's tremendous skill and musicality".

Years after the release, the soundtrack continued to receive critical acclaim. Kotaku noted in 2011 that "it remains as killer today as it was when the game launched in 1998". PC Gamer in its 2014 list of Top 100 Games, acclaimed Grim Fandango for including "one of the best soundtracks in PC gaming history". In 2017 Fact magazine also listed it as one of the "100 best video game soundtracks of all time". Kotaku noted that even among other lauded games that were successful in incorporating jazz in their scores to great advantage (EarthBound, The Operative: No One Lives Forever, and L.A. Noire), Grim Fandango's stood apart. Further comparing it with L.A. Noire, Kotaku added that it "doesn't come close to the variety and vivaciousness of McConnell's Grim Fandango score. From the dark, plunger-muted swing of 'Swanky Maximo' to the mellow, guitar-accompanied lobby-trombone of the appropriately named 'Frustration Man', it's simply good, video game-related or no". It further lauded "the epic saxophone of 'She Sailed Away', the chord-less free jazz of 'Blue Casket Bop', or the menacing bari sax/bass clarinet duet of 'Rubacava'" as highlights of an overall outstanding score. Alternative Magazine Online in 2015 noted that upon its original release it "instantly became one of the greatest video game soundtracks of all time" and that the remastered version went even further.

When the game and its soundtrack were remastered and re-released, they also garnered praise. Radio host Emily Reese called the score "amazing", further adding how she really enjoyed how McConnell wrote the various sections of the orchestra: "It seems [McConnell was] able to capitalize on really specific characteristics of the instruments; like you'll have the brass play in a militaristic style, or you'll have the bassoons or baby base clarinets being very mischievous, strings will do something where they are trembling(...)". Fact noted of the game that the game returned twenty years later in a new edition "to the masterpiece-accolades (and sales) it deserved all along. Its remastering kept the soul of the game intact while polishing what needed to be polished: the graphics, animation, controls, and most importantly, the music".

Several critics also noted how the music was a key contribution to enhancing the overall experience of the game. For example, at the time of the original release Computer Gaming World's review remarked that "a musical score (...) accompanies the art to complete the experience". 20 years later, The Ringer noted that the best example in the game of the blending of cultures was its soundtrack, by combining elements of an orchestral score, with more traditional South American strings, and the jazz and swing music of the film noir era, becoming "commonly celebrated as one of the best video game soundtracks of all time. Great adventure games such as Grim Fandango feature worlds so cohesive and rich with detail that they're transportive for the player and McConnell’s soundtrack is the glue that binds the game's elements". Kotaku noted upon revisiting the game in 2011 how "I was struck by just how much McConnell's soundtrack (...) elevates the basic game". In 2015 Fact magazine noted that "few soundtracks have ever felt more integral to the success of a video game" and that "the game's blend of styles would never have held together so well if it weren't for McConnell's masterful ability to fuse Mexican folk music with Duke Ellington-era big band jazz and noir scores in the spirit of Adolph Deutsch".

== Awards and rankings ==
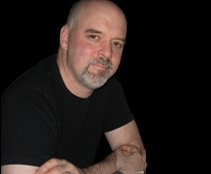
Peter McConnell, composer and producer of the Grim Fandango soundtrack. ABC said McConnell's work is "considered a stellar album to listen to, even without the context of the game, which speaks to the composer's tremendous skill and musicality".

In 1999's Academy of Interactive Arts & Sciences Annual Interactive Achievement Awards, the soundtrack was nominated in the category of "Outstanding Achievement in Sound and Music". It was also lauded by GameSpot, which awarded it the "Best PC Music awards", and included it in the "Ten Best PC Game Soundtracks" list in 1999.

At the time of the original release of Grim Fandango and its soundtrack, few video game music awards existed. Other video game music awards, such as from BAFTA or the Game Audio Network Guild, began to be awarded in the 2000s, and therefore Grim Fandango's soundtrack at the time of its release could not opt to compete for them. Since then it has been included in several rankings of best video game music.

Awards and nominations
Publication or ceremony	Award name	Result	Year	Ref.
GameSpot	Best PC Music award	Won	1998	
Academy of Interactive Arts & Sciences	Outstanding Achievement in Sound and Music	Nominated	1998	

Rankings
Publication	Ranking name	Position	Year	Ref.
GameSpot	Ten Best PC Game Soundtracks	Included in top ten	1999	
PC Gamer	Top 100 Games	Named one of the best soundtracks in PC gaming history	2014	
PC Magazine	The 11 Best Game Soundtracks Ever	1st	2014	
Fact	100 best video game soundtracks of all time	43rd	2017	
PC Magazine	The 20 Best Video Game Soundtracks Ever	Included in top 20	2020	

== Remastered soundtrack ==
Grim Fandango Remastered

Soundtrack album by Peter McConnell
- Released: 2015 (MP3), 2018 (vinyl)
- Venue: Melbourne Symphony Orchestra
- Studios: Pyramind Studios, Sony
- Genres: Big band, bebop
- Length: 1:00:18 (MP3); 1:15:47 (director's cut: MP3, vinyl); 3 hours (in-game soundtrack)
- Labels: Sumthing Else/Disney (MP3); Iam8bit (vinyl)

=== Background and context ===
McConnell had made the most of the resources he had for the score's original production, which meant devoting more of them where they could make the greatest impact while cutting corners in other areas. Even though, for example, he wished he had been able to find a better-sounding sampled piano, he did not regret not recording an acoustic piano as it would have meant compromising the quality of more important parts given the time and budget constraints. However, he had long wished to revisit the score if the opportunity arose, to fix and enhance the various aspects that had not been viable during the original production. He noted that "Grim's music was a little bit ahead of [its] time", and it suffered because of that. He also lamented that just two years after the release of Grim Fandango, orchestral recording in gaming took off.

The Grim Fandango game had been originally developed and published by LucasArts, which in 2012 was acquired by Disney. In 2013, Disney made the strategic decision to turn LucasArts into a publisher-only of video games, and licensing out its intellectual property. Tim Schafer, who had also long been eager to revisit and re-release the game and make it available to new platforms and to new generations, seized the opportunity and was able to acquire the rights to the game, in partnership with Sony.

When in 2013 Schafer offered McConnell the unique opportunity to remaster the soundtrack, McConnell was ready to jump in. He believed that while the original jazz music came out well, the orchestral part, done with 1997-era digital samples and a limited budget, did not fully match his vision. He believed that remaking the latter would make the greatest difference: "If you want to do something really great with this score, biggest bang for the buck is going to be to take those orchestral movements and record them live".

With the support of staff (who McConnell called "friends of Grim" by either having worked on the original project or had grown up with it as a favorite game) at Disney Interactive, LucasArts, and Sony Computer Entertainment, Schafer's Double Fine studio worked to remaster the game and re-released it in 2015.

=== Data recovery ===
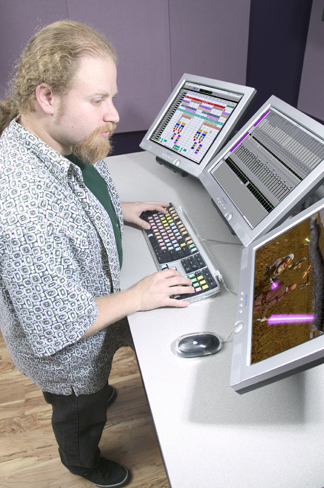
Jory Prum in his studio in a photograph of 2005. Prum was heavily involved in the retrieval of the original data, as well as doing the orchestral mixing for the remastered soundtrack.

The remastering of the soundtrack started with the retrieval of the original 16-year-old data, in a process dubbed by Polygon as "digital archeology". The music tracks were on archaic DLT backup tapes stored in the LucasArts/Disney archives. Rob Cowles, a marketer at LucasArts was credited for saving the assets while LucasArts was being acquired by Disney in 2012. Subsequently, Derek Williams was credited for finding them.

My colleague Jory Prum (...) is kind of a tech genius [who worked on recovering the old data]. (...) I'm sitting there biting my nails because we were relying so heavily on that data to really be able to do anything significant with the score. Otherwise we would have just had to remaster the stereo files which would have been a minor tweak at best.

— Peter McConnell, 2015

Once the original tapes were found, the next challenge was to retrieve the data from within them. McConnell remarked how their retrieval was a technical feat requiring specialized hardware and expertise Jory Prum (who then did the sound mixing for the orchestral pieces) spent two months recovering the data, with the use of DLT drive, an old Mac with a SCSI drive, and an old piece of software called Retrospect Remote. The fact that McConnell was able to open a Pro Tools session from 1997 on a new version of Pro Tools also proved key in being able to use the files. Except for the anecdotal disappearance of two cymbal hits, this process succeeded in recovering all the data of the three-hour score. McConnell called this recovery process "a chain of miracles" since "if any of the links had not held up, we would have had very little to work with at all". McConnell further gratefully credited the retrieval success to numerous people who were devoted fans of the game, calling it a "labor of love".

=== Improvements and re-recording ===
Just like with the original game development, project lead Tim Schafer had very little input into the soundtrack's re-mastering, except that "he was very supportive of the effort to make the music the highest quality possible".

Given the unique opportunity to re-visit a project first developed 17 years earlier in his career, McConnell was asked how different would the soundtrack be if he had developed it from scratch at the time of remastering. McConnell noted that if he were to start from scratch he would have taken the exact same approach, with the exception of the "crazy tempo" changes that he had never thought a real orchestra would have to perform; some parts were originally played live into a sequencer without regard for bar lines and retrospectively he would have taken a different approach. He also noted that there had been a small number of things that had long "bugged" him from the original release ("the occasional klunker, or ham-fisted move") that he finally got the chance to fix them. Ultimately, overall, "the pleasant surprise in the process was how well much of the original material held up".

External video
- Grim Fandango Remastered: "The Resurrection of Sound" with composer Peter McConnell Official making-of documentary of the remastered soundtrack (8:20 minutes)

To stay within the budget, McConnell felt he had to choose carefully which pieces would get the most attention and how. After the original Pro Tools project files were recovered, he found that some of the digital samples he had used originally did not sound good, and the team opted to re-mix, re-sample, add additional tracks, and re-orchestrate different parts of the score.

These tasks were assigned to three teams: an audio team at Sony recorded live tracks and remixed 45 minutes of jazz tunes (which included a few new live parts and some new solos); another team at Pyramind Studios in San Francisco replaced old samples with better sounds in another 45 minutes of music and re-mixed all of the cut scenes in six languages; and finally the Melbourne Symphony Orchestra (MSO) recorded about 30 minutes of orchestral music.

==== Melbourne Symphony Orchestra ====
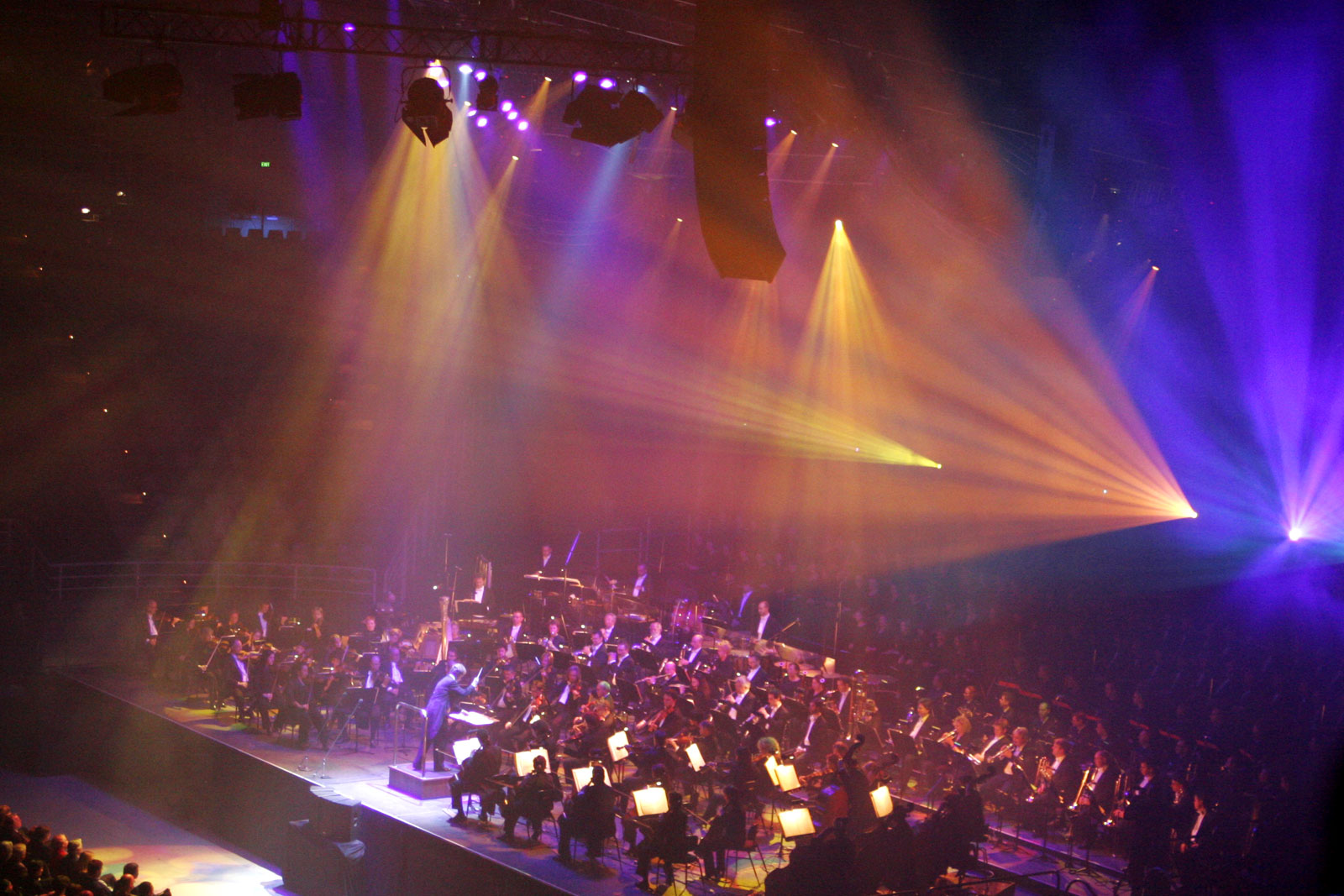
Picture of the Melbourne Symphony Orchestra. The orchestral part of the original soundtrack was digitally synthesized. One of the major improvements in the re-mastered release of 2015 was the recording of the orchestral parts by the Melbourne symphony orchestra.

The involvement of the Melbourne Symphony Orchestra (MSO) in the orchestration of the Grim Fandango soundtrack grew out of several prior collaborations that McConnell had had with the orchestra. The connection first happened when Special Projects Manager of the orchestra Andrew Pogson reached out to McConnell in early 2013 to do a pops concert performance of Grim Fandango. At the time, McConnell had been working on the soundtrack for Broken Age, a new adventure game by Tim Schafer. Pogson, having been a financial backer for Broken Age, pushed to have MSO record that score, making it the first time for the MSO to be involved in such a project. After that collaboration coming to fruition, working together in orchestrating Grim Fandango became "the next logical step" and it felt "like working with old friends". McConnell praised MSO, for their outstanding level of musicianship and focus and care; how they worked well together and reinforced yet again his notion from his early days in LucasArts that having a great team was of the highest value.

During the original production of the score, McConnell had never imaged that it would one day be re-recorded with a live orchestra. That meant that his composition was unconstrained by considerations of flow and changes of tempo that a real orchestra would have to contend with. Rather, in order to make it sound more lively during the original digital production, McConnell had intentionally incorporated many tempo changes. While it would have been possible to do live recordings of full songs with big tempo changes, it would have required an intensive rehearsal, meaning more time and costs. So when the opportunity came to re-record with the MSO, McConnell tried to save time by planning the recording by breaking cues into smaller segments, recording those one at a time, and then put them back together like a puzzle.

==== Pyramind studios ====
Pyramind studios composers Clint Bajakian and Jeremy Garren imported McConnell's original audio mixes into Cubase 7 along with MIDI tracks that were assigned to modern sample libraries residing on two slave PCs running Vienna Ensemble Pro loaded with leading sample libraries. Bajakian also added live classical guitar parts that were not covered in 1998 using the same instrument he played back then. The team faced the challenge to adjust MIDI parameters to maximize realism and sonic quality while preserving McConnell's original artistic intent.

To accomplish this, Garren noted that "this meant focused attention to mixing, EQ'ing, and programming articulation data on an individual instrument basis to bring each phrase and gesture in line with Pete's original intentions. It meant a constant back and forth with the original music and imagining, 'What should this sound like today?'" and Bajakian added: "For us to do this right, we had to also wrap our minds around the 'extra-musical' content of the music – the concepts, the references, the puns – the ideas that interact like characters in a play".

=== Outcome ===
McConnell noted that the one element that he and his team did not get "so perfectly" in the original release was the film noir orchestral part and that that was what they were "really able to do in a big way" with the remastering work. He also noted that between the remixes and the live symphony "it turned out to be the score the way it was always meant to be heard", also adding that "I have to say I'm glad I took extra care on the themes because I feel they were really able to blossom in the new live recordings".

McConnell estimated that he put in himself about 800 hours into the remastering project, in arranging, sample replacement, preparing for orchestration, mixing, and reviewing the music, resulting in over 2 hours of music that was completely overhauled, in addition to the 45 minutes of music the team had already recorded live in the original version. The outcome was described by McConnell as a score that had been "re-arranged, re-voiced, re-orchestrated, re-recorded, re-mixed, re-mastered and – most of all – retrieved" (and in a couple of key spots, even "re-composed").

The stand-alone remastered soundtrack was released concurrently with the remastered game in 2015 (17 years after the original release). The soundtrack was distributed under Nile Rodgers' label Sumthing Else. In 2018, to celebrate the 20th anniversary, the remastered soundtrack was released in vinyl.

== Track listings ==
Grim Fandango Original Game Soundtrack: Big Band, Bebop and Bones – 1998
No.	Title	Length
1.	"Casino Calavera"	1:06
2.	"Swanky Maximino"	2:16
3.	"Smooth Hector"	2:01
4.	"Mr. Frustration Man"	2:20
5.	"Hector Steps Out"	0:56
6.	"Hi-Tone Fandango"	1:23
7.	"She Sailed Away"	0:23
8.	"High Roller"	1:43
9.	"Domino's in Charge"	1:02
10.	"Trouble with Carla"	1:08
11.	"Blue Casket Bop"	1:10
12.	"Manny's Office"	1:15
13.	"Rubacava"	1:08
14.	"Blue Hector"	1:59
15.	"This Elevator is Slow"	1:03
16.	"Domino"	1:08
17.	"Don Copal"	1:00
18.	"Neon Ledge"	1:07
19.	"Nuevo Marrow"	1:28
20.	"Gambling Glottis"	2:11
21.	"Raoul Appears"	0:19
22.	"Scrimshaw"	0:54
23.	"Talking Limbo"	0:54
24.	"Coaxing Meche"	1:09
25.	"Lost Souls' Alliance"	2:14
26.	"Los Angelitos"	1:00
27.	"The Enlightened Florist"	1:25
28.	"Temple Gate"	1:44
29.	"Ninth Heaven"	1:18
30.	"Compañeros"	1:08
31.	"Manny & Meche"	2:17
32.	"Bone Wagon"	1:28
Total length:		43:37

Grim Fandango Remastered - Soundtrack – May 5, 2015
No.	Title	Length
1.	"Grim Fandango"	2:07
2.	"Intro"	3:06
3.	"On the Roof"	1:13
4.	"Mr. Frustration Man"	2:17
5.	"Brennis"	1:04
6.	"Ledge Peckers"	1:35
7.	"Domino's Office"	1:07
8.	"Companeros"	1:07
9.	"Lost Souls' Alliance"	2:10
10.	"Casino Calavera"	2:15
11.	"Swanky Maximino"	2:17
12.	"Smooth Hector"	1:56
13.	"She Sailed Away"	0:24
14.	"Hi-Tone Fandango"	1:21
15.	"High Roller"	1:43
16.	"By the Lighthouse"	1:13
17.	"Farewell Lola"	1:12
18.	"Hector Steps Out"	1:04
19.	"Gambling Glottis"	2:09
20.	"Trouble with Carla"	1:07
21.	"Blue Hector"	1:58
22.	"Blue Casket Bop"	1:08
23.	"Rubacava"	1:07
24.	"Shanghai'd"	0:59
25.	"The Lola Zapata"	1:04
26.	"Sunken Lola"	1:11
27.	"Miner's Room and Factory Hub"	2:03
28.	"Lamancha Sub - Crushed"	3:17
29.	"Temple Gate"	1:43
30.	"Mayan Train Station"	1:32
31.	"9th Heaven"	1:18
32.	"Nuevo Marrow"	1:30
33.	"The Enlightened Florist"	1:24
34.	"Meadow Flowers"	1:38
35.	"ByeBye"	2:15
36.	"Manny & Meche"	2:16
37.	"Bone Wagon"	1:28
Total length:		60:18

Grim Fandango Remastered Original Soundtrack Director's Cut – May 5, 2015 (bonus tracks)
No.	Title	Length
38.	"Manny's Office"	1:15
39.	"Copal's Office"	0:59
40.	"In The Lobby"	1:11
41.	"Lost Souls Alliance - Alt Solo"	2:10
42.	"Lost In The Petrified Forest"	1:18
43.	"This Elevator Is Slow"	1:02
44.	"Blue Casket Bop - Alt Solo"	1:08
45.	"Raoul Appears"	0:18
46.	"Scrimshaw"	0:54
47.	"Talking Limbo"	0:54
48.	"Domino's In Charge"	1:02
49.	"Los Angelitos"	1:00
50.	"Coaxing Meche"	1:09
51.	"Neon Ledge"	1:09
Total length:		16:29

Grim Fandango 2xLP Vinyl Soundtrack – 2019
No.	Title	Length
1.	"A1 Grim Fandango"	4:46
2.	"A2 Intro"	0:31
3.	"A3 On The Roof"	1:12
4.	"A4 Mr. Frustration"	2:17
5.	"A5 Brennis"	1:06
6.	"A6 Ledge Peckers"	1:37
7.	"A7 Domino's Office"	1:09
8.	"A8 Compañeros"	1:06
9.	"A9 Lost Souls Alliance"	2:12
10.	"A10 Casino Calavera"	2:15
11.	"A11 Swanky Maximino"	2:22
12.	"B1 Smooth Hector"	1:58
13.	"B2 She Sailed Away"	0:22
14.	"B3 Hi-Tone Fandango"	1:22
15.	"B4 High Roller"	1:43
16.	"B5 By the Lighthouse"	1:12
17.	"B6 Farewell Lola"	1:13
18.	"B7 Hector Steps Out"	1:07
19.	"B8 Gambling Glottis"	2:11
20.	"B9 Trouble With Carla"	1:09
21.	"B10 Blue Hector"	1:58
22.	"B11 Blue Casket Bop"	1:10
23.	"B12 Rubacava"	1:09
24.	"B13 Shanghai'd"	1:09
25.	"B14 The Lola Zapata"	1:05
26.	"B15 Sunken Lola"	1:09
27.	"C1 Miner's Room And Factory Hub"	2:04
28.	"C2 Lamancha Sub - Crushed"	3:18
29.	"C3 Temple Gate"	1:44
30.	"C4 Mayan Train Station"	1:33
31.	"C5 9th Heaven"	1:17
32.	"C6 Huevo Marrow"	1:31
33.	"C7 The Enlightened Florist"	1:25
34.	"C8 Meadow Flowers"	1:37
35.	"C9 ByeBye"	2:16
36.	"C10 Manny & Meche"	2:17
37.	"C11 Bone Wagon"	1:31
38.	"D1 Manny's Office"	1:16
39.	"D2 Copal's Office"	1:00
40.	"D3 In The Lobby"	1:11
41.	"D4 Lost Souls Alliance - Alt Solo"	2:11
42.	"D5 Lost In The Petrified Forest"	1:19
43.	"D6 This Elevator Is Slow"	1:03
44.	"D7 Blue Casket Bop - Alt Solo"	1:11
45.	"D8 Raoul Appears"	0:19
46.	"D9 Scrimshaw"	0:56
47.	"D10 Talking Limbo"	0:55
48.	"D11 Domino's In Charge"	1:05
49.	"D12 Los Angelitos"	1:01
50.	"D13 Coaxing Meche"	1:10
51.	"D14 Neon Ledge"	1:09
Total length:		76:47

== Releases ==
The first stand-alone release of the soundtrack was in a CD in 1998. It contained 32 tracks totalling 43 minutes from the about 3 hours of the full length of the game score. An extended version of 128 tracks was later available online. 17 years later, in 2015, the remastered soundtrack was released. It was produced under Nile Rodgers' label Sumthing Else. It had a standard release of 37 tracks, as well as a Director's Cut with 14 extra tracks (the latter sold exclusively through Sumthing Else). It included the original score from the LucasArts archives, new compositions by Peter McConnell and new orchestral arrangements, as well as new extended versions of jazz pieces re-mixed at Sony Computer Entertainment America. In 2018, celebrating the 20th anniversary of the original release of the game, the soundtrack was released for the first time in vinyl format. It included all the songs of the 2015-release of the Director's Cut. In 2023, celebrating the 25th anniversary, the vinyl records were re-released.

Main albums

Name	Date	Label	Format	Catalog	Notes	Ref.
Grim Fandango Original Game Soundtrack: Big Band, Bebop and Bones	1998	LucasArts Entertainment Company LLC	CD	1097929	CD originally sold exclusively in the United States' LucasArts online store. Later released for free as MP3.	
Grim Fandango Remastered - Soundtrack	May 5, 2015	Sumthing Else Music Works, Disney	MP3	SE-3139-2		
Grim Fandango Remastered Original Soundtrack Director's Cut	May 5, 2015	Sumthing Else Music Works	MP3		Sold exclusively through Sumthing Else website. The site closed in 2019.	
Grim Fandango 2xLP Vinyl Soundtrack	2019, 2023	iam8bit, Double Fine Productions	Double LP	8BIT8098	20th & 25th anniversary release; Director's cut of the remastered soundtrack, in vinyl format.	

Compilations

Name	Date	Label	Format	Catalog	Notes	Ref.
The Best Of LucasArts Original Soundtracks	2002	LucasArts	CD	8127927	LucasArts 20th anniversary compilation of original game soundtracks, including excerpts from The Dig, Outlaws, Grim Fandango, and the Monkey Island series. This release won the 2003 "Best Original Soundtrack Album" award from the Game Audio Network Guild.	
Level 5 - Video Games Live	August 15, 2016	Mystical Stone Entertainment, LLC; Video Games Live	MP3, CD		Compilation of video game soundtracks, from concerts organized by Video Games Live, and performed by the City of Prague Philharmonic Orchestra. Includes one song from Grim Fandango.	
Gaming in Symphony	June 14, 2019	EuroArts	MP3, LP	2067701	Concert performed by the Danish National Symphony Orchestra with the Danish National Concert Choir and various soloists, conducted by Eímear Noone. Includes Grim Fandango's main theme song, among music from other computer games.	

== Live performances ==
In 2013 McConnell collaborated with Melbourne Symphony Orchestra to do a pops concert performance of Grim Fandango. Around 2015 McConnell prepared a suite of music for performance by the Queensland Symphony Orchestra. Celebrating its 20th anniversary, a live performance of script-reading with live music was performed at Electronic Entertainment Expo 2018. Later the same year, an evening gala was organized in tribute of the soundtrack during the inaugural edition of the Game Music Festival in the National Forum of Music of Poland. Parts of the score was performed live, with 100 pages of musical arrangements prepared by Bartosz Pernal in cooperation with McConnell, who attended and performed in the event. Grim Fandango's main theme song was one of the pieces performed by the Danish National Symphony Orchestra and subsequently included in the album Gaming in Symphony. In 2023, to celebrate its 25th anniversary, Peter McConnell and a band performed several tunes of the soundtrack at the Cafe Du Nord in San Francisco. In 2024 the Manny and Meche song was included in a Game Developers Conference's concert that showcased notable game scores throughout history. The concert was directed by composer Austin Wintory, was performed by the San Francisco Conservatory of Music, and it also included Peter McConnell's participation.

== Legacy ==
Grim Fandango's soundtrack is considered a classic, receiving critical acclaim in its original release of 1998, and remaining a critics' favorite in ensuing years, including 17 years later in its remastered re-release in 2015. Its ability to "glue" together the game's elements and "elevate" it is seen as one of the high points of the video game music genre.

The Grim Fandango score remained decades later one of McConnell's most famous scores (with "Mr. Frustration Man" or "Swanky Maximino" being some of his favorite pieces because of the solo performances). For McConnell personally, he saw this as a special project in his musical career, calling Grim Fandango "almost like an opera" for how integrated the music was with the story. The project cemented a close working relationship between Schafer and McConnell that continued for decades after their work together at LucasArts.

The fact that the soundtrack had stood the test of time, was attributed by McConnell to a combination of "story and the world are so rich and potent, and deal with timeless themes on a level rarely attained in a game", the rich musical heritage of film noir scores and freedom of jazz, the talent of the musicians inspired by the musical effervescence of San Francisco's mission district. While the video game soundtracks are meant to be created in support of the larger goal of an integrated interactive experience of dialogue, graphics, story, and sound, Grim Fandango's soundtrack also stands on its own, with critics noting that it can be appreciated independently of the game it was created for. The music was also performed for live audiences.

The soundtrack is also notable for being one of the best examples of early adaptive music systems. With McConnell having created tracks for almost every location and character in Grim Fandango, these were weaved into a continuous sequence of music, seamlessly transitioning to different pieces as the player progressed through the game, making it the most cinematic soundtrack of any LucasArts game. This was accomplished with the use of the pioneering iMUSE software, previously created by McConnell and Michael Land, and it heralded the age of dynamic and cinematic music experiences in video games.

== Personnel ==
McConnell dubbed the Grim Fandango score as "the mission district score", as virtually all the performers and a lot of the inspiration came from it.

Original release (Note: The official credits from the original CD cover and from the game's original release manual and end credits only list the personnel in the production team and not the performers. In subsequent interviews, McConnell credited several performers including Bill Ortiz, Derek Jones (bass), Ralph Carney, Hunt Christian (cello), Red Hot Skillet Lickers band (horns and reeds), a mariachi band, and a Peruvian flutist. When the remastered game and soundtrack were released, their credits included a more comprehensive list of the original performers. Those credits are included here within original release section. Additional credits, specific to the later release are included in the remastered soundtrack section. In 2021 Double Fine published in its website a slightly expanded list of credits, also included here. Several publications point to additional performers (such as the aforementioned mariachi band) who remain uncredited by name.)

Production team

- Peter McConnell – composer, producer
- Jeff Kliment – music engineering, mixing, lead sound design
- Hans Christian Reumschüssel – additional music production
- Michael Land – sound production supervision
- Martin Schafer – provided charango

Performers

- Ralph Carney – clarinet, bass clarinet, contrabass clarinet, slide clarinet, baritone and bass saxes
- Sheldon Brown – clarinet and bass clarinet
- Paul Hanson – bassoon, clarinet, alto and tenor saxes
- Bill Ortiz – trumpet
- Dan Armstrong – trombone
- Shane Norman – trombone
- Hans Christian – cello
- Clint Bajakian – classical guitar and melodica
- Peter McConnell – electric guitar, charango and violin (tango piece)
- Derek Jones – bass
- Paul van Wageningen – drums (Note: The Grim Fandango Remastered credits included a line in memory of van Wageningen: "In memoriam – Paul van Wageningen (1955-2012)")
- Jorge Molina – drums, quena
- Geresh Cruden – tablas
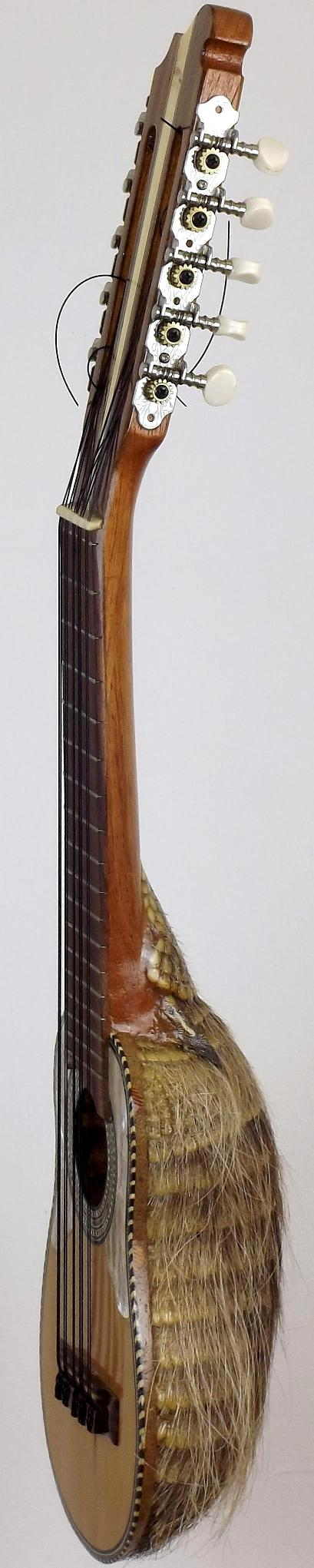
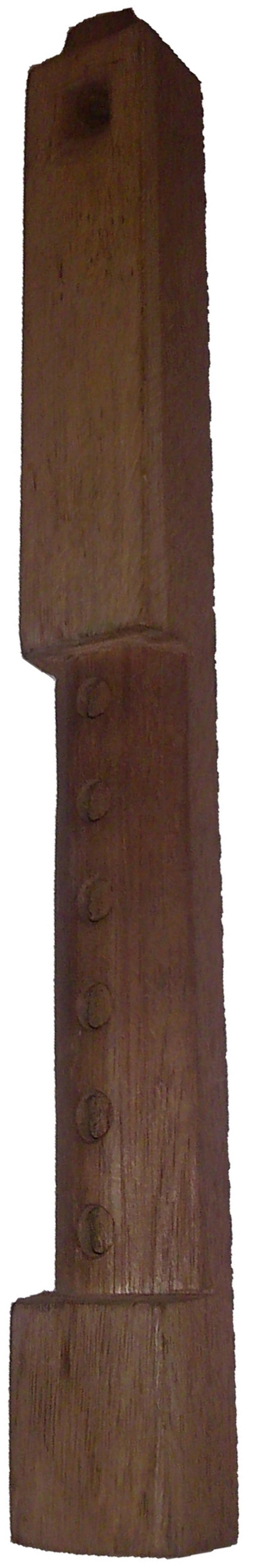
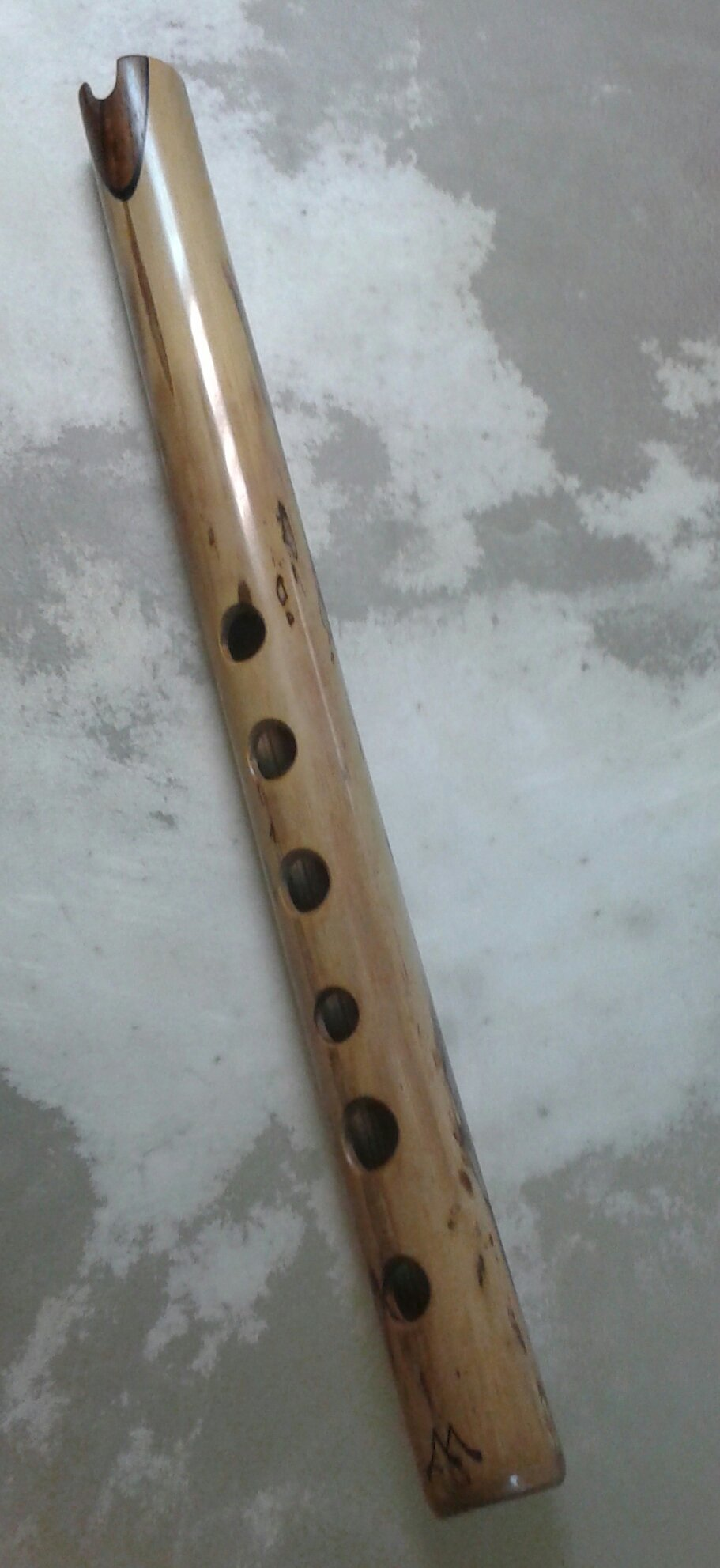
Charango, tarka flute, and quena flute

Remastered soundtrack – Additional credits

Production

- Anthony Caruso – mixing (Sony Computer Entertainment America)
- Jonathan Mayer – mix project manager (Sony Computer Entertainment America)
- Camden Stoddard – mixing music with ambient sound effects for in-game play (Double Fine Productions)
- Clint Bajakian – midi re-orchestration and mixing, cutscenes mixing (Pyramind studios)
- Jeremy Garren – midi re-orchestration and mixing, cutscenes mixing (Pyramind studios)
- Jonathan Buch – midi re-orchestration and mixing
- Mike Forst – cutscenes mixing (Pyramind studios), production manager
- Jonathan Buch – production assistant (Pyramind studios)
- Ophylia Wispling – production assistant (Pyramind studios)

Melbourne Symphony recordings

- Performed by the Melbourne Symphony Orchestra
- Brett Kelly – conductor
- Andrew Pogson – special projects manager
- Haig Burnell – ABC producer
- Chris Lawson – ABC sound engineer
- Nick Mierisch – ABC sound engineer
- Russell Thompson – ABC sound engineer
- Karim Elmahmoudi – orchestration
- Jory Prum - orchestral mixing, session engineer (Studio Jory)
- Joel Raabe - session engineer (Studio Jory)

Data management

- Rob Cowles – original data safeguarding
- Derek Williams – original data recovery
- Jory Prum – original data retrieval

Album art

- Holly Rothrock – 2019 vinyl release album art
