= Peter McConnell =

American video game composer and musician

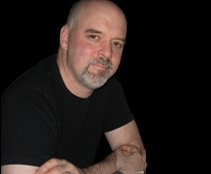
- McConnell in 2010

Background information
- Also known as: Peter Mc; Pete McConnell
- Born: Peter Nelson McConnell; April 19, 1960 (age 66); Pittsburgh, Pennsylvania, U.S.
- Genre: Various
- Occupations: Composer; musician
- Instruments: Keyboards; synthesisers; guitar; violin
- Years active: 1991–present
- Website: petermc.com

Peter Nelson McConnell (born April 19, 1960), also known as Peter Mc, is an American video game composer and musician. He is best known for his work at LucasArts and for composing the soundtracks for every Sly Cooper game since the second installment.

== Early life and education ==
McConnell was born in Pittsburgh, Pennsylvania. He studied music as an undergraduate at Harvard University in the 1980s under Timothy Vincent Clarke, Curt Cacioppo and Ivan Tcherepnin. At Harvard, McConnell befriended the future LucasArts composer Michael Land, who composed many of the company's titles, and worked with him at the audio company Lexicon.

== Career ==
While beginning his career in the Sound Department at LucasArts, Land needed someone to compose and implement music into his second project, Monkey Island 2: LeChuck's Revenge, and McConnell stepped in. McConnell and Land co-invented iMUSE, LucasArts' patented interactive music system.

During his time at LucasArts, McConnell composed many soundtracks for games such as those in the Monkey Island, Indiana Jones, and Star Wars series. Notable titles from this time include Grim Fandango, scored with unique Mexican-influenced jazz, klezmer and traditional film score style, and Full Throttle, featuring a rock soundtrack, which McConnell scored with rock group The Gone Jackals. While composing music for these two games, McConnell worked closely with Tim Schafer, who later hired him to compose scores for Psychonauts, Brütal Legend, and Costume Quest for his company Double Fine Productions.

McConnell left LucasArts in 2000 but contributed to Escape from Monkey Island and the special edition of The Secret of Monkey Island. Since then, McConnell has composed scores for Psychonauts, Sly 2: Band of Thieves, Sly 3: Honor Among Thieves (about which McConnell says he was influenced by Henry Mancini's works), and Kinectimals.

McConnell is one of the founding members of G.A.N.G., the Game Audio Network Guild. He is also a known live-action music performer, playing the electric violin.

In 2013, McConnell returned to the Sly Cooper franchise to score the fourth game, Sly Cooper: Thieves in Time, released in February of that year. The Nashville Music Scoring Orchestra performed the score. Also, for the first time ever, McConnell's entire score was released on iTunes to accompany the game's release.

McConnell worked on the Double Fine titles Broken Age and the remastered version of Grim Fandango, both of which include performances by the Melbourne Symphony Orchestra. He scored the 2021 Psychonauts 2, for which he was nominated for a BAFTA Games Award and a D.I.C.E. Award. He also wrote music for the 2020 film Intersect.

== Personal life ==
He married Amy McConnell and they have two children, Eben and Alice.

== Works ==
=== Video game soundtracks ===
Title	Year	Notes
Monkey Island 2: LeChuck's Revenge	1991	With Michael Land and Clint Bajakian
Indiana Jones and the Fate of Atlantis	1992	With Michael Land and Clint Bajakian
Star Wars: X-Wing	1993	With Michael Land and Clint Bajakian
Sam & Max Hit the Road	1993	With Michael Land and Clint Bajakian
Day of the Tentacle	1993	With Michael Land and Clint Bajakian
Star Wars: Rebel Assault	1993	Sound advice, with Michael Land
Star Wars: TIE Fighter	1994	
Star Wars: Rebel Assault II: The Hidden Empire	1995	Sound Quality Control
Full Throttle	1995	Orchestral Composer & Music Producer, Additional Programming
The Dig	1995	iMUSE Music System
Shadows of the Empire	1996	Music Editor/Sound Quality Control
Afterlife	1996	
Star Wars Jedi Knight: Dark Forces II	1997	
Herc's Adventures	1997	Music Consultant
Star Wars: Masters of Teräs Käsi	1997	Special thanks
Star Wars: Yoda Stories	1997	Music Editing
Star Wars: X-Wing vs. TIE Fighter	1997	Music Editing
Star Wars: X-Wing - Collector Series	1998	Music Editing
Star Wars Jedi Knight: Mysteries of the Sith	1998	Music Editing
Grim Fandango	1998	
Star Wars: X-Wing Alliance	1999	iMUSE Music System
Star Wars Episode I: Racer	1999	Music Editing
Star Wars Episode I: The Phantom Menace	1999	Music Editing
Star Wars: Yoda's Challenge - Activity Center	1999	Music Editing
Star Wars: Pit Droids	1999	With Michael Land
Star Wars: Anakin's Speedway	1999	With Clint Bajakian
Star Wars: Force Commander	2000	Additional Music Composition, Lead Music Production and Editing
Escape from Monkey Island	2000	With Clint Bajakian, Anna Karney, Michael Land, Michael Lande
Star Wars: Battlefront	2004	Music editing
The Bard's Tale	2004	With Tommy Tallarico, Clint Bajakian, Jared Emerson-Johnson
Sly 2: Band of Thieves	2004	With Bill Wolford
Sly 3: Honor Among Thieves	2005	With Bill Wolford
Psychonauts	2005	
Thrillville	2006	With Alistair Lindsay, David Collins and Jesse Harlin
Calling All Cars!	2007	
The Sims 2: Celebration! Stuff	2007	Stereo Object Music
The Sims 2: Castaway	2007	Additional music
Pain	2007	
Insecticide	2008	
LEGO Indiana Jones: The Original Adventures	2008	Music editor
Tornado Outbreak	2009	Musician Magician, Composer Extraordinaire and all around "Groovy" Guy
The Secret of Monkey Island: Special Edition	2009	Violin, special thanks
inFAMOUS	2009	
Brütal Legend	2009	Original Music Composer, Orchestrator and Production
Costume Quest	2010	Original Music Composer, Orchestrator and Production
Kinectimals	2010	Music Supervisor, with Jared Emerson-Johnson
Sports Champions	2010	Additional music
Monkey Island 2: LeChuck's Revenge - Special Edition	2010	Original music, special thanks
Kinect Disneyland Adventures	2011	With Paul Lipson, Laura Karpman, Mark Griskey, Wataru Hokoyama and Lennie Moore
Star Wars: The Old Republic	2011	Cantina Music
Stacking	2011	Music composer, orchestrations, production
Iron Brigade	2011	Music composer, orchestrations, production
Sesame Street: Once Upon a Monster	2011	With David Earl
PlayStation All-Stars Battle Royale	2012	Sly Cooper music
Sly Cooper: Thieves in Time	2013	With Michael Bricker
Plants vs. Zombies 2: It's About Time	2013	With Laura Shigihara, Guy Whitmore, Korby Sears, Dave Cowen, Christopher Ballew and C. Andrew Rohrmann
Hearthstone	2013	
Plants vs. Zombies: Garden Warfare	2014	
Costume Quest 2	2014	
Broken Age	2014	With Karim Elmahmoudi
Grim Fandango: Remastered	2015	
Plants vs. Zombies: Garden Warfare 2	2016	
Day of the Tentacle: Remastered	2016	Original music, special thanks
Psychonauts in the Rhombus of Ruin	2017	
Full Throttle: Remastered	2017	Orchestral Music Revoicing
World of Warcraft: Battle for Azeroth	2018	Additional music
Irony Curtain: From Matryoshka with Love	2019	With Arkadiusz Reikowski
Plants vs. Zombies: Battle for Neighborville	2019	
Psychonauts 2	2021	
Goblin Stone	2022	
Voodoo Detective	2022	Music producer
Return to Monkey Island	2022	With Michael Land and Clint Bajakian
World of Warcraft: The War Within	2025	Additional music

=== Film ===
Title	Year	Director
Intersect	2020	Gus Holwerda

=== Acting ===
Title	Role	Notes
Super Star Wars: The Empire Strikes Back	Yoda	Voice
Star Wars Rogue Squadron II: Rogue Leader	Admiral Ackbar	Voice
Double Fine Adventure	Self	Documentary series
Beep: A Documentary History of Game Sound	Self	Documentary

== Written works ==
- McConnell, Peter (September 1999). "Dance of the Dead: The Adventures of a Composer Creating the Game Music for Grim Fandango". Electronic Musician. 15 (9). New York: NewBay Media, LLC: 30–32, 35–36, 38–40, 42. ISSN 0884-4720.
- US patent 5315057, LAND MICHAEL Z [US]; MCCONNELL PETER N [US], "Method and apparatus for dynamically composing music and sound effects using a computer entertainment system (iMUSE patent)", assigned to LUCASARTS ENTERTAINMENT CO [US]
