= Clint Bajakian =

American video game composer

- Born: Clinton J. Bajakian; 1962 (age 63–64); Bryn Mawr, Pennsylvania, U.S.
- Occupations: Composer, musician
- Years active: 1991–present
- Education: New England Conservatory (BA); University of Michigan (MM)

Clint Bajakian (born 1962) is an American video game composer and musician.

== Biography ==
Bajakian was born in Bryn Mawr, Pennsylvania. He was linked with music since age of eight. In middle school, Bajakian played in marching bands, and also played in a range of rock bands from 1977 to 1984. He has studied music at the New England Conservatory, earning degrees of double-Bachelor of Arts in Classic Guitar Performance. Then, Bajakian enrolled in the University of Michigan, earning a Master of Music degree in Music Composition.

After that, he joined LucasArts under invitation of a good friend of Bajakian's and his co-player in rock bands Michael Land. Bajakian worked for LucasArts from 1991 until May 2000. He has worked on several classic LucasArts games, where he gained much of his fame with Michael Land and Peter McConnell, LucasArts' other principal composers. While there, Bajakian received fame for his Ennio Morricone-influenced score for 1997 western shooter Outlaws which received a Special Achievement award from Computer Gaming Magazine. After quitting LucasArts he formed his own sound production company, C.B. Studios. His company changed names to The Sound Department, and finally to Bay Area Sound. Recently, he has ventured into working with other publishers as well as writing the score for a short film, The Upgrade. Bajakian joined Sony Computer Entertainment in 2004 and headed up the music production group in original scoring as Senior Music Manager until 2013. In October 2013 he became VP of Development and Composer at Pyramind Studios, contributing original music to Blizzard Entertainment's World of Warcraft: Warlords of Draenor, among other projects.

Clint Bajakian was the first vice president and co-founder of the Game Audio Network Guild and is a member of Academy of Interactive Arts and Sciences. In 2013, Bajakian received the Lifetime Achievement Award from the Game Audio Network Guild, and in 2012, the Outstanding Alumni Award from The New England Conservatory.

== Discography ==
=== Video game soundtracks ===
Year	Title	Notes
1991	Monkey Island 2: LeChuck's Revenge	With Michael Land and Peter McConnell
1992	Indiana Jones and the Fate of Atlantis	With Michael Land and Peter McConnell
1993	Day of the Tentacle	With Michael Land and Peter McConnell
1993	Sam and Max Hit the Road	With Michael Land and Peter McConnell
1993	Star Wars: X-Wing	With Michael Land and Peter McConnell
1993	Star Wars: Rebel Assault	Sound Editing & Processing
1994	Star Wars: TIE Fighter	Music and Orchestration, Digital Sound Effects, Additional Directing and Editing
1995	Star Wars: Dark Forces	Music and Orchestration, Digital Sound Effects, Instrument Patches
1995	Full Throttle	Sound
1995	The Dig	Ambient Design
1996	Star Wars: Shadows of the Empire	Music Editor/Sound Quality Control
1996	Indiana Jones and his Desktop Adventures	Music & Sound Effects Editing
1997	Outlaws	With Mark Crowley and Hans Christian Reumschuessel
1997	Star Wars: Jedi Knight – Dark Forces II	Sound
1997	The Curse of Monkey Island	Sound design
1998	Grim Fandango	Sound design
1998	Star Wars: Jedi Knight – Mysteries of the Sith	Voice Processing
1998	Star Wars: DroidWorks	Music Editing, Ambient Sound Editing, Voice Processing, Sound Design Supervisor
1999	Indiana Jones and the Infernal Machine	Music adaptation of John Williams' themes
1999	Star Wars: Yoda's Challenge – Activity Center	Original Song Music and Direction
1999	Star Wars: X-Wing Alliance	Music Editing
1999	Star Wars: Anakin's Speedway	Sound Design Supervisor
2000	Star Wars Episode I: Jedi Power Battles	Lead Sound Designer
2000	Star Wars: Force Commander	Sound Production Supervisor
2000	Star Wars: Demolition	Sound design
2000	Escape from Monkey Island	Music Supervisor
2001	Star Wars: Super Bombad Racing	Music Supervisor
2001	The Simpsons Wrestling	Sound effects
2002	Metal Dungeon	Sound effects
2002	Star Trek: Bridge Commander	Sound Production, CB Studios
2002	Star Wars: Jedi Knight II – Jedi Outcast	Music editing
2003	Star Wars: Jedi Knight – Jedi Academy	Music editing
2003	Indiana Jones and the Emperor's Tomb	With Steve Zuckerman
2003	Unreal II: The Awakening	With Jack Wall, Jeremy Soule, Alexander Brandon and Crispin Hands
2003	Star Wars: Knights of the Old Republic	Additional Sound Design
2003	The Lord of the Rings: The Return of the King	Additional Sound Design
2003	NFL GameDay 2004	Chant Recording, Direction, and Production
2003	MTV Celebrity Deathmatch	Sound
2003	Battlestar Galactica	FMV Composer, with Cris Liesch, Tom Zehnder and Steve Kuray
2004	The Bard's Tale	With Tommy Tallarico, Jared Emerson-Johnson and Peter McConnell
2004	Tiger Woods PGA Tour 2005	Additional music
2004	Star Wars Trilogy: Apprentice of the Force	Original Music Adaptation, with Jocelyn Daoust
2004	Rise to Honor	Sound design
2004	007: Everything or Nothing	Sound design
2005	SOCOM 3 U.S. Navy SEALs	Music Supervisor
2005	God of War	Music Supervisor
2006	Syphon Filter: Dark Mirror	With Jonathan Mayer, Mark Snow and Lior Rosner
2006	Thrillville	With various others
2006	SOCOM U.S. Navy SEALs: Fireteam Bravo 2	Senior Music Supervisor
2007	Uncharted: Drake's Fortune	Senior Music Supervisor
2007	Warhawk	Senior Music Supervisor
2007	SOCOM U.S. Navy SEALs: Tactical Strike	Senior Music Supervisor
2007	PAIN	Senior Music Supervisor
2007	Lair	Senior Music Supervisor
2007	God of War II	Senior Music Supervisor
2008	Twisted Metal: Head-On – Extra Twisted Edition	Senior Music Supervisor
2008	God of War: Chains of Olympus	Senior Music Supervisor
2008	SOCOM U.S. Navy SEALs: Confrontation	Senior Music Manager
2008	MotorStorm: Pacific Rift	Senior Music Manager
2008	Linger in Shadows	Senior Music Manager
2009	Uncharted 2: Among Thieves	Senior Music Manager
2009	Resistance: Retribution	Senior Music Manager
2009	Jak and Daxter: The Lost Frontier	Senior Music Manager
2009	inFAMOUS	Senior Music Manager
2009	Gran Turismo	Senior Music Manager
2009	Flower	Senior Music Manager
2009	Fat Princess	Senior Music Manager
2009	inFAMOUS	Played guitar
2009	Killzone 2	SCEA Music Mastering
2009	God of War Collection	Special thanks
2010	God of War III	Senior Music Manager
2010	Syphon Filter: Logan's Shadow	Senior Music Manager
2010	Sports Champions	Senior Music Manager
2010	SOCOM U.S. Navy SEALs: Fireteam Bravo 3	Senior Music Manager
2010	ModNation Racers	Senior Music Manager
2010	MAG	Senior Music Manager
2010	Heavy Rain	Senior Music Manager
2010	God of War: Ghost of Sparta	Senior Music Manager
2010	Fat Princess: Fistful of Cake	Senior Music Manager
2011	Uncharted 3: Drake's Deception	Senior Music Manager
2011	Uncharted: Golden Abyss	Senior Music Manager
2011	SOCOM 4 U.S. Navy SEALs	Senior Music Manager
2011	MotorStorm: Apocalypse	Senior Music Manager
2011	Medieval Moves: Deadmund's Quest	Senior Music Manager
2011	Infamous: Festival of Blood	Senior Music Manager
2011	inFAMOUS 2	Senior Music Manager
2011	Killzone 3	SCEA PD Services Group
2012	Twisted Metal	Senior Music Manager
2012	Starhawk	Senior Music Manager
2012	Sorcery	Senior Music Manager
2012	Resistance: Burning Skies	Senior Music Manager
2012	Journey	Senior Music Manager
2012	Datura	Senior Music Manager
2013	Sound Shapes	Senior Music Manager
2013	Sly Cooper: Thieves in Time	Senior Music Manager
2013	God of War: Ascension	Senior Music Supervisor
2014	World of Warcraft: Warlords of Draenor	With various others
2014	Broken Age	Pyramind Creative Director
2015	Grim Fandango: Remastered	Sound design, played guitars and melodica
2016	Day of the Tentacle: Remastered	Original music, special thanks
2018	World of Warcraft: Battle for Azeroth	Additional music
2019	Death Stranding	Whistling
2021	Psychonauts 2	Played electric guitar
2022	Return to Monkey Island	With Michael Land and Peter McConnell
2025	Ale Abbey - In Beer we Trust	Composer and sound designer

=== Film Soundtrack ===
- Panzehir (2014)

== Filmography ==
=== Video games ===
Year	Title	Voice role	Notes
1993	Super Star Wars: The Empire Strikes Back	Darth Vader	
1993	Star Wars: X-Wing	Darth Vader	Uncredited
1997	Star Wars: Masters of Teräs Käsi	Darth Vader	
1999	Star Wars: Episode I – The Phantom Menace	Jabba the Hutt	
1999	Star Wars Episode I: The Gungan Frontier	Narrator	
2000	Star Wars: Demolition	Jabba the Hutt / Boush / Battle Droid	
2001	Star Wars: Super Bombad Racing	Darth Maul	
2001	Star Wars: Obi-Wan	Bith Band Member / Jin'ha Warrior	
2001	Star Wars Episode I: Battle for Naboo	Borvo the Hutt / Ric Olie / Naboo Citizen	
2002	Star Wars Racer Revenge	Jabba the Hutt	
2002	Star Wars: Galactic Battlegrounds	Boorka the Hutt / Jabba the Hutt	
2002	Star Wars: Bounty Hunter	Jabba the Hutt / Meeko's Thug	

=== Other works ===
- The Upgrade (2000)
