= Sean Clark =

Video game designer

Sean Clark is a video game designer, director, and programmer who worked on a number of notable LucasArts adventure games from early 1990 through to 2022.

== Game development history ==
- Indiana Jones and the Last Crusade: The Graphic Adventure (1989)
- Loom (1990)
- The Secret of Monkey Island (1990)
- Indiana Jones and the Fate of Atlantis (1992)
- Sam & Max Hit the Road (1993)
- The Dig (1995)
- Big Sky Trooper (1996)
- Escape from Monkey Island (2000)
- Full Throttle II: Hell on Wheels (2002; unreleased)
