= Metal Dungeon =

2002 video game

- North American packaging artwork
- Developer: Panther Software
- Publishers: JP: Panther Software; WW: Xicat Interactive
- Platform: Xbox
- Release: JP: February 28, 2002; NA: December 3, 2002; EU: December 6, 2002
- Genre: Role-playing video game
- Mode: Single-player

Metal Dungeon (メタルダンジョン, Metaru Danjon) is a turn-based role-playing video game developed by Panther Software for Microsoft's Xbox game system.

The game takes place in a fictional alternate reality where countries have access to highly advanced magitechnology. In the process of creating monsters with this technology using an ancient creature named "The Gods of Magic"; it broke free of its bonds and took control of the secret facility and proceeded to slay all of the research team and arm the compounds defenses. The player is a commander in charge of the Cyborg Enforcer Teams sent into the dungeon to reclaim it. The game featured 100 levels of randomly generated maps, the first ten being the game's main story mode. The other 90 were extended play for players wanting to continue playing with their strong characters.

== Gameplay ==
As the game starts, you create a team of Enforcers for your expeditions into the dungeon, with the option to create over 40 total. When creating your characters you are given the ability to alter the height, sex, ethnicity, weight and hairstyle as well as given a choice between the Fencer, Caster, Analyzer, Striker, or Broader classes; Each falling into a Dungeons and Dragons styled role. Several Advanced classes were available by finding Class Chips in the dungeon and applying them to your characters. Once inside the dungeon, the player's team must move around, find monsters and equipment while leveling up. A major point unsaid in-game is that you are not expected to be able to beat a level's boss on the first time entering the level; as you could only allocate level up points while out of the dungeon.

Dungeons were randomly generated, most adhering to a typical design that made the map seem less random than it was. Each level has a control room that could possibly be locked, holding a boss monster that must be defeated to win the level and unlock the next one.

Fencer Fighter class that could use Hammers or Swords and had the rare chance of performing a move like a Final Fantasy "Limit Break" that would damage all enemies at once.

Analyzer Ranged in class. Without an Analyzer in the party, the player is unable to know how much health enemies have and their current HP amount. Analyzers used firearms ranging from laser beams, to machine guns, to rocket launchers that all shared the same in-game model.

Caster Basic Spell Caster that could be wired with a variety of Spell Chips either bought from the in-game shop or found in the dungeon. Each spell had a number of charges that had to be refilled by visiting the surface. Casters automatically blocked until the player told them what spell to use.

Broader The Jack-Of-All-Trades class that had a flat rate for all skill gains at the expense of leveling up extremely slowly and was reserved for advanced players that foresaw spending a large time grinding.

Striker A barbarian class that used combat gloves as their weapon. Each strike had a rare chance of instantly killing a non-boss enemy.

== Reception ==
Reception

Aggregate score
Aggregator	Score
Metacritic	44/100

Review scores
Publication	Score
Famitsu	23/40
Game Informer	6/10
GamesMaster	50%
GameSpot	3.1/10
GameZone	7/10
IGN	3.5/10
Jeuxvideo.com	6/20
Official Xbox Magazine (US)	6.1/10
TeamXbox	3.4/10
X-Play	2/5

The game received "generally unfavorable reviews" according to the review aggregation website Metacritic. In Japan, Famitsu gave it a score of 23 out of 40.
