= Herc's Adventures =

1997 video game

- Sega Saturn box art
- Developers: Big Ape Productions; LucasArts
- Publisher: LucasArts
- Composer: Michael Land
- Platforms: Sega Saturn, PlayStation
- Release: Saturn: NA: July 14, 1997; PlayStation: NA: July 31, 1997; EU: December 10, 1997
- Genre: Action-adventure
- Modes: Single player, multiplayer

Herc's Adventures is a 1997 action-adventure video game released by LucasArts for the Sega Saturn and PlayStation. The player controls one of three ancient Greek heroes: Herc (Hercules), Atlanta (Atalanta), and Jason, who are on a quest to defeat Hades and save the goddess of nature, Persephone.

Herc's Adventures was originally announced as a Saturn exclusive with a release date of December 1996, but delays pushed its release back to July 1997. The PlayStation version was released internationally, while the Saturn version was exclusive to North America. Virgin Interactive Entertainment had planned to release the Saturn version in Europe in September 1997, but it was dropped from the release schedule due to the company's withdrawal of support for the Saturn. In 2014, the game was re-released for PlayStation Network in North America.

== Gameplay ==
Herc's Adventures is an action-adventure game with an overhead format similar to Zombies Ate My Neighbors. The characters pick up various weapons and items, which include: pepper breath against bees and wasps, frost breath that freezes enemies, lightning which blasts a target with electrical energy, spears, boar traps, flaming spears (used against the Hydra to prevent its head from reforming), bombs, an evil Pandora's box which when opened releases rough weather, a shrink doll which miniaturizes any target and a laser gun. Items include Circe's potion which turned the player into a pig to fit into small crevices, Medusa and Minotaur's head, and the golden fleece (which opens the gates of Hades' underworld).

Gyros increase the player's health bar, and each hero has a second strength bar that depletes whenever moving or picking up an object. Health and strength are increased by buying lessons from a strength trainer or finding red hearts.

Every time the players die, they are sent down to the underworld and need to fight their way to the exit in order to continue. The more they die, the further back into the underworld they are sent, making it increasingly harder to fight their way out. Dying five times results in a game over.

With the exception of the switch to and from the underworld section, the game world is presented as an open, singular map, without any loading screens or interstitials between areas.

== Reception ==
Reception

Review scores
| Publication | Score |
|---|---|
| Electronic Gaming Monthly | 8.25/10 (SAT) |
| GameSpot | 7.8/10 (SAT, PS1) |
| IGN | 6/10 (PS1) |
| Next Generation | 3/5 (PS1) |

Herc's Adventures met with mostly positive reviews, with praise for the graphics, offbeat humor, the amount of lands to explore, and inclusion of three playable characters, each with their own strengths and weaknesses that make a difference in how the game plays.

The more mixed reviews found some faults with the gameplay. Next Generation opined that the gameplay is too one-note and that the skewed perspective sometimes creates confusion about where the player character can go, though the reviewer still concluded that the game is fun enough and different enough to be enjoyable. IGN criticized only the fact that the game is not a polygon-based fighting game or racing game, remarking that it was exceptionally good for a game that did not fall into either of those genres. Most critical commentary on the gameplay was positive, however, with several critics commenting that the cooperative two-player mode is especially fun. Shawn Smith of Electronic Gaming Monthly stated that "the gameplay is flawless."

Glenn Rubenstein of GameSpot said that "The graphics, gameplay, and humor make a unique mix that results in a truly fresh title unlike most of the other games on the market today." Major Mike gave the Saturn version a perfect 5.0 out of 5 in all four GamePro categories (graphics, sound, control, and funfactor), noting in particular the excellent incorporation of mythological figures. He gave the PlayStation version a 4.5 out of 5 in all four categories, but did not directly compare it to the Saturn version, and Rubenstein gave the two versions identical scores.
