= Michael Land =

American video game composer

Michael Z. Land (born 1961) is an American video game composer and musician best known for his scores for various games produced by LucasArts.

== Biography ==
=== Early life and career ===
Michael Land was born in the North Shore area north of Boston, Massachusetts. His parents enrolled him in classical piano lessons when he was five, and he continued in these until he chose to stop out of frustration at age twelve. He started to play the electric bass guitar a couple of years later. He focused more on improvisation, and he played with several bands throughout high school.

In 1979, Land enrolled in the music program at Harvard University, where he concentrated on electronic music. He also rekindled his interest in classical music, particularly that of Ludwig van Beethoven. After graduation, he entered Mills College in Oakland, California to further study electronic music. He broadened his study to Renaissance polyphony, and he also studied computer programming.

When Land graduated from Mills in 1987, he took a job as a digital technician at an audio signal processor manufacturer called Lexicon. Land worked for the company for three years, a period he spent honing his programming skills and writing operating system software for the company's MIDI remote controllers.

=== Career with LucasArts ===
By 1990, the home video game market was beginning to blossom, particularly for personal computers. In April of that year, Land obtained a job at the fledgeling Lucasfilm Games (today known as LucasArts), a software company owned by Star Wars creator George Lucas. Land became the first in-house audio programmer and musician at the company, which had mostly outsourced its sound production duties to third-party developer Realtime Associates in the previous few years. Land's first project with LucasArts was The Secret of Monkey Island. The soundtrack of the game gave the composer a chance to show his flexibility, as it is almost entirely made up of Caribbean-flavored themes, something different from anything Land had composed before. His music from Monkey Island has been performed live by a full orchestra at the Symphonic Game Music Concert in 2004. The event took place in Leipzig, Germany.

The sound engine used in Monkey Island bothered Land, however. He found it nearly impossible to synchronize music with action in the game. Land began work on LucasArts' iMUSE interactive music system to solve this problem. The project was more daunting than Land had anticipated, so he brought in his friend, Peter McConnell, to help. The two designed the iMUSE system as an advanced MIDI sequencer, but over the years, it has come to be, as Land describes it, "a methodology" that allows game producers greater control over in-game music, transitions, etc. Land also headed the company sound department, and since he was preoccupied with iMUSE, he hired another friend to the company, Clint Bajakian, to take over some composing projects.

With iMUSE completed, Land returned to work as composer. He worked on several titles, including more Monkey Island games and various projects based on Lucasfilm properties.

Land continues to widen his repertoire, and he is currently studying classical cello and violin. He plans to release an album of music he has written outside of LucasArts sometime in the future.

Michael Land also worked on the Telltale installment of the Monkey Island series, Tales of Monkey Island, and reprises his role in the new Return to Monkey Island with Clint Bajakian and Peter McConnell.

== Musical style and influences ==
During his teen-age years, Land consciously studied and emulated the styles of performers such as Yes, the Grateful Dead, and Jimi Hendrix. To this day, he cites Hendrix's mellow style as a great influence on his own music, and he claims that the Dead's style is deeply rooted in his own work.

In his adult years, he also studied classical composers, particularly Beethoven, a composer whose accomplishments he describes as "a mountain in the distance … no matter how much ground you cover, it's always just as far away." He also developed an interest in Renaissance polyphony.

Land's work shows great variation, a common trait for video game composers. He begins each project by reading over production notes for the game and then deciding on a musical style with the game's producers. Once this is decided, Land listens to different examples of that style. His soundtracks are as varied as the games they accompany. The music of the Monkey Island series is Caribbean in style, tunes performed on light woodwinds and marimbas. On the other hand, his soundtrack for The Dig is cinematic, with dark, brooding themes played out slowly. Land himself cites The Dig score as the work that comes closest to his own personal style. Another trait Land has in common with other video game composers is his ability to compose music that remains listenable when played on a continuous loop.

Land's music also tends to be more ambient in style. This allows him to compose fairly complex pieces but to keep them from being obtrusive to gameplay or spoken dialogue. Each project tends to feature at least a few louder, more melodic pieces, however, usually in the title theme and end credits.

Land's work on The Curse of Monkey Island soundtrack simultaneously marks a compositional coming-of-age, and the advent of digital audio compression meaning that MIDI audio of the past could be replaced with hi-fidelity live audio and live voice recording. This allowed for Land to record the soundtrack with real instruments or high quality patches, which added a warmth and emotion to the music not present in earlier MIDI music.

Land's skills as a composer and arranger are no more evident than in his choice of timbre; bringing together European folk and classical instruments with Caribbean and Central American instruments, weaving a texture that combines steel-pans, accordions, and afro-Cuban percussion amongst others. On one hand, heavily influenced by European nationalist music and nautical shanties and horn pipes, and on the other incorporating Caribbean and Brazilian styles.

== Discography ==
=== Video game soundtracks ===
Title	Year	Notes
The Secret of Monkey Island	1990	With Barney Jones, Patric Mundy, and Andy Newell
Night Shift	1990	Music adaptation
Masterblazer	1990	With Chris Hülsbeck
Secret Weapons of the Luftwaffe	1991	
Monkey Island 2: LeChuck's Revenge	1991	With Clint Bajakian and Peter McConnell
Indiana Jones and the Fate of Atlantis	1992	With Clint Bajakian and Peter McConnell
Star Wars: Rebel Assault	1993	Sound advice
Star Wars: X-Wing	1993	With Clint Bajakian and Peter McConnell
Day of the Tentacle	1993	With Clint Bajakian and Peter McConnell
Sam & Max: Hit the Road	1993	With Clint Bajakian and Peter McConnell
Star Wars: TIE Fighter	1994	With Clint Bajakian and Peter McConnell
Star Wars: Dark Forces	1995	iMUSE Interactive Music System
The Dig	1995	
Full Throttle	1995	iMuse Programming
Afterlife	1996	iMuse Programming
The Curse of Monkey Island	1997	With Hans Christian Reumschuessel
Ballblazer Champions	1997	Sound Consultant
Outlaws	1997	Manager of Sound Development
Herc's Adventures	1997	Music Composition/Manager
Star Wars: DroidWorks	1998	Sound Manager
Grim Fandango	1998	Sound Production Supervision
Star Wars: Jedi Knight - Mysteries of the Sith	1998	Production
Star Wars: X-Wing Alliance	1999	Music editor
Star Wars: Episode I: The Gungan Frontier	1999	Music Editing and additional composition
Star Wars: Episode I: The Phantom Menace	1999	Sound Department Manager
Star Wars: Yoda's Challenge - Activity Center	1999	Sound Department Manager
Star Wars: Episode I: Racer	1999	Sound Department Manager
Star Wars: Anakin's Speedway	1999	Sound Department Manager
Star Wars: Force Commander	2000	Sound Department Manager
Star Wars: Episode I: Jedi Power Battles	2000	Sound Department Manager
Escape from Monkey Island	2000	With Clint Bajakian, Anna Karney, Michael Lande and Peter McConnell
SimCity 4	2003	With various others
The Bard's Tale	2004	With Tommy Tallarico, Clint Bajakian and Jared Emerson-Johnson
Psychonauts	2005	Performed bass
Thrillville	2006	With various others
Tales of Monkey Island	2009	With John Marsden and Jared Emerson-Johnson
The Secret of Monkey Island: Special Edition	2009	Special thanks
Monkey Island 2: LeChuck's Revenge - Special Edition	2010	Special thanks
Wak-a-Rat	2014	
Grim Fandango: Remastered	2015	Sound Production Supervision
Day of the Tentacle: Remastered	2016	Original music
Full Throttle: Remastered	2017	Mr. Big Music Guy
Psychonauts 2	2021	Played electric bass
Return to Monkey Island	2022	With Clint Bajakian and Peter McConnell

=== Other works ===
Title	Year	Notes
POWER GAME HITS - Best of adventure and action computer game tracks	1992	Compilation of music from various LucasArts games
The Best of LucasArts Original Soundtracks	2002	Compilation of music from various LucasArts games
Video Games Live: Level 3	2014	Played keyboards
