= The Dig (video game) =

1995 video game

- The cover artwork for The Dig, displaying the three astronauts in the story
- Developer: LucasArts
- Publisher: LucasArts
- Designers: Sean Clark; Brian Moriarty
- Artist: Bill Tiller
- Writers: Orson Scott Card; Brian Moriarty; Steven Spielberg
- Composer: Michael Land
- Engine: SCUMM (visual); INSANE (cut scenes) iMUSE (audio)
- Platforms: MS-DOS; Mac OS
- Release: November 24, 1995
- Genre: Point-and-click adventure game
- Mode: Single-player

The Dig is a 1995 point-and-click adventure game developed by LucasArts for PC and Macintosh. Like other LucasArts adventure games, it uses the SCUMM video game engine. It is the last SCUMM game on MS-DOS. It features a full voice-acting cast, including voice actors Robert Patrick and Steve Blum, and a digital orchestral score. The game uses a combination of drawn two-dimensional artwork and limited, pre-rendered three-dimensional clips, with the latter created by Industrial Light & Magic.

The game is inspired by an idea originally created for Steven Spielberg's Amazing Stories series. Unlike other LucasArts adventure games, which typically includes humor, The Dig took a somber approach to its science fiction motif. In the game, the player takes the role of Commander Boston Low, part of a five-man team planting explosives on an asteroid in order to avert its collision course with Earth. Discovering the asteroid is hollow, Low and two of his team are transported to a long-abandoned complex, filled with advanced technology, on a strange alien world. Low and his companions must utilize xenoarchaeology to learn how the technology works, discover the fate of the alien race that built it, and solve other mysteries to find a way to return home.

The Dig received mixed-to-positive reviews, with critics primarily praising its atmosphere and soundtrack. Multiple reviewers said the game's puzzles were too difficult, and other aspects, such as its graphics, voice acting, and dialogue, received mixed receptions. A novelization was written by science fiction author Alan Dean Foster in conjunction with the game's development.

== Gameplay ==
The Dig is a point-and-click adventure game, where the player, as Commander Boston Low, uses the mouse cursor to point to people, objects, and other parts of the environment to look at or interact with them, collect and use items in their inventory, and talk to non-player characters. The game runs on the SCUMM game engine, and was the eleventh LucasArts game to do so. A minigame can be found on the communicator menu, consisting of "Asteroid Lander", a Lunar Lander like game. During development, there were plans to include role-playing game elements, but these were scrapped before the game's release.

== Plot ==
A radio telescope detects the approach of a large asteroid on a collision course with Earth; authorities dub it "Attila" after the ancient conqueror Attila the Hun. Scientists determine explosives planted on the surface of the asteroid may divert it into a stable orbit around Earth. A five-person expedition uses the Space Shuttle Atlantis to rendezvous with the asteroid and plant the charges. The crew consists of Commander Boston Low (voiced by Robert Patrick); Dr. Ludger Brink (Steven Blum), a German archaeologist and geologist; Maggie Robbins (Mari Weiss), a linguistics expert and reporter; pilot Ken Borden (David Lodge); and NASA technician Cora Miles (Leilani Jones), who is also running for Congress.

Low, Brink, and Robbins spacewalk to the asteroid and set the charges. While they are successful in altering the orbit of Attila, they find the inside of the asteroid appears hollow, and proceed to explore. When they enter a central chamber, they are trapped as the asteroid transforms into a dodecahedron pod and rapidly accelerates away into deep space. When the three recover and can exit the pod, they find themselves on an alien planet, on a central island surrounded by five smaller, spire-shaped islands; in the game's novelization, they name the planet Cocytus. It shows signs of former intelligent life, but as they explore, they find no evidence of any sentient creatures that remain, and the one advanced complex they are in shows signs of long-term deterioration. They encounter a strange form of spirit-like energy that guides them to a particular patch of ground, which they find to be soft and consistent with an opening that has been buried by time. Shortly after Brink begins digging, the ground gives way beneath him, opening a cavern into a subterranean structure. Robbins and Low find Brink dead at the bottom of the rubble.

View of the center island and five surrounding islands of Cocytus

Robbins insists they explore the structure separately and the two part ways, keeping in contact with their communicators. In what appears to be a museum, Low discovers a pair of crystals containing a glowing green liquid. After seeing a demonstration in the museum of similar crystals being used in what looks like a resurrection ceremony, Low tries one on Brink, bringing him back to life. They search for a means to return to Earth, using Brink's and Robbins' talents for xenoarchaeology to decipher alien text and images.

As the trio continue to explore, they find Brink has become addicted to the crystals and started hoarding them for himself, leading to conflict within the group. Low discovers a pyramid that houses a preserved alien, whom he is able to reanimate by use of the life crystals. Through Robbins, the alien explains that his species had become obsessed with eternal life and had decided to travel to a new universe, Spacetime Six, from the current one, which they call Spacetime Four. The alien chose to remain behind to warn others about the crystals and the dangers of transcending to Spacetime Six. However, the rest of the species have been unable to find a way to return to Spacetime Four, and only they would be able to provide the humans with a spacecraft to return to Earth.

Low offers to travel to Spacetime Six to show the aliens how to return, but this requires them to repower the portal that was used. They are able to retrieve two life crystals from a machine that generates them, but Low and Brink fight over the crystals, and Brink falls to his death. During the process of opening the portal, Robbins is killed. The player has the option of reviving Robbins with a life crystal after the portal is opened; however, if they do, she immediately jumps to her death, with no crystals left to revive her a second time. With no other options, Low uses the portal to meet the rest of the aliens in Spacetime Six; with the portal open, the aliens can perceive the route home and return to Cocytus. They restore Brink and Robbins to life and cure Brink of his addiction to the crystals, though this leaves him as an elderly man. If Low left Robbins dead, she is happy to see him, but if Low revived her, she is angry and scorns him. As promised, the aliens reconstruct a spacecraft for the humans, and representatives of the species join the humans as they return to Earth.

== Development ==
The Dig was originally conceived by Steven Spielberg as an episode of Amazing Stories, and later as a film, but was later concluded that the concept would be prohibitively expensive to film. As a result, the idea was temporarily shelved. Eventually, it was decided the story could be adapted into the adventure game format. The initial video game design meeting was held in 1989 at Skywalker Ranch; it included Spielberg, George Lucas, Ron Gilbert, and Noah Falstein, the latter two of whom had created a video game based on Indiana Jones and the Last Crusade that had impressed Spielberg. Writing is credited to Spielberg, author Orson Scott Card, who wrote the dialogue, and interactive fiction author Brian Moriarty, whose previous LucasArts engagement was with Loom. Industrial Light & Magic (ILM) created some of the CG imagery.

The Dig had by far the longest development time of all LucasArts adventure games. The game's design team met for the first time at the Skywalker Ranch on the day the 1989 San Francisco earthquake struck. The game was not released until 1995. During its development there were four successive project leaders, starting with Falstein, followed by Moriarty, then Dave Grossman. The Dig's final project leader was LucasArts' Sean Clark.

The original production involved a story that took place in the distant future. In this story, a crew of explorers in a spaceship visit an abandoned planet, discovering signs of an extraterrestrial civilization that left behind technological artifacts. The explorers initially assume that the occupants of the planet had died off, seeing no sign of them, but as the story progresses, the player was meant to discover something very different. This premise is similar to the finished game's story, but contains clear differences.

When Moriarty took over, he decided to start again from scratch. This version of the production was more similar to the released game, but it contained one extra character: a Japanese business tycoon and science-hobbyist named Toshi Olema, who uses his money to buy his way onto the Attila project crew. Toshi would have met a gruesome death when he stumbled into a cavern with acid dripping from the ceiling, and the other astronauts would have been unable to safely retrieve his body and bring him back with life crystals. He was later removed from the story. This version of the game was very bloody and intended for an adult audience. Initially, Spielberg thought this feel was very fitting. After the release of Jurassic Park in 1993, Spielberg received numerous complaints from parents who had ignored the PG-13 rating and brought their young children to see the film, only to discover that it contained some sequences of horror, blood, and violence. Thus, worrying that parents would make a similar mistake and purchase The Dig for their children, Spielberg requested the violence be toned down. Other notable design ideas which were dropped during the game's production include a survival game angle, which forced the player to keep water and food supplies for life support, and exploration of cities on the planet. Although The Dig was announced for release in Q2 1992, it ultimately did not launch until December 1995.

The game was re-released using the Steam content delivery system on July 8, 2009.

== Soundtrack ==
The Dig soundtrack

Soundtrack album by Michael Land
- Released: January 23, 1996
- Recorded: 1995
- Genre: Ambient
- Length: 40:22
- Label: Angel Records
- Producer: Michael Land

Final project leader Sean Clark said the music of The Dig was crucial in "establishing the overall mood of the piece". During production, LucasArts desired a soundtrack with a "Wagnerian" feeling. Composed by Michael Land, the music consisted of Land's original score performed on a Kurzweil K2000 synthesizer, enriched by hundreds of short chord samples from the works of Wagner. Land cited the music he personally composed for The Dig as the type closest to his own individual style.

The music is relatively static during most of the game, used more as a backdrop than a prominent aspect of gameplay, and has been described as consisting mostly of "vague cadenzas, modulations and movements without much consequence for the material". When important sequences and cut scenes occur, however, the music comes to the forefront and becomes significantly more dynamic.

The Dig was the first LucasArts game to have its soundtrack sold separately as an audio CD, adapted as a linear continuity of finite pieces. Land played the piano and synthesizer and produced the album. He was assisted by Hans Christian Reumschüssel (cello), Emily Bezar (vocals), and Paul McCandless (woodwinds). The soundtrack was bundled with a CD-ROM that included demos for five LucasArts games, and was intended as a first step in cross-promotional efforts.

The Dig soundtrack (1996)
No.	Title	Length
1.	"Mission to the Asteroid"	9:54
2.	"Another World"	3:33
3.	"Ghosts"	1:48
4.	"The Ancient City"	3:42
5.	"Underwater Cavern"	2:12
6.	"A River Canyon"	4:11
7.	"The Madness of the Crystals"	2:21
8.	"Tomb of the Past"	2:10
9.	"The Monument"	2:47
10.	"Dimensions in Time"	4:00
11.	"Cathedral of the Lost"	3:35
Total length:		40:22

== Reception ==
Reception

Review scores
Publication	Score
Adventure Gamers	3/5
AllGame	4/5 (PC); 4.5/5 (MAC)
Edge	8 out of 10 (PC)
GameSpot	4.5 out of 10 (PC)
GameZone	B
Next Generation	4/5 (PC)
PC Gamer (US)	88%
Maximum	4/5 (PC)
PC Magazine	3/4
Computer Game Review	83/80/79
PC Games	B
MacUser	3/5

According to LucasArts, The Dig's global sales reached 300,000 copies by early 1998, the highest sales of a LucasArts adventure title at the time of its release. However, the company's Bill Tiller later said that upper management considered it a commercial letdown, and speculated that its "budget had run so high that it couldn't make its money back." He remarked, "The whole project had been way over hyped. I think Lucas Arts management thought it would make a bazillion dollars, and when it sold a substantial amount less than a bazillion dollars, they were disappointed."

The Dig's graphics, voice acting, and writing were given an uneven reception by critics. Its puzzles were generally viewed as more difficult than most LucasArts games. However, the cut scenes were more favorably received, and the music was universally praised.

Evan Dickens of Adventure Gamers stated, "The Dig is a lot more reminiscent of Myst than any other LucasArts adventure." He said the game was a bit too difficult, with very challenging puzzles. A reviewer for Next Generation similarly said that the puzzles were generally more frustrating than in other LucasArts games, citing as an example a door puzzle for which the clues "are so confusingly drawn" that the player ultimately must use trial and error. GameSpot's Jeffrey Adam Young agreed, saying of the puzzles, "some follow logic, others just call for trial and error, and yet others will leave you clueless". A reviewer for Maximum disagreed, saying that "with the exception of one or two that were just too obscure, [the puzzles are] set at just the right level to keep a serious adventure freak riveted (and not too hacked off)." Joshua Roberts of Allgame praised the puzzles, saying there were "only a few real brain twisters" and that most could be solved with patience and consideration. Bernard H. Yee of PC Magazine said that some of the puzzles were "a bit more frustrating than others".

Dickens noted that the graphics looked a bit dated. Roberts was more complimentary, saying, "You'll be impressed with the scope of the alien landscape". Next Generation praised the visuals as becoming "more and more bizarre" as Low goes deeper into the alien world. The reviewer for Maximum acknowledged that the graphics were stylistically outdated, but still considered them "stunning". Young called the character animations "tired" and "lo-res". Yee was also unimpressed, saying the graphics are "a bit blocky" and commenting that the characters "lack fine detail". Dickens felt the cut scenes animated by ILM were excellent, as did Yee, who said they have a "truly grand, cinematic feel".

Dickens had mixed feelings about the game's audio, calling its score "majestic" and saying it was the best part of the game. At the same time, he thought the voice acting was "mediocre", saying Robert Patrick was the right voice for protagonist Boston Low, but that he missed some emotional nuances in his portrayal. Young thought the voice acting was acceptable but "stereotypical." He also noted the "grand music score" as the highlight of the game. Yee called the voice acting "top notch" and compared it favorably with Full Throttle.

Dickens thought the writing was hit and miss, panning the dialogue as "relentlessly cheesy and clichéd", but approving of the overall storyline and its suspenseful atmosphere. The reviewer for Maximum noted that the story has a much more serious tone than LucasArts' usual wacky fare, and praised the "well developed storyline and characters". Young commented that the game takes itself too seriously to be as enjoyable as other, funnier LucasArts games such as Full Throttle, and said the dialogue was "deplorable". Roberts disagreed, calling it "excellent" and saying Low was a "likable" character.

Yee summarized his review by saying, "The Dig brings otherworldly adventure, a real sense of exploration, and a true cinematic style to your earthbound PC." Young said, "In almost every sense, The Dig represents a leap backwards from LucasArts' previous group of adventure games." Next Generation's reviewer assessed, "Although it's not perfect, The Dig is yet another solid graphic adventure [from LucasArts] with some great attributes." Maximum stated "We have no hesitation in recommending this to all adventure fanatics, though inexperienced adventurers may want to wet their feet with something a little less taxing the first time out." Roberts concluded his review by saying, "The Dig is the kind of adventure we've all come to expect from LucasArts. With an imaginative story, an attractive visual backdrop and a wealth of intelligent puzzles, it belongs near the top of the adventure game class." Dickens recommended The Dig to science fiction fans more than average gamers.

Its soundtrack was well received. Chris Greening of Square Enix Music Online gave the soundtrack 9 out of 10, calling it "accessible yet abstract, simple yet deep". About "Mission to the Asteroid", the opening song, he wrote, "Much of the composition conveys beauty and serenity, yet there is a certain tragic element created with the sweeping chord changes and sometimes elegiac motifs". He noted that while much of the album is quite ambient and subdued, it contains numerous subtle variations in its themes. He concluded by saying the album is "surprisingly fulfilling even on a stand-alone basis" and that it "never fails to immerse and fascinate me".

Pyramid magazine reviewed The Dig and stated that "The combination of excellent graphic detail, a gorgeous musical soundtrack, an interesting plot, and strong, believable characters make The Dig one of the most engaging, fun, and addictive adventures I've ever played."

In 2011, Adventure Gamers rated The Dig at No. 92 on its list of the 100 best adventure games of all time, noting that gamers did not know what to make of the game at the time of its release, but adding, "Strip away the preconceptions, however, and what’s left is a very good game in its own right". In 1996, GamesMaster ranked The Dig 75th on their "Top 100 Games of All Time."

== Novel ==
Science fiction author Alan Dean Foster, known for having written novelizations of films such as Star Wars and Alien 3, wrote a novel based on The Dig. An audiobook version of the novel was also released.

The novel is not completely consistent with the game, and sections of the story are presented from the point-of-view of the indigenous alien civilization, something not seen in the game. The novel also provides some background detail (such as the reaction on Earth after the discovery of Attila), in addition to explaining several mysteries left unexplored in the game.

Publishers Weekly panned the novelization, claiming it was severely restricted by the fact that it was based on a computer game, in which the hero merely collects objects and solves puzzles. The review also said it suffered from stereotypical characters and a "simplistic metaphysics", again blamed on its computer game origins.
