= IMUSE =

Music system used in video games

iMUSE
- Developers: Michael Land, Peter McConnell
- Type: Game engine
- License: Proprietary
- Website: U.S. patent 5,315,057

iMUSE (Interactive Music Streaming Engine) is an interactive music system used in a number of LucasArts video games. The idea behind iMUSE is to synchronize music with the visual action in a video game so that the audio continuously matches the on-screen events and transitions from one musical theme to another are done seamlessly. iMUSE was developed in the early 1990s by composers Michael Land and Peter McConnell while working at LucasArts. The iMUSE system was patented by LucasArts in 1994, after being added to the fifth version of the SCUMM game engine in 1991.

== Development ==
iMUSE was developed out of Michael Land's frustration for the audio system used by LucasArts while composing The Secret of Monkey Island. His goal was to create a system which would enable the composer to set the mood via music according to the events of the game. The project was much more daring than he had imagined. He brought in an old friend, Peter McConnell, to collaborate on creating the system, which they later patented together. iMUSE was also found to be useful to account for differences in processing speed between personal computers at the time, as there was no direct means of synchronizing sound with gameplay rendering. To account for this, the iMUSE system acts as a pit orchestra, according to McConnell, playing back shorter or longer sections of music while waiting for key events to occur within the game's drawing engine.

The first game to use the iMUSE system was Monkey Island 2: LeChuck's Revenge, and it has been used in all LucasArts adventure games since. It has also been used for some non-adventure LucasArts titles such as the DOS versions of Star Wars: TIE Fighter and Dark Forces.

== Usage ==
One often cited example of the iMUSE system is at the very beginning of Monkey Island 2 where Guybrush finds himself in Woodtick, the small town on Scabb Island. Whenever Guybrush walks into a building, a variation of the Woodtick theme plays, each with a different instrument. When Guybrush then walks out again the music has a closing flourish that leads back into the basic Woodtick theme.

== See also ==
- INSANE (engine)
