= Jonathan Ackley =

American video game designer

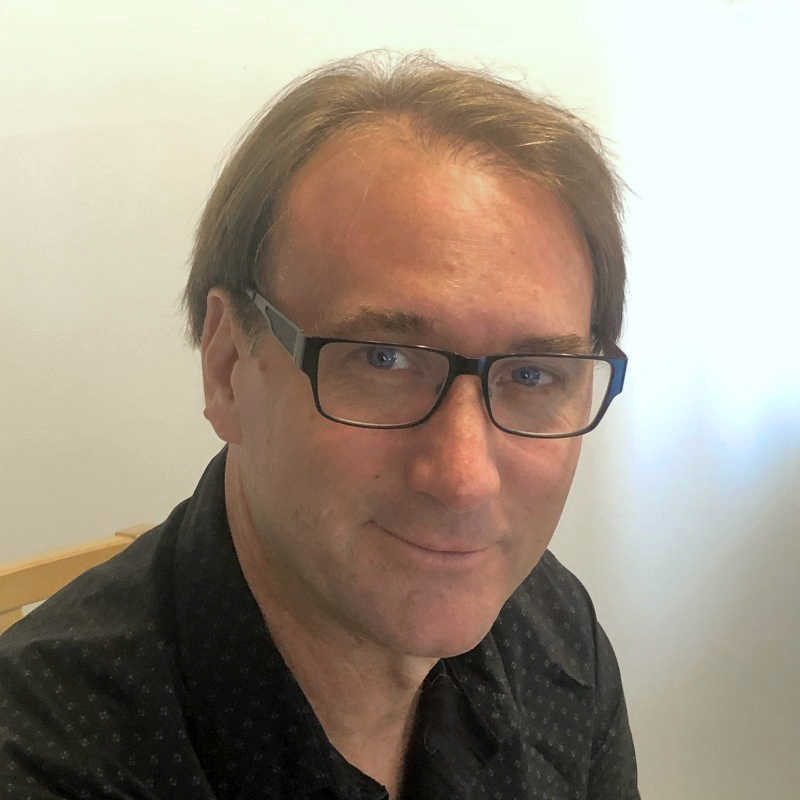
- Ackley in 2021
- Born: United States
- Occupations: Game designer, writer, programmer

Jonathan Ackley is an American interactive theme park attraction and computer game designer, writer, and programmer. He is best known for being the Creative Director and Producer on Walt Disney World's Sorcerers of the Magic Kingdom and co-project leader, with Larry Ahern, for LucasArts Games The Curse of Monkey Island.

He is an inventor who holds or co-holds more than 35 patents, including for novel game interfaces, theme park systems, rides and attractions, interactive merchandise, RFID, bar codes, consumer media platforms, mobile-powered reservation systems, and parental controls for cellular phones.

== Career ==
Jonathan Ackley began his career as a programmer at LucasArts on Day of the Tentacle in 1993.

He was co-project leader on The Curse of Monkey Island in 1997, an animated pirate adventure that received critical acclaim. The Curse of Monkey Island was nominated for or won many industry awards, including "best adventure game of 1997" by Computer Games Strategy Plus, Computer Gaming World, and PC Gamer US, and GameSpot, which said "The Curse of Monkey Island has all the makings of a classic."

He worked as an associate game designer for Rocket Science Games on Cadillacs and Dinosaurs: The Second Cataclysm in 1994. While there, he was an Associate Game Designer and also a voice actor for the game Loadstar: The Legend of Tully Bodine, playing the role of "Scorpion."

For Mindstorms, the LEGO company's flagship toy robotics line, Ackley crafted the interfaces for Mindstorms' "Robotics Invention System 2.0" and "Mindstorms Vision Command."

Starting in 2001, Mr. Ackley joined Walt Disney Imagineering creating interactive entertainment for their amusement parks. In this function, he co-designed Walt Disney World's Sorcerers of the Magic Kingdom with his former Curse of Monkey Island co-lead, Larry Ahern, in 2012. "Insidethemagic.net" called him the "Sorcerer behind 'Sorcerers'" in a 2012 interview with Ackley.

As a Disney Imagineer, Ackley played a major design role in a number of innovative attractions. These included:

- Led the technology team for the Disney Company's Interactive Television Platform.
- Designer and Producer for the THEA Award-winning Kim Possible's World Showcase Adventure at EPCOT. This successful in-park high-tech scavenger hunt was later re-imagined as "Agent P's World Showcase Adventure with Phineas and Ferb," which also met with critical and popular acclaim. In a June 2012 interview, Ackley said of the "Agent P" experience, "From a WDI standpoint, the focus is always on the storyline and not the technology."
- Designed the Leonardo Challenge at Tokyo Disney Sea
- Was a show writer for the interactive queue at the Haunted Mansion at the Magic Kingdom
- Designed the Midship Detective Agency game on the Disney Cruise ships
- Designed and Produced The Sorcerers of the Magic Kingdom in the Magic Kingdom Park
- Designed and Produced the attraction "A Pirate's Adventure - Treasure of the Seven Seas" at the Magic Kingdom park
- Designed and wrote the Menehune Adventure Trail game at the Disney Aulani Resort and Spa on Oahu. Ackley and colleague Chris Purvis discussed the game in a panel at the Game Developer's Conference.
- Was the Executive Creative Director for the Play Disney Parks mobile application, delivering interactive theme park content to visitors to Disney's US resorts. A reviewer for familychoiceawards.com said of the app, " It makes exploring and enjoying Walt Disney World and Disneyland Resort even more fun, if you can believe that."
- Was Executive Creative Director for the Disney Team of Heroes, a mobile application designed to "(bring) joy to patients at Children’s Hospitals."

The New York Film Academy Game Design hosted Ackley for a 2019 in conversation as part of its "Masters of Game Design" series.

At the beginning of 2021, Ackley left the Walt Disney Company after nearly two decades of work. Most recently he has joined the mixed reality studio Animal Repair Shop as its Vice President of Product Innovation.

== Ludography ==
Video Game Credits
Year	Game	Role	Studio
1993	Day of the Tentacle	Programmer	LucasArts
1993	Sam & Max Hit the Road	Programmer	LucasArts
1994	Cadillacs and Dinosaurs: The Second Cataclysm	Associate game designer	Rocket Science Games
1994	Loadstar: The Legend of Tully Bodine	Associate Game Designer and voice actor, character "Scorpion"	Rocket Science Games
1995	Full Throttle	Programmer	LucasArts
1995	The Dig	Programmer	LucasArts
1997	The Curse of Monkey Island	Co-project leader	LucasArts
2012	Sorcerers of the Magic Kingdom	Co-designer	The Walt Disney Company

1997-2020: See list above for major projects for the Walt Disney Company
