= Cyberpunk 2077 =

2020 video game

- Developer: CD Projekt Red
- Publisher: CD Projekt
- Directors: Adam Badowski; Konrad Tomaszkiewicz; Gabriel Amatangelo
- Producers: Konrad Tomaszkiewicz; Jędrzej Mróz; Przemysław Wójcik; Michał Stec
- Designers: Grzegorz Mocarski; Mateusz Kanik; Mateusz Tomaszkiewicz; Paweł Sasko
- Programmers: Piotr Tomsiński; Kacper Kościeński
- Writers: Marcin Blacha; Tomasz Marchewka
- Composers: P. T. Adamczyk; Marcin Przybyłowicz; Paul Leonard-Morgan
- Series: Cyberpunk
- Engine: REDengine 4
- Platforms: PlayStation 4; Stadia; Windows; Xbox One; PlayStation 5; Xbox Series X/S; Nintendo Switch 2; macOS
- Release: PlayStation 4, Stadia, Windows, Xbox One; 10 December 2020; PlayStation 5, Xbox Series X/S; 15 February 2022; Nintendo Switch 2; 5 June 2025; macOS; 17 July 2025
- Genre: Action role-playing
- Mode: Single-player

Cyberpunk 2077 is a 2020 action role-playing game developed by CD Projekt Red and published by CD Projekt. Based on and set in the fictional universe of Mike Pondsmith's Cyberpunk tabletop game series, Cyberpunk 2077 takes place in the dystopian metropolis of Night City in California. The player assumes the role of V (voiced by Gavin Drea or Cherami Leigh depending on the player character's gender), a cybernetically-enhanced mercenary who is reluctantly imbued with an experimental "biochip" containing the engram of legendary rocker-turned-terrorist Johnny Silverhand (voiced by Keanu Reeves). As Johnny's consciousness begins overwriting V's own, the two must work together to separate from each other and save V's life by confronting the Arasaka Corporation, a powerful megacorporation acting as the de facto ruler of Night City.

Cyberpunk 2077 began development following the release of The Witcher 3: Wild Hunt – Blood and Wine (2016). The game was developed by a team of around 500 people using the REDengine 4 game engine. CD Projekt launched a new division in Wrocław, Poland, and partnered with Digital Scapes, Nvidia, Q-LOC, and Jali Research to aid the production, while Pondsmith served as a consultant. The original score was composed by Marcin Przybyłowicz, and featured the contributions of several licensed artists. After years of anticipation, Cyberpunk 2077 was released for PlayStation 4, Stadia, Windows, and Xbox One in December 2020, followed by the PlayStation 5 and Xbox Series X/S in February 2022, the Nintendo Switch 2 in June 2025 as a launch title, and macOS in July 2025. A DLC expansion, Phantom Liberty, was released for PlayStation 5, Windows, and Xbox Series X/S in September 2023, and paired with the Nintendo Switch 2 and macOS releases.

Cyberpunk 2077 received praise from critics for its narrative, setting, and graphics, but was widely criticised for bugs and glitches, particularly on the PlayStation 4 and Xbox One versions during their launch period. Sony removed the game from the PlayStation Store from December 2020 to June 2021 while CD Projekt rectified some of the issues. CD Projekt became subject to investigations and class-action lawsuits for its perceived attempts at downplaying the severity of the technical problems before release; these were ultimately cleared with a settlement of US$1.85 million. The improvements and updates delivered by the developer since, together with the release of Phantom Liberty and the 2022 tie-in anime series Cyberpunk: Edgerunners, led to a progressive reappraisal of the game.

As of July 2026, Cyberpunk 2077 had sold over 40 million copies, making it one of the best-selling video games of all time. (Note: Attributed to multiple references.) Its total cost to develop and market (including updates and DLC) is reportedly between $436 million and around $440–441 million, making it one of the most expensive video games to develop. (Note: Attributed to multiple references.) A sequel was announced in October 2022 and is in development.

== Gameplay ==
Cyberpunk 2077 is an action role-playing game played from a first-person perspective as V, a mercenary whose voice, face, hairstyle, body type and modifications, background, and clothing are customisable. The game features five core attributes (Body, Intelligence, Reflexes, Technical Ability, and Cool), which players can develop to suit their preferred playstyle. The Phantom Liberty expansion introduces a separate Relic skill tree, which uses Relic points to unlock additional abilities.

In the game, players choose from three life paths: Nomad, Street Kid, or Corpo. These choices establish V's background and determine their starting location, prologue mission, and initial clothing. While life paths do not grant advantages in perks, attributes, or levelling, they unlock unique dialogue options based on V’s history. For instance, the Street Kid path starts in Heywood and offers extensive knowledge of Night City’s streets and gangs. The Corpo path begins in the City Center, providing V with the expertise needed to deal with the upper echelon of the corporate world. Finally, the Nomad path starts in the Badlands, featuring a V who is an outsider to the city with specific knowledge regarding the acquisition and transport of corporate goods.

The gameplay is flexible: the two primary play styles are Netrunner (hacking) and Solo (combat). V has a number of maneuvers to reposition in combat, including sprinting, taking cover, double-jumping, and sliding; many of these abilities can be unlocked or upgraded through cyberware implants installed by a "ripperdoc". Weapon use increases accuracy and reloading speed, which are reflected in character animations. Equipment, such as weapons and armour, is governed by a colored tier system, and is split into melee and ranged options. Melee strikes can be dealt with close-combat weapons. There are three types of ranged weapons, all of which can be customised and modified—Power (with ricocheting bullets), Tech (which penetrates walls and enemies), and Smart (with homing bullets, only usable with specific cyberware). The game has four types of damage that can be inflicted and resisted—Physical, Thermal, Electric, and Toxic. The game can be completed without killing anyone (not including robots), with non-lethal options for weapons and cyberware.

Gameplay screenshot of the player-character completing a mission

The open world metropolis of Night City consists of seven regions: the corporate City Center, immigrant-inhabited Watson, luxurious Westbrook, inner-city Heywood, gang-infested Pacifica, the industrial suburbs of Santo Domingo, and the breakaway Dogtown in the Phantom Liberty expansion. Its surrounding area, the Badlands, can also be explored. Cyberpunk 2077 enables players to control their character from a first-person perspective. By default, a third-person perspective is only available while driving or during specific, rare moments in the story. V owns an apartment and has access to a garage, and can purchase four additional apartments throughout the city. There is a full day-night cycle and dynamic weather, which affects the way non-player characters (NPCs) behave. Depending on the location, law enforcement may be alerted if V commits a crime. Pedestrians are vulnerable to vehicular collisions and gunfire. Radio stations are available to listen to. Night City features many non-English-speaking characters, whose languages can be translated with special implants. V also periodically uses a "Braindance"; a technology that allows one to undergo other people's experiences.

Branching dialogues enable interaction with NPCs and actions in quests, and the player's in-game choices can lead to different endings. Experience points are obtained from main quests and used to upgrade stats; side quests yield "street cred", unlocking skills, vendors, places, and additional quests. Quests are assigned by characters known as Fixers, shady underworld middlemen who specialise in information brokering and smuggling. Throughout the game, V is helped by various companions. Consumables, such as food, drinks, and drugs, are used for healing and temporary enhancements, and objects can be inspected in V's inventory. Minigames include hacking, boxing, auto racing, martial arts, and shooting ranges.

== Synopsis ==
=== Characters and setting ===
Cyberpunk 2077 takes place in Night City (NC), an independent megacity and city-state situated between the U.S. states of North California and South California, which functions as a corporatocracy unaffected by federal or state legislation; the city was founded in the early 1990s and has continued to progress since. The city suffers from rampant gang violence, and corporate warfare, exacerbated by an ineffectual, corrupt municipal government, and police force. Night City relies on robotic technology for everyday functions such as waste management, building and infrastructure maintenance, and public transportation. The city's architecture and fashions are derived from the four aesthetics eras it underwent—Entropism, Kitsch, Neo-Militarism, and Neo-Kitsch. Homelessness and poverty are widespread in the city but does not preclude cybernetic modification for Night City's underclasses, leading to both cosmetic addiction and high levels of violence. Those whose addictions and heavy modifications have rendered them mentally unstable, known as cyberpsychos, are dealt with by the police tactical unit MaxTac. Privatized health corporations such as Trauma Team utilise paramilitary doctors for rapid medical services. Due to the constant threat of physical harm, open carry is permitted for all residents of Night City.

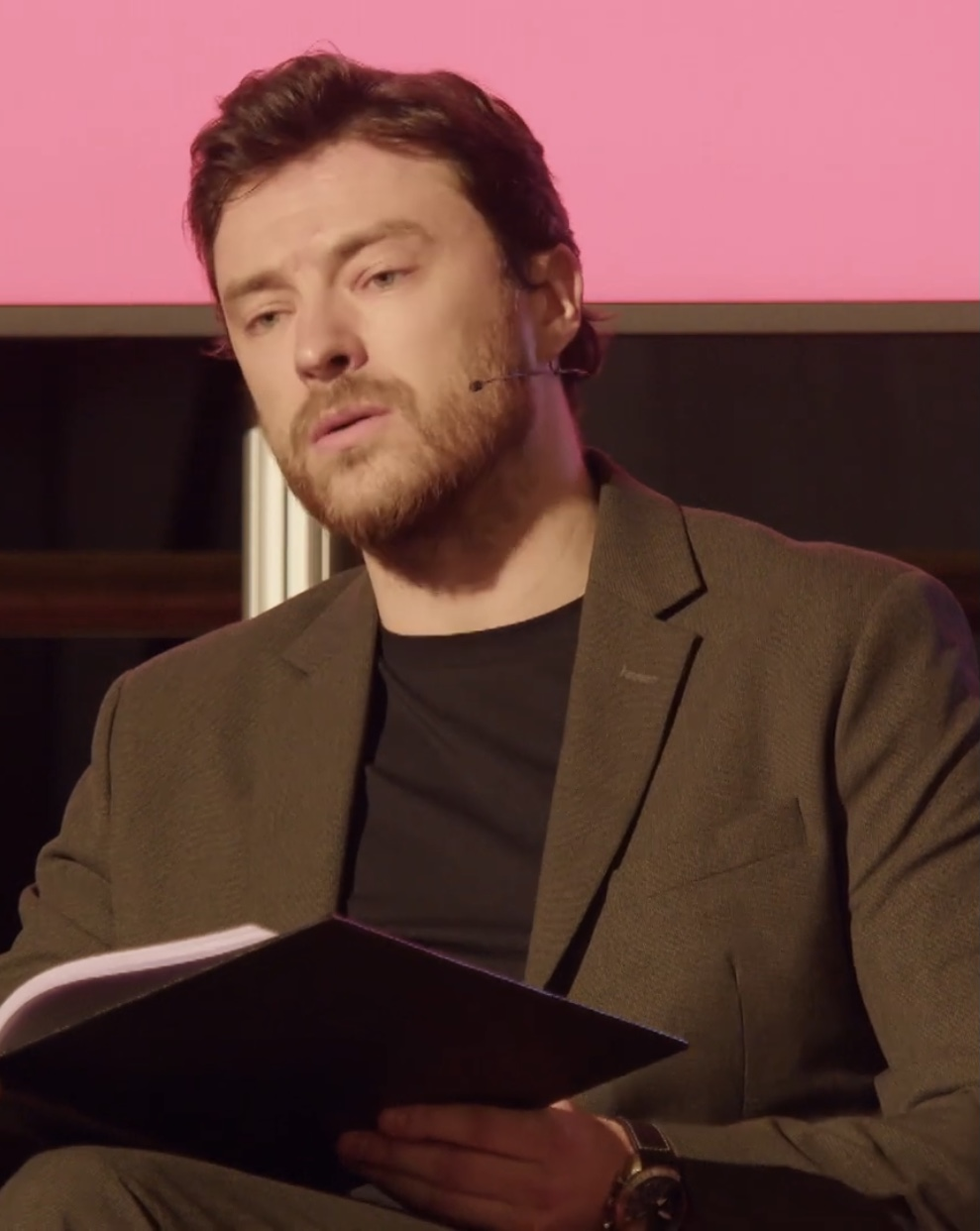
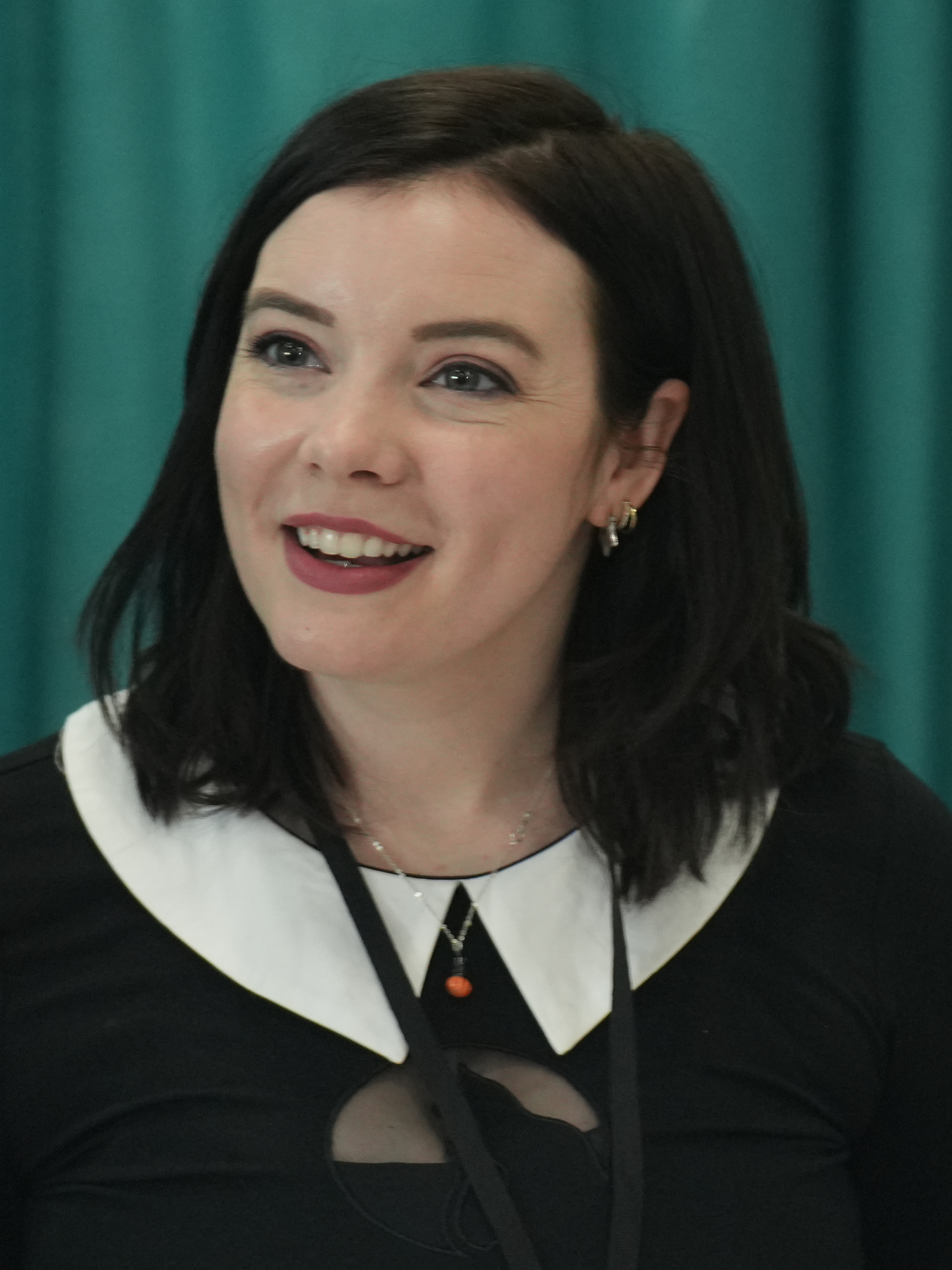
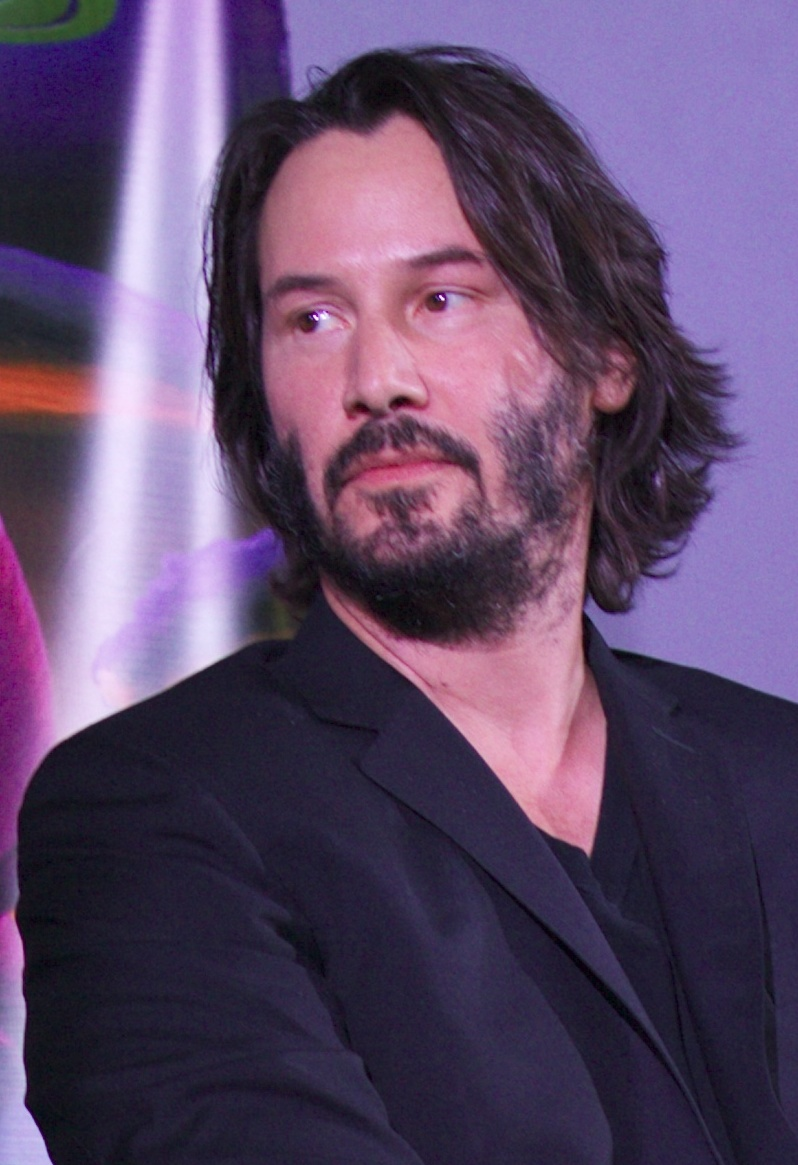
Gavin Drea, Cherami Leigh, and Keanu Reeves (from left to right) voice Vincent (male V), Valerie (female V), and Johnny Silverhand respectively.

The primary protagonist of Cyberpunk 2077 is Vincent / Valerie, known as V (Gavin Drea or Cherami Leigh), a freelance mercenary whose background changes based on player choice. V is accompanied by Johnny Silverhand (Keanu Reeves), a legendary rock star and terrorist who now exists as a digitised engram; Johnny is also playable during some segments of the game. Throughout the main story, V and Johnny come into contact with several major allies and enemies, including Jackie Welles (Jason Hightower), V's best friend and fellow mercenary; T-Bug (Cynthia McWilliams), a netrunner who provides support to V and Jackie; Viktor "Vik" Vector (Michael Gregory), a ripperdoc who maintains a close friendship with V; Misty Olszewski (Erica Lindbeck), Jackie's girlfriend who runs an esoterica store; Dexter "Dex" DeShawn (Michael-Leon Wooley), a local fixer in Night City; Evelyn Parker (Kari Wahlgren), a prostitute who partners with Dex and V's crew to organise a heist; Judy Álvarez (Carla Tassara), Evelyn's friend and a braindance editor who helps V in their investigations; Saburo Arasaka (Masane Tsukayama), the founder of the Arasaka Corporation; Yorinobu Arasaka (Hideo Kimura), Saburo's youngest son; Hanako Arasaka (Alpha Takahashi), Yorinobu's sister and Saburo's only daughter; Goro Takemura (Rome Kanda), Saburo's personal bodyguard; Rogue Amendiares (Jane Perry), the owner of the Afterlife nightclub and one of Johnny's former partners; Panam Palmer (Emily Woo Zeller), a nomad from the Aldecaldos clan; Saul Bright (Diarmaid Murtagh), the leader of the Aldecaldos; Alt Cunningham (Alix Wilton Regan), a netrunner and Johnny's ex-girlfriend who became an artificial intelligence construct; and Adam Smasher (Alec Newman), Arasaka's ruthless and fully-cybernetic head of security.

=== Plot ===
The game opens with one of three lifepaths for the player character V—Nomad, Streetkid, or Corpo—each leading to a partnership with street thug Jackie Welles and netrunner T-Bug as mercenaries in Night City. “Freedom fighting for liberation of life and destruction of corpos.”

In 2077, fixer Dex DeShawn hires V, Jackie and T-Bug to steal a biochip called "the Relic" from the Arasaka Corporation. The heist goes awry when they witness Yorinobu Arasaka murder his father Saburo and frame it as poisoning. During their escape, T-Bug and Jackie are killed while the Relic's case is damaged, forcing V to slot the chip into their head. Dex shoots V and leaves them for dead to cover his tracks.

V awakens in a landfill, haunted by the memories of rocker-turned-terrorist Johnny Silverhand, who died carrying out an assault on Arasaka Tower in 2023. Goro Takemura, Saburo's bodyguard who suspects the truth, kills Dex and rescues V to use them as proof that Yorinobu murdered Saburo. Ripperdoc Viktor Vektor reveals that the Relic contains Johnny's engram and is responsible for reviving V, but is slowly overwriting V's mind with Johnny's consciousness, leaving V with a limited time to live.

Although Johnny is initially antagonistic, he resolves to help V search for a cure, seeking an opportunity to take down Arasaka. V pursues two leads: capturing Anders Hellman, the creator of the Relic, with the help of nomad Panam Palmer and the Aldecaldos clan; and rescuing Evelyn Parker, who commissioned the heist. Hellman is caught but is unable to help V, and later given up to Takemura. With aid from Evelyn's friend Judy Álvarez, V learns Evelyn was hacked and sold to "Scavs", a group known for kidnapping and harvesting cybernetics from people, who also abused her. Using Evelyn's braindance memories, V discovers she learned of the Relic from the Voodoo Boys; a gang of very private netrunners, who wanted Johnny's engram to reach beyond the Blackwall; a firewall that protects the internet and world from rogue AIs.

Through them, V relives Johnny's perceived past. In 2013, Johnny's girlfriend Alt Cunningham created Soulkiller, an AI that transfers minds into cyberspace but destroys the brain. Arasaka used Soulkiller on Alt, imprisoning her in their digital fortress, Mikoshi. Johnny's later nuclear attack freed her, allowing her to escape into the Blackwall and become an AI, but resulted in his own death and upload via Soulkiller. Arasaka's "Secure Your Soul" program and the Relic stem from this technology. V communicates with Alt's consciousness beyond the Blackwall and strikes a deal: if V grants her access to Arasaka's subnet and Mikoshi, she can separate V and Johnny.

Separately, Takemura resolves to take his information to the Arasaka executives. He and V capture Hanako Arasaka, Yorinobu's sister, to prove his guilt, but V is forced to flee after Arasaka soldiers attack. Following the ambush, Hanako reaches out to V and offers to help them in exchange for their assistance in ousting Yorinobu, which Johnny greatly opposes.

In the final act, V must choose to either assault Arasaka Tower, accept Hanako's offer, or commit suicide. The attack can be carried out solo, with Rogue (Johnny takes control of V's body in this scenario), or with the Aldecaldos. Alternatively, siding with Hanako successfully ousts Yorinobu and sees Arasaka remove and destroy the Relic. All paths except suicide involve V fighting and defeating Adam Smasher, Arasaka's fully-cybernetic enforcer.

Regardless, due to the engram's prolonged presence in V's body, the biochip's effects are irreversible. The results leave V with a shorter lifespan in their own body but could offer Johnny a full life, as the Relic has tailored the body for him. Depending on the player's choice, V either uploads their own engram to Mikoshi awaiting a new body (accessible only if they accept Hanako's offer), lives on in their current body with a shortened lifespan while seeking means to undo the damage, or permanently surrenders their body to Johnny and go beyond the Blackwall alongside Alt (accessible only if they attack Arasaka Tower) with Johnny leaving Night City afterwards to start anew.

== Development ==
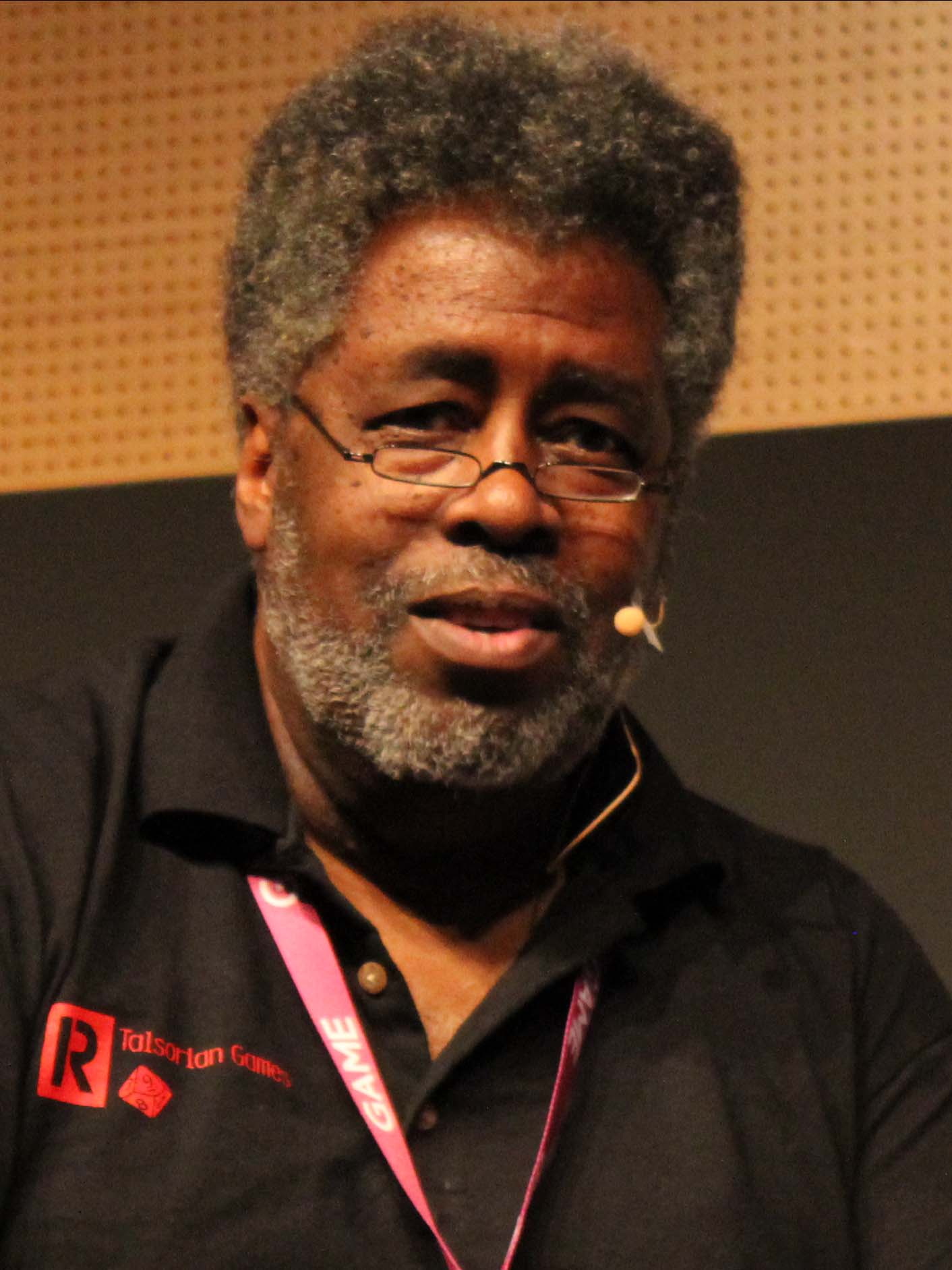
Mike Pondsmith was consulted by CD Projekt Red on the development of Cyberpunk 2077's story.

Preliminary work on Cyberpunk 2077 began following the release of The Witcher 2: Assassins of Kings Enhanced Edition (2012). CD Projekt Red—CD Projekt's internal development studio—approached Mike Pondsmith, the writer of Cyberpunk and founder of R. Talsorian Games, in early 2012, sending him a copy of The Witcher 2: Assassins of Kings (2011). Impressed with the studio's unparalleled knowledge of the Cyberpunk universe at the time, Pondsmith and CD Projekt Red reached an agreement to license Cyberpunk's story from the year 2077 onward to CD Projekt Red, while Pondsmith retained the rights for media in the Cyberpunk universe set up until the year 2077. To ensure Cyberpunk's story remained cohesive during development, Pondsmith served as a consultant on the game. He also provided the voice for the DJ of an in-game radio station. Pondsmith's experience at Microsoft developing games such as Crimson Skies (2000) and Blood Wake (2001), and at Monolith Productions developing The Matrix Online (2005), provided valuable wisdom to CD Projekt Red, in comparison to Polish writer Andrzej Sapkowski's indifference towards the studio during the development of The Witcher (2007) and The Witcher 2.

=== Concept ===
The concept of Cyberpunk 2077 was adapted from Pondsmith's Cyberpunk series. Antithetical to the stereotypical cyberpunk genre, the concepts explored in Cyberpunk evoke a sense of rebellion and whimsy while retaining the genre's grim tone. The protagonist of Cyberpunk—unlike the typical archetype of a hero attempting to save the world—attempts to save themself from a downtrodden perspective. Lead gameplay designer Marcin Janiszewski sought to remind players of its connection to the Cyberpunk universe, writing, "We want to assure fans of the pen-and-paper game that this is still the same Cyberpunk you know". In comparison to CD Projekt Red's development on The Witcher series, the time difference between the events of Cyberpunk and Cyberpunk 2077 allotted the studio more freedom towards adapting the series, although they attempted to stay true to Pondsmith's original works.

Cyberpunk 2077, by extension, presents an alternate history, in which the United States became mired in wars in Central America in the 1980s deeply undermining its power and economy, the Soviet Union failed to dissolve and Japan became a superpower, diffusing its culture as far as California. The events of Cyberpunk 2077 take place in the fictitious Night City, a megalopolis immersed in Japanese culture that lies between Los Angeles and San Francisco. Stereotypical cyberpunk motifs, such as sadism, commercialisation, cruelty, and satisfaction, remain as mainstays in the political landscape of Night City. A hedonistic wonderland, Night City is divided into two distinct classes: the downtrodden, who use psychedelic substances and physically augmented sex workers as a form of escapism, while the elite corporate class (known as "corpos") dominate society and are afforded great financial success. The script was first written in Polish and translated into English, a standard practice for CD Projekt Red's games, according to quest director Mateusz Tomaszkiewicz.

=== Game design ===
CD Projekt Red used a first-person perspective to immerse the player further in the world and home in on the megacorporation motif. To seamlessly blend cutscenes with gameplay, CD Projekt Red decided to frame cutscenes in first-person, including the sex scenes, with limited exceptions. Players can, however, drive in third-person, and the player's character is visible in areas such as mirrors and security cameras. The decision by game director Adam Badowski to include nudity was tactfully planned, with Badowski stating, "Nudity is important for us because of one reason. This is cyberpunk, so people augment their body. So the body is no longer [sacred]; it's [profane]", expanding upon transhumanist beliefs.

The quest team took several changes in comparison to the quest system in The Witcher 3: Wild Hunt (2015). Game logic was implemented to allow for players to undertake quests in seemingly random orders while remaining coherent, while doubling down on The Witcher 3's philosophy of a "quest twist". Some side quests were developed from unused elements of the main story, with story content repurposed as side quests when the main story changed.

=== Technology ===
Cyberpunk 2077 was developed using REDengine 4, the fourth iteration of CD Projekt Red's internal game engine. REDengine 3, REDengine 4's predecessor, implemented improvements to terrain and vegetation rendering. To achieve this, regions are streamed from a clipped mipmap (through a method known as clipmapping) in memory. Six clipmaps are created in total: the elevation, control map, and colour clipmaps are streamed, while the vertical error, normal, and terrain shadow clipmaps are generated at runtime. In addition, a technique known as tessellation is used, where polygons are divided. In particular, polygon triangulation is used, where data is tessellated into triangles. The error maps are downsampled prior to hardware tessellation. This avoids costly computation, as large areas with high levels of tessellation aren't rendered. Furthermore, REDengine3 employs a radical approach to texturing; textures are painted using two textures: a background texture and an overlay texture. For slopes, the slope angle is computed and compared against a threshold value. Creating a thick cover on slopes was made possible through boosting the overlay texture when the vertex normal looked up; however, this presented complications in ground features, such as cobblestones, where improper distribution was applied. To address this, damping was added, along with blend sharpening. These measures created an ultimately low memory footprint. Other advancements made by REDengine 3 include refined animations, volumetric effects allowing for advanced rendering of particle effects, such as clouds, dynamic physics, and an advanced dialogue mimic system. These improvements allowed The Witcher 3: Wild Hunt to have a more immersive open-world.

Although Cyberpunk 2077 was initially developed using REDengine 3 as far back as 2013, CD Projekt Red developed REDengine 4 after facing difficulty developing the game, which used a first-person perspective, a departure from the third-person perspective CD Projekt had developed in for earlier iterations of REDengine. REDengine 4 was developed using a US$7 million grant from the Polish government. Nearly every aspect of REDengine was changed as a result, including the particle effects editor. In a report from CD Projekt Red, it was revealed that the company continued to work on REDengine throughout Cyberpunk 2077's development cycle, as late as 2017. Cyberpunk 2077 is the final game to use REDengine, as future games from CD Projekt Red will instead be developed using Unreal Engine 5.

REDengine 4 implemented various lighting adjustments to create a more realistic world, including hardware-accelerated real-time ray tracing through DirectX, global illumination, diffuse illumination, and ambient occlusion. These features are not present on the console versions of the game. Other features include physically based rendering—an improvement over REDengine 3, screen space reflections, and pin sharp reflections, although the player's character is omitted from the bounding volume hierarchy structure generated ray-traced reflections. The player's character does appear, however, in render to texture objects, such as mirrors. Improvements to shadows include cascaded shadow maps, screen space shadows, and ray-traced shadows with contact hardening, while improvements to character rendering include subsurface scattering and realistic skin shading. These features introduced computational complexity, testing older consoles, such as the PlayStation 4 and Xbox One. Cyberpunk 2077 uses vertical asset streaming, or culling, a rendering technique that omits objects below and above the player's field of view. This technique saves memory.

During the development of Cyberpunk 2077, CD Projekt Red partnered with several companies. These companies include Vancouver-based studio Digital Scapes to create additional tools, multinational technology company Nvidia to implement real-time ray tracing, and developer QLOC for quality assurance. In addition, artificial intelligence company Jali Research helped CD Projekt Red implement lip syncing for all ten localisations through procedural generation.

=== Art ===
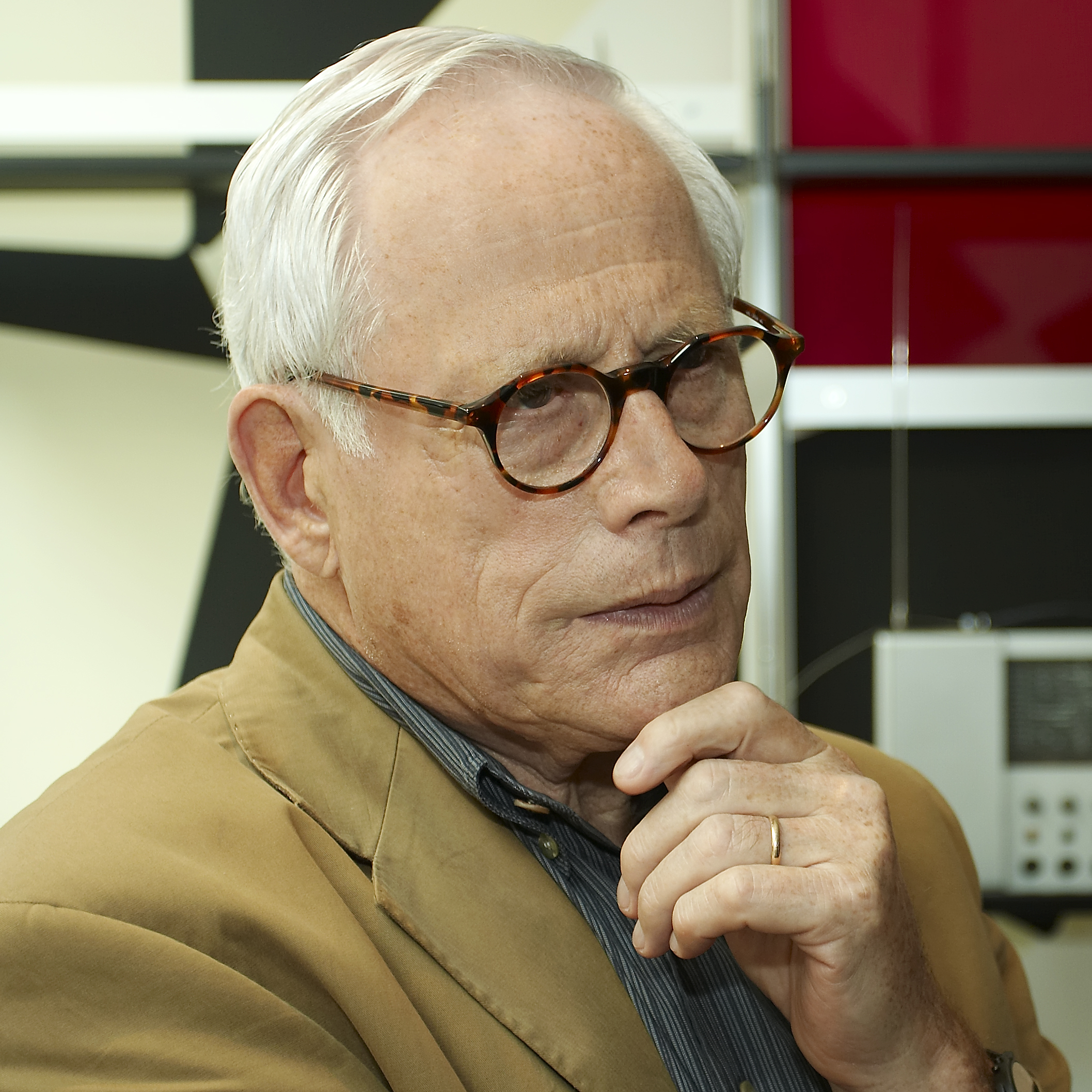
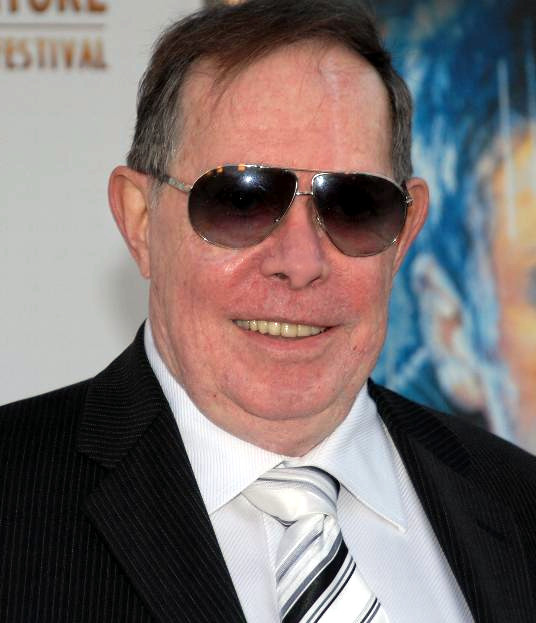
The work of Dieter Rams (left) and Syd Mead (right) served as inspiration for Night City.

When designing Night City, the art design team at CD Projekt Red took multiple sources of inspiration. German industrial designer Dieter Rams and American neo-futurist concept artist Syd Mead inspired the team, which used Rams' elegance to juxtapose the low-class neighbourhoods in Night City and Mead's vibrant colours and materialism to create the demeanor of Night City, in what the team called "kitsch". Building these environments took the team eight years. To create a cyberpunk look for Night City, the team incorporated retro and futuristic elements. To accomplish this, the team looked at dilapidated or old-fashioned buildings—aspects of a familiar reality—with futurism. "For example, you could have a run down building with an old wooden door, but an LED light might be attached to that door, which could be a part of a high-tech security system," Hiroshi Sakakibara, Environment City Coordinator at CD Projekt Red, said during a Cyberpunk 2077 livestream at Tokyo Game Show 2020. A key source of inspiration for the team was Blade Runner (1982), which Sakakibara referred to as the "Bible of all cyberpunk". Other sources of inspiration for the team include the manga and anime series Ghost in the Shell, and other video games such as System Shock (1994) and the first part of Deus Ex (2000). To design the buildings in Night City, the team consulted with urban planners and drew upon the themes of Brutalist architecture. The game's yellow-themed design is an attempt to distinguish Cyberpunk from existing icons in its genre. The designs of Marcello Gandini helped shape the appearance of many of the cars in the game. A motorbike akin to the one in the Akira manga and anime film appears in the game, as well as a car inspired by Mad Max: Fury Road (2015).

To develop the world building in Night City, the team used four distinct visual styles—austere Entropism, colourful Kitsch, imposing Neomilitarism, and opulent Neokitsch—to explain what happened to the world prior to the events of the game. Bulky cars and unappealing buildings represent Entropism, an architectural style that came about through necessity. In Entropism, practicality is valued more than aesthetics. As the economy recovered, the vibrant style of Kitsch gained traction. The style of Kitsch was countered with Neomilitarism, an ascetic movement where the rise of corporations undid many of the stylistic decisions made in Entropism. Finally, Neokitsch incorporated the classist systems in Neomilitarism with the vibrance of Kitsch. In Neokitsch, the rich use scarce materials, such as wood and marble, to construct their buildings, and wear clothes from animals. Night City features six districts, each with a unique gusto. Pacifica, for instance, was a prosperous vacation destination until an economic crisis hit, leaving the Haitian community to form a civilisation around the buildings.

Jakub Knapik, CD Projekt Red's Lighting and FX Art Director, used Nuke to create reference images for evaluating the lighting in REDengine and developing Night City's global illumination system. In contrast to most other video games, which use tone-mapping, Cyberpunk 2077 uses a classic film LUT. In addition, Nuke was used to design the game's user interface and splash screen.

=== Voice work ===
Gavin Drea and Cherami Leigh provide the voice of the male and female versions of V, respectively. CD Projekt Red sought a suitable voice actor for the role of Johnny Silverhand, and approached Keanu Reeves in July 2018 for the role. Reeves' performance was recorded using motion capture technology, a process he had previously used for his performance as Neo in The Matrix (1999). Although a newcomer to the video game format, Reeves enjoyed the script. Silverhand is featured prominently in the game, with CD Projekt co-founder Marcin Iwiński recalling in an interview that Silverhand's dialogue count is second only to V. The localisation of Cyberpunk 2077 involved nearly half of the 5,381 people working on the game, including 1,966 voice actors.

== Music ==
Multiple licensed musical artists contributed to Cyberpunk 2077's fictional radio stations and soundtrack albums, including Run the Jewels, Rosa Walton, Grimes, Refused, ASAP Rocky, Gazelle Twin, Yugen Blakrok, and Ilan Rubin. Run the Jewels wrote "No Save Point" for the game's soundtrack—a track that vividly critiques the socioeconomic state of Night City. The song is featured in the game and performed by El-P and Killer Mike as "Yankee and the Brave", a reference to a song on the duo's fourth studio album, RTJ4. Walton's "I Really Want to Stay at Your House" would later go viral in 2022 after being prominently utilised in the anime series Cyberpunk: Edgerunners, and topped Billboard's Top TV Songs in the United States.

== Marketing ==
Funko Pops were obtainable starting 16 April 2020. CD Projekt Red held a cosplay competition in June 2019. McFarlane Toys signed a three-year agreement to manufacture action figures. The Cyberpunk 2077-themed Xbox One X, which includes a digital copy and downloadable content, became the final limited edition of that console. Designed with the same aesthetic were video cards, gaming chairs, energy drinks, sneakers, smartphones exclusive to China, and peripherals. From May 2020, advertising company Agora Group had newspapers, online services, and radio channels doing promotion in Poland. Their subsidiaries carried out publicity outdoors and in cinemas, using established brands to disseminate information about the game.

== Release ==
Cyberpunk 2077 was announced in May 2012. Trailers for the game were released in January 2013, at E3 2018, and at E3 2019. The game was initially confirmed for Windows, with versions for PlayStation 4 and Xbox One announced at E3 2018, and for Stadia in August 2019. At E3 2019, an initial release date of 16 April 2020 was announced. This was delayed to 17 September, then 19 November, and finally 10 December. The developers received death threats over the last delay. The final delay was decided suddenly, with discussions commencing a day before the initial announcement. Due to Polish law, CD Projekt was not allowed to inform every member of the development team due to its large size; around ninety per cent were not informed until the last minute. Rockfish Game's Everspace 2's early access release and an expansion to Grinding Gear Games's Path of Exile, scheduled to be released in December 2020, were delayed until the following month in order to avoid competing with Cyberpunk 2077's release.

With E3 2020 cancelled because of the COVID-19 pandemic, CD Projekt's online event Night City Wire showed additional trailers, more gameplay, and making-of footage. Next-generation ports for Xbox Series X/S and PlayStation 5 were initially scheduled for release in 2021, but were delayed in October 2021, before eventually releasing on 15 February 2022. Owners of the Xbox One and PlayStation 4 versions were able to freely download the game on their respective next-generation models. The delayed standalone multiplayer was announced to launch after 2021. The base game, along with the Phantom Liberty expansion, was released for macOS on 17 July 2025.

As with The Witcher 2 and The Witcher 3, both Warner Bros. Interactive Entertainment, and Bandai Namco Entertainment served as physical distributors in North America and Central Europe, Australia, and New Zealand respectively. Spike Chunsoft published the physical PlayStation 4 copies in Japan. The versions of Cyberpunk 2077 released in Japan were subject to a reduction in the amount of nudity and gore portrayed in order to meet rating agency requirements and censorship laws. The day after its release, the game was condemned by some Chinese netizens because the Cyberpunk Wiki, a user-generated online encyclopaedia about the game, described Taiwan as "not really a country and not actually part of China". A datamine of the game's source code by hackers in February 2021 revealed that content flagged for censorship in China was tagged under "Winnie the Pooh", a reference to an internet meme in which Chinese Communist Party leader Xi Jinping was compared to the character. In February 2022, CD Projekt publicly supported Ukraine following the Russian invasion of the country by suspending all sales of Cyberpunk 2077 in Russia and Belarus, and donating a million Polish złoty to a humanitarian charity operating in Ukraine.

=== Retail editions ===
A "Collector's Edition" consisting of a custom box, steelbook case, figurine depicting a male V, hardcover artbook, metal pin set and keychain, A Visitor's Guide to Night City, embroidered patches, world compendium, Night City postcards and map, and stickers was released along with the game. The standard edition also contains the compendium, postcards, map, and stickers. Digital items that come with every copy are the soundtrack, art booklet, Cyberpunk 2020 sourcebook, wallpapers, and Cyberpunk 2077: Your Voice comic. Purchases through CD Projekt's subsidiary GOG.com include the digital comic Cyberpunk 2077: Big City Dreams.

A physical release of the game for PlayStation 5 and Xbox Series X, which includes Phantom Liberty, was announced on 21 November 2023. Players on PC could purchase this version digitally, and PlayStation 5 releases come with a digital code instead of a disc. This release, titled the "Ultimate Edition", was released on 5 December 2023. The Ultimate Edition was released for the Nintendo Switch 2 as a launch title on 5 June 2025. This version received notable media attention for being one of the few third-party games on the system at launch to not be released on a Game-Key Card, instead featuring the complete game on a 64GB cartridge.

=== DLC and updates ===
In September 2022, CD Projekt Red released Patch 1.6, also known as the "Edgerunners Update", which added free DLC and in-game content inspired by the Cyberpunk: Edgerunners anime. The Phantom Liberty expansion, which stars Idris Elba as the voice and motion capture for the character Solomon Reed, was released in September 2023.

Update 2.0, released just days before the Phantom Liberty expansion, brought a series of major changes that overhauled the core elements of the RPG, and was met with positive reviews. Nearly three years after the game's release, many minor bugs have been fixed. "Update 2.0 has given Cyberpunk 2077 a pulse that didn't exist before," Polygon reported. The patch also added a Ukrainian language option, but the translation contained anti-Russian statements specifically referring to Russia's invasion of Ukraine in 2022. CD Projekt apologised, stating that it was unaware these comments had been included. The translations were provided by an external agency hired for localisation, and the company said they would be replaced in the next update. Following the 2.0 update, Cyberpunk 2077 became the first game to feature AI-powered ray tracing with Nvidia's DLSS 3.5.

Along with the release of the "Ultimate Edition" on 5 December 2023, CD Projekt released Update 2.1, which was described as "the last major update", which introduces a functioning Metro system, additional scenes with V's romantic interest, and other quality improvements. As of February 2024, only 17 developers remained working on Cyberpunk 2077. Three months later, none were left. However, at the end of 2024, CD Projekt unexpectedly released update 2.2, which included a feature where Johnny Silverhand would sit in the passenger seat while V was driving, occasionally commenting or reacting to the surrounding events. Patch 2.21 adds support for Nvidia DLSS 4, along with other changes, making Cyberpunk 2077 the first game to utilise DLSS 4's new multi-frame generation technology.

As with Update 1.6 tying into the concurrently-released Edgerunners anime, the release of Edgerunners 2 was supplemented with Update 2.5, which was released on 22 October 2026. It added a side-quest that serves as a prequel to the series, a perk that allows V to dual-wield pistol-type weapons and mod support on consoles amongst other quality-of-life improvements.

== Reception ==
=== Pre-release ===
The game was highly anticipated before its release. (Note: Attributed to multiple references.) It won over one hundred awards at E3 2018, (Note: Attributed to multiple references.) including Best Game, Best Xbox One Game, Best PC Game, Best RPG, and People's Choice at IGN, Best Role-Playing Game and Game of the Show at Game Informer, Best of E3 at PC Gamer, and Game of the Show at GamesRadar+. The second trailer was considered one of the best at the expo, although writer William Gibson, credited with pioneering the cyberpunk subgenre, described it as "GTA skinned-over with a generic 80s retro-future". Gibson later responded more positively to the first gameplay demo. The first-person perspective, in contrast with The Witcher 3: Wild Hunt's third-person, was subject to criticism. Cyberpunk 2077 was the most widely discussed game of E3 2019, where it was presented awards for Best of E3 at GamesRadar+, PC Gamer, Rock Paper Shotgun, Ars Technica, and Best Game, People's Choice, Best PS4 Game, Best Xbox One Game, Best PC Game, and Best RPG at IGN. The third trailer was lauded with emphasis on Reeves' reveal.

Liana Ruppert, a journalist for Game Informer who has photosensitive epilepsy, experienced a grand mal seizure while reviewing the game days before its release. The seizure was triggered by the game's "braindance" sequence, which contains red and white flashing lights that reportedly resemble the patterns produced by medical devices used to intentionally trigger seizures. At this point, Cyberpunk 2077 included only a generic warning about "flashing lights and images" in its EULA, with no specific warnings about the sequence or instructions on how to skip it. In response, CD Projekt Red made a public statement and reached out to Ruppert. The company then released a patch to add a warning, and issued a later patch on 11 December to reduce the risk of inducing epileptic symptoms. In an email to The Washington Post, Stephanie Bayer, the North American communications director for CD Projekt Red, stated that the developers had incorporated Ruppert's suggestions and "adjusted the entire sequence" so it would no longer be a seizure trigger.

Prior to the release of the game, CD Projekt Red provided review copies of Cyberpunk to several major outlets. CD Projekt Red issued strict review embargo terms on these review copies, requiring reviewers to sign non-disclosure agreements (NDA) and only allowing for footage provided by the company to be shown in reviews; according to Wired (which did not receive a reviewer copy), violating the NDA could cost around $27,000 per violation. Concern also arose over the fact review copies were issued for the PC version of the game, ensuring that all pre-release reviews related to the PC version of the game, excluding consoles.

=== Post-release ===
Reception

Aggregate scores
Aggregator	Score
Metacritic	NS2 (Ultimate Edition): 85/100; PC: 86/100; PS4: 57/100; PS5: 75/100; XONE: 61/100; XSXS: 87/100
OpenCritic	66% recommend

Review scores
Publication	Score
Game Informer	PC: 9/10
GameSpot	PC: 7/10
GamesRadar+	PC: 5/5
IGN	PC: 9/10
NME	PC: 4/5
PC Gamer (US)	PC: 78/100
PCGamesN	PC: 9/10
PCMag	PC: 3.5/5
The Guardian	PC: 3/5
Video Games Chronicle	PC: 5/5
VG247	PC: 5/5

The PC, PlayStation 5 and Xbox Series releases of Cyberpunk 2077 received "generally favorable" reviews from critics, according to review aggregator website Metacritic. The PlayStation 4 and Xbox One versions of the game received "mixed or average" reviews. The Switch 2 version of the Ultimate Edition received "generally favorable" reviews. Additionally, 66% of critics recommended the game, according to OpenCritic.

Critics praised the quality of the story as well as the depth and expansiveness of side quests, immersive atmosphere of the world, visual quality, and freshness of the cyberpunk setting. The game's systems such as crafting, driving mechanics, and combat received a mixed response. Some critics, while acknowledging the game's many strengths, nonetheless criticised its shallow portrayal of the cyberpunk genre, and also described its portrayal of related themes such as anti-capitalism and anarchism as ironic. Others took issue with what was seen as misogynistic, xenophobic, and transphobic portrayals, arguing that transgender characters were fetishised by in-game material but were not given any meaningful role in the narrative.

Within hours of its midnight GMT launch on 10 December, the game set a record with over one million concurrent single players on Steam, and one million live viewers on Twitch, doubling the previous record set by Fallout 4 in 2015. On Steam, user reviews for Cyberpunk 2077 became increasingly positive over time. The game was rated "mostly positive" shortly after its late 2020 release, reached "very positive" after two and a half years, and by January 2025 – more than four years after launch – it attained the "overwhelmingly positive" rating. Following the release of the anime series Cyberpunk: Edgerunners on Netflix in September 2022, along with several post-release patches, the game's player count on PC surged to levels not seen since its initial release. The million-plus daily player count continued for at least four weeks following the release of Edgerunners.

=== Technical issues ===
The release of Cyberpunk 2077 was a high-profile event and was considered a disastrous launch, (Note: Attributed to multiple references.) as a result of the game suffering from numerous bugs and performance issues, particularly on the PlayStation 4 and Xbox One versions. (Note: Attributed to multiple references.) The Guardian called the release "a shambles", while The New York Times said it was among the most conspicuous disasters in the industry's history, with CD Projekt Red prominently failing to meet expectations for what was anticipated to be the biggest game release of the year. Other gaming industry commentators have described the post-launch reception of Cyberpunk 2077 as a fall from grace for CD Projekt Red, who had previously enjoyed a fiercely pro-consumer reputation.

Some of the initial reviews that had been based only on the PC version of the game were later updated to add a caveat about the notable difference in performance between this version and its console releases. Because of the game's performance on consoles, CD Projekt issued an apology, particularly for their pre-release secrecy regarding these versions, concluding that unsatisfied consumers could opt for refunds. This was initially followed by multiple reports of players unable to get said refund. CD Projekt Red later stated that they had no specific deals in place with either Microsoft or Sony to facilitate such an action; refunds are dealt with according to standard refund policies. On December 2020, Sony announced that it would offer refunds to customers who had purchased Cyberpunk 2077 through the PlayStation Store and removed it from the store "until further notice"; once returned to the store in June 2021, the PlayStation Store warned users that "Users continue to experience performance issues with this game. Purchase for use on PS4 systems is not recommended". The Xbox One version of the game remained available for purchase from the online Microsoft Store, albeit with a warning about the game's performance issues. Players who bought the game through the Microsoft Store were also offered refunds. In the US, GameStop accepted returns of boxed versions of the game even if the box was opened, an exception to the store's usual refund policy. During a conference call with investors, top executives at CD Projekt Red acknowledged having taken the "wrong approach" to developing the Xbox One and PS4 versions.

Although the game's reviews were largely positive, its aggregate score was thought to be disappointing by analysts. CD Projekt SA stock fell by up to 9.4% after the publication of Metacritic's reviews. The review aggregator OpenCritic criticised CD Projekt Red for deliberately attempting to misrepresent the game, and not delivering review copies for Xbox One and PlayStation 4, knowing it would receive negative reviews. A class-action lawsuit representing those making investments in CD Projekt during 2020 was filed on 24 December 2020 in California, asserting that the company made fraudulent claims to the state of Cyberpunk 2077 as to mislead those investors; a second similar class-action suit had also been filed by January 2021. By May 2021, four separate lawsuits against CD Projekt had been filed over Cyberpunk 2077, and had been subsequently merged into one common action. CD Projekt proposed a settlement with the investors in December 2021, providing US$1.85 million to the group as part of the terms, which was approved by a judge in January 2023. Poland's Office of Competition and Consumer Protection began an investigation of the game in January 2021, asking CD Projekt for an "explanation regarding problems with the game and actions taken by them". Having previously asked its employees to work 6-day weeks for several final months of the development of the game, the company ditched plans to tie developers' bonuses to review scores, choosing instead to pay out the full bonus regardless.

Jason Schreier of Bloomberg News said that, based on discussions with CD Projekt developers, a major reason for the poor performance of Cyberpunk 2077 on release was underestimating the effort that would be needed. While more than twice as many developers were brought on board to help with the game compared to The Witcher 3, CD Projekt had only expected the same amount of time to complete the game, so that the bulk of development towards the game only began in late 2016. The expanded scope of Cyberpunk 2077 including the game's new engine had created difficulties, and while there were more developers, there was less organisation of their various functions that further hampered the development, according to Schreier's report. Many developers urged management to hold off on the game's release. Co-CEO Marcin Iwiński issued an open message to players on 13 January 2021, apologising for the state of the game and the company's plans to correct it. Iwiński stated that the company "underestimated the risk" in bringing a game optimised to run on personal computers over to consoles, particularly the older Xbox One and PlayStation 4 consoles. He specifically faulted the in-game streaming engine that was used to load in assets from storage on the fly as the player moved through the game, which was scaled back to work on the older consoles. While they had tested these versions as they approached release, they had not seen the same issues that players had reported in the released version. He affirmed that the developers were not responsible for the release state of the game, but instead this was a choice made by himself and the other management of the company. Besides working to issue refunds and bring the game to a state to return it to the PlayStation Store, Iwiński outlined a year-long path that will involve multiple patches to bring the older consoles' versions to better performance and then looking to optimising the game for newer consoles, prior to any further additional content development.

=== Edgerunners release ===
Despite the rampant technical issues that were prevalent during its initial release that affected the game's sales, Cyberpunk 2077 saw an increase in the number of units sold in 2022 of up to 18%, with 94% of the sales being digital. This increase was partially attributed to the release of the Netflix anime series Cyberpunk: Edgerunners, which garnered positive reviews from both critics and audience, and the concurrent release of a game update which added tie-in material from the series. CD Projekt Red recognised the success of Edgerunners having driven sales of Cyberpunk 2077 by stating that "a significant increase in the amount of the Group's Sales in the third quarter of 2022 in relation to the reference period was mainly due to a good reception of the Cyberpunk Edgerunner update 1.6 which preceded the release on Netflix of the Cyberpunk: Edgerunners anime series". The series would again be referenced in the 2.0 update that came alongside the Phantom Liberty expansion.

=== Financials ===
Cyberpunk 2077 received eight million pre-orders on all platforms, of which 74% were digital, and it received more pre-orders than The Witcher 3: Wild Hunt; one third of PC sales were through GOG.com. In June 2019, the game's pre-orders quickly climbed to the top of Steam's best-seller list in China. A year later, the game had more pre-orders in China than any other country, despite it not being approved for sale in China at the time. CD Projekt Red has stated that digital preorders for the title alone recouped the game's production cost as well as the game's 2020 marketing cost. According to a CD Projekt investors call, sales saw a drastic decline four days after release owing to the technical issues present. After the launch, analyst estimations for sales over 12 months fell from 30 million to 25.6 million.

In Japan, the PlayStation 4 version of Cyberpunk 2077 sold an estimated 104,687 physical units during its debut week, making it the second best-selling retail game of the week in the country. The game passed 13 million units sold in December 2020. It had the biggest digital game launch of all time, selling 10.2 million digital units, and grossed $609 million in digital sales by 31 December 2020. By September 2022, the game had sold over 20 million units. As of October 2023, it has sold over 25 million units. CD Projekt announced the game had sold 30 million copies by November 2024, over 35 million a year later, and 40 million by July 2026, making it one of the best-selling games of all time.

In October 2023, CD Projekt Red revealed that it had spent $125 million on Cyberpunk 2077 since launch, accounting for updates and bug fixes. The base game cost $174 million to develop, while the development and marketing of Phantom Liberty cost roughly $85 million. The game's total production cost is said to have been between $436 million, and around $440–441 million, making it one of the most expensive video games to develop.

=== Accolades ===
In 2013, Cyberpunk 2077's teaser received a Golden Trailer Awards nomination in the Best Video Game Trailer category and earned a second nomination in the same category in 2021. In the years leading up to its release, Cyberpunk 2077 was among the most highly anticipated games, evidenced by winning two consecutive Golden Joystick Awards for Most Wanted Game in 2018 and 2019. At the 2018 Electronic Entertainment Expo, the game garnered over 100 awards, including accolades for Best Game, Best Xbox One Game, Best PC Game, Best RPG, and the People's Choice award. A month after E3, Cyberpunk 2077 received two Game Critics Awards: Special Commendation for Graphics and Innovation. In early 2020, the character Dexter DeShawn won the Visual Effects Society Awards for Outstanding Animated Character in a Commercial. Mid-year, the game earned two Webby Awards for Best Use of Animation or Motion Graphics and People's Voice. Continuing its streak, in August 2020 at Gamescom, the game won all five of its nominations, including Best PC Game and Best of Gamescom.

In 2021, following its launch, Cyberpunk 2077 received four nominations at the British Academy Games Awards, including two for voice acting: Cherami Leigh as the female V and Carla Tassara as Judy Alvarez. The game earned two nominations at The Game Awards, for Best Score and Music and Best Role Playing Game. It received three nominations at the New York Game Awards and a nomination at four consecutive awards: the SXSW Gaming Awards, D.I.C.E. Awards, Game Developers Choice Awards, and Guild of Music Supervisors Awards. It also earned two nominations at the Visual Effects Society Awards and won the Best Game Trailer Audio category at the Game Audio Network Guild Awards, where it received a total of four nominations.

After an extended period of updates, bug fixes, and the release of the Phantom Liberty expansion, CD Projekt successfully revitalised the Cyberpunk 2077 franchise, earning the game its first The Game Awards win in the Best Ongoing Game category, three years after its release. In 2024, Cyberpunk 2077 continued its success by receiving its first British Academy Games Awards in the Evolving Game category. Additionally, the game also won two Steam Awards in the Outstanding Story-Rich Game and Labor of Love categories in 2022 and 2023.

Award nominations for Cyberpunk 2077
Award	Date	Category	Recipient(s)	Result	Ref.
App Store Awards	4 December 2025	Mac Game of the Year	Cyberpunk 2077	Won	
ASCAP Screen Music Awards	17 May 2021	Video Game Score of the Year	P.T. Adamczyk, Paul Leonard-Morgan & Marcin Przybyłowicz	Nominated	
British Academy Games Awards	25 March 2021	Artistic Achievement	Cyberpunk 2077	Nominated	
British Academy Games Awards	25 March 2021	Narrative	Cyberpunk 2077	Nominated	
British Academy Games Awards	25 March 2021	Performer in a Leading Role	Cherami Leigh	Nominated	
British Academy Games Awards	25 March 2021	Performer in a Supporting Role	Carla Tassara	Nominated	
British Academy Games Awards	11 April 2024	Evolving Game	Cyberpunk 2077	Won	
British Academy Games Awards	11 April 2024	EE Player's Choice Award	Cyberpunk 2077	Nominated	
D.I.C.E. Awards	22 April 2021	Role-Playing Game of the Year	Cyberpunk 2077	Nominated	
Digital Dragon Awards	15 May 2023	Best Ongoing Polish Game	Cyberpunk 2077	Won	
E3 2018 Awards	12–14 June 2018	Best Game	Cyberpunk 2077	Won	
E3 2018 Awards	12–14 June 2018	Best PlayStation 4 Game	Cyberpunk 2077	Nominated	
E3 2018 Awards	12–14 June 2018	Best Xbox One Game	Cyberpunk 2077	Won	
E3 2018 Awards	12–14 June 2018	Best PC Game	Cyberpunk 2077	Won	
E3 2018 Awards	12–14 June 2018	Best RPG	Cyberpunk 2077	Won	
E3 2018 Awards	12–14 June 2018	Best Trailer	Cyberpunk 2077	Nominated	
E3 2018 Awards	12–14 June 2018	People's Choice	Cyberpunk 2077	Won	
Game Audio Network Guild Awards	28 April 2021	Audio of The Year	Cyberpunk 2077	Nominated	
Game Audio Network Guild Awards	28 April 2021	Dialogue of the Year	Cyberpunk 2077	Nominated	
Game Audio Network Guild Awards	28 April 2021	Best New Original IP Audio	Cyberpunk 2077	Nominated	
Game Audio Network Guild Awards	28 April 2021	Best Game Trailer Audio	Cyberpunk 2077	Won	
Game Critics Awards	2 July 2018	Special Commendation for Graphics	Cyberpunk 2077	Won	
Game Critics Awards	2 July 2018	Special Commendation for Innovation	Cyberpunk 2077	Won	
Game Critics Awards	27 June 2019	Special Commendation for Graphics	Cyberpunk 2077	Won	
Game Developers Choice Awards	21 July 2021	Best Visual Art	Cyberpunk 2077	Nominated	
Gamers' Choice Awards	9 December 2018	Most Anticipated Game	Cyberpunk 2077	Nominated	
Gamescom Awards	27 August 2020	Best PC Game	Cyberpunk 2077	Won	
Gamescom Awards	27 August 2020	Best Role-Playing Game	Cyberpunk 2077	Won	
Gamescom Awards	27 August 2020	Best of Gamescom	Cyberpunk 2077	Won	
Gamescom Awards	27 August 2020	Best Sony PlayStation Game	Cyberpunk 2077	Won	
Gamescom Awards	27 August 2020	Gamescom "Most Wanted" Consumer Award	Cyberpunk 2077	Won	
Golden Joystick Awards	16 November 2018	Most Wanted Game	Cyberpunk 2077	Won	
Golden Joystick Awards	16 November 2019	Most Wanted Game	Cyberpunk 2077	Won	
Golden Trailer Awards	3 May 2013	Best Video Game Trailer	Cyberpunk 2077	Nominated	
Golden Trailer Awards	22 July 2021	Best Video Game Trailer	Cyberpunk 2077	Nominated	
Golden Trailer Awards	22 July 2021	Best Video Game TV Spot	Cyberpunk 2077	Nominated	
Guild of Music Supervisors Awards	11 April 2021	Best Music Supervision in a Video Game	Eric Craig	Nominated	
New York Game Awards	26 January 2021	Statue of Liberty Award for Best World	Cyberpunk 2077	Nominated	
New York Game Awards	26 January 2021	Herman Melville Award for Best Writing	Cyberpunk 2077	Nominated	
New York Game Awards	26 January 2021	Great White Way Award for Best Acting in a Game	Keanu Reeves	Nominated	
SXSW Gaming Awards	20 March 2021	Excellence in Score	Cyberpunk 2077	Nominated	
The Game Awards	9 December 2021	Best Score and Music	Marcin Przybyłowicz and Piotr T. Adamczyk	Nominated	
The Game Awards	9 December 2021	Best Role Playing Game	Cyberpunk 2077	Nominated	
The Game Awards	7 December 2023	Best Ongoing Game	Cyberpunk 2077	Won	
The Game Awards	7 December 2023	Best Community Support	Cyberpunk 2077	Nominated	
The Steam Awards	3 January 2022	Game of the Year	Cyberpunk 2077	Nominated	
The Steam Awards	3 January 2022	Outstanding Story-Rich Game	Cyberpunk 2077	Won	
The Steam Awards	3 January 2023	Labor of Love	Cyberpunk 2077	Won	
Visual Effects Society Awards	29 January 2020	Outstanding Animated Character in a Commercial	Dex – Jonas Ekman, Jonas Skoog, Marek Madej, Grzegorz Chonjnacki	Won	
Visual Effects Society Awards	6 April 2021	Outstanding Created Environment in an Episode, Commercial, or Real-Time Project	Night City – Jakub Knapik, Lucjan Więcek	Nominated	
Visual Effects Society Awards	6 April 2021	Outstanding Visual Effects in a Real-Time Project	Jakub Knapik, Małgorzata Mitręga, Piotr Suchodolski, Krzysztof Krzyścin	Nominated	
Webby Awards	19 May 2020	Advertising, Media & PR - Best Use of Animation or Motion Graphics	Cyberpunk 2077	Won	
Webby Awards	19 May 2020	People's Voice	Cyberpunk 2077	Won	

== Related media ==
=== Comics ===
The World of Cyberpunk 2077, a 192-page art book, was published by Dark Horse Books in July 2020. By September of the same year, Dark Horse Comics brought out the first issue of a comic book series called Cyberpunk 2077: Trauma Team with writer Cullen Bunn and illustrator Miguel Valderrama. Several other comics set in the world of Cyberpunk 2077 have also been released by the same publisher, including Cyberpunk 2077: Big City Dreams, which won the Hugo Award for Best Graphic Story or Comic in 2023, and Cyberpunk 2077: Blackout (2022).

Title	Date	Notes	Collected editions
Cyberpunk 2077: Trauma Team #1-4	9 September – 16 December 2020	Story: Cullen Bunn; Art: Miguel Valderrama	ISBN 1-50671-601-6
Cyberpunk 2077: You Have My Word #1-4	28 April 2021 – 16 November 2022	Story: Bartosz Sztybor; Art: Jesús Hervás	ISBN 1-50672-566-X
Cyberpunk 2077: Blackout #1-4	1 June – 7 September 2022	Story: Bartosz Sztybor; Art: Roberto Ricci	ISBN 1-50672-627-5
Cyberpunk 2077: Your Voice	23 June 2021	Story: Aleksandra Motyka, Marcin Blacha; Art: Danijel Zezelj	ISBN 1-50672-623-2
Cyberpunk 2077: Where's Johnny?	20 October 2021	Story: Bartosz Sztybor; Art: Giannis Milonogiannis	ISBN 1-50672-625-9
Cyberpunk 2077: Big City Dreams	12 January 2022	Story: Bartosz Sztybor; Art: Filipe Andrade, Alessio Fioriniello	ISBN 1-50672-686-0
Cyberpunk 2077: XOXO #1-4	18 October 2023 – 24 January 2024	Story: Bartosz Sztybor; Art: Jakub Rebelka	ISBN 1-50672-683-6
Cyberpunk 2077: Kickdown #1-4	3 July – 20 November 2024	Story: Thomasz Marchewk; Art: Jake Elphick, Tommaso Bennato	ISBN 1-50672-684-4

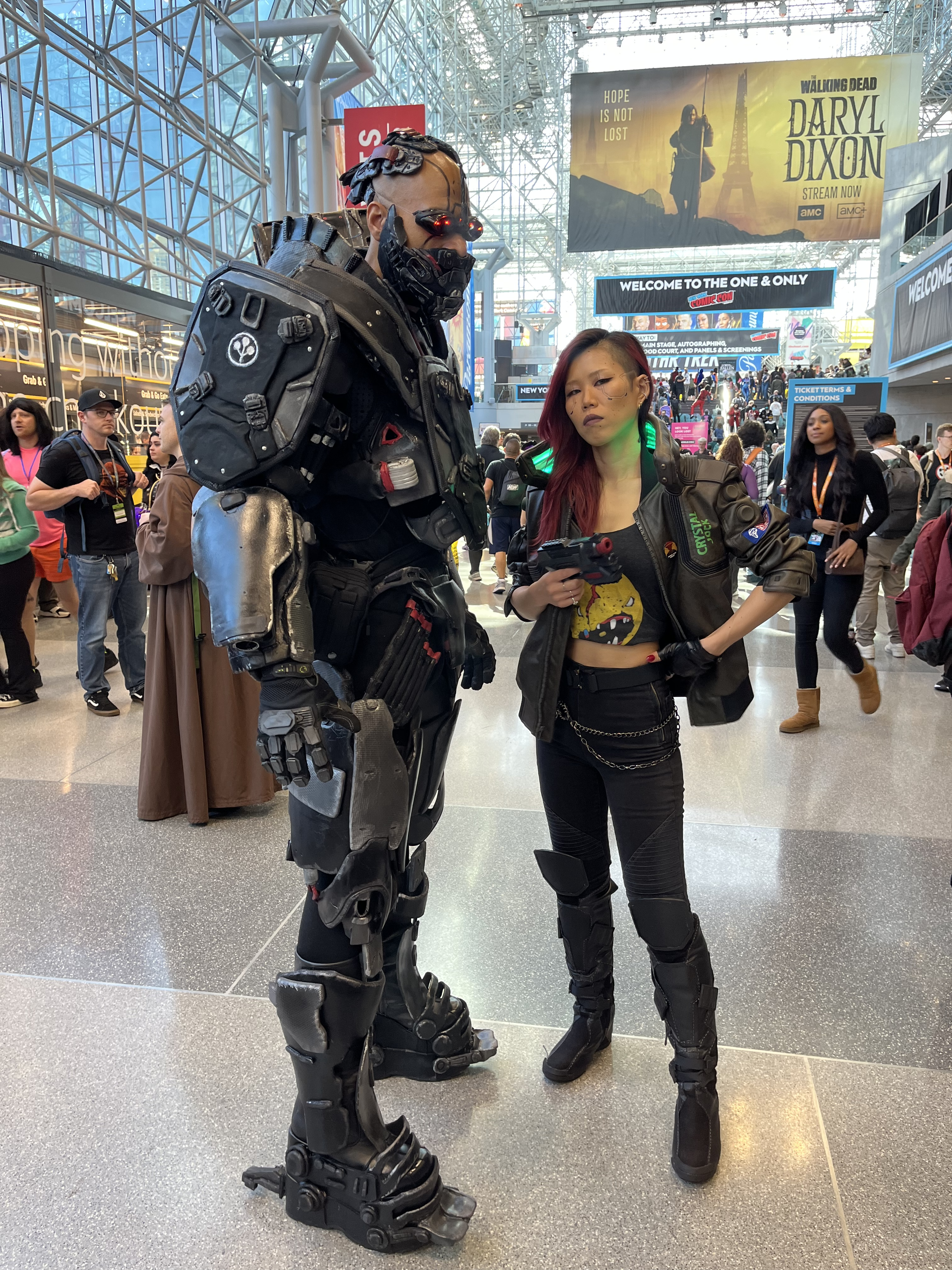
Cosplay of Adam Smasher and Female V at the New York Comic Con 2023

=== Novel ===
Cyberpunk 2077: No Coincidence, a novel by Polish author Rafał Kosik, was published in August 2023. It was translated to English by Stefan Kiełbasiewicz and published by Orbit.

=== Film and television ===
Cyberpunk: Edgerunners, a spin-off anime series co-produced by CD Projekt Red and Trigger, premiered on 13 September 2022 on Netflix, and a standalone sequel series, Cyberpunk: Edgerunners 2, premiered on 20 October 2026.

In October 2026, a live-action film based on the game was reported to be in development at Paramount Pictures, with Lorenzo di Bonaventura producing. According to Michał Nowakowski, co-CEO of CD Projekt Red, the film will tell a new story set in the game's world instead of directly adapting its story, similar to the Edgerunners anime series.

=== Other ===
A card game created alongside publisher CMON Limited, Cyberpunk 2077 – Afterlife: The Card Game, was slated for 2020 but has yet to be released; no updating announcements have been made and the card game's future remains uncertain. In early 2025, an hour-long fan film titled Black Dog was released, a project that later received congratulations from Paweł Sasko, the original game director.

== Sequel ==
A sequel to Cyberpunk 2077 was announced in October 2022. Internally codenamed "Project Orion", it is being developed using Unreal Engine 5 by CD Projekt's North American studios. The game entered pre-production in May 2025. CD Projekt did not dismiss the possibility that the sequel might not be released until late 2030 or early 2031, stating "our journey from pre-production to final release takes four to five years on average".

== See also ==
- List of video games notable for negative reception
- Anarcho-capitalism
