= Larry Ahern =

Larry Ahern may refer to:

- Larry Ahern (game designer)
- Larry Ahern (politician)
