= The Curse of Monkey Island =

1997 video game

- Developer: LucasArts
- Publisher: LucasArts
- Directors: Larry Ahern; Jonathan Ackley
- Designers: Larry Ahern; Jonathan Ackley
- Programmers: Jonathan Ackley; Aric Wilmunder
- Artists: Larry Ahern; Bill Tiller
- Writers: Jonathan Ackley; Chuck Jordan; Chris Purvis; Larry Ahern
- Composer: Michael Land
- Series: Monkey Island
- Engine: SCUMM iMUSE
- Platforms: Windows; OS X
- Release: Windows: NA: November 11, 1997; UK: November 14, 1997; OS X: WW: March 22, 2018
- Genre: Graphic adventure
- Mode: Single-player

The Curse of Monkey Island is a 1997 adventure game developed and published by LucasArts for Microsoft Windows. A sequel to Monkey Island 2: LeChuck's Revenge (1991), it is the third game in the Monkey Island series. The story follows protagonist Guybrush Threepwood as he seeks to lift a curse from his love Elaine Marley, while once again being menaced by undead pirate LeChuck.

Production was led by a different creative team than the prior games, and took new directions in graphics and gameplay. The art has a cartoon-like cel animation style, and the previous games' verb command and inventory menus are replaced by a pop-up action menu and inventory chest. The Curse of Monkey Island was the twelfth and final LucasArts game to use the SCUMM engine, which was extensively upgraded for the game. It was the first game in the series to be released on CD-ROM, allowing for a full musical score, fully animated cutscenes, and the introduction of voice acting for the characters. Dominic Armato, Alexandra Boyd, Earl Boen, Leilani Jones, Neil Ross and Denny Delk respectively voiced Guybrush, Elaine, LeChuck, The Voodoo Lady, Wally. B Feed and Murray, and would reprise these roles in later installments.

The game sold well, particularly in Germany; lead background artist Bill Tiller estimated that it sold half a million units worldwide over the next several years. It was nominated for several gaming awards, and was named the best adventure game of the year by several gaming publications. It was followed in 2000 by Escape from Monkey Island, which again took the series' graphics and gameplay in new directions. The game was rereleased in 2018, alongside a version for macOS.

== Gameplay ==
A scene from The Curse of Monkey Island shows Guybrush Threepwood and Wally below decks in LeChuck's ship, with the coin-shaped pop-up menu indicating possible actions.

The Curse of Monkey Island is a point-and-click adventure game. The SCUMM engine used to create the interface in the previous Monkey Island games was also used for this installment, but the verb command and inventory menus which previously took up the lower portion of the screen are replaced by a pop-up action menu and inventory chest, allowing the game's scenes to occupy the entire screen. This was modeled on a similar system used for 1995's Full Throttle.

The player controls Guybrush's actions using a computer mouse and optional keyboard shortcuts. An on-screen cursor changes color to indicate objects or people with which Guybrush may interact. The player can then bring up the action menu, which resembles a gold coin and has three icons: a hand, a skull, and a parrot, respectively corresponding to actions related to the hands, eyes and mouth. The hand typically corresponds to physical actions such as picking something up, using an item, or operating a mechanism; the skull is usually used to look at something; and the parrot to talk to someone or eat something. Alternatively, clicking the right mouse button acts as shortcut to perform the most obvious action; right clicking on a person, for example, will cause Guybrush to talk to them.

The player can also bring up their inventory, which appears as an open chest taking up most of the screen and containing all of the items which Guybrush has collected. By clicking and dragging items around the screen, the player can attempt to use them with other objects in the inventory (for example, combining a diamond with an engagement band to make a diamond ring), or with objects or people in the current scene.

At the start of the game, the player may choose between two difficulty levels: a normal mode, or a "Mega-Monkey" mode with more puzzles to solve. Similarly, during the game's third chapter, a choice is offered to either have Guybrush's crew assist with ship-to-ship sea combat, or for the player to have full control during these battles.

== Plot ==
Following the events of Monkey Island 2, Guybrush Threepwood has regained his adult form and escaped from the zombie pirate LeChuck's "Carnival of the Damned". Drifting to Plunder Island, he finds his love interest Elaine Marley under siege by LeChuck. Guybrush is captured and encounters Wally, the diminutive cartographer from the previous game. His actions in escaping cause LeChuck to drop a "voodoo cannonball" which explodes, seemingly obliterating the villain. Guybrush proposes to Elaine using a diamond ring he found in LeChuck's treasure hold, but Wally reveals that it carries a curse. Elaine is transformed into a gold statue and soon stolen by pirates. Guybrush receives guidance from the Voodoo Lady, who assisted him in his prior adventures. She tells him that to save Elaine, he must replace the ring with a non-cursed one of greater value which can be found on Blood Island.

Through actions involving a chicken restaurant, a barber shop, a theater performance, caber tossing, a banjo duel, ventriloquism and an exclusive beach club, Guybrush recovers Elaine, obtains a map to Blood Island, commandeers a ship and assembles a crew of three pirate barbers. However, the map is soon stolen by the vain Captain Rottingham. By engaging in sea battles with other pirates, Guybrush acquires treasure to upgrade his ship's cannons, and learns enough barbs and retorts to defeat Rottingham in rhyming insult sword fighting. Guybrush's ship is caught in a storm and crashes on Blood Island. Meanwhile, LeChuck returns as a fiery demon still bent on eliminating Guybrush and forcing Elaine to become his bride.

On Blood Island, Guybrush encounters the cannibals from Monkey Island, now volcano-worshipping vegetarians. He also finds Stan, a salesman from the previous games, who sets up an insurance business. Guybrush's quests on the island involve a hotel, nacho cheese, a hangover cure, tofu, crypts, a talking skull named Murray, a broken lighthouse, and a makeshift compass. He meets the ghost of a debutante who was seduced by LeChuck, who stole the diamond from her heirloom engagement ring and sold it to smugglers on nearby Skull Island. Guybrush acquires her engagement band by reuniting her with another lost love, and cheats at poker to win the diamond from the smugglers. Putting the two together, he places the ring on Elaine's finger and breaks the curse, restoring her to normal. However, Guybrush and Elaine are swiftly captured by LeChuck's minions and taken to his Carnival of the Damned on Monkey Island.

LeChuck reveals that Big Whoop, the treasure Guybrush sought in the prior game, is actually a portal to hell which turns those who pass through it into immortal undead. When Elaine first spurned him, LeChuck set out to impress her by finding the secret of Monkey Island. His ship was caught in a typhoon, and he was marooned on Blood Island until a ship captained by Elaine's grandfather arrived. Learning that Captain Marley and his crew had a map to Big Whoop, Lechuck stole the debutante's diamond, sold it to the smugglers, bought a ship, and beat them to its location on Monkey Island, where he passed through the portal and gained supernatural powers. Marley and his crew divided up the map to keep anyone else from finding Big Whoop. LeChuck arranged the crew members' deaths, and sent Marley and his ship into a whirlpool. Dinky Island, where the map pieces led Guybrush, is an atoll off the coast of Monkey Island, connected to it by underground tunnels. LeChuck built the Big Whoop Carnival to lure sailors onto a roller coaster which carries them into a river of lava, turning them into his skeletal army.

LeChuck transforms Guybrush into a child, but he manages to break the spell and board the roller coaster. Jumping off at dioramas depicting scenes from the previous games, Guybrush improvises an explosive and sets off an avalanche, burying LeChuck under the theme park. Guybrush and Elaine marry and set sail for their honeymoon.

== Development ==
The Curse of Monkey Island was announced during the European Computer Trade Show in September 1996. According to Next Generation, the game's predecessors had been "relatively minor hit[s]" in the United States, but became blockbusters on the PC and the Amiga throughout Europe. Monkey Island creator Ron Gilbert had parted ways with the series after Monkey Island 2, and the new project leaders were Jonathan Ackley and Larry Ahern, both of whom had previously worked on Full Throttle (the interface of the game was adopted almost entirely). The lead background artist was Bill Tiller.

During production, examples of major changes include enhancing the role of Murray, the talking skull. Originally intended only to be featured in the first chapter, he proved so popular with test players that he was written to reappear at several points later in the game.

The game was later rereleased on a CD-ROM compilation of Monkey Island games, bundled with The Secret of Monkey Island and Monkey Island 2: LeChuck's Revenge called the Monkey Island Bounty Pack.

After the game shipped, a Monkey Island film was in the works. This was only brought to light when Tony Stacchi, a concept artist for the project, sent his work to The Scumm Bar, a Monkey Island fansite. The film was cancelled in the early stages of development but Tony Stacchi published the artwork on his portfolio.

=== Audio ===
Michael Land, who provided much of the music for the first two games, composed the score. The Curse of Monkey Island was the first game in the series to feature voice acting. The primary voice cast consisted of Dominic Armato as Guybrush Threepwood; Alexandra Boyd as Elaine Marley and Son Pirate; Earl Boen as LeChuck; Denny Delk as Murray, Skully, and Father Pirate; Neil Ross as Wally B. Feed; Alan Young as Haggis McMutton; Michael Sorich as Edward Van Helgen and Charles DeGoulash (Ghost Groom); Gregg Berger as Cutthroat Bill; and Leilani Jones Wilmore as the Voodoo Lady. Other voice actors included Kay E. Kuter as Griswold Goodsoup, Tom Kane as Captain René Rottingham and the Flying Welshman, Patrick Pinney as Stan, and Victor Raider-Wexler as Slappy Cromwell and the Snowcone Guy. Notables among the remaining voices include Mary Kay Bergman as Minnie "Stronie" Goodsoup (Ghost Bride), Gary Coleman as Kenny Falmouth, and future Angel star Glenn Quinn as Pirate #5.

=== Differences in localized versions ===
Non-English versions of the game omit the section at the beginning of the second CD, where Guybrush's crew sings the song "A Pirate I Was Meant To Be". In this section, the player as Guybrush has to stop the crew's singing - however, at each attempt, they just start a new stanza rhyming to the player's line, until he says a line ending with the word "orange" making the song unable to continue. As the whole section relies on Anglophonic rhyming, it was removed from non-English versions of the game.

== Reception ==
=== Sales ===
The Curse of Monkey Island sold 52,049 copies in the United States by the end of 1997, according to market research firm PC Data. Another 40,538 copies were purchased in the country between January 1998 and July 1998, which drew revenues of $1.57 million for the period. The game was a success in the German market: Heinrich Lenhardt of PC Gamer US wrote, "[I]f it wasn't for the sales figures in Germany, LucasArts probably wouldn't have bothered" to continue the franchise. In the second half of November 1997, Curse debuted at #4 on Media Control's computer game sales charts for the German market. It held in the top 10 through January 1998, peaking in third place for the first half of December, and its streak in the top 20 continued through March. The game had spent 24 weeks in Media Control's top rankings by the end of May, when it secured 27th place. In August 1998, Curse received a "Gold" award from the Verband der Unterhaltungssoftware Deutschland (V.U.D.), indicating sales of at least 100,000 units across Germany, Austria and Switzerland.

The game remained on shelves by 2001: that year, PC Data reported sales of another 19,552 units in North America. Louis Castle of Westwood Studios estimated The Curse of Monkey Island's lifetime sales at 300,000 copies by 2002, while LucasArts' Bill Tiller stated in 2003 that CMI sold over half a million units worldwide. Tiller recalled total sales between 700,000 and 800,000 copies in 2009.

=== Critical reviews ===
Reception

Aggregate score
Aggregator	Score
Metacritic	89/100

Review scores
Publication	Score
Adventure Gamers	3.5/5
AllGame	4/5
Computer Gaming World	5/5
Edge	8/10
GameSpot	9/10
Next Generation	3/5
PC Gamer (US)	95%
PC Zone	92%
PC Games	A

Computer Gaming World said that The Curse of the Monkey Island is a worthy addition in LucasArts's pantheon of the adventure games. GameSpot praised the cartoonish graphical style, the music, the pop culture witticisms, the characters, and the challenging but not frustrating puzzles. Next Generation remarked that the game is superficially attractive, with LucasArts's usual superlative production values showing in the music, artwork, voice acting, and animation, but suffers from uninspired puzzle design, a lack of a strong narrative pull, an absence of genuine innovation over the first two Monkey Island games, and a number of pop culture references that serve only to jerk the player out of the atmosphere. They concluded that the game is just barely fun enough to satisfy fans of the series. Just Adventure praised the game's music as enjoyable. Adventure Classic Gaming addressed plot criticism, saying "Some gamers may criticize the numerous farfetched plot twists in this game", while "some may just call it creative writing!", and Adrenaline Vault likened The Curse of Monkey Island to the adventure genre as a whole: "The twin vitals of an adventure game are a good plot coupled with strong dialogue. This game has both, in spades".

Although Adventure Gamers cited the graphic style's "refusal to take itself seriously" was adding "immensely to the game's charm", they found the secondary characters "criminally underdeveloped" and the ending as anticlimactic. The abrupt ending of the game received criticism from GameSpot, Just Adventure and Computer Gaming World, the last of which called it "the game's only real disappointment". PC Zone described that due to the introduction of cartoonish graphics "for Monkey devotees of the first two titles something tiny and almost intangible has been lost", while still scoring the game a 92/100, praising the voice over work and humor of the game.

In a retrospective review, RPGFan commented that the additions of detailed graphics and the spoken dialogue managed to take the story to a whole new level.

=== Awards ===
The Academy of Interactive Arts & Sciences nominated The Curse of Monkey Island for "Computer Entertainment Title of the Year", "PC Adventure Game of the Year", and "Outstanding Achievement in Art/Graphics" at the inaugural Interactive Achievement Awards, which were ultimately awarded to StarCraft, Blade Runner, and Riven: The Sequel to Myst, respectively. Similarly, the Computer Game Developers Conference nominated Curse for four Spotlight Awards, including "Best Adventure/RPG", but these ultimately went to other titles. However, it was named the best adventure game of 1997 by Computer Games Strategy Plus, Computer Gaming World, GameSpot and PC Gamer US. It also won GameSpot's "Best Cinematics" prize. The editors of Computer Gaming World wrote: "Simply everything is done right in this game: lush graphics, outstanding voice acting, strong storyline, clever puzzles, and, best of all, a script with more big laughs in it than just about anything at the movies these days. It is, easily, the most entertaining adventure in years".

== Legacy ==
In 1998, PC Gamer declared it the 33rd-best computer game ever released, and the editors called it "a grand, timeless adventure, sharply written and flawlessly voice-acted".

In 2008, Ron Gilbert praised The Curse of Monkey Island, calling it "great" and remarking that "they did an excellent job of capturing the humor and feel of the game".

In 2011, Adventure Gamers named The Curse of Monkey Island the 45th-best adventure game ever released.
