= Blue Pyramid =

Blue Pyramid may refer to:

- Blue Pyramid (The Gone Jackals album), 1998
- Blue Pyramid (Johnny Hodges and Wild Bill Davis album), 1966
