= Insecticide (video game) =

2008 video game

- North American Nintendo DS box art
- Developer(s): Crackpot Entertainment; Creat Studios
- Publisher(s): Gamecock Media Group
- Director(s): Larry Ahern
- Producer(s): Michael Levine
- Designer(s): Larry Ahern; Michael Levine; Jacob Stephens
- Artist(s): Peter Chan
- Writer(s): Josh Mandel
- Composer(s): Peter McConnell
- Platform(s): Nintendo DS, Microsoft Windows
- Release: DS: NA: March 11, 2008; AU: November 15, 2008; Windows: NA: June 13, 2008
- Genre(s): Action-adventure
- Mode(s): Single-player

Insecticide is a 2008 action-adventure game by Crackpot Entertainment and published by Gamecock Media Group for the Nintendo DS and Microsoft Windows.

== Gameplay ==
The game's genre is an action-adventure with an alternation between action levels focused on platforming and shooting mechanics, and detective levels characterized by interrogation and puzzle-solving.

== Plot ==
The game takes place in the crime-ridden city of Troi in a world where insects have evolved into the dominant life form and humans have degenerated into "hominids." The story follows two police officers from the Insecticide Division (a pun on homicide) as they try to solve a murder at the Nectarola soft drink company.

== Development and release ==
The game was the brainchild of Mike Levine and Larry Ahern, two former and longtime employees of LucasArts best known for their contributions to that company's library of classic graphic adventure titles. They are among many LucasArts adventure alumni, including artists, designers, sound engineers and composers, that comprised the game's team. The LucasArts legacy is evident in Insecticide's detective missions, which are designed as miniature graphic adventures complete with inventory puzzles and dialog trees. Much of the writing and design for these segments of the game are credited to Josh Mandel, veteran of Sierra Entertainment who worked on the King's Quest, Police Quest, and Leisure Suit Larry series among others.

The PC version was to be released as two downloadable episodes with a retail version following soon afterward, but the second episode never materialized due to Gamecock being acquired by SouthPeak Games in 2008 and the latter deciding to cancel the inherited title. Part 1 had by this time been released by Gamecock through digital distribution channels like Steam, Gametap and Direct2Drive, with Part 2 in production. Southpeak itself published a retail version of the first episode as part of their "PC Classics" budget line in early 2010 without any explanation about the story's unfinished state. Ahern revealed in a 2012 interview that Part 2 was cancelled due to "a whole host of complicated financial, technical, and marketing issues", and the fact the game did not sell well.

By comparison to the heavily scaled down Nintendo DS port, the Windows version features full in-game voice acting and all of the full motion video cinematics, some of which had to be transformed into a captioned "slide show" format or removed altogether for the handheld counterpart. In order to complete the story for Windows gamers, Crackpot expressed a desire to upload the cinematics for Part 2 (as well as Part 1) on their official YouTube page, an effort that at length came to fruition. In 2012, Levine posted the entire Insecticide cinematics on his personal YouTube account.

Both Ahern and Levine currently own the rights to Insecticide. Prior to the game's troubled release, Crackpot stated that they were interested in developing a sequel and even expanding the franchise to another medium. An animated series was considered, with Levine and Ahern putting together a series bible and shopping it to various networks without success. In 2012, Mike Levine publicly solicited fans for feedback on the possibility of a follow-up to Insecticide, one potentially designed as a pure graphic adventure game in the traditional style, and speculated on the possibility of raising money for the project via Kickstarter.
