= Roy Conrad =

American actor

- Born: November 11, 1940; Wisconsin, US
- Died: January 19, 2002 (aged 61); Roseville, California, US
- Occupations: voice and film actor
- Years active: 1989–2000

Roy L. Conrad (1940 – 2002) was an American actor, best known for his role as the voice actor of Ben in the 1995 LucasArts computer game Full Throttle.

== Early life ==
Conrad was born on November 11, 1940 in Wisconsin, the son of Roy and Myrtle Conrad. He graduated from high school in Roseville, California in 1958.

Conrad served in the Air Force for 4 years before attending Sierra College and Sacramento State University where he studied speech and broadcasting.

== Career ==
Conrad provided the voice of Ben in the LucasArts computer game Full Throttle. He has also appeared in another LucasArts game, Star Wars: Rebel Assault II: The Hidden Empire, as the rebel pilot Ace Merrick. Conrad also took smaller film roles in films such as Patch Adams, The Wizard, and a role in the 1993 television series Dr. Quinn, Medicine Woman.

One of the developers of Full Throttle had this to say when recalling how they cast the part of Ben:

Roy was one of the sweetest guys you'll ever meet, and a joy to work with. It was hilarious to watch him act, and see that stern, gravelly voice of Ben coming out of this gentle, soft-spoken man. Casting Roy was definitely the easiest decision we ever had to make at LucasArts. We had been through boxes of audition tapes without much luck--When you advertise that you're looking for a tough, biker character, you get a lot of guys trying to be tough; Growling, yelling, and forcing a lot of attitude--And then we put in Roy's tape, and out came this effortless, deep, rich, bass sound. And that was that. We didn't even listen to another tape.

== Personal life and death ==
Conrad died of lung cancer on January 18, 2002 in Roseville, California. He was survived by his wife, Lorraine.

== Filmography ==
Year	Title	Role	Notes
1989	Pink Cadillac	Barker	
1989	The Wizard	Bus Clerk	
1995	Casino	Board Investigator #2	
1995	Village of the Damned	Oliver	
1995	Full Throttle	Ben / Brother #12	Voice, Video game
1995	Trail of Tears	Jim Harris	TV movie
1995	Star Wars: Rebel Assault II: The Hidden Empire	Capt. Merrick	Video game
1995	Police Quest: SWAT	Herbert Long	Video game
1996	The Fan	Shopkeeper	
1997	Star Wars: X-Wing vs. TIE Fighter	Rebel Officer #2	Voice, Video game
1998	Patch Adams	E.R. Doctor	
1999	Diamonds	Pit Boss	
2000	Titan A.E.	Second Human	Voice
2001	Making Something Up	Newscaster	Final film role
