= Cyberpunk 2077: Trauma Team =

Comic book series by Cullen Bunn and Miguel Valderrama

- No. 1 cover art by Miguel Valderrama

Publication information
- Publisher: Dark Horse Comics
- Publication date: September 9, 2020

Creative team
- Written by: Cullen Bunn
- Penciller: Miguel Valderrama
- Letterer: Frank Cvetkovic
- Colorist: Jason Wordie

Cyberpunk 2077: Trauma Team is a comic series by Dark Horse Comics, set in the world of the video game Cyberpunk 2077. First published in September 2020, the series is written by Cullen Bunn and illustrated by Miguel Valderrama.

== Plot ==
Set in the year 2077, the plot follows Nadia, an EMT for the privately owned and heavily militarized healthcare company named Trauma Team International. When a shootout leaves the rest of her team dead, Nadia agrees to continue working for the company.

== Release ==
Trauma Team was created by Dark Horse Comics in partnership with CD Projekt Red, sharing the same setting as CD Projekt's video game, Cyberpunk 2077. Writing was led by Cullen Bunn (who had previously written for Harrow County, Uncanny X-Men, and X-Men Blue), with illustrations by Miguel Valderrama (who had previously worked on Giants with his brother, Carlos), colorizing by Jason Wordie, and lettering by Frank Cvetkovic.

The first announcement of the comic was made from the official Cyberpunk 2077 Twitter account on June 21, 2020, several days after confirmation that the release date for Cyberpunk 2077 would be moving back from September 17 to November 19, 2020.

The first issue in the Trauma Team series was released on September 9, 2020. This first issue was also made available in a limited edition bundle, featuring a variant cover and matching lithograph by artist Robert Sammelin. Volume 1 of the series, collecting together the first four issues, was released on February 9, 2021.
