= Larry Ahern (game designer) =

American video game designer

- Occupations: Game designer, artist, animator
- Employer: LucasArts

Larry Ahern is an American computer game designer, writer, artist, and animator. He is best known for being the co-project leader on The Curse of Monkey Island, alongside Jonathan Ackley.

== Career ==
Larry Ahern began his career as an artist and animator on Monkey Island 2: LeChuck's Revenge in 1991. He was lead animator on Full Throttle in 1995, and finished his tenure at LucasArts as co-project leader on The Curse of Monkey Island in 1997.

After leaving LucasArts, he joined Microsoft in 2001. While there, he worked as an artist on Blood Wake and Microsoft Flight Simulator X. After leaving Microsoft, he co-founded Crackpot Entertainment with former LucasArts alumnus Mike Levine. Through Crackpot Entertainment, they developed the action-adventure game Insecticide,. Part I of Insecticide for the PC was released in 2008. However, development of Part II of the game for the PC was never completed due to a lack of funding. In July 2012, all of the cut scene videos from Part II were released by Levine and Ahern on YouTube. In an interview, Ahern expressed the troublesome development of Part II with the publisher SouthPeak "the new publisher pretty much ignored us for a month or two while they "evaluated" the prospects of our title, which also wasn't a good sign. They ultimately decided not to publish Part II, and we never got much of an explanation, but I'm guessing someone there with a calculator was predicting trouble with the whole venture. Either that or they were just creeped out by bugs.".

He has since been working freelance creating interactive entertainment for amusement parks. In this function, he co-designed Walt Disney World's Sorcerers of the Magic Kingdom with his former Curse of Monkey Island co-lead, Jonathan Ackley, in 2012.

== Games ==
Year	Title	Role	Developer
1991	Monkey Island 2: LeChuck's Revenge	Artist, animator	LucasArts
1992	Super Star Wars	Artist, animator	LucasArts
1993	Zombies Ate My Neighbors	Additional art	LucasArts
1993	Star Wars: Rebel Assault	Additional art	LucasArts
1993	Day of the Tentacle	Artist	LucasArts
1993	Sam & Max Hit the Road	Artist	LucasArts
1995	Full Throttle	Lead animator	LucasArts
1997	The Curse of Monkey Island	Co-project leader	LucasArts
2001	Blood Wake	Artist	Stormfront Studios
2006	Microsoft Flight Simulator X	Artist	Aces Game Studio
2008	Insecticide	Co-project leader	Crackpot Entertainment
2012	Sorcerers of the Magic Kingdom	Co-designer	The Walt Disney Company
