= Blue Pyramid (The Gone Jackals album) =

Studio album by The Gone Jackals
- Released: 1998
- Genre: Rock
- Length: 43:05
- Label: Blue/Black Records
- Producer: Keith Karloff

The Gone Jackals chronology
Bone to Pick (1995)	Blue Pyramid (1998)

Professional ratings
Review scores
Source	Rating
Allmusic	2/5 stars

Blue Pyramid from 1998 is the third studio album of the hard rock group The Gone Jackals. It was produced by Keith Karloff, who also provided the lead vocals, apart from Evil Twin Sisters which is sung by Judd Austin.

== Track listing ==
1. "Covering Hallowed Ground" – 4:01
2. "Business As Usual" – 2:55
3. "Alone At Last" – 2:50
4. "Crank It Up!" – 3:18
5. "No Sign Of Rain" – 5:16
6. "Bustin' A Move" – 3:00
7. "13x" – 5:06
8. "Evil Twin Sisters" – 2:13
9. "That Blows My Mind" – 3:48
10. "Barrel Of Crabs" – 2:22
11. "Keep It Under Your Hat" – 2:16
12. "Blue Pyramid" – 5:00

All songs were written by Keith Karloff, except for Alone At Last and That Blows My Mind which were written by Karloff, Austin and Maynard.

== Crew ==
- Keith Karloff - Vocals & guitar
- Judd Austin - Guitars & vocals
- R.D. Maynard - Bass
- Trey Sabatelli - drums & vocals
