= Blood Wake =

2001 video game

- Developer: Stormfront Studios
- Publisher: Microsoft Game Studios
- Director: David Bunnett
- Designer: David Wessman
- Programmer: Ralf Knoesel
- Artists: Timothy Dean; Matt Small
- Writer: Dave Ackerman
- Platform: Xbox
- Release: NA: December 28, 2001; PAL: March 14, 2002
- Genre: Vehicle combat
- Modes: Single player, Multiplayer

Blood Wake is a naval combat video game released in 2001 for the Xbox as part of Microsoft's wave of launch titles. It was developed by Stormfront Studios and published by Microsoft Game Studios.

Set in an Asian-themed fictional world, Blood Wake is a story-driven, mission-based high seas action game in which the player controls a series of small fighting vessels.

First unveiled at E3 2001, the game received mixed reviews from critics according to the aggregate website Metacritic. It sold enough copies to be added to Microsoft's budget line, known as Platinum Hits.

== Gameplay ==
Blood Wake is a water combat game featuring various types of boats and ordnance.

The game features a wide variety of naval vessels, from tiny sampans to powerful speedboats and torpedo boats, on up to destroyers and a massive battleship. Over a dozen of these are playable and most have multiple weapon configurations. The weapon types include the standard chain guns, cannon, torpedoes, rockets and mines, plus some unique weapons that are unlocked as you progress through the game. Each boat has machine guns or chain guns as its base, primary armament. Most have one or more heavy weapons as their secondary armament.

The single player story-mode consists of 28 missions featuring a wide variety of attack, defense, escort and raid mission types. These missions take the player to many exotic locales and though the player never leaves the water, the game engine allows the designers to vary the sea and sky conditions to create very different gameplay environments. There is also a multiplayer mode that supports a variety of game types for up to four players. The multiplayer options are somewhat limited at first, but progress through the story mode unlocks many new options. The game also features numerous easter eggs such as special boats and hidden game modes, including the development team's favorite, "Blood Ball", which is essentially multiplayer soccer-on-water using a 10-meter diameter soccer ball and heavily armed gunboats.

There are many different vehicles at the player's disposal in Blood Wake. In the Story Mode the player is assigned a particular boat for each mission. The first is the Speedboat, and each of the mission of the first act features a different variant. As the story progresses, the player is introduced to ever more powerful boats, including a few captured enemy vessels. All of these plus several more are playable in the multiplayer Battle Mode. The following are the main types used by the player during the Story Mode missions:

- Speedboat: small, fast boat with light weaponry. This is the boat given to the player in the first chapter of Story Mode. Its armament usually consists of four chain guns or auto-cannons, but later adds a rocket launcher. The boat is completely stripped of all armaments for one special mission involving a time trial-style race. In one special mission later in the game it is armed with the Stinger, an extremely powerful, but short-ranged electrical weapon.
- Catamaran: the game's signature boat, this is featured on the game's cover. Standard armament for this vessel includes two chain guns or auto cannons, with a center mount that may have a rocket launcher, the Stinger, or the Wave Gun (another special weapon type that generates a wave that can detonate torpedoes and sea mines as well as jolt smaller vessels. In addition, it has a pair of side mounts that may hold torpedo launchers or fixed cannons. These weapons differ in combination depending on the model of Catamaran.
- Gunboat: modeled on a cigarette boat, it is one of the fastest in the game. Its armament is virtually the same as the catamaran, but it adds a rear mount for a mine launcher.
- Devil Boat: at 75 feet long, this is the largest and most heavily armed playable boat in the game. Inspired by the PT boats of World War II, it has four forward mounts for its primary armament of auto cannons or chain guns. Its secondary armament features dual center mounted rocket launchers, a rear-mounted mine launcher, and four side mounts. The side mounts may have two fixed cannons on the forward pair plus two torpedo launchers on the rear pair, or four torpedo launchers.
- Hydroplane: The ultra-speedy hydroplane is the fastest and most maneuverable vessel in the game. Modeled on the racing boat Miss Budweiser, its armament is the same as the Gunboat.

== Plot ==
The player controls Lieutenant Shao Kai, a former naval officer of the Northern League fleet who was betrayed and left for dead by his brother, Admiral Shao Lung. Kai is rescued by a band of sea raiders known as the Shadow Clan, and joins them after proving himself worthy to their leader, Ped Zeng. He will bide his time with them awaiting his chance for revenge against his brother. Here he meets a formidable young woman who advises Ped and becomes the love interest. The Shadow Clan spends most of its time preying on the third faction in the game, the Jade Kingdom, who are primarily a mercantile power led by Lord Sri Brana. All are now in the path of Admiral Shao Lung's ambitions to create the Iron Empire. Lung has developed a monstrous warship named the Dragon and a powerful magic amulet to defeat anyone and anything in his way.

== Development ==
Initial development began following the creation of the basic game engine by lead programmer Ralf Knoesel during his holiday break following the completion of Stormfront's previous release, Hot Wheels Turbo Racing. Together with lead artists Tim Dean and Matt Small, they conceived a concept that was essentially "Twisted Metal on water." The team received permission to develop a prototype and Stormfront started looking for a publisher, and eventually settled on Microsoft, which was looking for a suitable development partner for an original IP they had developed that was likened to "Crimson Skies on water." While Stormfront's engine had been designed to support arena combat, they were confident it could be adapted to support the story-driven mission-based structure needed by Microsoft. Music was composed by Robb Mills.

== Reception ==
Reception

Aggregate score
Aggregator	Score
Metacritic	71/100

Review scores
Publication	Score
AllGame	2.5/5
Edge	4/10
Electronic Gaming Monthly	6.33/10
Game Informer	5/10
GamePro	2.5/5
GameRevolution	B
GameSpot	7.9/10
GameSpy	75%
GameZone	8.5/10
IGN	8.4/10
Official Xbox Magazine (US)	7.4/10
Maxim	10/10

Blood Wake received average reviews from critics according to Metacritic. In March 2017 GamesRadar+ staff named Blood Wake one of the original Xbox franchise they would like to see revived.

The game was not an Xbox launch title, since its debut was part of a second wave of game releases thirty days after the first launch. It was highly anticipated following the excited press reaction at the 2000 E3. Microsoft backed Blood Wake with a television advertising campaign on release, and it reached sixth on the NPD sales charts in November 2002 with over 340,000 units sold, and later that year was the #1 game on the NPD Xbox game rental rankings. With strong sales the game became one of the first in Microsoft's Platinum Hits and was re-released with new box cover art and a lower price.
