= Full Throttle (1995 video game) =

- Cover art
- Developer: LucasArts (Note: The remastered version was developed and published by Double Fine Productions.)
- Publishers: LucasArts; Double Fine Productions (remastered); Xbox Game Studios (Xbox One)
- Designer: Tim Schafer
- Artist: Peter Chan
- Writer: Tim Schafer
- Composer: Peter McConnell
- Engine: SCUMM
- Platforms: MS-DOS; Mac OS; Windows; PlayStation 4; PlayStation Vita; OS X; iOS; Linux; Xbox One
- Release: May 19, 1995: MS-DOS, Mac OS; NA/EU: May 19, 1995 Win, PS4, Vita; WW: April 18, 2017 OS X; WW: June 3, 2017 iOS; WW: July 20, 2017 Linux; WW: July 29, 2017 Xbox One; WW: October 29, 2020
- Genre: Graphic adventure
- Mode: Single-player

Full Throttle is a 1995 graphic adventure video game developed by LucasArts and designed by Tim Schafer. It was Schafer's first game as project lead and head writer and designer, after having worked on other LucasArts titles including The Secret of Monkey Island (1990), Monkey Island 2: LeChuck's Revenge (1991), and Day of the Tentacle (1993). Set in the near future, the story follows motorcycle gang leader Ben, who must clear his name after being framed for the murder of a beloved motorcycle manufacturing mogul. A remastered version was developed by Double Fine Productions and was released in April 2017 for Windows, PlayStation 4 and PlayStation Vita, with later ports for iOS and Xbox One.

Full Throttle was LucasArts' eleventh adventure game overall and the tenth to use the company's in-house game engine SCUMM. It featured full-motion video and action sequences, using LucasArts' INSANE animation engine. It was the first LucasArts game to be distributed only on CD-ROM. It introduced a contextual pie menu through which the player controls interactions with objects and characters. In contrast to other video games of the era, which mostly relied on in-house talent for their voice acting, Full Throttle used mostly professional voice actors, including Roy Conrad as Ben, Mark Hamill as the villainous Adrian Ripburger, Hamilton Camp as the elderly Malcolm Corley, and Kath Soucie as Ben's ally Maureen. It was one of the few LucasArts games to use licensed music, featuring songs by rock band The Gone Jackals.

== Gameplay ==
Ben, the protagonist, converses with Maureen upon their first encounter. Dialogue options are presented near the bottom of the screen.

Full Throttle is a single-player video game in which the player controls the actions of the player character from a third-person perspective using a point and click interface. Players can move the player character to any place on the scene, interact with objects that are highlighted by the cursor, or leave scenes via exits - either on foot for most scenes, or via the character's motorbike, both types denoted by their own icon. Dialogue plays a large part, presenting story elements and information necessary to advance, as well as fleshing out the characters. During conversations, several choices of dialogue are presented. The selected choice is highlighted, and once clicked, the player character responds with the selected choice. Choosing the correct response allows to advance the conversation and ultimately advance the scene.

Following on from LucasArts' previous graphic adventure, Sam & Max Hit the Road (1993), which introduced an inventory and interaction system to replace those of their prior games, Full Throttle continued to refine on the changes introduced in Sam & Max Hit the Road: objects or characters with which Ben can interact are indicated by a red square appearing around the cursor's crosshairs when it is placed over the object. When this occurs, holding down the control on this causes a contextual pie menu to appear - designed upon the emblem of Ben's biker gang: a flaming circle topped by a skull and flanked by a boot and a gloved hand. The player hovers the cursor over elements of the emblem and then releases the mouse button to attempt various interactions with the object; for example, selecting the skull's mouth to speak to a character, its eyes to examine an object, or the hand to pick up, use, or pull the object. Right-clicking anywhere on the screen brings up the player's inventory of collected objects, which can be examined or dragged and dropped in order to use them with other items in the inventory, or with objects or characters in the scene.

== Plot ==
The last domestic motorcycle manufacturer in the country is Corley Motors, whose founder and CEO, the elderly Malcolm Corley (Hamilton Camp), is en route to a shareholders meeting at the Corley factory, accompanied by his vice president, Adrian Ripburger (Mark Hamill). Malcolm suspects that Ripburger is scheming to take over the company, as he is suspicious of Ripburger's plan to recruit a biker gang to ride with them to the meeting. Malcolm's limousine is overtaken by one such gang, the Polecats, and he is impressed with them. Catching up to them at a biker bar, he befriends their leader, Ben (Roy Conrad). Ripburger offers to hire the Polecats to escort Malcolm to the meeting, but when Ben declines, he is knocked out by Ripburger's henchmen, Bolus (Jack Angel) and Nestor (Maurice LaMarche).

Ben awakens to learn that the Polecats have been duped into escorting Malcolm, and that an ambush is planned for them further up the road. He tries to catch up, but his motorcycle has been sabotaged, resulting in a fiery crash. He is taken by photographer Miranda (Pat Musick) to the town of Melonweed, where he is treated by mechanic Maureen (Kath Soucie). Maureen describes how her father taught her about motorcycles, and repairs Ben's bike after he retrieves necessary parts, adding a booster to it as well. Ben catches up to the Polecats at a rest area, but is too late: Ripburger bludgeons Malcolm and frames the Polecats for the crime. Miranda manages to catch the attack on photos, but her camera is snatched by Bolus. Before dying, Malcolm tells Ben of Ripburger's plan to take over Corley Motors and produce minivans instead of motorcycles; he reveals that Maureen is secretly his illegitimate daughter and begs Ben to convince her to take over the company. Bolus tries to kill Maureen, but she manages to escape with the film from Miranda's camera.

With the Polecats jailed for Malcolm's murder, Ben is a fugitive. Miranda tells him about her film, and Ben convinces semi-trailer truck driver Emmet to sneak him and his motorcycle past a police roadblock and to an abandoned farm where Maureen is hiding. He is stranded there when Emmet steals his motorcycle's fuel line and Maureen steals his booster fuel. Emmet is killed by a biker gang called the Cavefish, destroying the bridge over Poyahoga Gorge, which Ben needs to cross. Having replaced his fuel line and gotten advice from the Polecats' former leader, Father Torque (Hamilton Camp), Ben outwits Nestor and Bolus and battles with members of rival biker gangs in order to acquire hover equipment, booster fuel, and a ramp, with which he is able to jump his motorcycle over the gorge.

Ben locates Maureen, who is a member of rival biker gang the Vultures, at the Vultures' hideout, a large cargo aircraft. Maureen believes Ben killed her father but Ben reveals personal information that Malcolm shared with him and convinces her to develop Miranda's film, which shows that Ripburger was the murderer. Ben suggests exposing Ripburger at the shareholders meeting, but Ripburger has postponed the meeting until he is sure Ben and Maureen are dead. The Vultures come up with a plan to fake Ben and Maureen's deaths by entering them in a demolition derby under false identities that will be obvious to Ripburger. Their cars are rigged to explode, but Ben is protected by a fireproof suit and Maureen's car ejects her safely out of the stadium. The plan works and results in the deaths of Bolus and Nestor, while the Vultures recover the winner's prize: a special motorcycle built by Malcolm and Maureen that contains a hidden pass code to Malcolm's safe, in which Ben finds Malcolm's recorded will and testament. Ben exposes Ripburger during the shareholders meeting by projecting Miranda's photos of the murder and playing Malcolm's will, in which he leaves leadership of Corley Motors to Maureen and exposes Ripburger as a sham. Ripburger flees in a semi-trailer truck.

As Ben and Maureen ride in the countryside, Ripburger reappears and rams them. The Vultures arrive driving their flightless cargo plane, which scoops up the truck along with Ben, Maureen, and Ben's bike. The plane and truck wind up hanging over the edge of Poyahoga Gorge, and Ripburger falls to his death, while Maureen and the Vultures flee the plane with Ben escaping at the last second just as the truck explodes and it and the plane fall into the gorge. Members of the biker gangs attend Malcolm's funeral, at which Father Torque delivers a eulogy. Maureen takes over Corley Motors, and despite her desire to remain in touch with Ben, he explains they are in two different classes and should not associate. Ben leaves.

== Development ==
The concept of Full Throttle originated following the 1993 release of LucasArts’ previous adventure game Day of the Tentacle. The company wanted to create a game that could revitalize the genre, and could offer LucasArts greater financial success than its earlier projects, such as the commercially unsuccessful Monkey Island series. Convening its designers, LucasArts expressed to them the idea and encouraged the staff to suggest potential conceptual avenues for the game. The company specifically asked Day of the Tentacle co-designers Tim Schafer and Dave Grossman to submit a design document outlining games that the two planned to develop afterward. At LucasArts’ request, Schafer and Grossman collaborated to propose prospective third entries in the Monkey Island and Maniac Mansion series. However, Schafer was willing to helm a project by himself, and he proceeded to develop concepts separately from Grossman that summer. Full Throttle was among the five concepts that Schafer submitted to LucasArts; according to Schafer, he produced "a pitch for a spy game, a Day of the Dead game, and a biker game" that later evolved into Full Throttle. Schafer later said that management "hated" the initial pitch, but he revised the design and repitched it with greater success. Edge reported that "it was eventually greenlit on Schafer's assurance that it would be a hit", as he felt that its protagonist and concept were "more commercial" than the company's earlier adventures.

According to Schafer, he came up with the idea for Full Throttle while listening to a traveller's tales about time spent in an Alaskan biker bar. As he listened, it occurred to him that "bikers are kind of like pirates — like another culture that people don't have a window into most of the time, but [which] has its own rules", and might provide a neat alternative to a fantasy setting. He began his research into biker culture, reading Hunter S. Thompson's Hell's Angels: The Strange and Terrible Saga of the Outlaw Motorcycle Gangs. Schafer stated that the game had influence from samurai movies such as Yojimbo. The game originally would have featured an interactive sequence where Ben undergoes a peyote-induced hallucinogenic trip. This was eventually cut, because the developers could not get it to "work out" with the publisher. The concept eventually became the basis of Psychonauts. Schafer recalls the reaction from the management at LucasArts as being one of "'We can't believe we paid you to write this'", and that "they hated it". In an interview with Gamasutra, Schafer said that the biker aesthetics of the game were an appeal to fantasy. He stated that the team was depending "on the [player's] secret desire to be a biker: big, tough, cool. Riding a huge hog..." On the setting he noted that often it was mistaken for a post apocalyptic world, but he clarified that the setting was simply an alternate world which was more desolate than our own.

Developed for CD-ROM with a budget of $1.5 million, Full Throttle was powered primarily by LucasArts' SCUMM engine, however elements of the company's INSANE animation engine, previously used in Star Wars: Rebel Assault II: The Hidden Empire, were implemented so as to allow for improved full-motion video (FMV). The game features completely voiced dialogue, full-motion video, and a digital audio soundtrack. Project leader Schafer served as the game's writer and designer. Full Throttle has thus been called Schafer's first "solo" project, leading Schafer to quip, "I did it all on my own with about 30 other people". Production lasted one and a half years, which Schafer considered to be "crazy" for the era.

Full Throttle employed several voice acting professionals, such as Roy Conrad, Kath Soucie, Maurice LaMarche, Tress MacNeille, Hamilton Camp, Steven Jay Blum and Mark Hamill. Full Throttle was the first video game to employ mostly SAG-registered professional voice actors instead of relying on in-house talent, and featured a few pieces of licensed music. Schafer stated that Conrad's voice was a "huge part of making Ben Throttle a charming character". It was one of the few LucasArts games to use externally recorded music, courtesy of The Gone Jackals. Certain tracks from their album Bone to Pick were featured.

== Release ==
Full Throttle was released on May 19, 1995. At the time of its release, LucasArts adventure games were aiming to sell about 100,000 copies; Full Throttle broke that mark by selling over one million units. According to Edge, it was the first LucasArts adventure to reach this number.

== Reception ==
Full Throttle

Aggregate score
| Aggregator | Score |
|---|---|
| Metacritic | 86/100 |

Review scores
| Publication | Score |
|---|---|
| Adventure Gamers | 4/5 |
| Computer Gaming World | 4.5/5 |
| GameSpot | 8.7/10 |
| Next Generation | 4/5 |
| PC Gamer (US) | 90% |
| PC Magazine | 3/4 |
| Macworld | 4/5 |
| MacUser | 4.5/5 |
| PC Games | A− |

Award
| Publication | Award |
|---|---|
| PC Games | Game of the Month |

At aggregate review website Metacritic the game received generally favorable reviews, and has over time become a cult classic among adventure games. Critics generally praised the game's animation, voice acting and soundtrack, but many reviewers felt the game was too short.

A Next Generation reviewer called Full Throttle "the kind of game the Mac was meant for" and "a sheer joy to behold, even if you loathed Monkey Island with a seething, purple passion". Citing the futuristic setting, "kick-butt" soundtrack, outstanding voice acting, understated humor, and overall cinematic presentation, the reviewer gave it four out of five stars. Full Throttle later won Computer Gaming World's 1995 Readers' Choice award for "Adventure Game of the Year", although it was not among the editors' nominees. PC Gamer's Steve Poole also praised the game's sound, citing both the inclusion of The Gone Jackals' music and the professional voice acting as points of high praise. Poole did note that puzzles can at times be too simple, with an aesthetic of "find item A to use on item B". Commenting on the game's length, he noted that while short, "it's one wild ride while it lasts". Bernard H. Yee of PC Magazine had similar thoughts in his review. He too felt the game was short, but praised the game's cartoon-like animation and visuals, voice acting and soundtrack. He noted that some adventure gamers might "grouse at the action-arcade fight sequences or grumble at the long narrative sequences" but felt that the game was "impressive and attention-grabbing". PC Gamer US's editors later presented the game with a "Special Achievement in Musical Score" award, and argued that it "showed the world that every game can benefit greatly from a good musical score". The editors nominated Full Throttle as their 1995 "Best Adventure Game", although it lost to Beavis and Butt-Head in Virtual Stupidity.

Charles Ardai of Computer Gaming World felt that the puzzles were not challenging enough compared to similar games of the era. He did note that this was the "ideal starter game" for those players who were not comfortable with more complex and difficult puzzles. Ardai stated that players experienced in the adventure genre could still enjoy the game by treating it as a "highly interactive movie". Macworld's Tom Negrino felt that the new pie menu system was a refreshing change to the traditional adventure game interface. He also gave high marks for the lack of a game over sequence and noted that any time the player fails a sequence it simply resets. He further praised the game's writing, voice acting and soundtrack. In a review for GameSpot Jeffrey Adam called Full Throttle "arguably LucasArts' finest graphic adventure creation". Adam did note two flaws in his review. The first is during on-motorcycle action sequences with rival gang members, in which he notes that, even considering an unlimited number of attempts, the sequences relied too much on twitch responses. The second frustration Adam noted was that he felt sometimes he resorted to randomly clicking on whole areas of the screen in hopes of finding a clue. He felt that this method did not allow players to use deductive reasoning.

The game's humor was praised by PC Gamer's Steve Poole for its many LucasFilm and other cultural references. Other references found by Poole were nods to the 1964 film Dr. Strangelove and the 1993 LucasArts adventure game Sam & Max Hit the Road.

Entertainment Weekly gave the game a B+ and praised the soundtrack, and the humor.

Pyramid magazine reviewed Full Throttle and stated that "Full Throttle is a game that sets out from moment one to impress the hell out of the player. Each scene is painstakingly constructed, with an astonishing depth of detail and smart layout. More than that, the attitude that permeates the story, from the opening line, "Ripburger, you're dumber than dirt!" to the last unspoken farewell, brims with consistent biker panache. And it's not so much that you feel like you're there (often, you're glad that you're not). It's that you feel glad that you've been allowed to watch, and in many ways, direct the action."

Full Throttle was the second-place finalist for Computer Game Review's 1995 "Adventure Game of the Year" award, which went to Mission Critical. The editors noted that "it had wonderful graphics, animation and voice work and the story was good, too". It was also a finalist for MacUser's award for the best strategy game of 1995, which went to You Don't Know Jack.

== Legacy ==
=== Cancelled sequels ===
In spring 2000, LucasArts began production of Full Throttle 2, a sequel to continue the storyline of Full Throttle. Since Tim Schafer had left the company at the time, Larry Ahern, who was involved in the original game's development, was appointed the project lead and Bill Tiller, the art director. The story would have focused on Ben's efforts to foil a plan by a "large corporation" and the local governor to replace all paved highways with hover pads, robbing the bikers and truckers of their traditional ground. In the first half of the game, Ben would have prevented an assassination attempt on Father Torque, who now leads the anti-hovercraft rally, then team up with a "persistent undercover female reporter" to bring down the villainous governor. In Tiller's opinion, the sequel "was going to capture the feel of the first game yet expand upon the milieu". At the early stages, the project received positive feedback from other LucasArts employees but according to Tiller, it eventually fell apart because of disagreements on the game style between the production team and "a particularly influential person" within the management, which led to a series of "mistakes". The production ceased in November 2000, when 25% of the levels and about 40% of the preproduction art were complete. LucasArts never released an official statement regarding the game cancellation. Both Ahern and Tiller left LucasArts in 2001, after the game was cancelled.

In mid-2002, LucasArts announced Full Throttle: Hell on Wheels for Windows, PlayStation 2 and Xbox. It was to be an action-adventure game, with more emphasis on action and fighting than adventure, because the designers wanted it to feel more physical than the first. Hell on Wheels would have been set in El Nada, Ben's "old stomping ground", whose roads have been mysteriously destroyed. Ben believes that one of the new gangs introduced, the Hound Dogs, are behind this but discovers a more sinister and murderous plot. Together with Father Torque and Maureen, he would have thwarted the unnamed villain's plan and protected "the freedom of the open road". Sean Clark was named the project lead of Hell on Wheels and the development progressed smoothly until late 2003, when it was abruptly canceled. Just months prior to that, at E3 2003, a playable demo was shown and a teaser trailer was released by LucasArts. Then-president of LucasArts Simon Jeffery said that "We do not want to disappoint the many fans of Full Throttle, and hope everyone can understand how committed we are to delivering the best-quality gaming experience that we possibly can" in the official press release. Critics cited poor graphics compared to other 3D action adventures of the time and Tim Schafer's lack of involvement in the project as possible reasons for its cancellation.

Critics considered development of sequels to Full Throttle unlikely. LucasArts' interest shifted away from the adventure genre, and failure to develop two sequels presumably hindered the possibility of a third. Also, nearly all developers who were involved with the original Full Throttle in 1995 had since left LucasArts. LucasArts ceased all internal development in 2013, shortly after their parent company Lucasfilm was purchased by The Walt Disney Company. In a 2017 interview discussing the work on the remaster, Schafer said that he feels that the story of Full Throttle was essentially complete, and does not envision creating a sequel.

=== Remastered ===
A remastered version of Full Throttle was developed by Schafer's Double Fine Productions for release on Windows, OS X, Linux, PlayStation 4 and PlayStation Vita. The PlayStation 4 and PlayStation Vita versions are cross-buy and cross-save. The remastered version was released on April 18, 2017. Like Day of the Tentacle Remastered and Grim Fandango Remastered, the remastered version of Full Throttle includes updated graphics and sound, improved controls, and developer commentary. Similarly, the game allows the player to swap between the original graphics and sound with the remastered versions.

The game uses the original voice actors' dialog pulled from the original recordings, with Schafer calling Conrad's voice "irreplaceable". The remastered version premiered at the 2017 Game Developers Conference, where Schafer presented a remaking of a magazine pack-in demo that included recorded lines that had not been included in the full game. Schafer said that fans had been critical of Full Throttle's relatively short length of about eight hours compared to other LucasArts games at the time which could take up to 40 hours. However, as he worked at the remaster, player expectations have changed, and he felt that Full Throttle would be much better suited at its length in 2017, comparing it to other fully polished, short games like Inside.

A port for the Xbox One, published by Xbox Game Studios, was released on October 29, 2020.

=== Potential film adaptation ===
Duncan Jones had written a screenplay based on Full Throttle in 2021, and reached out to fans of the game in 2022 to try to help convince Disney to fund production of the work for the Disney+ service.
