= Amnesia Fortnight 2012 =

- Developer: Double Fine Productions
- Publisher: Double Fine Productions
- Designers: Brandon Dillon; JP LeBreton; Andy Wood; Lee Petty; Levi Ryken; Brad Muir; Tasha Harris; Nathan Martz
- Engine: Buddha, Moai
- Platform: Microsoft Windows
- Release: WW: November 19, 2012
- Genre: Various
- Modes: Single-player, multiplayer

Amnesia Fortnight 2012 is a bundle of prototypes made during a two-week public prototyping session in 2012 by Double Fine Productions, which was held in conjunction with the Humble Bundle group in 2012. Everyone that paid a minimum of $1 had the opportunity to vote on 23 concept ideas. After the completion of the voting period, Double Fine developed the top five voted ideas into game prototypes that became available to those that purchased the bundle after they were completed. There were also three bonus prototypes included, two from the first and second Amnesia Fortnight that were made into commercial games, and one prototype from the previous year's Amnesia Fortnight that hadn't been released to the public before that point. 2 Player Productions filmed a documentary about the making of the prototypes, which was included with purchase of the bundle. Amnesia Fortnight 2012 was later released on physical media as part of a special edition bundle.

== Hack 'n' Slash ==
Hack 'n' Slash was the prototype that received the most votes. It is a Legend of Zelda inspired action/adventure, where players solve puzzles by literally hacking the game: for example, inhibiting the game's speed to pass through fireball-laden hallways or instantly killing enemies by setting their health to 0. The project leader was senior programmer Brandon Dillon. A full commercial version of the game was announced on December 10, 2013. It was released in early access for Windows, Mac, and Linux on May 6, 2014, and the full version was released on September 9, 2014, for the same operating systems.

== Spacebase DF-9 ==
Spacebase DF-9, the prototype receiving the second most votes, is a simulation set in space. The project leader was designer-programmer JP LeBreton. A full version of the game was announced in October 2013 and released on October 27, 2014 with overwhelming negative reviews from press and consumers.

== The White Birch ==
The White Birch received the third most votes. It is an ambient platformer inspired by Ico and Journey. The project leader was art director Andy Wood.

== Autonomous ==
Autonomous was the prototype that received the fourth most votes. It is a retro-futuristic sandbox robot game. The project lead was art director Lee Petty. It was released as an expanded full free release for the Leap Motion controller on November 18, 2013.

== Black Lake ==
Black Lake received the fifth most votes. Originally only four prototypes were going to be chosen to be made, but Double Fine decided to greenlight one more. It is a fairytale exploration game whose project leader was senior artist Levi Ryken.

== Brazen ==
Brazen was a prototype created during the 2011 Amnesia Fortnight, which unlike the 2012 prototyping session, was not public. Double Fine decided to release it as a bonus with the 2012 prototypes. It is a Monster Hunter-style four-player online co-op game. Its art style is an homage to Ray Harryhausen films. The project leader was Brad Muir, the project leader of Iron Brigade.

== Costume Quest ==
Costume Quest was originally made as a prototype during the second Amnesia Fortnight in 2009, which wasn't public. Double Fine included the original prototype as a bonus with the 2012 prototypes. The project leader was lead animator Tasha Harris.

== Happy Song ==
Happy Song was a prototype from the first Amnesia Fortnight taking place approximately around 2007. This prototype would later become Sesame Street: Once Upon a Monster. Like Costume Quest, Double Fine decided to include the original prototype as a bonus with the 2012 prototypes. The project leader was lead programmer Nathan Martz.
