= Sesame Street: Once Upon a Monster =

2011 video game

- Developer: Double Fine Productions
- Publisher: Warner Bros. Interactive Entertainment
- Director: Nathan Martz
- Designers: Matt Franklin; Whitney Hills; Nathan Martz
- Programmers: Matt Franklin; Oliver Franzke; Bert Chang; Kee Chi; Dave Dixon; Anthony Garcia; Anna Kipnis; Joe Virskus
- Artist: Greg Knight
- Writers: Tim Schafer; Whitney Hills
- Composers: David Earl; Peter McConnell
- Series: Sesame Street
- Platform: Xbox 360
- Release: October 11, 2011
- Genres: Adventure, edutainment
- Modes: Single-player, multiplayer

Sesame Street: Once Upon a Monster is a Sesame Street video game developed by Double Fine Productions and published by Warner Bros. Interactive Entertainment in conjunction with Sesame Workshop. The game was released in North America on October 11, 2011 for the Xbox 360 console. Players use the Kinect controller to control pre-established Muppet characters such as Elmo and Cookie Monster, alongside new characters, such as Marco and Seamus, as they sing and dance. The game is separated into different chapters, with each chapter involving problem-solving skills relating to a different monster.

Though Once Upon a Monster represents Double Fine's first foray into licensed property, the title started as one of four smaller titles, alongside Costume Quest, Stacking, and Iron Brigade, during an "Amnesia Fortnight" period during Brütal Legend, and was later found to be easily adapted to the Sesame Street property. The original prototype of the game, titled Happy Song, was released for Microsoft Windows as part of the Amnesia Fortnight 2012 bundle on November 19, 2012. Microsoft developed and released another Sesame Street game that used the Kinect sensor, Kinect Sesame Street TV, on September 18, 2012.

== Gameplay ==
Once Upon a Monster is presented as a storybook divided into a number of chapters. Each chapter features a monster with some type of problem to be solved by the Sesame Street monsters Cookie Monster and Elmo; one chapter involves the new character of Marco who was the only attendee at his own birthday party. These chapters are then broken into a series of minigames that utilize the Kinect controller. In the example birthday party chapter, the games include a tandem race, represented as Elmo riding on the shoulders of Marco; one player, acting as Marco, shifts side to side to avoid rocks in the path or jumps to avoid fallen logs, while the second player as Elmo ducks at appropriate times to avoid being hit by tree branches. A subsequent game includes a lightweight dance game variant where the players must attempt to match moves by the other monsters on screen with their body. The chapter culminates in a big birthday celebration for Marco, where the players must then help him blow out the candles on his cake.

== Development ==
During the development of Double Fine's Brütal Legend, issues with publishers put the game's fate in question. To bolster the company, Tim Schafer had split the company into four groups over a two-week period to design prototypes for a new game. After this "Amnesia Fortnight", taking place around 2007–2008, the whole company reviewed the generated prototypes and found them to be sound ideas from which to build. After Brütal Legend was completed, they were told by Electronic Arts that there would not likely be a sequel; Schafer turned back to these four games and set the company to develop the titles further while selling the idea of these smaller games to publishers. Though Once Upon a Monster was the first game to be completed as a prototype during the Amnesia Fortnight, it was the fourth game published, following Costume Quest, Stacking, and Iron Brigade. The game was formally announced in February 2011 for a late 2011 release date.

Once Upon a Monster was based on a prototype developed by Nathan Martz, the lead programmer on Brütal Legend and who led the larger development for this game. The original game involved monsters singing and dancing, inspired by the antics of Sesame Street and The Muppets. In designing the prototype, Martz set about to make a game that was "uplifting", citing games like LocoRoco that he called "overtly and passionately upbeat". The game as a prototype was named Happy Song, and Martz considered it a "musical toy" where the player helped the monsters to create music. The initial prototype used more traditional controls, but Martz found that the game fit in well with the Kinect motion controller, particularly as the unit was aimed at the family market. The game includes aspects of physical, musical, and aesthetic activities, with the latter two being translated to become more physical with the use of the Kinect controller.

A dancing mini-game in Once Upon a Monster, where the new character of Marco (front center) dances along with Cookie Monster (left) and Elmo (right).

The original prototype featured unique characters designed by Scott Campbell, Double Fine's in-house artist. As they started to pitch the game for publication, they received comments that the game was a "natural fit" with the monster characters from Sesame Street. Schafer had initially excused the idea of producing a licensed work, something the company had not done yet to date. After hearing that Warner Bros. Interactive Entertainment and Sesame Workshop has signed a deal together, Schafer and Martz actively pursued the licensing deal with the two entities. Schafer, Martz, and several other Double Fine staff were childhood fans of the show, and once they were successful in negotiating the license for Once Upon a Monster, they felt it was important to stay true to the Workshop's vision; as Schafer described, he "felt this responsibility, just how serious it is to work with the characters, and how important they are". They visited the Jim Henson studio in New York twice to review and discuss the construction of the Muppets for the show, which they then translated into their game engine; the engine includes dynamic fur simulation and skeleton animations that mimic the behavior of the Muppets. While the game includes at least two Sesame Street characters, Cookie Monster and Elmo, the original character from Martz's prototype, Marco, remained throughout the game's development. Another monster in the game, Seamus, also came from Campbell's original sketches, and given a shy personality, only able to be lured out by providing him with clothes that fit his mood.

Once they had begun working with Sesame Workshop, Double Fine learned that the non-profit organization had several goals that they built into Sesame Street that were not immediately obvious, including a "Whole Child Curriculum" that helped to foster social and emotional development in children, and a "Healthy Habits for Life" aimed at nutrition and fitness, the latter which the Kinect controller would promote. They worked alongside the Workshop's Education Research and Outreach program, which reviews all Sesame Street-licensed products, to assure that the goals of the game would promote the mission of the Workshop. As a result, the game became what Mantz described as "emotional entertainment", teaching younger players "real human themes like shyness, friendship, bravery, sensitivity, empathy". While Schafer recognized that part of their job in developing the game was to promote the Workshop's educational goals, he also reflected that Sesame Street involves a good amount of humor; Schafer compared the performers that control the Muppets as live comedy performers, reacting to the situation as need be. Schafer and Martz also recognized that much of the humor is aimed at both parents and their children, and wanted to capture that for the game, allowing parents and children to play it together instead of letting the game be an "electronic babysitter".

== Critical reception ==
Reception

Aggregate scores
Aggregator	Score
GameRankings	80.56%
Metacritic	79/100

Review scores
Publication	Score
Game Informer	8.5
IGN	8.5

Once Upon a Monster received favorable reviews from critics. At Metacritic, it scores 79/100 (based on 26 reviews), and on GameRankings it scores 80.56% (based on 27 reviews). Game Informer's Jeff Cork called Once Upon a Monster "the educational game I've been wanting since I first had kids. It's approachable and easy for them to grasp, while still remaining enough of a game to keep me engaged, too."
