= AirHarp =

Musical instrument

AirHarp is a musical instrument that uses motion detection and software (of the same name) to create pitches. AirHarp was designed by Adam Somers in a weekend hacking session using the Leap Motion dev board. The original video showcases how the instrument works, and premiered in December 2012. Shortly after, in 2013, Somers developed a tech company named “HANDWAVY”.

AirHarp uses the Leap Motion USB motion sensor device to detect the finger movements of the player. It then transmits that information to the computer software that Somers has developed, and the software interprets it as a pitch. The software then plays whatever pitch was struck with an artificial harp sound. The software also responds to finger placement on the electronic string, giving the player control over articulation and expression. It works much like a synthesizer, because the software interprets signals sent by an accessory source.

AirHarp isn't currently linked to any specific genres of music.
