= Amnesia Fortnight 2017 =

Prototype video game bundle

- Developer: Double Fine Productions
- Publisher: Double Fine Productions
- Platform: Microsoft Windows
- Genre: Various
- Mode: Single-player

Amnesia Fortnight 2017 is a bundle of prototypes made during a two-week public prototyping session in 2017 by Double Fine Productions, which was held in conjunction with Humble Bundle in 2017. Everyone that paid a minimum of $1 had the opportunity to vote on 25 concept ideas from employees. After the completion of the voting period, the top two picks were developed into prototypes. In addition, Tim Schafer chose an additional prototype, and the Double Fine Productions staff that was working on Amnesia Fortnight chose another. This was done to give the team a bit of control, rather than have all of the choices be as a result of online voting. Double Fine developed these four concept ideas from employees into game prototypes that became available to those that purchased the bundle after they were completed.

In addition, fan projects were also included this year. Three fan pitches were presented in a video and everyone that paid a minimum of $1 could choose between the three pitches. All three games, Pongball, Amnesia Adventure and The Lost Dev Team were developed into prototypes by fans. The top choice, Pongball, was included with the Amnesia Fortnight downloads.

2 Player Productions filmed a documentary about the making of the prototypes, which was also released on YouTube.

== I Have No Idea What I'm Doing ==
I Have No Idea What I'm Doing, was Tim Schafer's choice. It is a multi-player virtual reality party game that was led by Zak McClendon. One player wears the headset, and the players not wearing the headset play using the standard display.

== Kiln ==
Kiln, led by Darek Brand, was the Double Fine Productions team's choice. Kiln was announced as a full game release by Double Fine in 2026.

== The Gods Must Be Hungry ==
The Gods Must Be Hungry, led by Asif Siddiky, was the top fan choice.

== Darwin's Dinner ==
Darwin's Dinner, led by Devin Kelly-Sneed, was the second fan choice.

== Pongball ==
Pongball was the top choice for the fan-developed prototype. It is a multi-player Pong game with pinball-like playfields. It was conceptualized by Kjell "lightsoda" Iwarson and led by Josh "Cheeseness" Bush.

== The Lost Dev Team ==
The Lost Dev Team was the second fan-developed prototype. It is a single player puzzle platformer akin to The Lost Vikings or The Cave. In the game, three game developers, a programmer, a musician, and an artist, have to use their unique skills to get past various puzzles. It was conceptualized by Anemone and led by Jennifer "Jenni" McMurray.

== Amnesia Adventure ==
Amnesia Adventure was the third fan-developed prototype. It is an adventure game with differently styled scenes, wherein an amnesiac adventurer relives past adventures through memories. It was conceptualized by Ben "TimeGentlemen" Ward of Size Five Games, and led by Jennifer "Jenni" McMurray and Eivind "flesk" Nilsbakken.
