= Double Fine =

American video game developer

Double Fine Productions, Inc.
- Type: Private
- Industry: Video games
- Founded: July 2000; 26 years ago
- Founder: Tim Schafer
- Headquarters: San Francisco, California, United States
- Key people: Tim Schafer (studio head)
- Products: Psychonauts series; Brütal Legend; Keeper
- Number of employees: 70 (est.) (2026)
- Parent: Xbox Game Studios (2019–2026)
- Website: www.doublefine.com

Double Fine Productions, Inc. is an American video game developer based in San Francisco, California. Founded in July 2000 by Tim Schafer shortly after his departure from LucasArts, Double Fine's first two games – Psychonauts and Brütal Legend – underperformed publishers' expectations despite critical praise. The future of the company was assured when Schafer turned to several in-house prototypes built during a two-week period known as "Amnesia Fortnight" to expand as smaller titles, all of which were licensed through publishers and met with commercial success. Schafer has since repeated these Amnesia Fortnights, using fan-voting mechanics, to help select and build smaller titles. Double Fine is also credited with driving interest in crowdfunding in video games, having been able to raise more than US$3 million for the development of Broken Age, at the time one of the largest projects funded by Kickstarter, and more than US$3 million for the development of Psychonauts 2.

The company continued to build on its independent developer status and has promoted efforts to help other, smaller independent developers through its clout, including becoming a video game publisher for these titles. Double Fine has also been able to acquire rights to remaster some of the earlier LucasArts adventure games, including Grim Fandango, Day of the Tentacle, and Full Throttle. Microsoft purchased the studio in June 2019 after previously taking over Psychonauts 2's publishing, bringing it into Xbox Game Studios. As part of a major reset of the Xbox division in July 2026, Double Fine was released from Xbox Game Studios, becoming an independent studio again.

== History ==
Double Fine was founded by former LucasArts developer Tim Schafer, together with some colleagues from LucasArts, in July 2000. In the years prior, LucasArts had started to shift development away from adventure games into more action-oriented ones as part of the general trend in the gaming industry. Schafer, who had just finished producing the adventure game Grim Fandango, a title which met with critical praise but was a commercial disappointment, saw others leaving LucasArts and was unsure of his own position there. He was approached by colleagues suggesting they launch their own studio to develop their own titles. Schafer departed LucasArts in January 2000, co-founding Double Fine later that year.

Schafer started Double Fine with programmers David Dixon and Jonathan Menzies in what was once a clog shop in San Francisco. After several months of working on the demo for what would become Psychonauts, a mixture of personnel from the Grim Fandango development team and other new employees were slowly added to begin production.

After the implementation of Amnesia Fortnights in 2011 as a means to find new titles to publish, the company is split into a number of teams with about 15 people each. Each team has the capabilities of fully developing a small game on its own, but for its larger titles, like Psychonauts 2, the company temporarily merges two or more of these teams, and with the option of unmerging the teams once the project is finished.

The company remains situated in San Francisco. The name "Double Fine" is a play on a sign on the Golden Gate Bridge that used to display "double fine zone" to warn motorists that fines on that stretch of road were double normal rates. Double Fine's logo and mascot is called the Two-Headed Baby, frequently abbreviated 2HB, an abbreviation also used for Moai, an integrated development environment. The Double Fine website is also host to seven webcomics, which are created by members of Double Fine's art team and are collectively referred to as the Double Fine Comics.

On June 9, 2019, during Microsoft's press conference at E3 2019, it was announced that Double Fine had been acquired by the company and was becoming part of Xbox Game Studios. According to Schafer, through the acquisition, Double Fine would be able to retain its independent nature but would not have to struggle with finding publishers for its games, a problem it has had in its past. Schafer spoke to Microsoft's Xbox Game Pass, a games subscription service for Microsoft Windows and Xbox users, as one favorable aspect of the acquisition. Schafer felt many of Double Fine's games, particularly Psychonauts and its sequel, do not have an aesthetic that people would necessarily pay the full price for, but the subscription approach of Game Pass lowers that barrier and would potentially get more people to try the game. Thus, Schafer felt that being acquired by Microsoft would allow the studio to continue to develop experimental games and allow these projects greater exposure. A month ahead of the release of Psychonauts 2, in July 2021, Schafer stated he was happy with Microsoft's handling of Double Fine; he called the acquisition a "limited integration" with Double Fine retaining all control on the creative elements while leaving the financial issues up to Microsoft to manage, and left the studio able to focus their creative skills on finishing the game without feeling any budgetary crunch. Double Fine and 2 Player Productions released PsychOdyssey, a 22-hour documentary on the making of Psychonauts 2 in February 2023.

Schafer said in August 2025 that the studio is presently working on original intellectual properties, such as Keeper, which has Lee Petty as its lead developer, and had no current plans for releasing sequels such as Psychonauts 3 or Brutal Legend 2 despite requests from players for these.

Double Fine submitted its petition to unionize within the CWA (Communications Workers of America) on May 7, 2026.

In June 2026, Jason Schreier of Bloomberg News reported that multiple studios at Xbox Game Studios, including Double Fine, were in negotiations for independent buyouts and separation from the division to avoid being shuttered. The studio laid off 23 out of around 90 employees in July 2026 following this transition, with Schafer saying "Only the survival of our studio would ever make us consider such a painful action. Our transition to becoming an independent company also means becoming a size that we can sustain."

As part of a major restructuring of the Xbox division on July 6, 2026, Double Fine was released from Xbox Game Studios and returned to being an independent studio. Double Fine retained all rights to games and intellectual property during this move.

== Projects ==
Double Fine's first completed project was Psychonauts, a multi-platform platform game following Raz (named after Double Fine's animator Razmig Mavlian), a psychically gifted boy who breaks into a summer camp for psychic children to try to become part of an elite group of psychic heroes called Psychonauts. Critically praised, it was released for Microsoft Windows, PlayStation 2 and Xbox. Despite its acclaim, however, it did not sell well initially.

Double Fine's second project was Brütal Legend, a hybrid real time strategy, action-adventure game following a heavy metal roadie named Eddie Riggs, whose name is derived from both Eddie the Head, the Iron Maiden mascot, and Derek Riggs, the artist who created the mascot. The story follows Eddie as he is transported to a fantasy world in which demons have enslaved humanity. Tim Schafer has credited the inspiration for the game to the lore, fantasy themes, and epic Norse mythology of heavy metal music found in both its lyrical content and its album art. Brütal Legend was published by Electronic Arts and was released in North America on October 13, 2009, for the PlayStation 3 and Xbox 360, and later for Microsoft Windows.

=== Amnesia Fortnight ===
During the development of Brütal Legend, a publishing issue arose. Activision, having acquired the rights to the title through its merger with Vivendi Games, decided to drop it and forced Schafer to locate another publisher. During this period, in approximately 2007, Schafer attempted to boost the company's morale by engaging the team in an "Amnesia Fortnight". For a two-week period, the employees were split into four groups, told to forget their current work on Brütal Legend (hence the "Amnesia"), and tasked to develop a game prototype for review by the other groups. The four ideas were successfully made into playable prototypes. The four prototypes produced were Custodians of the Clock, Happy Song, Love Puzzle, and Tiny Personal Ninja.

The process was repeated later, as Amnesia Fortnight 2009, near the end of Brütal Legend, providing an additional two prototypes. The prototypes produced were Costume Quest and Stacking. The prototype for Costume Quest was made available in 2012.

Schafer credits the concept of the Amnesia Fortnights to film director Wong Kar-Wai. During the long, three-year filming of Ashes of Time, Wong had taken some of his actors and film crew to Hong Kong to shoot footage for fun, ultimately resulting in the films Chungking Express and Fallen Angels. Schafer noted these were some of the director's more famous films. Schafer eventually signed a publishing deal with Electronic Arts for Brütal Legend.

Double Fine founder Tim Schafer (right) and Cookie Monster (left) during a promotional video for Sesame Street: Once Upon a Monster

These Amnesia Fortnight periods proved fortuitous, as Schafer considers these to have kept the company viable. Upon completion of Brütal Legend, Double Fine started work on its sequel but was told to stop development shortly after as Electronic Arts decided against publishing it. With no other publishing deals lined up at the time, Schafer turned back to the eight game ideas developed from Amnesia Fortnight, believing they could be developed further into short, complete games. Schafer also looked at the success of smaller focused games like Geometry Wars on the various download services, realizing the potential market for similar titles. Schafer and his team selected the best four, and began shopping the games to various publishers, and successfully worked publishing details with these. Two of these games, Costume Quest and Stacking, were picked up by THQ and released digitally on the Xbox Live and PlayStation Network storefronts. Both games were considered successful and THQ expressed interest in helping Double Fine produce similar titles. Iron Brigade was prototyped between 2008 and 2009 as Custodians of the Clock, and was originally released as Trenched before the title was changed due to trademark issues. It was developed as an Xbox Live Arcade game in association with Microsoft Game Studios, and similarly received positive praise from journalists. A fourth game, Sesame Street: Once Upon a Monster, expanded from the Happy Song prototype, was published by Warner Bros. Interactive Entertainment in association with the Sesame Workshop for the Xbox 360 using the Kinect controller. Though it initially was not a licensed title, Schafer and his team found it to be an ideal fit for its first licensed-property game. The four unused ideas may be used for a game in the future, according to Schafer, but believes some of them may be unsellable to a publisher.

The development groups for these games were headed by the former leads from Brütal Legend: lead animator Tasha Harris for Costume Quest, lead art director Lee Petty for Stacking, lead designer Brad Muir for Iron Brigade, and lead programmer Nathan Martz for Once Upon a Monster. This was to not only put these teams under people who had been in the industry for a long time, but as a means to help promote these leads. The remaining staff were split among the four teams, with some later swapping to make sure each team has appropriate resources when needed, such as artists and programmers. Double Fine did not have to lay off any of the staff during this time, and instead were able to hire Ron Gilbert, Schafer's former collaborator at LucasArts, to work on the new titles, as well as a future title that Gilbert has envisioned. Schafer stated that though it could likely make another large game akin to Psychonauts or Brütal Legend, it would likely keep the smaller teams to continue to work on these smaller titles, due to the gained experience shared by the company.

In 2011, the prototyping process was repeated in Double Fine's last private amnesia fortnight. The prototypes produced during this period were Middle Manager Of Justice, a superhero simulation game, Whispering Rock Psychic Summer Camp, a camp-building game based on Psychonauts, and Brazen, a Monster Hunter-style four-player online co-op game.

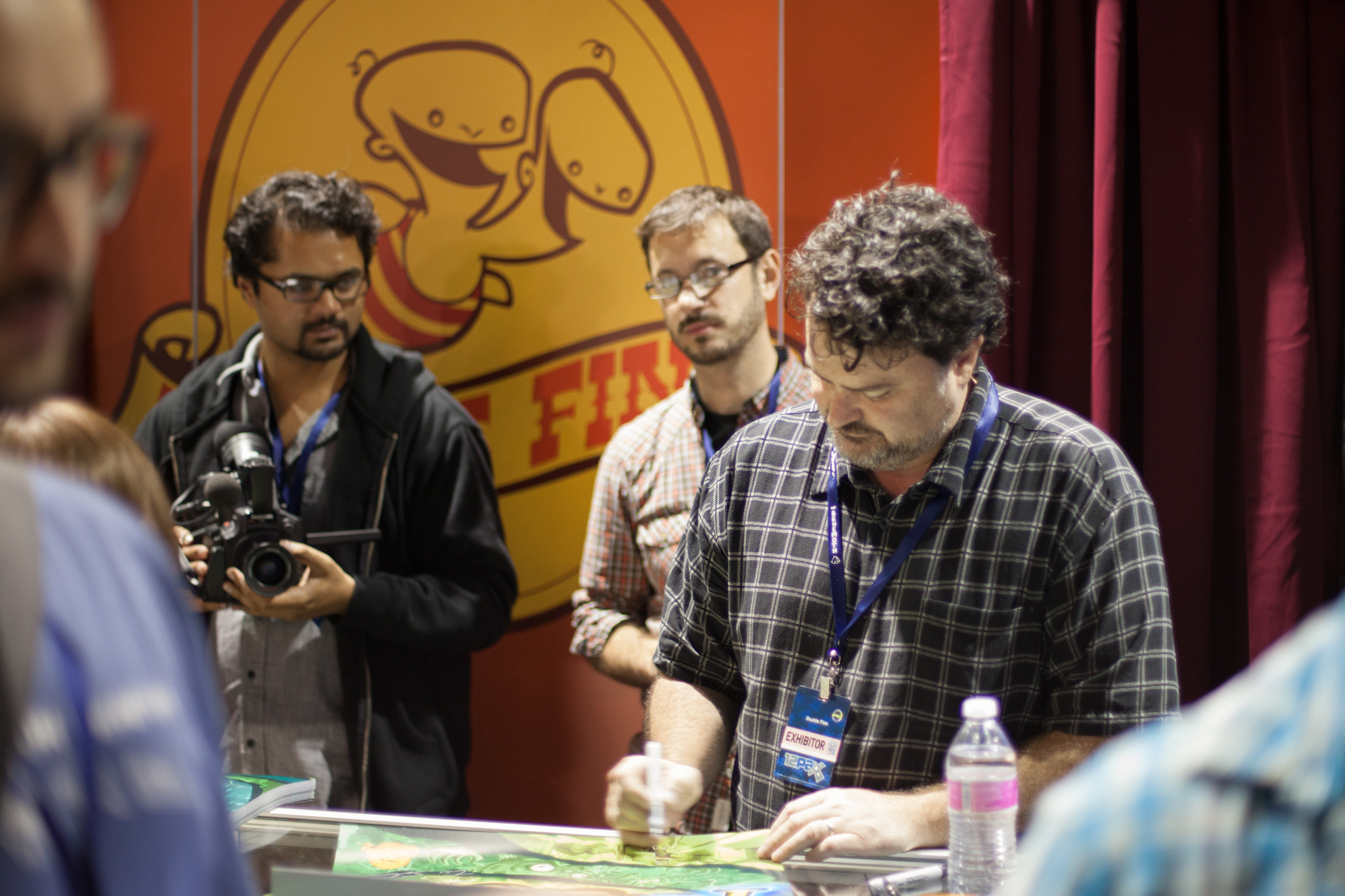
Tim Schafer and Drew Skillman with 2 Player Productions' Asif Siddiky at PAX Prime 2012

In November 2012, Double Fine, along with Humble Bundle, announced Amnesia Fortnight 2012, a charity drive based on the previous Amnesia Fortnight. During this, those that paid a minimum of US$1 had the opportunity to vote on 23 concept ideas. After the completion of the voting period, Double Fine developed the top five voted ideas into game prototypes that were available for those that purchased the bundle. The prototypes were (in order of receiving the most votes): Hack 'n' Slash, a The Legend of Zelda-inspired action-adventure, where players need to hack to solve puzzles, led by senior programmer Brandon Dillon, Spacebase DF-9, a sim game set in space, led by designer-programmer JP LeBreton, The White Birch, an ambient platform game (inspired by Ico and Journey), led by art director Andy Wood, Autonomous, a retro-futuristic sandbox robot game, led by art director Lee Petty, and Black Lake, a fairytale exploration game led by senior artist Levi Ryken. In addition, the purchaser received the initial prototypes of Costume Quest, Happy Song (what would become Once Upon a Monster), and Brazen, a Monster Hunter-style four-player online co-op homage to Ray Harryhausen, which was led by Brad Muir, who was also project lead of Iron Brigade. The development of the prototypes was documented by 2 Player Productions.

The Indie Fund announced at the Electronic Entertainment Expo 2013 that it provided funding for two titles from Double Fine. The first game created with Indie Fund backing was revealed on October 15, 2013, to be Spacebase DF-9, a fleshed out commercial version of one of the Amnesia Fortnight 2012 prototypes. The game was released as an alpha version on Steam Early Access, and was developed with user feedback received during the early access release period. Development was canceled at version "Alpha 6e" with the next patch released as the finished game. This release did include source code that was released to the community. Largely due to backlash from the abrupt end of development, Spacebase DF-9 has more negative user reviews on the Steam store than positive. The other game partially funded with Indie Fund backing was revealed on December 10, 2013, to be Hack 'n' Slash, another full commercial version of an Amnesia Fortnight 2012 prototype. Hack 'n' Slash was released through Steam Early Access in the first half of 2014.

An additional prototype from the 2012 Amnesia Fortnight, Autonomous, was released as an expanded full free release for the Leap Motion controller on November 18, 2013.

In February 2014, Double Fine, and the Humble Bundle group began another charity drive titled Amnesia Fortnight 2014. During this drive, those that paid a minimum of $1 had the opportunity to vote on 29 concept ideas. In addition, those that paid more than the average would get to vote on a concept idea for a prototype led by Pendleton Ward, the creator of Adventure Time. After the completion of the voting period, Double Fine developed the top voted ideas into game prototypes that were available for those that purchased the bundle. As with Amnesia Fortnight 2012, 2 Player Productions filmed the production of the prototype, which was available to people who purchased the bundle, as well as on a Blu-ray, along with the prototypes on a DVD, for those who paid a minimum of $35. The four pitches that were made into prototypes for Amnesia Fortnight 2014 were Dear Leader, an emergent narrative game led by Anna Kipnis, Little Pink Best Buds, a game about little pink creatures who want to be your friend led by Pendleton Ward, Mnemonic, a surreal, first-person noir adventure led by Derek Brand, and Steed, a game set in a storybook land full of inept heroes led by John Bernhelm. One idea, Bad Golf 2, was not selected as a prototype, but a group of Double Fine fans have started working on developing the title themselves, with the blessing of its conceptor, Patrick Hackett and permission of Double Fine.

In April 2017, a third charitable public Amnesia Fortnight was jointly held by Double Fine and Humble Bundle. For Amnesia Fortnight 2017, two prototypes were chosen from the 25 prototype videos by means of the top public votes. These were The Gods Must Be Hungry and Darwin's Dinner. A multi-player virtual reality party game prototype, I Have No Idea What I'm Doing, was chosen by Tim Schafer. Another, the four-player competitive game, Kiln, was chosen by the Double Fine team members that were working on Amnesia Fortnight. This was done to give the team a bit of control, rather than have all of the choices be as a result of online voting. In addition, three fan pitches for prototypes were included in Amnesia Fortnight 2017. All three fan pitches, Pongball, The Lost Dev Team, and Amnesia Adventure, were developed into prototypes. The top pick, Pongball, was included in the Amnesia Fortnight 2017 prototype downloads, and the fans were mentored by Double Fine developers.

Another Amnesia Fortnight was held in 2019 during their work on Psychonauts 2. The work during this period was documented by 2 Player Productions and used to create Amnesia Fortnight, a documentary about the Amnesia Fortnite process which was released in 2021.

After Double Fine was acquired by Microsoft in 2019, Amnesia Fortnights were not held. Following their returned to independence in 2026 following large cost-cutting measures at Microsoft, Double Fine announced a new Amnesia Fortnight to be held in September 2026, allowing participants via Kickstarter to vote which ideas are progressed into an estimated four new titles.

=== Dracogen funding ===
Double Fine has received financial investment from Steven Dengler's investment company Dracogen. The investment started as a result of a Twitter conversation between Dengler and Schafer in March 2011, where Schafer commented that the cost of bringing Double Fine's games to personal computers would be high. Dengler asked Schafer for a monetary value, though at the time Schafer believed Dengler was joking around and offered a value of around $300,000. As more formal conversations ensued, however, the company worked with Dengler to set an amount, signing an initial deal to bring Psychonauts to the macOS and to bring Costume Quest and Stacking to Microsoft Windows.

Following this initial agreement, a subsequent deal was made with Dracogen for three iOS mobile games, the first of which is Middle Manager of Justice. The game itself is based on another idea from the Amnesia Fortnights, a simulation game with RPG elements that involves managing teams of superheroes and then fighting as those heroes in battles. Dengler's children helped to provide some of the drawings of superheroes for the game. Middle Manager of Justice was released for iOS in December 2012, and the Android version was released on August 14, 2013.

Dropchord, a motion-based rhythm puzzle game for macOS, Microsoft Windows, iOS and Android, was as well financed by Dracogen. It was a launch title for the Leap Motion Airspace app store when the Leap Motion controller was released on July 22, 2013.

As of 2012, Dengler has invested about one million dollars into Double Fine, which Schafer said has "paid off for both sides". Schafer has said that Dengler's funding has allowed the company to realize the ability of self-publishing, and believes they would be able to self-publish a triple-A title with Dracogen's financial assistance.

=== Crowdfunding ===
In February 2012, Double Fine and 2 Player Productions announced a crowdfunding campaign through Kickstarter, initially codenamed Double Fine Adventure. It aimed to create a new adventure game featuring art by Double Fine's in-house artist Nathan Stapley. The Kickstarter effort was started because the adventure genre has been perceived as niche and commercially risky. The project aimed to collect $300,000 for the game's development and $100,000 for the filming of the game's development by 2 Player to be released alongside the game. The project reached its $400,000 funding goal in under nine hours of the month-long drive. Within 24 hours, Double Fine Adventure had raised more than a million dollars, becoming the most funded and most backed project ever on Kickstarter until it was surpassed by the Pebble watch in April 2012. The game was developed with Moai, and was released in two parts, Act 1 in early 2014 and Act 2 in April 2015. The game was ultimately named Broken Age.

On May 30, 2013, Double Fine started its second crowdfunding campaign through Kickstarter. The game, Massive Chalice, is a strategy video game for Microsoft Windows, macOS, and Linux, directed by Brad Muir.

=== Additional projects through publishers ===
Although Double Fine has experienced success through crowdfunding, the company has not renounced working with publishers. Its crowdfunding success has, however, granted it enough independence to be more selective about the publishers it works with and the types of publishing deals it was willing to accept. Talking to gaming news site Polygon, Schafer explained: "We've changed our relationship with publishers. They used to be our sole source of income. Now that we've been self-publishing, we can kind of pick and choose who we work with and work with publishers that have similar goals that we have...[who] have the same kind of mission and believe in the same kind of things we believe in."

In February 2012, the casual video game, Double Fine Happy Action Theater, was published for the Xbox 360 Kinect through the Xbox Live Arcade by Microsoft Game Studios. The title is less a game and more an interactive toy, in which the Kinect is used to create augmented video on the players' screen, putting the players into scenarios such as walking through lava or playing in a giant ball pit. Happy Action Theater was the first game to be directed by Tim Schafer since Brütal Legend in 2009, and came about during Once Upon a Monster, finding that his young daughter had difficulty with the Kinect precision and aimed to make a game that required far less precision but was still enjoyable. Its sequel, Kinect Party, featuring even more augmented reality scenarios, was published by Microsoft Game Studios in December 2012.

On February 22, 2012, Double Fine filed a trademark for the name "The Cave", later confirming that this was not related to the Double Fine Adventure project. In May 2012, it was revealed that The Cave was the title of an adventure and platform game developed by Ron Gilbert during his tenure at Double Fine. It was published by Sega in January 2013. Gilbert subsequently left the company on amiable terms to pursue other game development opportunities.

At PAX Prime 2013, it was revealed that Double Fine had a game in development that would be released as free downloadable content for The Playroom, the augmented reality mini-game compilation that utilizes the PlayStation Camera on PlayStation 4. Titled My Alien Buddy, it built on its experience on augmented reality that it gained while making Double Fine Happy Action Theater and Kinect Party for Microsoft. The alien buddy is a deformable toy with which the player can interact. My Alien Buddy was released on December 24, 2013.

On November 21, 2014, Double Fine announced that due to a publishing deal falling through, that it was forced to cancel an unannounced project and let 12 staff go.

As part of a deal with Nordic Games, who gained the publishing rights to Costume Quest and Stacking and the distribution rights to Psychonauts from the takeover of THQ after its bankruptcy, Double Fine took over all publishing rights, while Nordic Games retained and restarted distributing retail copies of all three titles for Microsoft Windows and macOS in early 2014.

=== Double Fine Presents ===
Double Fine announced in March 2014 that it would begin publishing indie games under the moniker Double Fine Presents. Using that program, Double Fine makes its publishing capabilities and offices available for other independent developers to help them finish their work by funding, publishing, and promoting it. The idea came about during the Amnesia Fortnight 2014, where local San Francisco independent developers were working alongside Double Fine in its studios during the two-week period, with the intent to help give them exposure through the production process as it was filmed by 2 Player Productions. The idea of Double Fine providing more long-term assistance to these indies arose during this event, forming the basis for this program. According to Double Fine's COO Justin Bailey, the goal of this approach is to "help indies build their own community and empower them with the knowledge and tools they need to succeed on their own", providing them assistance "customized to what indies need without also creating a certain codependence" that other publishing means require.

The first such game created in this fashion is Escape Goat 2, the sequel to Escape Goat, by MagicalTimeBean. This included a humorous video introducing both the game and Double Fine's program, which was filmed during the week of the 2014 Game Developers Conference in March 2014. For the second title, Last Life by Rocket Science Amusements, Double Fine helped to prepare and present a Kickstarter campaign to help funding the final development of the title. The third title announced under this program was Mountain by David OReilly, a procedural terrarium that provides an ambient, minimalist, zen-like experience full of secrets and mysteries. In August 2014, Double Fine announced that a fourth game would be released under the program, the multiplayer beat 'em up Gang Beasts by Boneloaf, which launched into Steam Early Access on August 29, 2014. The latest addition to the Double Fine Presents program is GNOG by KO_OP, a puzzle-adventure released in 2016.

Following Microsoft's acquisition of Double Fine in June 2019, the fate of the Double Fine Presents publishing label was unclear. Schafer stated in September 2019 that the fate of Double Fine Presents is unclear, but that while they would likely end up stop publishing, they would still likely engage with the community through the Day of the Devs events to support other independent developers. Ooblets changed to a self-publishing model following Double Fine's acquisition, while another, Knights and Bikes, remained under the label. Gang Beasts also turned to self-publishing by June 2020, as it described that Double Fine's publishing was "winding down".

== Day of the Devs ==
In 2012, Double Fine and iam8bit founded Day of the Devs, where they host an annual free festival in San Francisco with food, drink, and playable demos of unreleased indie games since 2012. Since 2021, they have partnered with Geoff Keighley's Summer Game Fest and Game Awards, to produce virtual showcases that run after each event, provided a platform for indie developers and teams to showcase their games to a broader audience.

== Double Fine Comics ==
Double Fine Comics
- Author(s): Scott Campbell, Razmig Mavlian, Nathan Stapley, Mark Hamer, Tasha Harris, and Gabe Miller
- Website: http://www.doublefine.com/
- Current status/schedule: Each comic updated at varying intervals
- Launch date: February 2004
- Publisher: Double Fine Productions

Double Fine Comics is a webcomics collective supported by Double Fine Productions. Each comic varies in style and tone, but they all reflect the eclectic humor found in the Double-Fine produced game Psychonauts. The webcomics were published in Adobe Flash format on the company website under the heading 'Comics'.

=== Double Fine Action Comics ===
Scott Campbell (also known as Scott C.) created a comic called Double Fine Action Comics. It follows the adventures of Two-Headed Baby (the Double Fine Productions logo), a strongman, and a knight. Other characters, such as two astronauts named Captain and Thompson, have been introduced as the comic has progressed. Many characters such as a mummy, a frogman and a naked ogre have been briefly featured, usually during a quest or some other type of adventure. At the top of most strips is a small, usually completely unrelated drawing. These small drawings sometimes have a title, such as "Mysterious Happiness!". The strip celebrated its 400th comic in December 2006. In August 2011, Scott implied the end of the comic with the deflation of 2HB and the solemn acceptance of both Knight and Strongman. The comic was resurrected in May 2012, before it returned to hiatus status a few months later.

In 2008, the first 300 comics were combined into a trade paperback called Double Fine Action Comics by Scott C (Volume 1). This volume includes a foreword by Tim Schafer.

In 2013, 200 more comics were combined into another trade paperback called Double Fine Action Comics by Scott C (Volume 2). This volume contains a foreword by Erik Wolpaw.

=== Epic Saga and Happy Funnies ===
Razmig Mavlian (also known as Raz) produces two comics. The first, Epic Saga, is done in the style of an adventure game similar to King's Quest or The Secret of Monkey Island. The last two comics were countdown screens, similar to the screens of arcade games, which seem to indicate that the strip is cancelled or currently on hiatus. Mavlian's other comic, Happy Funnies, is a dialogue-free strip featuring smiling characters in absurd situations. This strip appears to be on hiatus as well.

Epic Saga was the first comic to be made into a free flash video game by Klint Honeychurch. Epic Saga: Extreme Fighter is a simple low resolution fighting game which is available to play for free on Double Fine's website.

=== My Comic About Me ===
Nathan Stapley draws a pseudo-biographical comic that juxtaposes comics about his hair or clothing with adventure stories involving him and such characters as Indiana Jones, Chewbacca from Star Wars, or O-Ren Ishii from the Kill Bill films. The comic appears to be on hiatus.

My Comic About Me was the second comic to be made into a free flash video game by Klint Honeychurch. My Game About Me: Olympic Challenge is a mock sports video game that includes such events as eating and sleeping along with traditional sports games like surfing, but with obstacles to avoid.

=== Snapshots ===
Snapshots (formerly known as Polaroids) is a comic by Mark Hamer. He paints realistic pictures that resemble Polaroid photographs. Each feature a joke about the picture at the bottom of the photograph.

In 2013, the comics were compiled into a book titled Snapshots. The book contains a foreword by Tim Schafer and an introduction by Scott Campbell.

=== Tasha's Comic ===
Tasha Harris created a fifth comic, which was added in January 2008. The comic is a semi-autobiographical serial about the life of the author, and her boyfriend and two cats. Tasha's comic has been moved to her personal blog, "Tasha's Quest Log", as of September 2011, when she left Double Fine. The comic continued to be updated regularly until 2013. The current state of the comic is unknown.

Tasha's Comic was the third comic to be made into a free flash video game by Klint Honeychurch. Tasha's Game is a puzzle-platform game where Tasha has to rescue her family and co-workers from a mysterious entity, aided by her cat Snoopy who acts as a cursor allowing Tasha to place platforms in order to get to out of reach areas.

== Games developed ==
Year	Title	Publisher(s)	Platform(s)
2005	Psychonauts	Majesco; Double Fine Productions	Linux, macOS, Microsoft Windows, PlayStation 2, PlayStation 3, PlayStation 4, Xbox
2007	Epic Saga: Extreme Fighter	Double Fine Productions	Browser
2008	My Game About Me: Olympic Challenge	Double Fine Productions	Browser
2008	Tasha's Game	Double Fine Productions	Browser
2009	Host Master and the Conquest of Humor	Double Fine Productions	Browser
2009	Brütal Legend	Electronic Arts; Double Fine Productions	Linux, macOS, Microsoft Windows, PlayStation 3, Xbox 360
2010	Costume Quest	THQ; Double Fine Productions	Android, iOS, Linux, macOS, Microsoft Windows, PlayStation 3, Xbox 360
2011	Stacking	THQ; Double Fine Productions	Linux, macOS, Microsoft Windows, PlayStation 3, Xbox 360
2011	Iron Brigade	Microsoft Studios; Double Fine Productions	Microsoft Windows, Xbox 360
2011	Psychonauts Vault Viewer!	Double Fine Productions	iOS
2011	Sesame Street: Once Upon a Monster	Warner Bros. Interactive Entertainment	Xbox 360
2012	Double Fine Happy Action Theater	Microsoft Studios	Xbox 360
2012	Middle Manager of Justice	Double Fine Productions	Android, iOS
2012	Amnesia Fortnight 2012	Double Fine Productions	Microsoft Windows
2012	Kinect Party	Microsoft Studios	Xbox 360
2013	The Cave	Sega; Double Fine Productions	Android, iOS, Linux, macOS, Microsoft Windows, PlayStation 3, Wii U, Xbox 360
2013	Host Master Deux: Quest for Identity	Double Fine Productions	Browser
2013	Dropchord	Double Fine Productions	Android, iOS, macOS, Microsoft Windows
2013	Autonomous	Double Fine Productions	Microsoft Windows
2013	The Playroom: My Alien Buddy	Sony Computer Entertainment	PlayStation 4
2014	Broken Age	Double Fine Productions	Android, iOS, Linux, macOS, Microsoft Windows, Nintendo Switch, PlayStation 4, PlayStation Vita, Xbox One
2014	Amnesia Fortnight 2014	Double Fine Productions	Microsoft Windows
2014	Hack 'n' Slash	Double Fine Productions	Linux, macOS, Microsoft Windows
2014	Costume Quest 2	Midnight City	Linux, macOS, Microsoft Windows, PlayStation 3, PlayStation 4, Wii U, Xbox 360, Xbox One
2014	Spacebase DF-9	Double Fine Productions	Linux, macOS, Microsoft Windows
2015	Grim Fandango Remastered	Double Fine Productions	Android, iOS, Linux, macOS, Microsoft Windows, Nintendo Switch, PlayStation 4, PlayStation Vita, Xbox One
2015	Massive Chalice	Double Fine Productions	Linux, macOS, Microsoft Windows, Xbox One
2016	Day of the Tentacle Remastered	Double Fine Productions	iOS, Linux, macOS, Microsoft Windows, PlayStation 4, PlayStation Vita, Xbox One
2016	Headlander	Adult Swim Games	macOS, Microsoft Windows, PlayStation 4, Xbox One
2017	Psychonauts in the Rhombus of Ruin	Double Fine Productions	Microsoft Windows, PlayStation 4
2017	Amnesia Fortnight 2017	Double Fine Productions	Microsoft Windows
2017	Full Throttle Remastered	Double Fine Productions	iOS, Linux, macOS, Microsoft Windows, PlayStation 4, PlayStation Vita, Xbox One
2019	Rad	Bandai Namco Entertainment	Microsoft Windows, Nintendo Switch, PlayStation 4, Xbox One
2021	Psychonauts 2	Xbox Game Studios	Microsoft Windows, macOS, Linux, PlayStation 4, Xbox One, Xbox Series X/S
2025	Keeper	Xbox Game Studios	Microsoft Windows, Xbox Series X/S, PlayStation 5
2026	Kiln	Xbox Game Studios	Microsoft Windows, PlayStation 5, Xbox Series X/S
2026	Thank You Bus Driver	Double Fine Action Labs	Linux, Microsoft Windows

== Games published ==
Year	Title	Developer	Notes
2014	Escape Goat 2	MagicalTimeBean	
2014	Mountain	David OReilly	
2016	140	Jeppe Carlsen; Abstraction Games	Console versions only
2016	Thoth	Jeppe Carlsen	
2017	Everything	David OReilly	
2017	GNOG	KO OP	
2017	Gang Beasts	Boneloaf	Until May 2020
2019	KIDS	Playables	
2019	Knights and Bikes	Foam Sword	

== Awards ==
- Game Developers Conference — Best New Studio (2006)
- Official Xbox Magazine — Developer of the Year (2011)
