= Amnesia Fortnight 2014 =

- Developer: Double Fine Productions
- Publisher: Double Fine Productions
- Platform: Microsoft Windows
- Genre: Various
- Mode: Single-player

Amnesia Fortnight 2014 is a bundle of prototypes made during a two-week public prototyping session in 2014 by Double Fine Productions, which was held in conjunction with Humble Bundle in 2014. Everyone that paid a minimum of $1 had the opportunity to vote on 23 concept ideas from employees, and $7 to vote on one of four ideas from Adventure Time creator Pendleton Ward. After the completion of the voting period, Double Fine developed the top three concept ideas from employees and the top one concept from Pendleton voted ideas into game prototypes that became available to those that purchased the bundle after they were completed. 2 Player Productions filmed a documentary about the making of the prototypes, which was included on Blu-ray with purchase of the bundle if you donated $35. The documentary was also released on YouTube.

== Little Pink Best Buds ==
Little Pink Best Buds was the top voted idea from Pendleton Ward. In the game you have to uncover the mystery of the little pink dudes who all want to be your friend.

== Dear Leader ==
Dear Leader was led by Anna Kipnis. It is a narrative game, where you play a despotic ruler guiding the future of a post-revolution Republic.

== Mnemonic ==
Mnemonic was led by Derek Brand. It is a surreal, first-person noir adventure where you explore and rearrange memories in order to solve the murder of the woman you loved. Along the way you'll discover the impermanence of your remembered experiences and uncover secrets that are found only in the deepest realms of your consciousness.

== Steed ==
Steed was led by John Bernhelm. It is a game where you play a horse-for-hire and save a storybook land full of inept heroes.
