= Massive Chalice =

2015 video game

- Developer: Double Fine Productions
- Publisher: Double Fine Productions
- Director: Brad Muir
- Producer: Anthony Vaughn
- Designer: Brad Muir
- Programmer: Chad Dawson
- Writers: Max Folkman; Nick Folkman
- Composers: Brian Lee White; Brian Trifon
- Platforms: Linux; OS X; Microsoft Windows; Xbox One
- Release: June 1, 2015
- Genres: Real-time strategy, turn-based tactics
- Mode: Single-player

Massive Chalice is a turn-based tactics video game for Microsoft Windows, OS X, Linux and Xbox One by Double Fine Productions, which was funded through Kickstarter. The project leader of the game was Brad Muir, who previously led the development of Iron Brigade.

== Gameplay ==
The game switches between two modes: Strategy, in which the player makes long-term decisions and watches the years roll by, and Tactical, in which the player commands a team in turn-based battles against enemy forces. In Strategy mode, the player decides which tasks the Chalice will spend its small amount of spare energy on, while also dealing with problems that arise in the kingdom's population. While the player waits for projects to complete, the Cadence will regularly attack. Usually they attack multiple parts of the kingdom at once, but as the Chalice can only send a team of heroes to one location at a time, the player must decide which battle to fight to keep Cadence corruption from spreading too much.

As the player's character is unable to leave the palace, they must send heroes to fight the Cadence. Though these heroes are attuned to the Chalice, allowing them to survive contact with the Cadence, they are not immortal, and so a crucial part of Strategy mode is establishing bloodlines to breed future generations of heroes. The player can retire a hero to become regent of a noble house, and arrange a marriage to a hero from another house. Newborn heroes inherit some genetic traits from their parents, as well as personality. While same-sex couples cannot have children on their own, the Chalice can find babies in the kingdom who are attuned to it to be adopted by a noble house. Such children have their own genes but may still inherit personality traits from their adoptive parents or during training.

Heroes initially belong to one of three classes: Caberjacks, who wield battering-ram-like "cabers"; Hunters, who use giant crossbows to attack from a distance; and Alchemists, who use weapons resembling bladed lacrosse sticks to throw explosives or attack up close. Children inherit their parents' class; if the parents are different classes, one of six hybrid classes results (depending on which class is the regent parent). As heroes age, their statistics change; for example young heroes are faster but not as strong or smart as others, while very old heroes may be slower and weaker but much wiser. Heroes may also develop new personality traits from their experiences. If a distinguished hero dies on the battlefield, their personal weapon may become a Relic, a magical artifact that is passed down to younger members of their house.

== Plot ==
The player takes the role of an immortal ruler defending their country from invasion by a monstrous army known as the Cadence, whose touch is deadly to most humans and who leave magical corruption in their wake. They are aided by the titular Massive Chalice, a magical artifact whose two personalities advise the player. The Chalice can "cleanse the Cadence from this world", but needs 300 years to build up magical energy first.

The ruler holds out for 300 years, then fights off a huge enemy assault on the Chalice. After winning this battle, the Chalice admits that it cannot destroy the Cadence, only temporarily banish it, and that the process of doing so will both shatter the Chalice and kill the ruler. The Chalice assures the ruler that they've bought humanity more time, and hopes that it will be reforged before the next war. It's implied that the ruler has repeatedly gone through this, each time being resurrected with amnesia to fight the Cadence again.

== Development ==
In May 2013, Massive Chalice became the focus of Double Fine's second Kickstarter campaign, after Broken Age (formerly known as Double Fine Adventure) in 2012. The Double Fine team had learned from their mistakes on the first Kickstarter and opted to not show as much exclusive material to backers, as this created a rift between the backers and non-backers, as well as members of the press. The ability for same-sex marriage was added to the game after a number of backer requests. Brad Muir stated that backer input before development was one of the advantages of Kickstarter, since a feature such as this might not have been thought about until the game was almost completed, which would have made it harder to implement.

The game was originally expected to be released in September 2014 until it was delayed. The beta version of the game, a backer reward, was released on October 21, 2014. It was released on Steam Early Access on November 11, 2014. It was released for Microsoft Windows and Xbox One on June 1, 2015.

== Reception ==
Reception

Aggregate scores
Aggregator	Score
Metacritic	(PC) 73/100 (XONE) 72/100
OpenCritic	74/100; 43% Critics Recommend

Review scores
Publication	Score
Destructoid	6/10
Eurogamer	Recommended
Game Informer	8/10
GameSpot	6/10
GamesRadar+	3.5/5
Hardcore Gamer	4/5
IGN	6.7/10
PC Gamer (US)	75/100
Shacknews	8/10
USgamer	3.5/5

Massive Chalice received "mixed or average" reviews, according to review aggregator Metacritic.

Destructoid gave the game a six out of ten, calling nation management "simple and sterile" while writing, "Massive Chalice is both beautiful and approachable, somewhat rare qualities in the genre...By mid-game, what was novel and enticing becomes a slog". Game Informer called the title "rough around the edges, but hard to put down", criticizing its graphics, lack of attention to detail, user interface, and lackluster soundtrack, while praising its compelling gameplay. Eurogamer recommending the game, writing, " your enjoyment of Massive Chalice will depend largely on your willingness to meet its bigger ideas halfway. Most notably, you need to accept that it's more about making the best of a flawed hand than building a perfect system", noting that the experience was tough and called the title "a huge return to form" for Double Fine. IGN criticized the game's inability to give the player's decisions weight, saying, "As much as I enjoyed its aggressive brand of tactical combat and interesting enemy types, there are too many unpredictable variables outside your control, and too much happening to too many quickly aging, mortal characters for this tactical game to feel like decisions matter". PC Gamer criticized the poor AI and called the combat "well-executed but insubstantial", while noting that the bloodlines concept was by far Massive Chalice's greatest feature. GameSpot similarly praised the game's eugenics experiments, combat, lighthearted tone, while criticizing its art style and heroes for lacking personality and its inability to express important information to the player. Shacknews lamented the steep learning curve, lack of a cover system, and amount of factors left to chance, while lauding the bloodline system, tactical gameplay, and ending.

Despite the mixed reception, the Academy of Interactive Arts & Sciences nominated Massive Chalice for "Outstanding Achievement in Game Design" during the 19th Annual D.I.C.E. Awards.
