= Hack 'n' Slash =

2014 video game

- Developer: Double Fine Productions
- Publisher: Double Fine Productions
- Platforms: Microsoft Windows, OS X, Linux
- Release: WW: September 9, 2014
- Genre: Action-adventure
- Mode: Single-player

Hack 'n' Slash is a video game developed by Double Fine Productions. Prototyped during Double Fine's open Amnesia Fortnight 2012, Hack 'n' Slash is a top-down action-adventure game similar to The Legend of Zelda, though with in-game weapons and objects that allow the player to hack the game's world to achieve victory. The game was released to Steam's Early Access on May 6, 2014, for Microsoft Windows, OS X, and Linux computers. It left early access status and became a full release on September 9, 2014.

== Gameplay ==
The player controls the game's primary character, Alice (a reference to the common Alice and Bob placeholder names), armed with a "USB Sword" from a top-down view. While the player can use the sword and other weapons and tools to explore dungeons and fight enemies in a traditional manner, the sword itself can also interact in special ways with any game object, including enemies and obstacles, that has a USB port. At this point, the player can alter the basic parameters of the object to alter their behavior. Examples include adjusting the movement speed of an enemy, or setting a container's hit points to zero, causing it to collapse and release its contents. The player can also hack Alice's variables, such as her name or health points. For game objects that lack these USB ports, the player can use limited bombs that pause the execution of code from objects caught in the explosion, allowing them to temporarily hack the object's code, such as setting a flag that gives these objects a USB port to be hacked further.

The player can interact with any object in Hack 'n' Slash that possess a USB port (like the diamond-shaped pillars in the middle of the screen) to access the object's code and adjust its parameters to achieve various goals.

Another tool Alice has is the Third Eye Hat that opens a debugging interface, the same that Double Fine has used to create and test the game. Through this, the player can see elements of the code behind the objects, such as the contents of a container or invisible blocks. Although the player cannot hack the code while in debug mode, they can use this knowledge to achieve goals. In one case, with a series of invisible blocks floating very slowly over a chasm, the player is able to hack the game's internal clock that would, to the player, speed up the movement of the blocks. Completing quests earns the player in-game books that represent the actual code files used by the game, which the player can read to understand game mechanics and hack to alter how some process the game uses are done. For example, one book gives code for how bridges in the game are built, and the player can hack the book to cause the bridges to become longer as needed. All these changes are directly affecting the base code that the main adventure game runs with, and with improper changes, it is possible for the player to corrupt their saved game or break the mechanics of the adventure game, but the game's program will allow the player to go back to restored versions of the game's code to fix these.

== Development ==
Hack 'n' Slash was one of several ideas presented for voting for Double Fine's Amnesia Fortnight 2012 project, where users would be able to vote for the game concepts they felt they would want to play the most. Hack 'n' Slash was an idea presented by senior programmer Brandon Dillon, as a Zelda-like game with the ability to hack the game's features. The title received the most votes and was one of five other titles that Double Fine stated they would develop into full games. A full commercial version of the game was announced in December 2013, with expected released on Windows, Mac, and Linux in the first half of 2014. The announcement also revealed that part of the game's funding will come from the Indie Fund. The announcement also contained a single image that linked to a large compressed computer file that users have decoded to find out information about the game's world.

Dillon explained that the full version is less an adventure game and "really this puzzle game that teaches you about hacking", proving a learning curve to help players learn each of the tools provided in the game.

== Release ==
The game released as an early access title on Steam on May 6, 2014. The early access model is intended to facilitate fine-tuning the game's puzzles given its unusual mechanics, as well as allowing for integration of Steam Workshop features.

With the 1.0 release on September 9, 2014, the source code of the game was also released by Double Fine.

== Reception ==
Reception

Aggregate scores
Aggregator	Score
Metacritic	73/100
OpenCritic	69/100; 33% Critics Recommend

Review scores
Publication	Score
Eurogamer	Recommended
GameSpot	6/10
IGN	7.7/10
PC Gamer (US)	60/100

Hack 'N' Slash received "mixed or average" reviews, according to review aggregator Metacritic.

IGN gave the game a 7.7 out of 10, writing, "for all the very smart, ambitious, and never-before-tried stuff that Hack N'Slash does so well, it has a tendency to drop the ball on the easy stuff. Its maps are a nuisance to get around, with slippery controls...[it has] a tendency to get so wrapped up in being clever that the gameplay suffers for it...", and ultimately concluded that programmers would have a good time with the game. Eurogamer praised the game's graphics and the manner in which the game demanded the player's attention, calling the title "something of a perfect storm of indie game design", while criticizing its unfair obstacles, obtuse visual cues, and lack of polish. GameSpot and PC Gamer found the game's humor to be both unique and clever, and took issue with how "if you're not familiar with making games yourself, you may find each joke is lost on you whilst solving its associated puzzle, and is only funny in retrospect after its completion".
