= Dropchord =

2013 video game

- Developer: Double Fine Productions
- Publisher: Double Fine Productions
- Designers: Patrick Hackett; Drew Skillman
- Platforms: Microsoft Windows; OS X Ouya; Android iOS
- Release: Microsoft Windows, OS X July 22, 2013; Ouya; July 31, 2013 iOS, Android; August 1, 2013
- Genres: Music, puzzle
- Mode: Single-player

Dropchord is a motion controlled music-based puzzle video game for Windows and OS X using the Leap Motion controller. It was developed and published by Double Fine Productions. The game was one of the first games released on Leap Motion's Airspace app store, when it went live on July 22, 2013. It was also released for Ouya on July 31, and on Android and iOS on August 1 of the same year.

== Gameplay ==
Dropchord is a motion controlled music-based puzzle video game using the Leap Motion controller. Players use two fingers to create two glowing spheres. Once the spheres are locked into place on the level's circular track, players must navigate a beam of light around a series of obstacles that appear within the circle, which threaten to interrupt the beam. Certain sections require the player to paint large portions of the circle with the beam, by flicking their finger around the perimeter. There are also nodes to collect which will increase the score. At the end of each song, the player is given more health. If the health bar goes above maximum level, the player is awarded a star and a new layer of health will start filling up. You lose a star once all of the health in a layer has been depleted, and you lose the game when all health has been depleted. The game will automatically end when the final song ends.

A mode called Full Mix allows the player to play endlessly until their health runs out, but this mode does not give any health at the end of each song.

== Development ==
Dropchord was principally designed and developed by Double Fine's Patrick Hackett and Drew Skillman, who previously worked together on Kinect Party. It was originally titled Radius, but was retitled Dropchord before its premiere at PAX East 2013.

== Reception ==
Reception

Aggregate score
Aggregator	Score
Metacritic	71/100

Review scores
Publication	Score
Destructoid	6.5/10
Eurogamer	7/10
Game Informer	6.5/10
Gamezebo	3.5/5
Hyper	8/10
MacLife	3/5
Pocket Gamer	2.5/5
TouchArcade	4.5/5
National Post	6.5/10

The iOS version received "mixed or average reviews" according to the review aggregation website Metacritic.
