= Rad (video game) =

- Developer: Double Fine Productions
- Publisher: Bandai Namco Entertainment
- Director: Lee Petty
- Producers: Kevin Johnson; Malena Annable
- Designer: Gabe Cinqueplami
- Programmer: Chad Dawson
- Artist: Derek Brand
- Composer: David Earl
- Engine: Unreal Engine 4
- Platforms: Nintendo Switch; PlayStation 4; Windows; Xbox One
- Release: August 20, 2019
- Genre: Action
- Mode: Single-player

Rad is a roguelike action game developed by Double Fine and published by Bandai Namco Entertainment. It was released for Nintendo Switch, PlayStation 4, Windows, and Xbox One in August 2019 and for Amazon Luna in May 2021.

== Gameplay ==
Rad is a roguelike video game played from an isometric perspective. In the game, players control a teenager whose goal is to explore a procedurally-generated wasteland for effigies known as respirators, items that may restore the human civilizations after a devastating apocalypse. As the character explores the wasteland, their genes will mutate, granting players additional powers and perks. For each character, players can have unlimited passive bonuses and at most three active mutations. If the player character dies, they will be replaced by a new character.

== Development ==
Lee Petty, the director for Headlander, served as the game's director. The game was inspired by his teenage years and his love for 1980s aesthetics. In each run, abilities are gained randomly. According to Petty, this creates different combinations, which enables players to better explore the strengths and weaknesses of each mutation.

The game was officially announced in March 2019 by Bandai Namco Entertainment. The game was released for Nintendo Switch, PlayStation 4, Windows, and Xbox One on August 20, 2019, and for Amazon Luna on May 13, 2021.

== Reception ==
Reception

Aggregate score
Aggregator	Score
Metacritic	NS: 68/100; PC: 71/100; PS4: 74/100; XONE: 76/100

Review scores
Publication	Score
Destructoid	8/10
GameRevolution	7/10
GameSpot	6/10
IGN	7.6/10
Nintendo Life	6/10
Nintendo World Report	7/10
PC Gamer (US)	62/100
Push Square	8/10
Shacknews	8/10

Rad received "mixed or average reviews" for Switch, Windows, and PlayStation 4, and "generally positive reviews" for Xbox One according to review aggregator website Metacritic.

Destructoid praised the game's aesthetics, lore, and sense of humor, while criticizing the load times and noting its short length. IGN noted the game's difficulty, calling it "the good kind of tough" and similarly lamented the sluggish frame rate and load times. Nintendo Life lauded the game's combat and dozens of hours of content while taking issues with the RNG balance and the Switch port's handheld performance. PC Gamer called the game's encounter design "pitch perfect", criticizing the game's later levels for feeling "brutally unfair", writing, "Double Fine could crunch the numbers to make the early-game grind more effortless, but that would still leave a serviceable-at-best roguelike...Rad is painfully style-over-substance". Push Square praised the title's core concept, world, and varied gameplay while calling out the lack of multiplayer, uninspired enemy design, and loading times. GameSpot was critical of the game, finding the dialogue, mutant powers, and post-apocalyptic 80's universe redeemable, while criticizing its luck-based progression, cheap deaths, and its inability to teach its deeper mechanics.
