= Middle Manager of Justice =

2012 video game

- Developer: Double Fine Productions
- Publisher: Double Fine Productions
- Director: Kee Chi
- Platforms: iOS, Android
- Release: iOS: CAN: December 3, 2012; WW: December 13, 2012; Android: WW: August 14, 2013
- Genres: Simulation, role-playing
- Mode: Single-player

Middle Manager of Justice is a simulation video game for iOS and Android developed and published by Double Fine Productions. The iOS version was accidentally released in all territories on September 5, 2012, but was quickly pulled. That build was later branded beta, with the final release planned for later that year. The final release of the iOS version occurred on December 3, 2012 in Canada. The worldwide release of the iOS version occurred ten days later on December 13, 2012. The Android version was released on August 14, 2013.

== Gameplay ==
Middle Manager of Justice is a free-to-play simulation where the player controls a middle manager who is in charge of hiring, training, and housing a group of superheroes. There are several unique heroes available to purchase and train. The player must manage their health, morale and training, the latter of which increases their power and allows them to go out in the field and fight in role-playing style battles. Money earned by keeping districts of the city safe can be invested in buying better equipment for the heroes and upgrading the base's facilities.

== Development ==
Middle Manager of Justice began as part of Double Fine's "Amnesia Fortnight" brainstorming sessions where the senior staff came up with an idea and led a small team to create prototypes of those game ideas. The final game is part of a three-game deal with Dracogen.

== Reception ==
Reception

Aggregate score
Aggregator	Score
Metacritic	71/100

Review scores
Publication	Score
Game Informer	6/10
Pocket Gamer	4/5
TouchArcade	3.5/5
VentureBeat	40/100

Middle Manager of Justice received "mixed or average" reviews, according to review aggregator Metacritic.

Game Informer gave the game six out of ten, writing, "The big problem with Middle Manager is that it feels hands-off, but still demands your attention", while praising its charming presentation. Pocket Gamer reviewed the game more positively, describing the title as "...an enjoyably simple management sim that threads its theme and humour through every part of itself, Middle Manager of Justice is well worth your time." VentureBeat panned the game, writing, "playing feels like walking a treadmill on the slowest speed with the best option being to just buckle down and pay for gastrointestinal surgery". TouchArcade similarly wrote that while Middle Manager of Justice managed to mitigate the flaws in the freemium genre, it was unable to eliminate them.
