= Gang Beasts =

2017 multiplayer beat 'em up party game

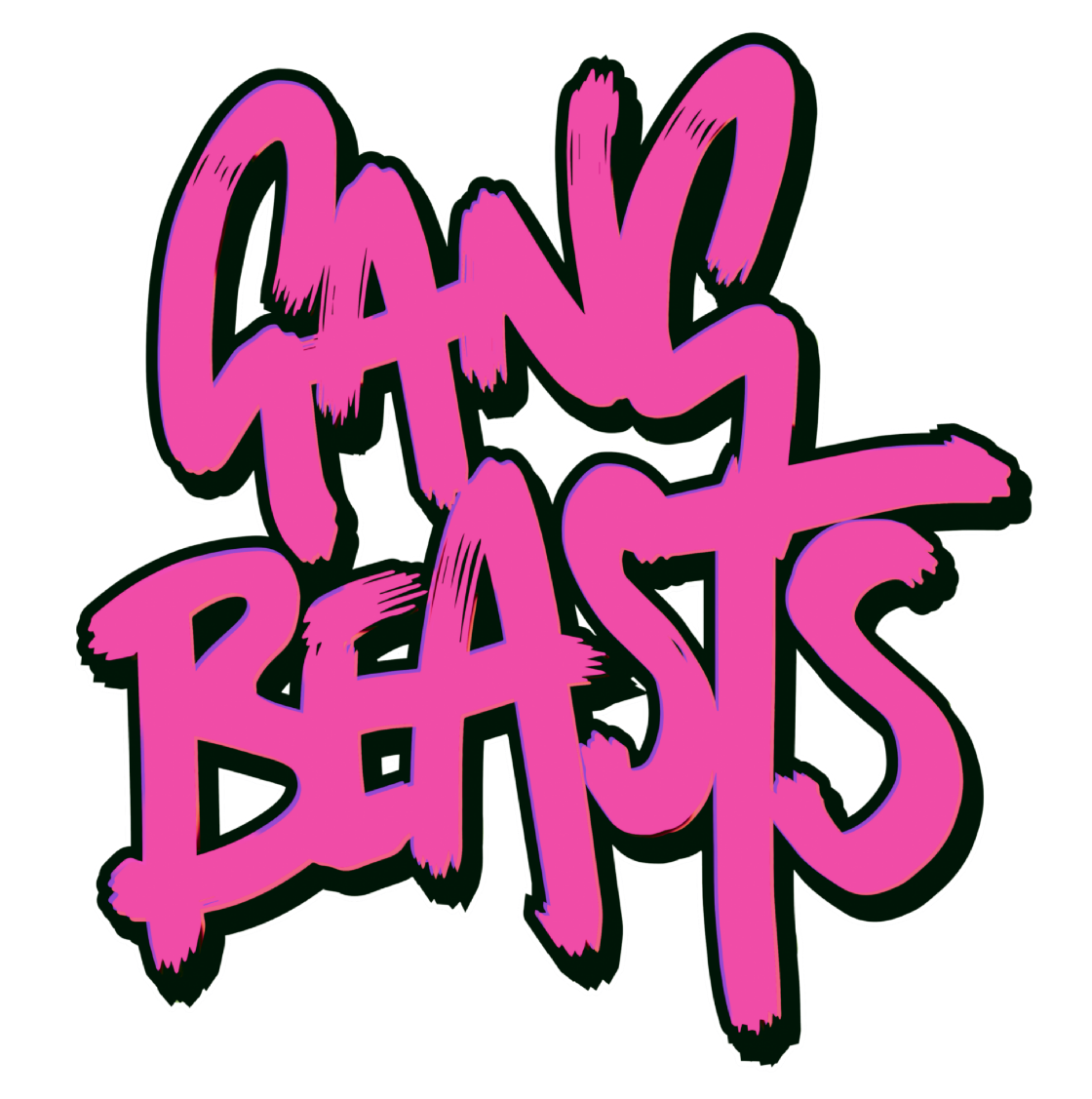
- Developer: Boneloaf
- Publishers: Double Fine Presents (2017–2020); Boneloaf (2020–present)
- Composers: Doseone; Bob Larder
- Engine: Unity
- Platforms: Linux; macOS; Windows; PlayStation 4; Xbox One; Nintendo Switch
- Release: Linux, macOS, Windows, PlayStation 4; 12 December 2017; Xbox One; 27 March 2019; Nintendo Switch; 12 October 2021
- Genres: Beat 'em up, party
- Modes: Single-player, multiplayer

Gang Beasts is a Beat 'em up party video game developed and published by English game developer Boneloaf Studios. The title was originally published by Double Fine Presents until May 2020 and was self-published afterwards, while it would later be published physically by Skybound Games. The game released for Windows, macOS, Linux, and PlayStation 4 on 12 December 2017, following an early access period for the PC platforms that began in August 2014. It was also released on the Xbox One on 27 March 2019. A version for Nintendo Switch was released on 13 October 2021.

== Gameplay ==
In the game, players fight each other as floppy, wiggly ragdolls in multiple melee fight sequences, and hazardous environments, set in the fictional metropolis of Beef City. Other game modes such as Waves, Gang, and Soccer are also available. At initial release, it contained eight multiplayer stages, and costume customization. The core gameplay involves using various physical attacks such as punching or kicking an opponent until they are knocked out, and then attempting to toss them over one of the stage hazards. Opponents that have been knocked down are not completely defenseless however, as they can fight back after they return to consciousness. There are 22 different playable stages that players can choose from.

== Reception ==
Reception

Aggregate score
| Aggregator | Score |
|---|---|
| Metacritic | PS4: 68/100; XONE: 67/100; NS: 68/100 |

Review scores
| Publication | Score |
|---|---|
| Destructoid | 6/10 |
| PC Gamer (US) | 64/100 |
| Hardcore Gamer | 4/5 |
| Shacknews | 6/10 |

In its freeware alpha state, as well as upon Steam Early Access release, the game was met with positive response from critics and fans. Comments include Keith Stuart of The Guardian calling it "probably one of the silliest beat-'em-ups ever made," Jessica Conditt from Engadget calling it "a jolly good time", and Steve Hansen from Destructoid highlighting how its weirdness plays out well.

Outside of early access, Gang Beasts received mixed reviews from critics on both the PC and PlayStation 4 versions of the game. On Metacritic, the game holds a score of 67/100 for the PlayStation 4 version based on 8 reviews, indicating "mixed or average reviews".

The game was nominated for "Excellence in Multiplayer" at the 2018 SXSW Gaming Awards, and for "Multiplayer" at the 14th British Academy Games Awards.
