= Host Master Deux: Quest for Identity =

2013 video game

- Logo
- Developer: Double Fine Productions
- Publisher: Double Fine Productions
- Producer: Greg Rice
- Designers: Benedikt Hummel; Marius Fietzek
- Programmer: Benedikt Hummel
- Artists: Marius Fietzek; Sabrina Winter
- Writer: Anna Kipnis
- Composer: Benedikt Hummel
- Platform: Browser
- Release: WW: March 26, 2013
- Genres: Adventure, platform
- Mode: Single-player

Host Master Deux: Quest for Identity is the sequel to Host Master and the Conquest of Humor. It is a free Flash adventure platformer, created Benedikt Hummel and Marius Fietzek, and starring game developer Tim Schafer. The game was published by Double Fine Productions, of which Schafer is president, and was originally playable on their website.

== Gameplay ==
Like the original game, both the plot and gameplay of Host Master Deux feature substantial amounts of metagaming. The game uses Double Fine's founder, Tim Schafer himself as the protagonist, placing him backstage at the Game Developers Choice Awards, which he hosted in 2013. Learning from his mistakes from the last game, Schafer is prepared for the event, but the bouncer will not let him in because he does not believe Tim is actually Tim Schafer. Tim must go back to his house to find a way to make himself look like he did before he shaved his beard, find a T-shirt to wear, and find a funny enough joke to impress the bouncer.

Like the original game, the game is controlled in a style for which the Double Fine team is known. This time the gameplay is presented as side scrolling platformer with a one item inventory, like The Cave, which was Double Fine's most recent adventure game at the time of the release of Host Master Deux.

== Response ==
Due to its association with Schafer, as well as the Game Developers Conference, Host Master Deux received substantially more media attention than is usual for an online Flash game. It was reported on by Adventure Gamers, The International House of Mojo, Rock, Paper, Shotgun, Destructoid, and Shacknews. PC Gamer called it "a funny, old-fashioned adventure game" and Kotaku praised its "hilarious puzzle-solving gameplay".
