= Keeper (video game) =

2025 video game

- Developer: Double Fine
- Publishers: Xbox Game Studios (Note: Windows and Xbox Series X/S versions); Double Fine (Note: PlayStation 5 version)
- Director: Lee Petty
- Producer: Naoko Takamoto
- Designer: Gabe Cinquepalmi
- Programmer: Kee Chi
- Artist: Lee Petty
- Composer: David Earl
- Engine: Unreal Engine 5
- Platforms: Windows; Xbox Series X/S; PlayStation 5
- Release: Windows, Xbox Series X/S; October 17, 2025; PlayStation 5; September 3, 2026
- Genre: Adventure
- Mode: Single-player

Keeper is an adventure game developed by Double Fine and published by Xbox Game Studios. It was released on Windows and Xbox Series X/S on October 17, 2025, and on PlayStation 5 on September 3, 2026.

== Gameplay ==
In Keeper, the player controls an animated lighthouse, with the ability to move and uses its lamp to light the way forward or to focus its light to interact with the environment, such as to remove obstacles that block forward progress. The lighthouse is accompanied by a bird-like creature named Twig; the lighthouse helps protect Twig, and in return, Twig can also perform interactions with the world to help the lighthouse to proceed forward, such as pulling vines off a target to be lit. Together, the two travel through a surreal, post-apocalyptic environment guided by a beacon from a nearby mountain, while avoiding a parasitic-like species known as the Wither that is attempting to consume life.

== Plot ==
In a post-apocalyptic desolate world, a parasite-like swarm of creatures called the Wither chase a flock of a bird-like species. One, named Twig, lands on a run-down lighthouse. A beacon from a distant mountain shines on the lighthouse, causing it to become animated with the ability to walk. The lighthouse helps to protect Twig with its light, while they move towards the mountain top. During their travel, they find shrines that speak on past automations, the Elders, that used their light to keep the Wither at bay, but they have long since disappeared. The lighthouse tumbles into an abyss, filled with the ruins of numerous other lighthouses that were attacked and destroyed by the Wither. The lighthouse reaches the surface and reunites with Twig. As they continue higher, Twig finds an abandoned egg of its species and watches over it. Near the surface, high winds cause the lighthouse to topple off the path, break apart as it falls, and land on a shoreline, while Twig flees with the egg.

Some time passes, and the lighthouse regains its consciousness, discovering it has been fused with an old fishing boat. The lighthouse is able to now navigate through the ocean, helping to protect the various creatures from the Wither. Twig soon finds the lighthouse, and shows off the youngling that it raised from the egg. Eventually, they discover the source for the infestation of Wither in the ocean, a large spider-like creature, and the lighthouse with help from those creatures it saved, are able to force the Wither to flee. The lighthouse gives chase along a river, but ends up crashing into the rocks, destroying everything but the lens. The lens is still able to roll and strike objects, and is able to fully defeat the Wither creature, breaking its strands and forcing it into an abyss. Twig and the youngling find the lens and carry it back to the surface, helping to reunite it with parts that had broken off. The lighthouse regains the ability to walk, and with the heavier boat body, is able to pass the high winds near the summit of the mountain. Once out of danger, they come across the rest of Twig's flock. The elder creature nods at the lighthouse as the flock, along with Twig and the youngling, fly off.

At the summit, the lighthouse finds the eye-like beacon that had awakened it, affected by some infection preventing it from fighting off the Wither. With its light, the lighthouse destroys the infection. It is then absorbed by the beacon, and across the landscape, the beacon shines its light, destroying all remaining elements of the Wither and allowing the land to flourish again.

== Development ==
Keeper was the idea of Lee Petty which bore out from the COVID-19 pandemic. During this period, Petty spent a good deal of time backpacking through the wilderness and caving areas in California, which led to thoughts about how the world would develop without the impact of humans. These thoughts led to the concept of a post-humanity game world to expand upon. In expanding the world, Petty was inspired by surreal artists Max Ernst and Salvador Dalí, and films such as The Dark Crystal and Nausicaä of the Valley of the Wind that explored strange, unusual places. Keeper was developed over a four year period.

Petty designed the game as a short adventure game, designed as a "palate cleanser". He opted to not include any written or spoken narration for the game, and instead have the player take in the world without having to worry about failure. Puzzles were designed to be part of the environment, with Petty expecting some players to wander into a puzzle and spending time to figure out its mechanics, compared to games where dialog would direct the player towards exactly what they must do. As part of the wordless nature of the game, Petty's team worked to develop the visual interactions between the lighthouse and Twig to convey emotions.

Keeper was developed in Unreal Engine 5. It employs the Lumen ray traced global illumination lighting system.

=== Music ===
The game's soundtrack was composed by David Earl.

=== Release ===
Keeper was released for Windows and Xbox Series X and Series S on October 17, 2025, with support for Xbox Play Anywhere across Xbox consoles and PC. It was also made available to Xbox Game Pass subscribers as a day-one title.

Following Double Fine regaining its independence from Xbox Game Studios in July 2026, along with the IP rights to its games, Keeper was shadow-dropped for the PlayStation 5 on September 3, 2026, during Sony's State of Play.

== Reception ==
Reception

Aggregate scores
Aggregator	Score
Metacritic	PC: 83/100 (28 reviews); XSXS: 78/100 (60 reviews)
OpenCritic	83% recommend (Note: Score based on 63 reviews)

Review scores
Publication	Score
Computer Games Magazine	9/10
Eurogamer	5/5
Game Informer	7.5/10
GameSpot	9/10
GamesRadar+	4.5/5
Hardcore Gamer	4/5
HobbyConsolas	71/100
IGN	9/10
The Guardian	3/5

Keeper received "generally favorable" reviews, according to review aggregator website Metacritic.

The game was nominated for "Statue of Liberty Award for Best World" at the 15th New York Game Awards and "Best Visual Art" at the 26th Game Developers Choice Awards.
