= Brad Muir =

American video game designer and programmer

- Occupations: Game designer, programmer

Brad Muir is an American computer game designer and programmer. He was a designer on Brütal Legend, and the project leader of Iron Brigade, Brazen, and Massive Chalice.

== Career ==
Brad Muir started his career as a programmer at Outrage Entertainment and as a gameplay programmer at Raven Software. He joined Double Fine Productions as a programmer on Psychonauts. He was then the game designer on Double Fine's next game, Brütal Legend, before becoming the project lead on Iron Brigade. His next role as project lead would be on Brazen, the 2011 prototype was included as a bonus as part of Double Fine's public two week prototype session, known as Amnesia Fortnight 2012. He then was the project leader on Massive Chalice, a tactical strategy game that was crowd funded through Kickstarter in 2013. In December 2015, he left Double Fine Productions and joined Valve.

== Recognition ==
Brütal Legend, for which Muir was the lead multiplayer designer, won the "Best Strategy/Simulation Game" award in the 13th Annual Interactive Achievement Awards from the Academy of Interactive Arts & Sciences.

== Credited works ==
=== Video games ===
- 2003 Alter Echo, programmer (Outrage Entertainment)
- 2004 X-Men Legends, gameplay programmer (Raven Software)
- 2005 Psychonauts, programmer (Double Fine)
- 2009 Brütal Legend, designer (Double Fine)
- 2011 Iron Brigade, project lead (Double Fine)
- 2012 Brazen, project lead (Double Fine)
- 2013 Dota 2, programmer (Valve)
- 2015 Massive Chalice, project lead (Double Fine)
- 2018 Artifact, programmer (Valve)
