= Kiln (video game) =

2026 video game

- Developer: Double Fine (Note: Additional work by Rare, and Virtuos)
- Publishers: Xbox Game Studios (2026); Double Fine (2026–present)
- Director: Derek Brand
- Producer: Farhad Badri
- Designer: Lauren Scott
- Programmer: Matt Enright
- Artists: Miyuki Richardson; Jared Mills
- Engine: Unreal Engine 5
- Platforms: PlayStation 5; Windows; Xbox Series X/S
- Release: April 23, 2026
- Genres: Party; Hero shooter
- Mode: Multiplayer

Kiln is a party brawler video game developed and published by Double Fine Productions. Featuring team-based brawling using a pottery theme, it was released for PlayStation 5, Windows, and Xbox Series X/S on April 23, 2026. Originally conceived during the studio's 2017 "Amnesia Fortnight" internal game jam, the project focuses on physics-based combat and character customization centered around the medium of pottery.

== Gameplay ==
Kiln is a multiplayer pottery party brawler. Players use a virtual pottery wheel to mold "Vessels" clay bodies inhabited by spirits. The game uses a two-button system to pull and squeeze raw clay into shapes such as plates, bottles, cups, or tall vases. These shapes are not purely cosmetic; they determine a character's physics and abilities. For example, a flat plate might act like a hockey puck that ricochets off enemies, while a tall vase can carry more water but is top-heavy and slow. There are 24 distinct shape and size combinations, each providing special attacks like launching popcorn from a cup or slamming down as a heavy cylinder hammer.

The primary multiplayer mode is "Quench," a 4v4 competition where teams must collect water and transport it to douse the fire in the opposing team's kiln. Combat is physics-driven, meaning characters chip, crack, and shatter based on the force and angle of impacts rather than pre-set health bars. Outside of matches, players congregate in a social hub called "The Wedge." Here, they can practice in a dojo, decorate their vessels with glazes, handles, and stickers, or trade customization items at a shop run by a dog named Slip.

== Development ==
Development of Kiln began during Double Fine's Amnesia Fortnight 2017 internal game jam. Project lead Derek Brand originally pitched the concept as a dark, supernatural brawler involving mountain spirits. After being selected as the "Team Choice" prototype during the jam, it underwent several years of quiet development. During this time, the art direction shifted from the moody tone of the prototype toward a more colorful and playful aesthetic.

The idea remained dormant for several years before being revived and fully developed into a standalone title. The announcement occurred at Xbox Developer Direct '26 on January 22, 2026, where Double Fine showcased the game, its mechanics, and early design philosophy. The project is led by developer Derek Brand, who helped guide the project from its prototype roots into the forthcoming multiplayer release. Post launch, Double Fine provided a content roadmap for 2026. In the weeks following launch, Double Fine plans on releasing a new map and cosmetic items. A feature update with 2 new maps and progression system additions are planned for the middle of 2026. On November 12, 2026, the "Reshaped" update added local co-op capabilities.

== Release and reception ==
Reception

Aggregate scores
Aggregator	Score
Metacritic	Xbox: 66/100
OpenCritic	40% recommend

Kiln was released on April 23, 2026, on PlayStation 5, Windows, and Xbox Series X/S. The game was made available on Xbox Game Pass Ultimate and PC Game Pass on day one. A closed playtest ran through April 9th-April 11th.
