= Ooblets =

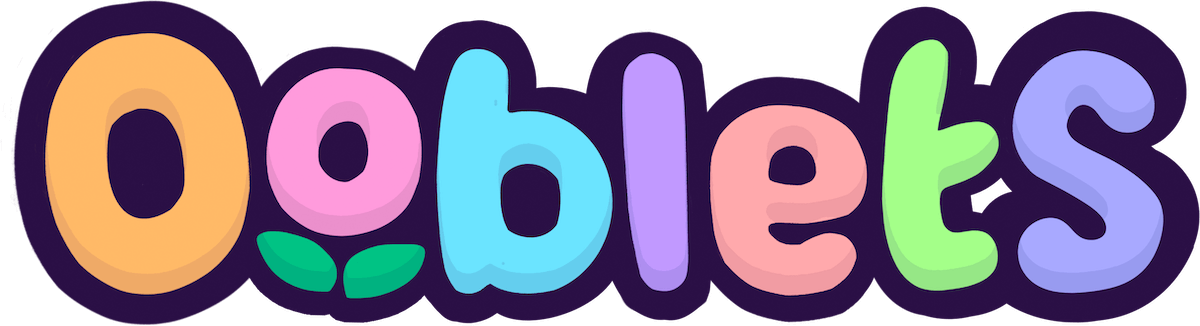
- Developer: Glumberland
- Publisher: Glumberland
- Designer: Ben Wasser
- Programmer: Rebecca Cordingley
- Artist: Rebecca Cordingley
- Engine: Unity
- Platforms: Nintendo Switch; Windows; Xbox One
- Release: September 1, 2022
- Genre: Life simulation
- Mode: Single-player

Ooblets is a life simulation video game by Glumberland. It was released via early access on July 15, 2020, for Windows and Xbox One. The game launched on September 1, 2022, for Nintendo Switch, Windows, and Xbox One.

== Gameplay ==
The game combines the farming elements of Story of Seasons with the creature collecting and battling mechanics of Pokémon.

The player arrives in Badgetown, a seaside town in Oob, where they are greeted by Mayor Tinstle and given a basic starting farm. In Badgetown there are several shops including Meed's Seeds, Kibbonbon, Manatweee and Cuddlecups Cafe. Players can purchase furniture and decor for their house, as well as seeds to grow on their farm. There are different quests that can be performed to unlock new shops and buildings, as well as improve the player's friendship level with the other residents. Players can also join one of four clubs: Frunbuns, Peaksnubs, Mossprouts and Mimpuns.

Ooblets, little creatures that the player befriends, can be grown from seed and used to perform tasks, like farming and machine operating, or dance-battle with other Ooblets. Unlike other life simulation games such as Stardew Valley, Ooblets replaces combat with a card-based dance-off system allowing new Ooblet seeds to be won and Ooblets to be levelled up.

=== Updates ===
Ooblets has received frequent updates to fix bugs and introduce new features and locations. On June 12, 2021, the Port Forward update was released bringing a new region and new Ooblets. As of July 2021, there are seven locations in the game: Badgetown, Wildlands, Mamoonia, Nullwhere, Port Forward, Pantsabear Hill, and Mount Tippy Top.

== Plot ==
The player moves to a land called Oob, where small creatures called Ooblets live. Arriving in Badgetown, they meet Mayor Tinstle, who provides them with a farm. They also learn that the town is threatened into being shut down by the Oob High Council (OHC) and resolves to save it. After powering up the Oobnet Tower in Badgetown, the player repairs a hot air balloon and travels to five other locations to reactivate the other Oobnet Towers there. They also engage in dance battles to defeat opponents and access the towers. Although the player succeeds, the OHC still plans to evict Badgetown. The player locates a secret passageway to the OHC's secret facility and discovers evidence that the Bunglebee Bun Corporation is controlling the OHC, who plan to demolish the town for their own gain. After confronting Polt, one of the corporation's workers, he runs away, leaving behind articles that show proof of the OHC and the Bunglebee Bun Corporation's conspiracy. After the player has the articles published, they return to town to find the OHC preparing to evict everyone, but newspapers that reveal the OHC and the Bunglebee Bun Corporation's guilt are showered around the town, forcing the OHC staff to leave in defeat. Tinstle thanks the player for saving the town as the main story ends.

== Development ==
Ooblets (previously known as Moblets) was developed by a two-person indie game development studio composed of artist/programmer Rebecca Cordingley and designer Ben Wasser, since 2016.

=== Storefront exclusivity controversy ===
The game was due to be published by Double Fine, but following that company's acquisition by Microsoft in June 2019, the Ooblets developers announced that they would instead self-publish the title. On August 1, 2019, it was announced that Ooblets would be an Epic Games Store exclusive. In the announcement by Glumberland's Ben Wasser, addressing criticisms of the Epic Games Store, he called those who he believed would pirate Epic Games Store exclusives "immature, toxic gamers", and that the situation was "nothing to get worked up about." The announcement led to backlash, including individuals sending messages to the developers voicing their displeasure. A fringe minority also circulated out-of-context or fake posts by Wasser, including a fabricated post of Wasser claiming that "gamers should be in gas chambers." Wasser later compiled his thoughts on the matter in a Medium post in August 2019, apologizing for acting in a hostile manner. Several fans who were shown in the screenshot conversations being spread clarified that they held no contempt towards Wasser, but noted that his responses on Discord were poorly worded.

On September 18, 2023, the developers announced they would be releasing the game on Steam on October 5 of that year.

== Reception ==
Reception

Aggregate score
Aggregator	Score
Metacritic	NS: 74/100; PC: 62/100

Review scores
Publication	Score
Destructoid	8.5/10
Edge	5/10
Game Informer	6.75/10
Hardcore Gamer	4/5
IGN	7/10
Nintendo Life	7/10
Nintendo World Report	5/10
TouchArcade	4/5

The game received mixed to positive reviews from critics. IGN rated the game 7/10, praising its style and farming sim mechanics, but criticizing its overall lack of depth. Nintendo Life also awarded the game a 7/10, complimenting its style, combat, and soundtrack.
