= Escape Goat =

2011 video game

- Developer: MagicalTimeBean
- Publisher: MagicalTimeBean
- Engine: Microsoft XNA
- Platforms: Xbox 360; Windows; OS X; Linux; Nintendo Switch
- Release: Xbox 360: WW: November 2, 2011; Windows: WW: June 14, 2012; Linux, OS X: WW: July 27, 2013; Nintendo Switch: WW: September 29, 2022
- Genre: Puzzle-platform
- Mode: Single-player

Escape Goat is a puzzle-platform game developed and published by independent developer MagicalTimeBean, for the Xbox 360, Microsoft Windows, OS X, Linux, and Nintendo Switch.

== Gameplay ==
The player guides a goat through various rooms, as they attempt to escape a prison. There are several objects that can assist or hinder the goat's progress, as well as a level editor that players can use to create their own puzzles.

== Reception ==
Rock Paper Shotgun reviewer John Walker recommended the game saying that it was short but enjoyable. GamesRadar+'s Lucas Sullivan also recommended the game: "With the ability to tackle levels at your own pace, and some masterfully-tuned difficulty, we can guarantee that you’ve never played a better goat-centric game."

== Legacy ==
A sequel to the game titled Escape Goat 2 was announced in January 2013 and released on March 24, 2014. The game has a new art style, new puzzles, and new magical hats which grant the player character various powers. Escape Goat 2 was published and promoted by Double Fine Productions' publishing label Double Fine Presents. A PlayStation 4 port was released in October 2014.
