= Headlander =

2016 video game

- Developer: Double Fine Productions
- Publisher: Adult Swim Games
- Director: Lee Petty
- Designer: Gabe Cinquepalmi
- Programmer: Kee Chi
- Artists: Christopher Lam; Geoff Soulis
- Writer: Lee Petty
- Composer: David Earl
- Platforms: Microsoft Windows, macOS, PlayStation 4, Xbox One
- Release: July 26, 2016
- Genre: Metroidvania
- Mode: Single-player

Headlander is a 2016 Metroidvania-style video game developed by Double Fine Productions and published by Adult Swim Games.

== Gameplay ==
Headlander takes place in a futuristic setting inspired by 1970s science fiction televisions shows and movies such as Logan's Run. In this future, humanity has opted to upload their consciousnesses to a world-encompassing cloud storage, forgoing their bodies but able to occupy the minds of robots as to carry out necessary tasks or otherwise enjoy corporeal pleasures. However, an artificial intelligence named Methuselah has taken control of the robots, trapping the human consciousnesses inside them, and enslaved them for some nefarious purpose. The last human is awoken from cryogenic storage to deal with Methuselah, but only their head has managed to survive the process and is suffering from amnesia.

Headlander plays out as a 2.5D Metroidvania-style game. The character's head, equipped in a special helmet that allows the head to fly around, can also use its tractor beam to take the heads off the robots and use their bodies as needed. Robots have specialized functions, so the player may be required to find the right type of robots and maneuver it through the game world to complete a task, such as using a security robot to open a door. The helmet includes a laser system that can be used to damage robots and protect itself, and can gain additional powerups that grant access to other areas of the game world. At times, the player is limited to using only the helmet and needs to fight through sections that are similar to bullet hell games. At other times, the player can also opt to use a robot body to engage in combat, which can include both ranged and melee fights, depending on what type of robot they choose.

== Development ==
Headlander was announced at the 2015 PAX Prime expo. Double Fine Productions is handling development duties for the game, with Lee Petty overseeing its team, while Adult Swim Games will distribute the title. The game was released on July 26, 2016 for Microsoft Windows and PlayStation 4. On November 17, 2016, Headlander was released for Xbox One.

== Reception ==
Reception

Aggregate scores
Aggregator	Score
Metacritic	(PS4) 77/100 (PC) 74/100
OpenCritic	76/100; 64% Critics Recommend

Review scores
Publication	Score
Destructoid	4.5/10
Game Informer	7.5/10
GameSpot	8/10
GamesRadar+	4/5
Hardcore Gamer	4.5/5
IGN	8.2/10
PC Gamer (US)	80/100
Push Square	9/10
Shacknews	6/10
VideoGamer.com	7/10

Headlander received "generally favorable" reviews for PlayStation 4 and "mixed or average" reviews for PC according to aggregate review website Metacritic.

IGN gave the game an 8.2 out of 10, writing, "Headlander is an unexpectedly great take on Metroidviania-style action. Some of the objective design renders its flashier, body-endangering powers moot, but the quick and complex moment-to-moment gameplay carries it splendidly. It's difficult but fair, and fast-paced but satisfying through to the end." PC Gamer called Headlander's tone "inconsistent" and noted that the title played things safe, sticking to tropes in its genre, but heavily praised its aesthetics, writing, "its gorgeously kitschy world of thrumming synths and dazzling colour makes for an unforgettable adventure". Destructoid reviewed the game negatively, lamenting the lack of depth in the aesthetics, combat, exploration, themes, and plot, writing, "Headlander knows what it is but doesn't know what it wants to be." Game Informer wrote, "Headlander doesn't forge a bold new path, but it's a lot of fun to live in its strange world for a while. Its various elements are well trod – '70s aesthetic, Metroid-style exploration, big questions about the nature of identity and consciousness – but they've been arranged in a fascinating way that feels fresh." GameSpot similarly appreciated the game's visuals, aesthetics, characters, score, and movement while criticizing the repetitive dialogue, minor technical issues, bosses, and combat. GamesRadar+ praised the title's take on the Metroidvania formula and its pacing while taking issue with the backtracking and finicky combat. Push Square called the game "one of the best games that Double Fine has ever produced", writing, "Everything about it is so finely tuned, from its gunplay to its platforming to its puzzles, and it doesn't just stay true to classic Metroidvanias – it also builds upon the foundations that they laid. The story is well told, the characters are entertaining, the environments are fleshed out, and the humour is as brilliant as always."
