= Scott Campbell (artist) =

American artist and production designer

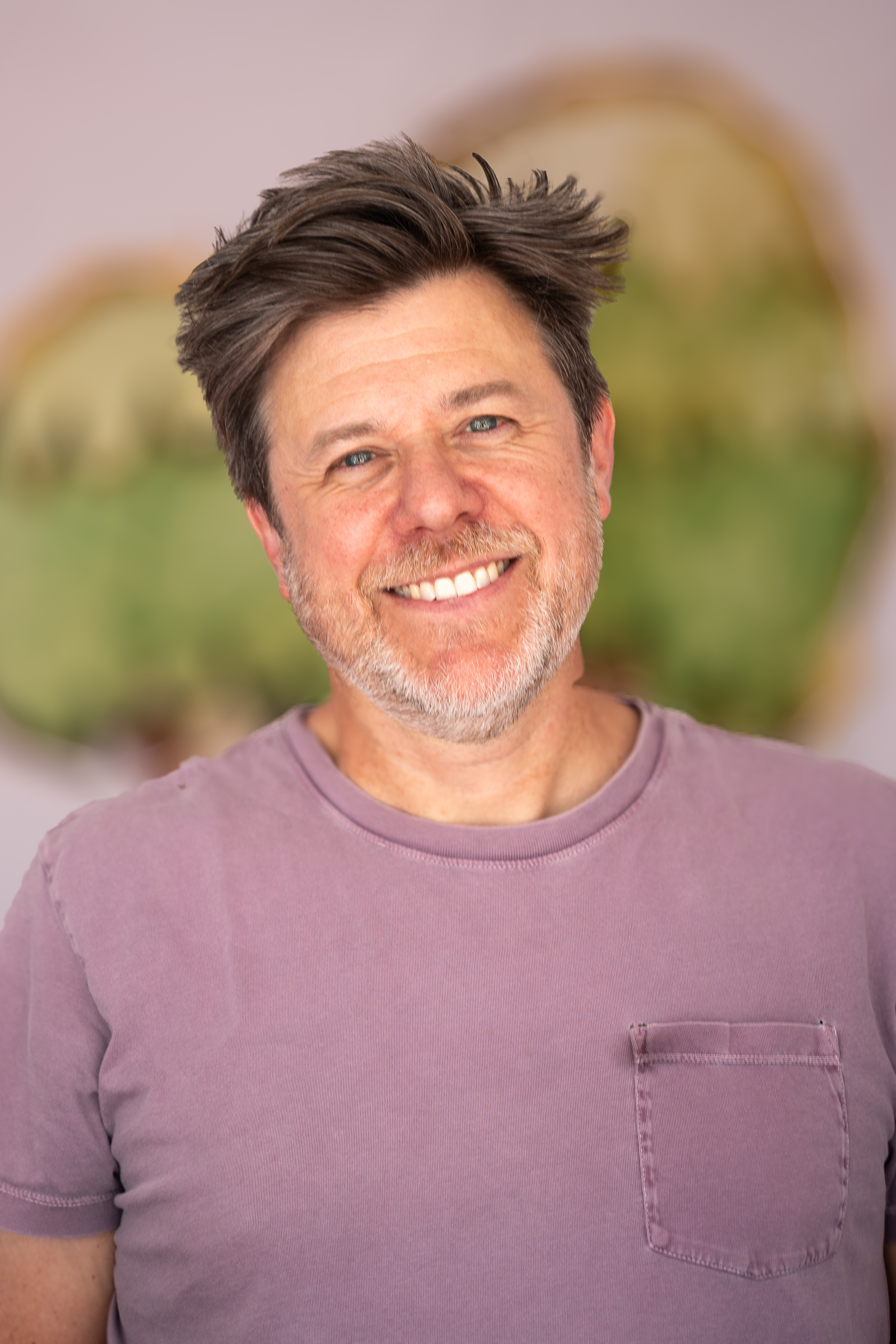
- Campbell at the 2026 Los Angeles Times Festival of Books
- Born: December 28, 1973 (age 52)
- Occupations: Production designer Concept artist Art director

Scott Campbell (born December 28, 1973), known professionally as Scott C., is an American artist and production designer, known for his work for LucasArts and Double Fine Productions.

== Early life ==
Born and raised in San Jose, California, Scott studied illustration at the Academy of Art University in San Francisco and graduated with a BFA in Illustration focusing on comic and children's book illustration in 1992.

== Career ==
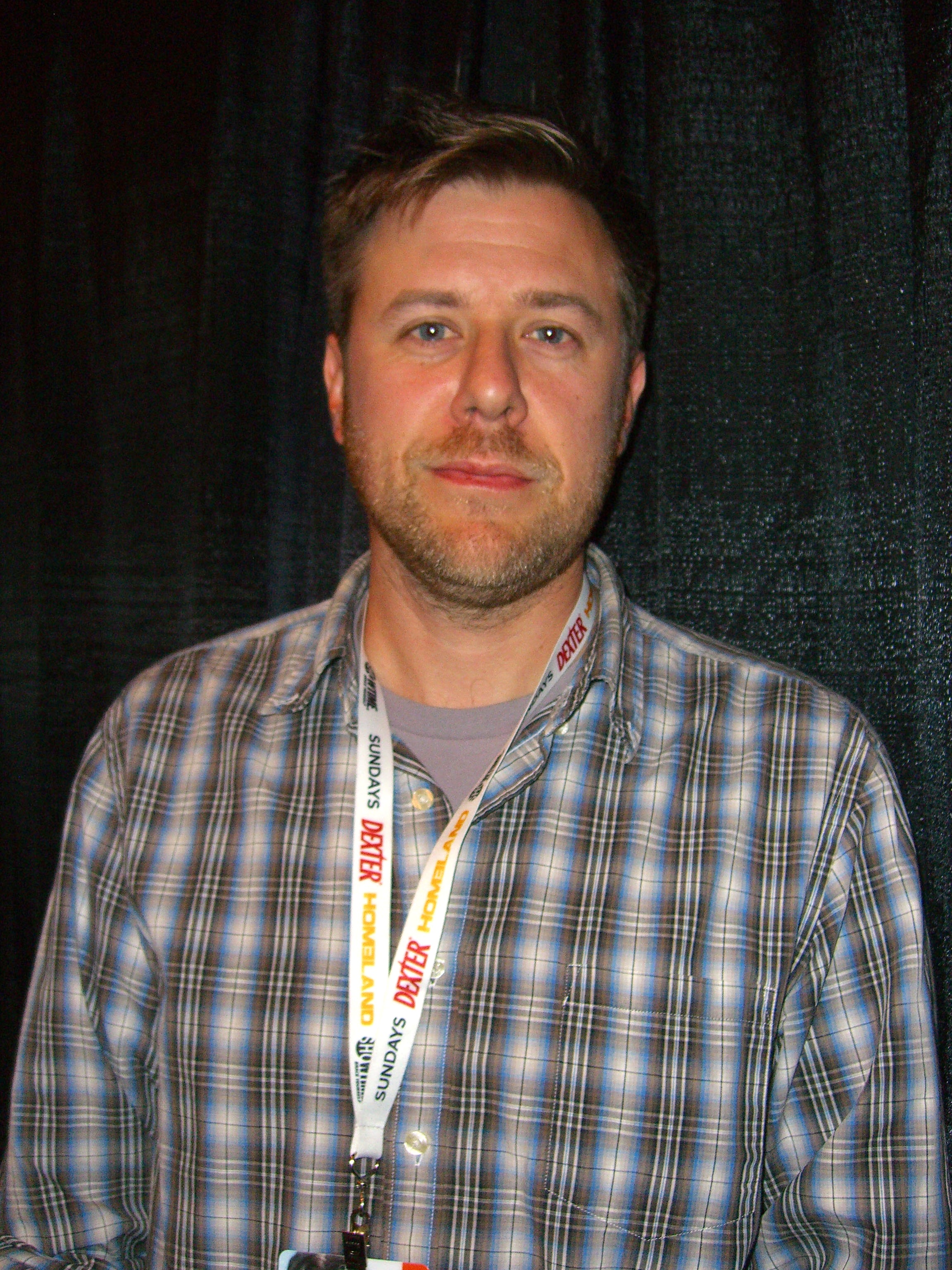
Campbell at the 2012 New York Comic Con.

After graduation, Campbell began at LucasArts as concept artist on children's Star Wars games. In 2000, he left to join Tim Schafer at Double Fine Productions as Art Director on such games as 2005's Psychonauts and 2009's Brütal Legend. In addition to his career in games, he has been involved in comics (including being featured in the comic anthology Flight) and created paintings that have appeared in galleries around the world as well the alternative DVD cover for The King of Kong: A Fistful of Quarters.

== Bibliography ==
- Splendid Life: The Art of Scott C.. Insight Editions, 2017. ISBN 1683831012
- Hug Machine. Atheneum Books for Young Readers, 2014. ISBN 1442459352
- "Amazing Everything!" Insight Editions, 2011. ISBN 1-60887-047-2
- "Zombie in Love". illustrated, Atheneum Books for Young Readers, 2011. ISBN 1-4424-0270-9
- Flight (comics) #8, contributed the story "Igloo Head and Tree Head in Accomplishments." Ballantine Books, 2011 ISBN 0-345-51738-5
- Beasts!: Book One, Fantagraphics, 2008. ISBN 1-56097-950-X
- Double Fine Action Comics. Nerdcore, 2008. ISBN 0-9800924-2-6
- Flight #5. Contributed the story "Igloo Head and Tree Head in Disguise." Ballantine Books, 2007. ISBN 0-345-50589-1
- Flight #4, contributed the story "Igloo Head and Tree Head." Ballantine Books, 2006. ISBN 0-345-49040-1
- Project Superior, contributed the story "Pretty OK Team." Adhouse Books, 2005. ISBN 0-9721794-8-8
- Hickee. Alternative Comics, 2003. ISBN 1-891867-42-3

== Video games ==
- Psychonauts (2005) (art director)
- Brütal Legend (2009) (art director)
- Once Upon a Monster (2011) (Concept art)
- Broken Age (2014) (Concept art)
- Psychonauts 2 (2021) (Concept art)

== Awards ==
- Winner: 2007 Society of Illustrators Silver Medal in the Sequential Art (for the story "Igloo Head and Tree Head" from the fourth edition of Flight)
- Nominated 2007 Ignatz Award for Promising New Talent
