= Iron Brigade (video game) =

2011 video game

- Iron Brigade box art
- Developer: Double Fine Productions
- Publishers: Microsoft Studios (until 2015); Double Fine Productions (from 2015)
- Director: Brad Muir
- Producer: Matthew Hansen
- Programmer: Christopher Jurney
- Artist: Geoff Soulis
- Writer: Tim Schafer
- Composer: Peter McConnell
- Platforms: Microsoft Windows, Xbox 360
- Release: Xbox 360: NA: June 22, 2011; EU: November 30, 2011; Microsoft Windows: WW: August 13, 2012
- Genres: Tower defense, third-person shooter
- Modes: Single-player, multiplayer

Iron Brigade, formerly titled Trenched, is a 2011 video game, developed by Double Fine Productions, published by Microsoft Studios as a downloadable Xbox Live Arcade title on the Xbox 360, and released for Microsoft Windows in 2012. Iron Brigade is a hybrid tower defense and third-person shooter game, set after World War I in an alternate reality, where the player controls units from the Mobile Trench Brigade to fight off robotic species called the Monovision. The player controls giant mecha-style robots with weapon and armor customization through a variety of missions set across the world. The game was released on the Xbox Live service on June 22, 2011, with a delayed release in certain European areas due to trademark issues with the title, with its release scheduled for November 30, 2011 but was ultimately released on December 1, 2011 under the alternate name Iron Brigade. The name of the title was updated worldwide to Iron Brigade alongside the European release.

== Gameplay ==
The player controls their selected character in a "mobile trench", defending their base against the television-based "Monovision" creatures.

Iron Brigade is considered to be a hybrid game, mixing the gameplay of tower defense games with third-person shooters and incorporating role-playing video game elements. Players control a "trench", a giant war machine that can move about the battlefield as needed. The player's goal is to protect their ship base, the USS McKinley, from increasingly difficult waves of Monovisions. Though a player's trench may be disabled by enemy attacks, the player can spend time to repair the machine and continue on; the game is only lost when the base is overrun by the Monovisions (although there are exceptions with some levels, where the objective is to destroy a given object rather than defend one). During the attacks, the player has the ability to ground its trench at a fixed spot, or move about the field to fire on foes.

Before combat, the player customizes their equipment on their trench at the base. The choice of the hull for the trench will affect the number and types of weapons that can be loaded onto it. The player can also select which Emplacements they will carry, eventually targeting a location on the battlefield to place them. Emplacements provide both offensive capabilities well as defensive ones such as repulsing enemies back. As the player defeats the Monovisions, they will drop scrap pieces that can be used to repair, upgrade, and call in more Emplacements. After winning a battle, the player gains rewards including new weapons and parts for their trench, and decorative hats similar to Team Fortress 2. The player will gain experience points towards both personal goals and "Regiment" goals, reflecting progress among the last several Xbox Live players that the player cooperated with. In a manner similar to Call of Duty 4: Modern Warfare, new weapons and other customization options become available as the player gains level this way. Iron Brigade allows for up to four player co-operative gameplay.

== Plot ==
Set in an alternate history shortly after the end of World War I, a strange radio communication known as "the Broadcast" is sent across the world and caused many people who listened to it to die. Two war veterans, Frank Woodruff and Vladimir Farnsworth, survive the attack and gain super-intelligence and a knowledge of advanced technology. Frank, having previously lost his legs in the war, uses his knowledge to design and build mechanical walking platforms called "mobile trenches," giving other disabled soldiers the ability to move again. Vladimir on the other hand creates the Monovision, allowing people to experience the world from the comfort and isolation of their homes. Vladimir is driven insane by his own invention; bent on global conquest, he constructs Monovision-based robotic creatures, derogatorily called "Tubes", designed to spread the broadcast and lays Monovision cables across the world. As Vladimir's forces spread, Frank's "Mobile Trench Brigade" leads the counterattack. After the "Mobile Trench Brigade" has defeated Vladimir's forces, it's revealed that the Monovision's influence on Vladimir has rendered his body like that of a newborn baby while maintaining his head and intellect. While it remains unclear where the Broadcast came from or when it will strike again, Frank remarks that the Mobile Trench Brigade will be there to fight the menace should it ever rise up again.

== Development ==
Iron Brigade is the fourth game (including Costume Quest, Stacking, and Sesame Street: Once Upon a Monster) to result from a period called "Amnesia Fortnight" during the 2009-2010 period where Double Fine's last disc-based release, Brütal Legend, had no publisher. It is also the first game directed by designer Brad Muir. To bolster morale, Tim Schafer divided the team into four groups, challenging to develop a game prototype within two weeks for review by the rest of the company. Each of the four ideas were found to be successful bases for future games. When Brutal Legend was completed and Double Fine was told to discontinue work on a sequel, Schafer turned to these four games and sought publishers for them as smaller, downloadable titles.

The game's art style is inspired by men's magazines of the 1940s and '50s, which illustrated "the sense of adventure, bravery, camaraderie, drinking, and good old-fashioned face-punching violence," according to project lead Brad Muir. With their development assisted by Microsoft Studios, Muir and his art team were able to tap into Microsoft's own art department to create some of these images.

Announced at the 2011 Game Developers Conference by Tim Schafer. The game was originally announced and released in North America as Trenched. Though scheduled to be released near the same time as the North American version, the European versions of the game were delayed indefinitely. It was discovered that an earlier registered trademark on a war-themed Portuguese board game "Trench," owned by Rui Alípio Monteiro, conflicted with Trenched's name. Rui Alípio Monteiro has stated they wish to make "Trench" into an electronic game, further complicating Trenched's release. A similar challenge occurred in the United States, where Rui Alípio Monteiro had also previously filed for the "Trench" trademark. According to Muir, Microsoft worked to resolve the trademark issue to assure release of the game in Europe. Ultimately, at the Gamescom 2011 conference, Microsoft announced that Trenched would be retitled as Iron Brigade in Europe, with a release set for November 2011. It was later announced that the name of the game would be updated through a patch in late 2011 to bring the other releases of the game to meet the new Iron Brigade name, along with the addition of new game modes, weapons, and extras with the game. The renamed version and European release were originally scheduled for September 2011, but Muir explained that much of the changes had to proceed through various divisions of the Xbox Live Arcade game certification process, delaying the updates until November.

Along with the rename, the game gained a new game mode, weapons, and extras for no additional cost, as a means of a make-off offering for the delay and rename. The release of Iron Brigade featured a "Survival" mode where the players must defend as long as possible against 100 waves of enemies. The first downloadable content for the game, Rise of the Martian Bear, was released on February 1, 2012, and introduces a new campaign, more items and survival mode maps.

A Microsoft Windows version was announced for release on August 13, 2012; this version includes the Martian Bear DLC for free. In May 2015 Double Fine was able to fully acquire the rights to Iron Brigade from Microsoft, allowing them to remove Games for Windows Live from the Windows version and replace it with Steamworks. Ironically Microsoft would regain the publishing rights to this game by acquiring Double Fine Productions in 2019.

=== Rise of the Martian Bear ===
On February 1, 2012, the Rise of the Martian Bear downloadable content was released. It picks up the story right after the ending of the original campaign. The player finds themselves once again having to confront Vladimir Farnsworth, as he has survived by transferring his consciousness into his pet bear, who bears a matching beard and moustache. He has a monovision fixed atop his head that displays the original visage of Farnsworth.

The premise is that Vlad has spread the Broadcast into space, so the player needs to launch their mobile base of operations—the USS McKinley—into space to stop him. Rise of the Martian Bear contains five new campaign missions (4 defense missions and 1 boss mission) and two new survival missions, three new enemies, 80+ new pieces of loot, and an increased level cap.

== Reception ==
Reception

Aggregate score
Aggregator	Score
Metacritic	82/100

Review scores
Publication	Score
1Up.com	B
Destructoid	8.5/10
GamePro	4.5/5
GameSpot	8/10
GameTrailers	8.4
IGN	9/10
Joystiq	4.5/5 stars
Official Xbox Magazine (US)	9/10

The title has received mostly positive reviews, with a Metacritic score of 82. Joystiq gave it a very favourable review by scoring it a 4.5/5 rating, calling it a well polished game with much personality. The reviewer noted that it had become one of his favourite multiplayer experiences on Xbox Live and is his favourite tower defence game to date. IGN gave the title a 9 out of 10 rating. Anthony Gallegos called it the best downloadable title he's played all year long, stating that its combination of skillful writing, fun shooting, and tactical tower defense makes for hours of replayable gameplay. The Official Xbox Magazine gave it a 9 out of 10 rating, praising explosions, balance of action and strategy, and replayability. Destructoid gave it an 8.5 out of 10 rating, calling it a hell of a fun game that has just a few minor blemishes.

GameSpot gave it an 8 out of 10 rating, praising the combination of tower defense and action gameplay, varied missions with replay value, fun solo and co-op modes, and customization but criticizing the chore of collecting scrap. 1up gave it a B rating, criticizing that the game doesn't include a local co-op option but stating that if you have a friend to play with, it can be a blast. GamePro gave the title a rating of 4.5 out of 5 stars, praising its addictive, loot-rewarding gameplay, strategic and easy-to-jump-into multiplayer, and fun customization options but criticizing the occasionally wonky enemy indicator and the missing option of a strategic view of the entire map.

During the 15th Annual Interactive Achievement Awards, the Academy of Interactive Arts & Sciences nominated Iron Brigade for "Strategy/Simulation Game of the Year".
