= Stacking (video game) =

2011 video game

- Developer: Double Fine Productions
- Publishers: Double Fine Productions; THQ (consoles until 2013)
- Director: Lee Petty
- Producer: Gabe Miller
- Designer: Lee Petty
- Programmer: Chad Dawson
- Artist: Freddie Lee
- Writer: Lee Petty
- Composer: Peter McConnell
- Platforms: PlayStation 3, Xbox 360, Windows, OS X, Linux
- Release: February 8, 2011: PS3; NA: February 8, 2011; EU: February 9, 2011; Xbox 360; WW: February 9, 2011; Windows; WW: March 6, 2012; OS X, Linux; WW: May 7, 2013
- Genres: Puzzle, adventure
- Mode: Single-player

Stacking is an adventure puzzle video game developed by Double Fine Productions and published by THQ in February 2011 for the Xbox 360 and PlayStation 3 video game consoles. A Windows version was released in March 2012, and OS X and Linux versions were released in May 2013. Like Double Fine's previous Costume Quest, it is a smaller title created during the development period of Brütal Legend.

The game is based on the Russian stacking matryoshka dolls, an idea coined by Double Fine's art director, Lee Petty, who saw the dolls as a means to replace the standard player interface used in graphical adventure games. The player controls the smallest doll, Charlie Blackmore, who has the ability to stack and unstack into larger dolls and use their abilities to solve puzzles to allow Charlie to free his older siblings and put an end to child labor enforced by the antagonist, the Baron. Puzzles within the game have multiple solutions, and include additional puzzles and challenges that allow the player to explore the game's world outside of the main story.

Stacking was well received by critics and praised for its alluring appearance, humorous story, and accessible gameplay for casual players.

== Gameplay ==
The world of animated matryoshka dolls in Stacking

The player controls Charlie Blackmore, the smallest doll in the world, who is attempting to reunite his family that is being forced to work for an evil industrialist named The Baron. Charlie is able to jump inside dolls that are one size larger than he and control them, as long as the larger doll is facing away from him. If the player already controls a stack of dolls, that stack can jump into a one-size-larger doll as well. The player can also unstack the dolls at any time in order to enter dolls smaller than his current stack. Certain unique dolls, outside of Charlie, have their own special abilities—such as the ability to unlock doors, float to higher locations, or lure other dolls around, which can be used by the outermost doll. Thus, the player must stack and unstack the set of dolls possessed by Charlie to solve puzzles throughout the game. Later puzzles may require the use of multiple dolls to combine their skills.

The various challenges for each mission contain multiple solutions, with rewards offered for finding all of them. For example; in a challenge where the player must clear out a lounge of rich people, players can either sneak in a poorly dressed man into the party, or have another character flatulate into an air vent to clear everyone out. There are also rewards for completing side missions, discovering unique dolls, finding and stacking a matching set of dolls and performing "Hi-jinks" with certain dolls. Along with achievements and trophies, rewards can be viewed via dioramas constructed by Charlie's hobo friend, Levi.

== Plot ==
Set in a fictional version of the industrial age, the story begins with William Blackmore, a professional chimney sweep, leaving his family to take a job under a powerful industrialist, the Baron. A few months later, with William having failed to return and the family deep in debt, the four Blackmore children (Albert, Agatha, Abigail, and Archibald) are forced into apprenticeships by the Baron's agents, leaving the youngest, Charlie, alone with his mother Agnes. A few weeks later, a pigeon arrives with a letter from Albert, who reveals that the Baron has split up him and his siblings, forcing them to work as slaves. Charlie subsequently sets out to rescue them, recruiting a friendly hobo named Levi to help him set up a hideout in an abandoned section of the Royal Train Station, where a strike has forced the station's management to use Albert and other children as coal shovelers.

Charlie sets up a meeting between the strike leader and representatives from the Train Guild, breaking the strike and freeing Albert. Another letter, this time from Agatha, then leads him to the Baron's private cruise ship, the Commodore Perry, which is currently embarked on a never-ending voyage. By turning a small group of wealthy and influential passengers aboard the Perry against the ship's captain, Charlie forces him to return to shore, allowing Agatha to return home. A third letter leads Charlie to slip aboard a massive zeppelin hosting an international summit on whether or not to ban the use of child labor, which the Baron has rigged by abducting the ambassadors opposed to him. Charlie frees them and they manage to pass a formal ban, but the Baron subsequently orders his men to overload the zeppelin, intending to kill the delegates in a staged "accident". With the help of Abigail, who he rescued earlier, Charlie and the ambassadors fix the damage and save the zeppelin before it crashes.

In an attempt to win back the public's trust, the Baron announces plans to send all of his former child laborers on an all-expenses paid vacation using his newly-constructed private train. However, the whole thing turns out to be a trap; the Baron and his stockholders intend to transport the children to an offshore factory, outside of international jurisdiction. Furthermore, the entire Blackmore family has been taken hostage, watched over by the Baron's henchmen, the Generals. Charlie manages to subdue them individually and free his family, including his father. Unfortunately, they are unable to stop the train before it reaches its destination, and the Baron reveals his true plan: to turn the factory into an artificial island and sell the children as a cheap labor force.

Together with his family and friends, Charlie strips away the Baron's layers until they are both the same size. The Baron summons guards to assist him, but Levi and his hobo cousins show up in a makeshift helicopter and defeat them. Charlie and the Baron then confront each other in a final duel of rock-paper-scissors, ending with the Baron being thrown into a pit filled with captive orphans who tear him into pieces, leaving behind only his monocle and top hat. Upon returning home, William takes a better-paying job, finally freeing the Blackmore family from poverty.

== Development ==
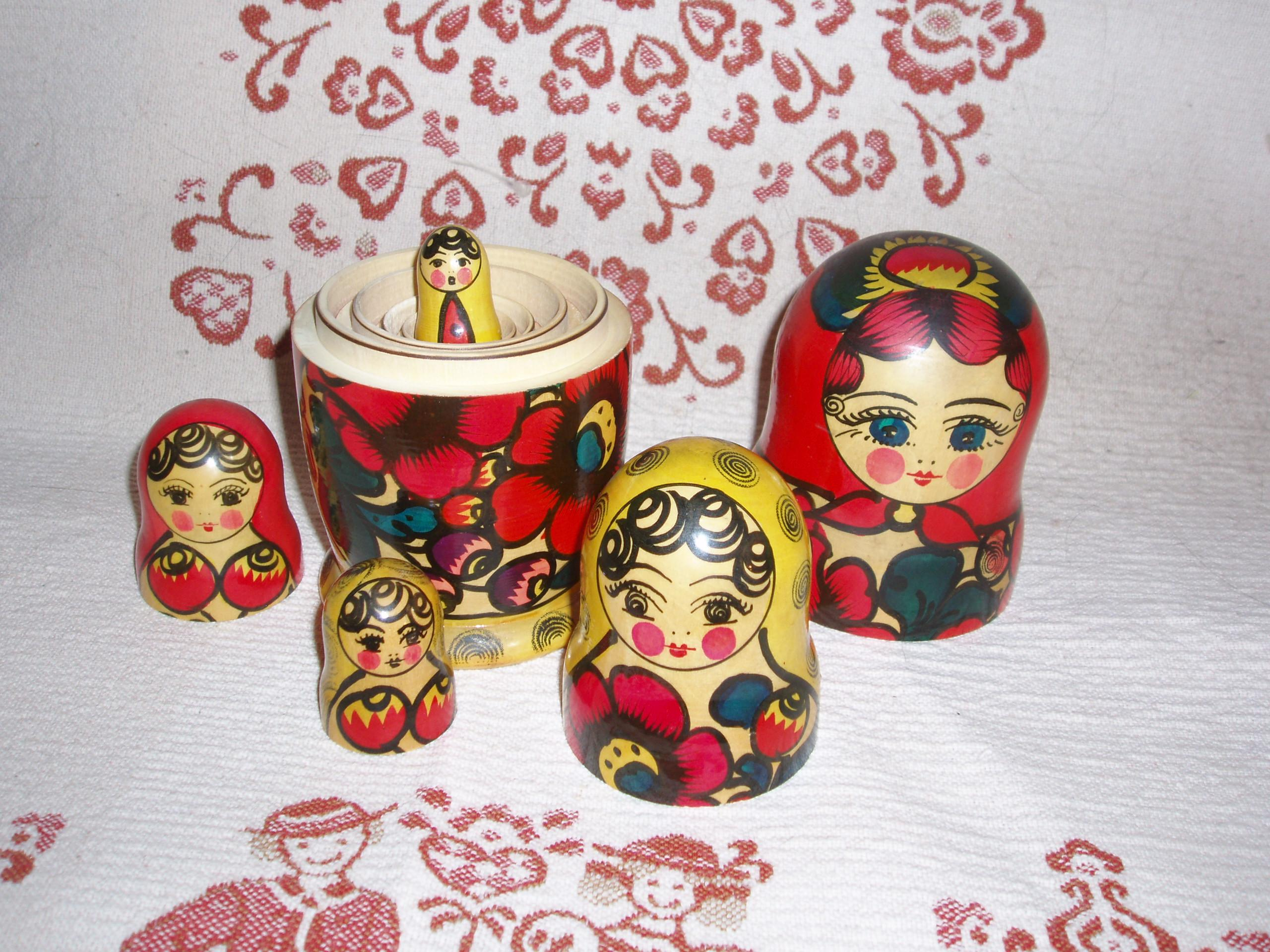
Matryoshka dolls serve as the inspiration and the characters, inventory, and verbs for the adventure game Stacking.

Stacking is the second game, following Costume Quest, to come from Double Fine that was initially created during an "Amnesia Fortnight" event during Brütal Legend's development period. Tim Schafer had used the Fortnight during a time where the fate of Brütal Legend's publication was unclear, dividing the company into four teams to prototype smaller games. The game's creator and project lead is Lee Petty, who had been the art director for Brütal Legend. Petty had wanted to create a contemporary adventure game, maintaining the characters and stories while reinventing the normal point-and-click interface used for such games. After observing his daughter playing with matryoshka dolls, he realized that the dolls themselves could be the characters, the inventory, and the action verbs at the same time. Petty and Schafer later reflected that the use of dolls, a common toy, would help to make the game appealing to the casual player, as they would quickly understand the mechanics of stacking and unstacking, while still having an allure for hardcore players with deeper gameplay mechanics. The idea of using these dolls would later be of benefit in production, as the basic structure of the doll model in the game's engine could easily be reused for the more than one hundred unique dolls within the game. Schafer assisted in helping Petty to write the game's story and to design some of the puzzles. Schafer estimated the total budget for the game at $2 million.

The game contains a central hub level, the Royal Train Station, and four additional levels that the player travels to through the Train Station. Each level was designed with a number of puzzles that allowed the player to approach in any order, while keeping the level size small and uncomplicated to prevent the player from becoming lost. Most of the puzzles have been designed with multiple solutions; Petty stated they wanted to cater to both the casual player, who may only want to find one of the solutions to progress in the game, and the more dedicated player, who would likely spend time to discover all of the intended solutions. This was furthered by allowing the player to freely roam through previously-completed areas to complete all the puzzles, including after completing the main story. The puzzles and challenges were designed to be able to be completed in short segments, giving the player more freedom to play it at their own pace. Petty wanted to make sure the player had time to contemplate the puzzles or explore the environment in a manner of older adventure games, though still assured that his environments felt alive and animated. The levels themselves are designed using a mix of the Great Depression and Victorian era designs, using virtual household items such as marbles and safety pins, an inspiration that came from interest in dioramas and miniature stages. The game itself presents cutscenes with dialog in the fashion of early silent films, where a text plaque is shown to show the dialog after it is acted out and scene takes place on a theater stage.

As part of the game's promotion, Double Fine offered a set of matryoshka dolls based on characters in the game; the initial run was sold out in less than 24 hrs. THQ released a downloadable content. The first add-on, "The Lost Hobo King", has been released in April 2011, and includes new dolls and a new stage to explore. It focuses on Charlie helping Levi's uncle Rufus to find the crown to become the king of hobos in the town of Camelfoot.

Stacking along with Costume Quest were acquired by Nordic Games during publisher THQ's bankruptcy. In November 2013, Double Fine and Nordic Games negotiated a deal for Double Fine to take over publishing rights for both games, while Nordic will help to publish and distribute retail copies of these games and Double Fine's Psychonauts for Windows and Mac OS X systems in early 2014.

== Reception ==
Reception

Aggregate scores
Aggregator	Score
GameRankings	86.02%
Metacritic	84/100

Review scores
Publication	Score
1Up.com	A
Eurogamer	8/10
Game Informer	8.5/10
GameSpot	8.0/10
IGN	8.5/10

Stacking has received largely positive critical appraisal. Most reviewers commented on the short length of the game if one simply progressed through the story without exploring any of the alternate solutions or side puzzles, and may be considered too short a game for the $15 price. Many felt that with the full exploration possible within the game, Stacking is well-worth the price without becoming too long or repetitive; Chad Sepieha of The Globe and Mail stated that the game is "a great example of what a $15 digitally distributed game can be", while Justin Haywald of 1UP.com found strong preference for the way that Stacking "condenses a fun experience into several great hours rather than overextending itself".

The game's core gameplay was considered to be very accessible, in part due to its alluring visuals. The controls were considered simple enough to be easily taught to a casual player, and provides enough hints so that the player rarely will be stuck to progress in the game. The use of multiple solutions to solve various challenges was praised; as stated by Jeff Marchiafava of Game Informer, providing multiple solutions helps to "[solve] one of the most common problems with the [adventure game] genre" as players do not have to guess at one specific line of thought programmed by the developers. The multiple solutions also provide a means of enticing players to seek out all solutions, as finding the solutions can be "logical and rewarding to work out", according to GameSpot's Carolyn Petit. Christian Donlan of Eurogamer considered this design one that "actively encourages a second play-through and an addled imagination". Many reviews noted that most of the puzzles were somewhat simple, solved with the use of only one doll only until late in the game, making for some awkward pacing in the game. In particular, late in the game, players can combine the special abilities of certain dolls when stacked, a gameplay feature that would have been more interesting to explore earlier in the title. The added collection and Hi-Jinks goals were found to help with extending the game beyond the core story and provide ways of experimenting with the dolls to find solutions for the main puzzles. Some reviewers commented on a few issues with the game's camera in tight places and some other small technical issues, but felt these did not mar the overall experience.

Stacking's story and artwork were highlights of the game. The Guardian's Steve Boxer found the game's art to be "utterly delightful" and "sumptuous". Donlan considered the game's world a "wonderfully crafted place" that was able to combine "the echoing grandeur of 1930s architecture and sooty technology with the home-made ingenuity of LittleBigPlanet". Reviewers noted that the game is able to take serious issues such as the Great Depression and child labor, and turn them into a humorous backdrop. Kristine Steimer of IGN affirmed that the "witty dialogue and goofy animations amplify the fact that this game is not actually socialist propaganda".

Reviewing the game's Linux release, GamingOnLinux reviewer Hamish Paul Wilson gave the game 8/10, commenting that "Stacking is a good example of what can be done by a developer with limited resources and a lot of creative output". He also added that "with a fairly competitive price point and a solid Linux release, there is very little reason not to try the game for anyone who may be so inclined to try their hand at a little Matryoshka body snatching".
