= 2 Player Productions =

American video production company

2 Player Productions, Limited
- Industry: Video production
- Founded: 2005
- Founders: Paul Owens, Paul Levering, Asif Siddiky
- Headquarters: San Francisco, California
- Website: Official website

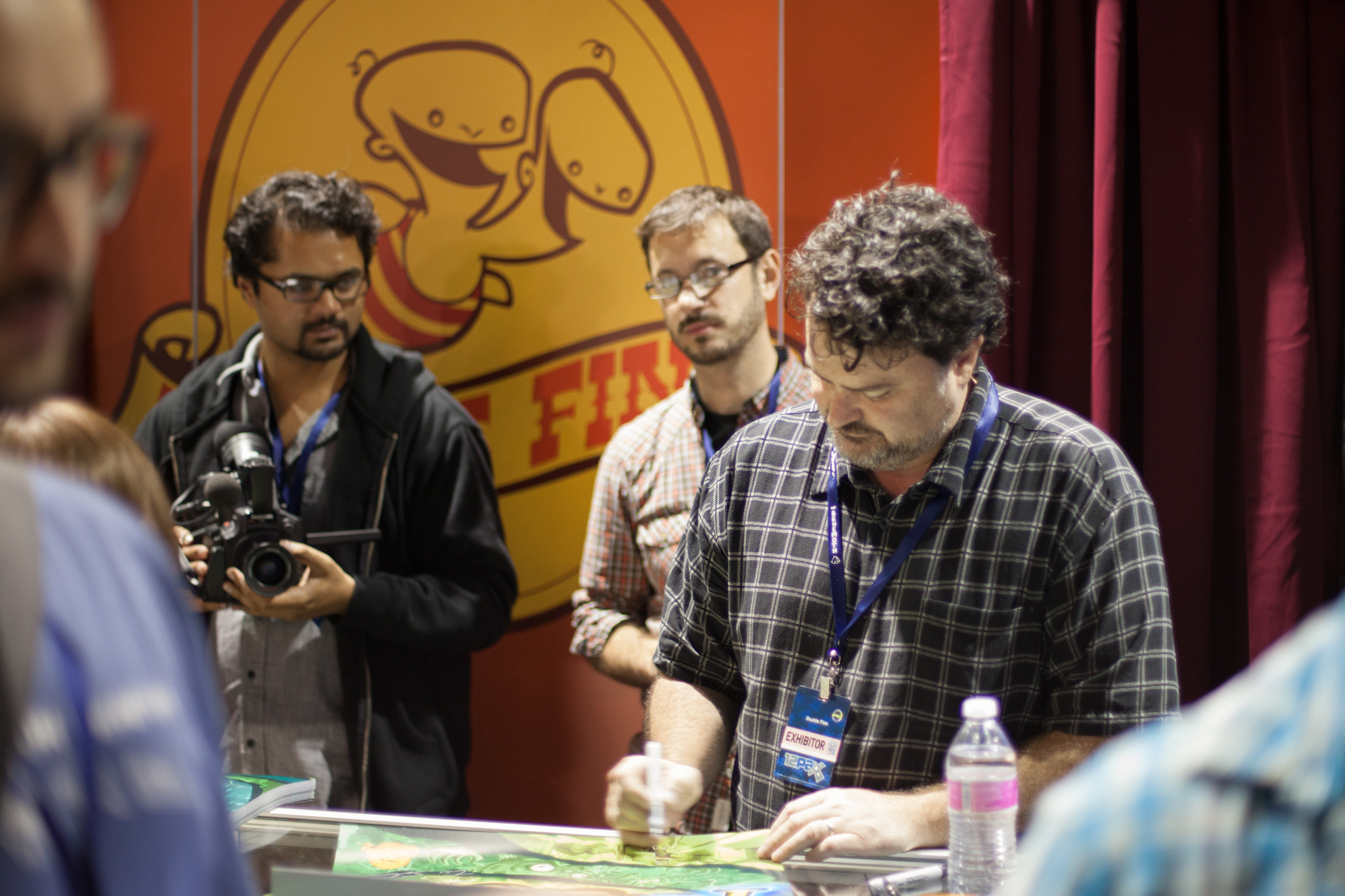
Asif Siddiky and Paul Owens with Tim Schafer at PAX Prime 2012

2 Player Productions, Limited is a video production company based in San Francisco, California. It was founded in 2005 by Paul Owens, Paul Levering, and Asif Siddiky. The company produces content relating to video game culture and the process of game production. They produced the documentary Reformat the Planet in 2008, and have since worked with mainstream companies including MTV and Spike.

== Projects ==
=== Reformat the Planet ===
Reformat the Planet is a documentary film, first shown in 2008 at the South by Southwest Film Festival film festival, about the chiptune music scene. The film depicts events in the culture such as Blip Festival.

=== Penny Arcade: The Series ===
Penny Arcade: The Series Is a 27-episodes web show about Penny Arcade and PAX. The first season was aired on GameTrailers and has a positive collective review of 9.1. Subsequent seasons were produced by Vantage Point Production.

=== Uncharted 3 ===
In 2010 the company was hired by game developer Naughty Dog to produce behind-the-scenes content detailing development for their game Uncharted 3.

=== Minecraft: The Story of Mojang ===
In December 2012, the company released Minecraft: The Story of Mojang, a documentary about the development of the video game Minecraft and its developer, the Swedish game company Mojang. The idea was first shown on February 21, 2011, as a proof of concept video to attempt to raise money to finish the project using Kickstarter. The company's goal was to raise $150,000. This goal was met on March 26, 2011, however people continued to donate so that the final amount raised was $210,297. Depending on the amount donated contributors will have an opportunity to share their personal story in the documentary.

=== Double Fine Adventure! ===
In February 2012, Double Fine Productions became the first game company to fully fund a high-budget video-game via Kickstarter, a crowdfunding website. As part of their funding agreement, Double Fine pledged to hire 2 Player Productions to document the entire development process as a serial documentary, with roughly monthly episodes, made available to all backers of the project. Leading up to the release of the game's final act, Double Fine also began making the episodes freely available on YouTube in early March 2015. The 20 episode series concluded in July 2015, three months after the final act of the game was officially released.

=== Double Fine PsychOdyssey ===
Double Fine PsychOdyssey is the follow up to Double Fine Adventure and focuses on the creation of Psychonauts Two and Psychonauts and the Rhombus of Ruin. It spans seven years, starting in 2015, the ten year anniversary of the original Psychonauts video game. The series is 33 episodes long, including the epilogue episode released a year after the initial release of the rest of the series. It is currently hosted for free on YouTube, hosted and downloadable on the internet archive and is also available for purchase as a Blu-Ray box set via fangamer.
