= Leap Motion =

Former American company

Leap Motion, Inc.
- Industry: Motion controller
- Founded: 2010
- Founder: Michael Buckwald; David Holz
- Fate: Acquired in 2019 (by Ultraleap)
- Headquarters: San Francisco, California, United States
- Website: leapmotion.com (archived in Feb 2019)

Leap Motion, Inc. (formerly OcuSpec Inc.) was an American company, active from 2010 to 2019, that manufactured and marketed a computer hardware sensor device. The devices supported hand and finger motions as input, analogous to a mouse, but required no hand contact or touching. In 2016, the company released new software designed for hand tracking in virtual reality. The company was sold to the British company Ultrahaptics in 2019, which rebranded the two companies under the new name Ultraleap.

== History ==
The technology for Leap Motion was first developed in 2008, while co-founder David Holz was studying for a Ph.D. in mathematics. Holz co-founded the company with Michael Buckwald in 2010. The company raised a $1.3 million seed financing round in June 2011 with investments from venture capital firms Andreessen Horowitz, Founders Fund, and SOSV, as well as several angel investors. In May 2012, Leap Motion announced a $12.75M Series A funding round led by Highland Capital Partners. In January 2013, Leap Motion announced a further series B round of funding for $30M.

After operating in quiet since 2010, Leap Motion publicly announced its first product, originally called The Leap, on May 21, 2012. The company launched a software developer program in October 2012 and distributed roughly 12,000 units to developers interested in creating applications for the device. While the device was slated to launch in May 2013, full-scale shipping was later delayed until July. In March 2014, it was reported in TechCrunch that roughly 500,000 units had been sold, far short of initial expectations; as a result, Leap Motion announced layoffs for 10 percent of its workforce, primarily in sales and marketing.

On April 7, 2014, COO Andy Miller left the company. In May 2014, Leap Motion released its version 2 software to developers in a public beta. In August 2014, the company launched a VR tracking mode for its core software, designed to provide hand tracking while the device is mounted on virtual reality headsets such as the Oculus Rift. Later that year, Leap Motion launched a global game jam in partnership with independent games festival IndieCade with over $75,000 in prizes. The competition received over 150 submissions. A second competition in 2015 resulted in 189 entries. In March 2015, it was announced that the upcoming OSVR Hacker Development Kit would include an optional faceplate with embedded Leap Motion module. In February 2016, Leap Motion released new software, called Orion, built for use in VR.

In May 2019, Leap Motion was acquired by Ultrahaptics; the combined company was named 'Ultraleap'. The reported sale price was $30 million - about 10% of the company's peak valuation of $300 million reached in 2013.

Ultraleap continued to develop the Leap Motion technology, supporting Android with the release of Gemini, and later expanding the computer vision functionality with Hyperion. Shortly after the launch of Hyperion in June 2024, the company announced plans to lay off half its workforce and sell off the Leap Motion technology once more. As of August 2024 they were still looking for a buyer.

== Partnerships ==
Leap Motion partnered with ASUS who was expected to ship high-end notebooks, and all-in-one PCs (AIO PCs) with the technology later in 2013. Leap Motion also announced a deal with Hewlett Packard to embed its technology within HP computers. In December 2013, it was reported Leap Motion would be embedded into eleven HP devices, including keyboards and laptops.

Leap Motion has formed retail partnerships with Best Buy, Newegg, and Amazon.com. Leap Motion Controllers were sold by Dick Smith in Australia and New Zealand.

== Technology ==
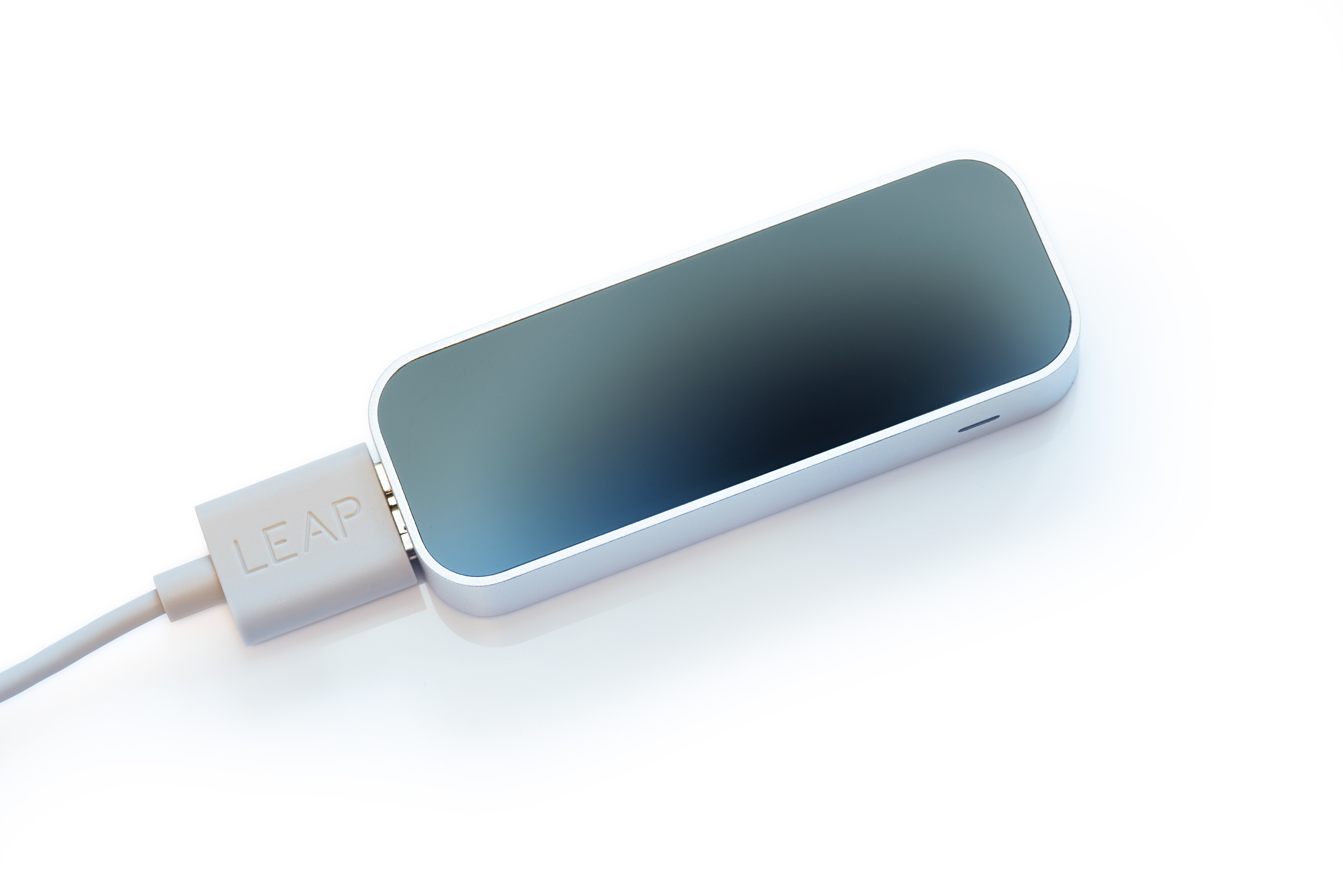
Leap Motion Controller

The Leap Motion Controller is a small USB peripheral device which is designed to be placed on a physical desktop, facing upward. It can also be mounted onto a virtual reality headset. Using two monochromatic IR cameras and three infrared LEDs, the device observes a roughly hemispherical area, to a distance of about 1 meter. The LEDs generate pattern-less IR light and the cameras generate almost 200 frames per second of reflected data. This is then sent through a USB cable to the host computer, where it is analyzed by the company software using "complex maths" in a way that has not been disclosed by the company, in some way synthesizing 3D position data by comparing the 2D frames generated by the two cameras. In a 2013 study, the overall average accuracy of the controller was shown to be 0.7 millimeters.

The smaller observation area and higher resolution of the device differentiates the product from the Kinect, which is more suitable for whole-body tracking in a space the size of a living room. In a demonstration to CNET, the controller was shown to perform tasks such as navigating a website, using pinch-to-zoom gestures on maps, high-precision drawing, and manipulating complex 3D data visualizations.

Leap Motion initially distributed thousands of units to developers who are interested in creating applications for the device. The Leap Motion Controller was first shipped in July 2013. In February 2016, Leap Motion released a major beta update to its core software. Dubbed Orion, the software is designed for hand tracking in virtual reality.

== Developer community ==
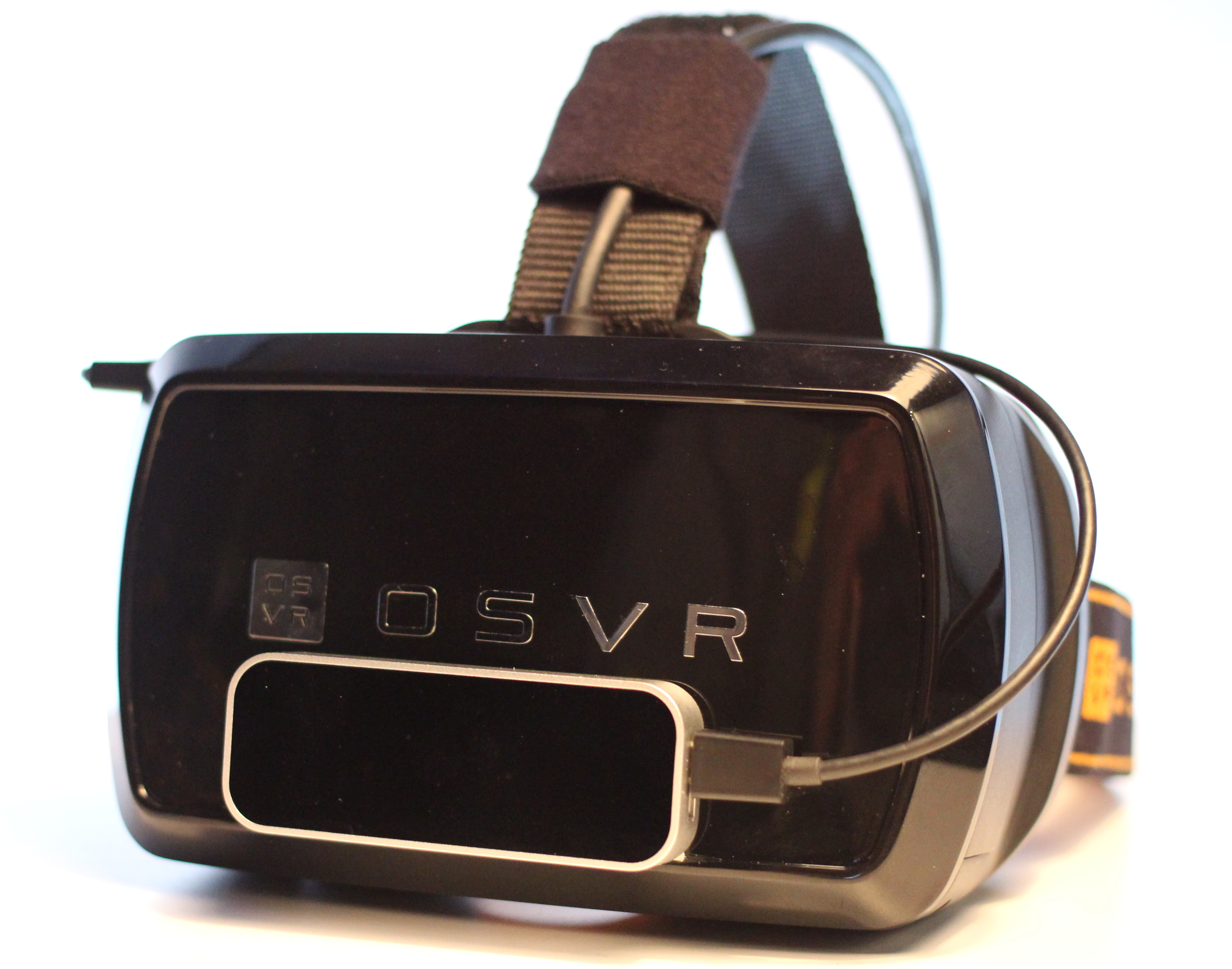
A Leap Motion controller attached to the front of an OSVR virtual reality development headset.

In December 2013, Founders Fund and SOSV announced the LEAP.AXLR8R, a business accelerator for startups making innovative use of the Leap Motion controller. Projects emerging from the accelerator included Diplopia (now Vivid Vision), a tech startup using the Leap Motion Controller and Oculus Rift for lazy eye sufferers, and MotionSavvy, which is developing a Leap Motion-equipped tablet case that can interpret American Sign Language.

Leap Motion had an app store called Airspace where it sold apps made by developers. As of May 2014, the store had over 200 apps, including a Google Earth integration, virtual clay sculpting app, digital musical instrument, and virtual reality demos. The store and client were officially retired on June 30, 2017. The URL to the store now redirects to the Leap Motion gallery.

The Leap Motion Controller has also been used by surgeons and researchers for medical software, automotive companies for concept cars, and musicians for composition in Ableton Live. In 2016, AltspaceVR added hand tracking support for the Leap Motion Controller to their online social platform.

In a video, Uriel Yehezkel demonstrated using the Leap Motion controller and GECO MIDI to control Ableton Live with hand gestures.

== Reception ==
On July 22, 2013, the controller was released to pre-order customers to mixed reviews. To some reviewers, the product feels underwhelming and does not live up to the hype. It is an "admirable distraction but not useful for truly productive usage" and to some it feels as though they "experienced a gimmick". Some reviews have expressed cautious optimism about the product's success and innovation. To other reviewers, the Leap Motion Controller seemed "pretty damned impressive" and that the device "demonstrates Leap Motion’s impressive mastery of computer vision." While the Orion software offers improvements in tracking and as the system continues to improve, some users feel that "it fails just often enough to undercut its value as an interface."

The Orion beta works on the existing peripheral, and the company also announced that Orion hardware would be embedded in future virtual reality headsets .
