= Jane Ng =

American 3D environment artist

- Jane Ng attends the 2018 Game Developers Conference
- Born: Jane Ng
- Education: Swarthmore College
- Notable work: Firewatch; The Cave; Stacking; Spore
- Website: janeng.com

Jane Ng is a Chinese-American 3D environment artist, best known for her work on Firewatch, The Cave, and Brütal Legend. She previously worked at Campo Santo, a game studio that is part of Valve, as a Senior Environment Artist. Other notable works include Stacking, Costume Quest, Spore, and The Godfather.

She graduated from Swarthmore College in 2001 having studied Studio Arts and Engineering.

== Career ==
Ng has worked in the video game industry for more than 10 years. She started her journey into the video game industry through a summer internship position at Ronin Studios.

After Ronin went out of business, she moved on to working at Electronic Arts and began work on Return of the King.

After three years of working at Electronic Arts, she moved to Double Fine Productions where she worked on titles such as Stacking, Costume Quest, and Brutal Legend.

After 6 years of employment, she moved on to her most notable role as the lead environment artist at Campo Santo as they made their flagship title Firewatch.

Development for Firewatch began with a painting by Campo Santo co-founder Olly Moss. Ng adapted the painting's aesthetic style into a 3D environment with the color and inspiration drawn from both New Deal advertisements and icons from the National Park Service as well as a camping trip in Yellowstone National Park in which the team visited a preserved fire lookout tower two miles (3.2 km) from the campsite. Ng hand-modeled 23 unique tree models to be placed throughout the game 4,600 times. A custom shader was also employed to produce more stylized and simplified foliage. The in-game fire lookout towers were built in accordance with government specifications, utilizing standard lumber size, after Ng's first attempt was unsatisfactory. She later spoke on the need of "feeling real" rather than producing overly realistic or detailed game assets.

For the studio's unreleased title, In the Valley of Gods, Ng has written on the significance of accurately designing Black hair for one of the game's protagonists, a Black woman named Zora.
