= Ryan Davis (video game journalist) =

American video game journalist (1979–2013)

- Davis at PAX Prime 2010
- Born: June 4, 1979; Los Alamitos, California, U.S.
- Died: July 3, 2013 (aged 34); U.S.
- Occupations: Video game journalist and podcaster
- Notable credit(s): GameSpot journalist (2000–2008); Giant Bomb co-founder, editor, podcaster (2008–2013)
- Spouse: Anna Davis (m. 2013)

Ryan Davis (June 4, 1979 – July 3, 2013) was an American video game journalist and podcaster. Davis began working as a technical supporter before being recruited for the gaming website GameSpot by Jeff Gerstmann in 2000. After Gerstmann was fired, the two founded the gaming website Giant Bomb in 2008, with Davis serving as its senior editor and hosting the Giant Bombcast podcast.

Davis died on July 3, 2013, of natural causes. Multiple gaming websites and personalities wrote tributes to Davis, with the illustrator Olly Moss and musician C418 creating art in his memory.

== Early life ==
Ryan Davis was born on June 4, 1979, in Los Alamitos, California, and moved to Petaluma as a child. According to his father, Richard Davis, his son showed admiration for computers and video games from an early age. After graduating from the Nonesuch School in Sebastopol, Ryan Davis worked in San Francisco as a technical supporter.

== Career ==
In 2000, Davis was recruited by Jeff Gerstmann of the gaming website GameSpot and soon began writing news articles and reviews. He also co-hosted video shows, including Time Trotters and On the Spot. Davis and Gerstmann were also part of the alternative rap group Suburban All-Stars.

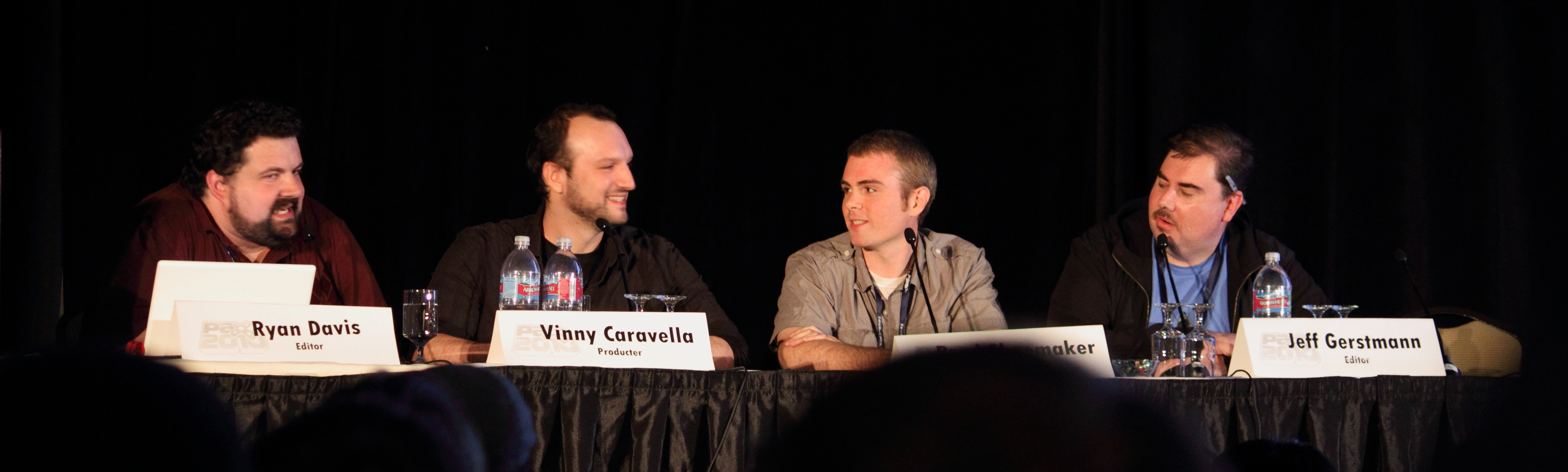
Giant Bomb editorial team (from left to right): Ryan Davis, Vinny Caravella, Brad Shoemaker and Jeff Gerstmann in 2010

In 2007, Gerstmann was fired from GameSpot, leading to numerous writers leaving the website in protest. Davis announced his departure from GameSpot in February 2008, citing Gerstmann's firing as one of his reasons for leaving. Davis said, "Jeff's firing just destroyed me, and I think it shed a light on the other stuff that I had been kind of rolling along with". Following this, Davis joined Gerstmann in founding the gaming website Giant Bomb in 2008. Along with being a Senior Editor, Davis was the host of their live shows and the Giant Bombcast podcast, for which he became particularly known. He also led Giant Bomb's panels at PAX Prime and PAX East. Due to his fame, Davis would occasionally be recognized on the streets.

== Death ==
Davis died on July 3, 2013, less than a week after marrying his longtime girlfriend Anna Davis. According to his father, Davis's death was "sudden but peaceful" and from natural causes. His death was revealed five days later on the Giant Bomb website, in a tribute article by Matthew Rorie.

Fans of Davis paid their condolences in the Giant Bomb forums, with the post announcing his death gathering over 6,800 comments by July 13. Tribute articles were written by Justin McElroy of Polygon, Stephen Totilo of Kotaku, Ryan Aston of Slant Magazine, Greg Miller of IGN, and Justin Ouellette of The Mary Sue, with condolences paid by James Brightman of GamesIndustry.biz, Kris Ligman of Game Developer, Hanuman Welch of Complex, and Patrick Garratt of VG247. Dave Snider, a colleague and friend of Davis, created the website thanksryan.com as a memorial, and the illustrator Olly Moss created art of Davis. Personalities such as Gary Whitta, Sean Vanaman, and Tim Schafer, along with the companies Amazon Video Games and Ubisoft, paid their condolences on Twitter, and his death became the third-most trending topic on that platform. The Giant Bombcast hosted a memorial episode, while for GameTrailers, Geoff Keighley hosted a memorial episode along with guests Michael Pachter, Jessica Chobot, and Kyle Bosman. GameSpot published a video on their YouTube channel remembering Davis. C418 created the track "Taswell" as part of the Minecraft soundtrack as a tribute honoring Davis. (Note: The title references Davis's username on Twitter, @taswell.)
