= Cissy Jones =

American voice actress

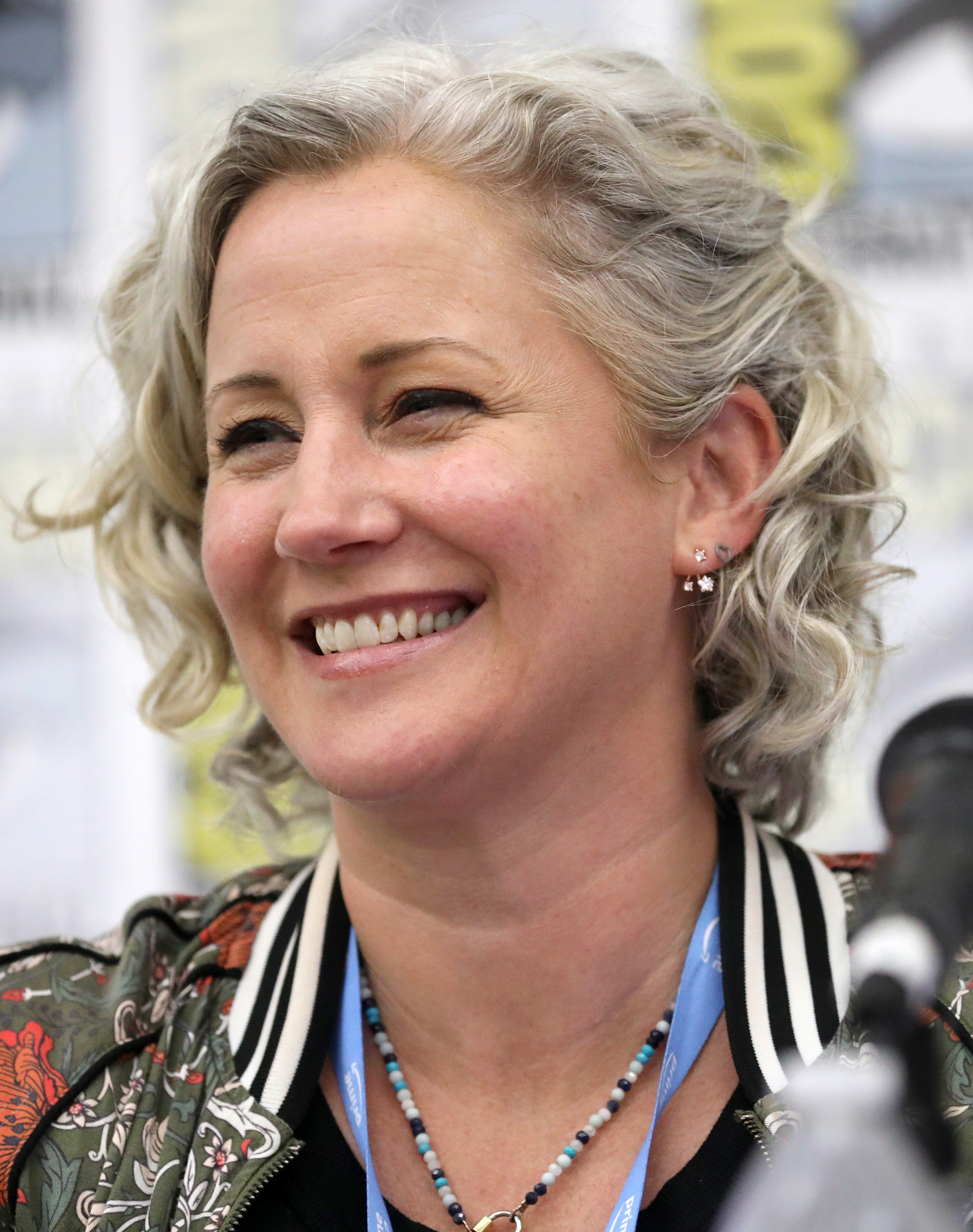
- Jones at San Diego Comic-Con in 2023
- Occupation: Voice actress
- Years active: 2010–present

Cissy Jones is an American voice actress.

Jones's voice has appeared in games such as Firewatch, The Walking Dead, Life Is Strange, Grand Theft Auto V, and Darksiders III. She voiced the part of Lois Lane in the 2018 game Lego DC Super-Villains.

After some years in white-collar work, Jones began her voice acting career in 2011 after meeting writer Sean Vanaman and starring as Katjaa in The Walking Dead. Vanaman kept in touch with Jones and offered her work when Campo Santo needed voices for characters. Her dialogue for the part of Delilah in Firewatch took two years to record. At the 13th British Academy Games Awards in 2017, she received a BAFTA Games Award in the Performer category for her work on the game.

== Filmography ==
List of dubbing performances in anime
Year	Title	Role	Notes
2016	Kabaneri of the Iron Fortress	Horobi	Episode: "Fangs of Destruction"
2018–19	Naruto: Shippuden	Kaguya Ōtsutsuki	
2020	Dragon Quest: Your Story	Mada	
2022	Tiger & Bunny 2	Zamira Tchaikoskaya	

List of television performances
Year	Title	Role	Notes
2017	Legends of Tomorrow	Dominator Queen	Episode: "Phone Home"
2019	Cleopatra in Space	Theoda	Episode: "School Break"
2020–2023	The Owl House	Lilith Clawthorne, Dottie	
2022–2025	Transformers: EarthSpark	Elita-1, V.A.L, additional voices	
2024–2025	Blood of Zeus	Demeter, Harpy, Iris	12 episodes
2024	Ark: The Animated Series	The Gladiatrix	

List of voice performances in direct-to-video and television films
Year	Title	Role	Notes
2018	Suicide Squad: Hell to Pay	Knockout, Female Announcer	
2020	Superman: Man of Tomorrow	Nurse	

List of voice and dubbing performances in video games
Year	Title	Role	Notes
2010	Heroes of Newerth	Sister Death, Manticore, Cosplay Envy	
2011	Rift	Shyla Starhearth, Miela, Princess Isabella, Lady Glasya, Pallas, various voices	Also in Storm Legion and Nightmare Tide
2011	Grotesque Tactics 2: Dungeons & Donuts	Professor Oke, Synthia	
2011–12	Law & Order: Legacies	Defense Attorney, Judge, additional characters	
2012	The Walking Dead	Katjaa, Jolene, Linda, Brie	
2013	Aliens: Colonial Marines	Susan Faraday	
2013	The Walking Dead: 400 Days	Shel, Dee	
2013	Grand Theft Auto V	The Local Population	
2014	TOME: Immortal Arena	Valora	
2014	The Wolf Among Us	Kelsey Brannagan	
2014	Infamous: Second Son	Additional voices	
2014	Moebius: Empire Rising	Dominique Freyre	
2014	The Walking Dead: Season Two	Shel	
2014	Murdered: Soul Suspect	Additional voices	
2014	WildStar	Granok Female, Torine Sisterhood	
2014	Infamous First Light	Additional voices	
2014	Gabriel Knight: Sins of the Fathers 20th Anniversary Edition	Grace Nakamura	
2015	Life Is Strange	Joyce Price	
2015	Batman: Arkham Knight	Nora Fries	Season of Infamy DLC
2015	Lego Dimensions	Additional voices	
2015	Halo 5: Guardians	Additional voices	
2015	Fallout 4	Doctor Duff, Doctor Patricia Montgomery	
2016	Lego Marvel's Avengers	Laura Barton	
2016	Firewatch	Delilah	
2016	Naruto Shippuden: Ultimate Ninja Storm 4	Kaguya Ōtsutsuki	English dub
2016	The Walking Dead: Michonne	Norma, Vanessa	
2016	Adrift	Alex Oshima, Elizabeth Hudson	
2016	Baldur's Gate: Siege of Dragonspear	Caelar Argent	
2017	Horizon Zero Dawn	White Teeth Shaman, Furahni, additional voices	Also in The Frozen Wilds
2017	The Search	Player	
2017	Dishonored: Death of the Outsider	Citizens	
2017	Farpoint	Computer Voice	
2017	Agents of Mayhem	MiMi, Pride Trooper	
2017	XCOM 2: War of the Chosen	Reaper Soldier	
2017	Destiny 2	Sloane	Also in Season of the Deep,Season of the Witch, and Episode 3: Heresy
2017	Middle-earth: Shadow of War	Humans, Nazgul	
2018	Where the Water Tastes Like Wine	Bertha	
2018	Call of Duty: Black Ops 4	Oracle/Medusa	
2018	Lego DC Super-Villains	Lois Lane	
2018	Red Dead Redemption 2	The Local Pedestrian Population	
2018	Spyro Reignited Trilogy	The Sorceress	
2018	Darksiders III	Fury	
2019	Days Gone	Additional voices	
2019	Crash Team Racing: Nitro Fueled	Ami	
2019	Remnant: From the Ashes	Player (Female), Ellen Ford	
2019	Eliza	Maya	
2020	Half-Life: Alyx	Olga	
2020	Call of the Sea	Norah Everhart	
2021	It Takes Two	Book of Love	
2021	Shin Megami Tensei V	Abdiel	
2022	Evil Dead: The Game	Annie Knowby	
2023	Baldur's Gate 3	The Netherbrain	
2023	Starfield	Andreja	
2023	American Arcadia	Vivian Walton	
2023	The Texas Chain Saw Massacre	Nancy Slaughter	Buyable character on the game's distribution platforms
2023	Hellboy: Web of Wyrd	Verdani	
2023	Naruto x Boruto: Ultimate Ninja Storm Connections	Kaguya Otsutsuki / Player H (10NARUTO10)	
2024	The Elder Scrolls Online: Gold Road	Additional voices	
2024	Shin Megami Tensei V: Vengeance	Abdiel	
2024	Starfield: Shattered Space	Andreja	
2024	Wayfinder	Arsenal	
