= Chris Remo =

American video game designer

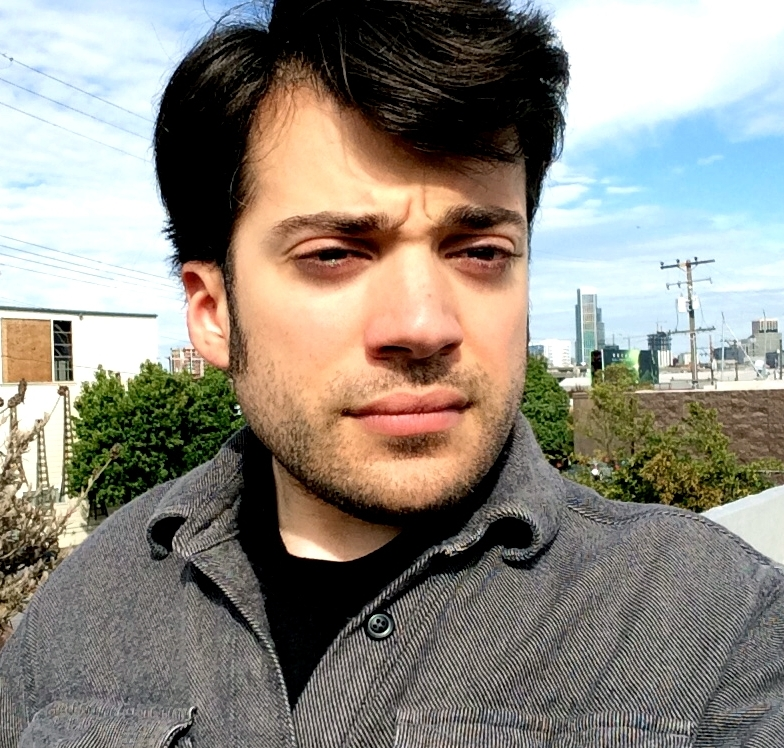
- Born: September 10, 1984 (age 42); San Francisco, California
- Occupations: Video game designer, composer, podcaster, writer

Chris Remo is an American video game designer, composer, writer, podcaster, YouTuber and former journalist.

As a journalist, he cofounded the original Idle Thumbs website as well as its flagship podcast, and served as Editor-in-Chief of Shacknews and Editor at Large for Gamasutra.

He composed the music for Thirty Flights of Loving, Gone Home, Spacebase DF-9 and Firewatch. He co-wrote The Cave with Ron Gilbert at Double Fine Productions. In early 2014, he left Double Fine to join his Idle Thumbs co-hosts Jake Rodkin and Sean Vanaman at Campo Santo, where he contributed to the studio's narrative adventure game Firewatch as a game and story designer, composer, and audio director.

Since 2021, Remo has posted daily videos to his YouTube channel featuring gameplay of New York Times games, such as the Crossword, Wordle, and Connections.

== Career ==
Chris Remo began his career as a video game journalist, writing for Adventure Gamers. He co-founded Idle Thumbs, a video game culture website, with colleagues from Adventure Gamers and The International House of Mojo in 2004. As a professional journalist, he was Editor-in-Chief of Shacknews and later Gamasutra, becoming Editor at Large. After Idle Thumbs went dark in 2007, Remo revived it as a podcast in late 2008 with other Thumbs writers Nick Breckon (then of Shacknews) and Jake Rodkin (then of Telltale Games). While podcasting for Idle Thumbs, he composed and performed "Space Asshole", a satirical song about the protagonist of Red Faction: Guerrilla, which went viral.

He left his position at Gamasutra in 2010 to work as a community manager and producer for Boston-based Irrational Games, ending the first run of the Idle Thumbs podcast at the same time. The show's then-final episode was recorded live at the 2010 Penny Arcade Expo.

In early 2012, Remo returned to San Francisco to start a crowdfunded campaign on Kickstarter to revive the Idle Thumbs podcast with then-co-hosts Rodkin and Sean Vanaman. As part of the Kickstarter campaign, Remo composed the soundtrack for Blendo Games' Thirty Flights of Loving, a video game that would be released to backers of the campaign.

He also took a job in a multi-faceted role at Double Fine Productions, where he contributed to various games, including as a composer and game designer for Spacebase DF-9, an Amnesia Fortnight project, and as co-writer of The Cave alongside Ron Gilbert.

Remo composed the soundtrack to Gone Home, a game written by former Idle Thumbs co-host Steve Gaynor, and co-wrote Rogue One: X-Wing VR Mission for Star Wars Battlefront, developed by Criterion Games.

As a member of independent game studio Campo Santo, Remo was a game and story designer, composer, and audio director of the BAFTA-winning narrative adventure Firewatch, and has spoken about the game’s design at numerous game development conferences around the world.

In 2018, Campo Santo was acquired by Seattle-area game developer Valve.

== Works ==
- 2005 Psychonauts, tester (Double Fine Productions)
- 2009 Drawn to Life: The Next Chapter Wii, composer (Planet Moon Studios)
- 2012 Unbearable: Or How They Learned to Stop Worrying and Love the Bear, composer, writer (What Would Molydeux?)
- 2012 Thirty Flights of Loving, composer (Blendo Games)
- 2012 Spacebase DF-9 composer, designer (Double Fine Productions)
- 2013 The Cave, co-writer (Double Fine Productions)
- 2013 Gone Home, composer (The Fullbright Company)
- 2013 Captain Bubblenaut, composer (Pixelsaurus Games)
- 2014 Spacebase DF-9, composer (Double Fine Productions)
- 2015 Wheels of Aurelia, dialogue support (Santa Ragione)
- 2016 Firewatch, game and story designer, composer, audio director (Campo Santo)
- 2016 Star Wars Battlefront – Rogue One: X-Wing VR Mission, writer (Criterion Games)
- 2020 Dota Underlords (Valve)
- 2020 Half-Life: Alyx (Valve)
- 2022 Saturnalia, writer (Santa Ragione)
- 2024 Life Is Strange: Double Exposure, senior game designer
- 2026 Life Is Strange: Reunion, senior game designer
- 2026 Star Wars: Galactic Racer, lead writer
- TBA In the Valley of Gods, game and story designer, composer (Valve)
