= Jake Rodkin =

American video game designer

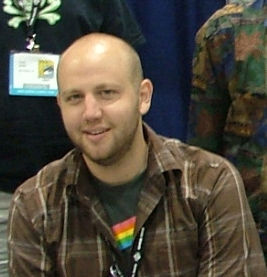
- Rodkin in 2007
- Born: Petaluma, California, U.S.
- Occupations: Game designer, graphic designer

Jake Rodkin is an American video game designer, writer, graphic designer, and podcaster. He was the co-project leader of Tales of Monkey Island and the co-project leader and co-writer of The Walking Dead, Poker Night at the Inventory, and Puzzle Agent 2. He was also the director of the fifth episode of Sam & Max: The Devil's Playhouse, and designer and writer of Firewatch.

Rodkin co-founded the video game developer Campo Santo with Sean Vanaman, Nels Anderson and Olly Moss, and joined Valve when Campo Santo was acquired by the company in 2018. Outside the video game industry, Rodkin also co-founded the Idle Thumbs podcast network and its flagship podcast, which he co-hosted alongside Chris Remo, Nick Breckon and Sean Vanaman.

== Career ==
Jake Rodkin began his career writing for the gaming websites The International House of Mojo and Adventure Gamers, and co-founded Idle Thumbs. He joined Telltale Games as a graphic designer. He eventually became a game designer, director, writer, and project leader at Telltale. In September 2013, he and Sean Vanaman left Telltale and joined with Olly Moss and Mark of the Ninja lead designer Nels Anderson to found their own studio, Campo Santo. In April 2018, Rodkin joined Valve when the company acquired Campo Santo. Rodkin is also part of Skunkape Games, a studio currently developing remasters of Telltale's Sam & Max games.

== Recognition ==
The re-issue of the comic collection Sam & Max: Surfin' the Highway, which Jake Rodkin co-designed with franchise creator Steve Purcell, was nominated for the Eisner Award for "Best Graphic Album-Reprint" in 2009.

Tales of Monkey Island, for which Jake Rodkin was the season co-director, was nominated for "best artistic design" and won for the award for "biggest surprise" at IGN's Best of E3 2009 Awards. After release, it won the PC Gamer 2009 adventure game of the year, was nominated for the IGN best adventure game of the year for PC and Wii, won the Adventure Gamers Best Adventure of 2009, and was named the "Best Series Revival" by OC Weekly.

Puzzle Agent 2, which was co-written by Jake Rodkin, was nominated for IGN's Best of E3 2011 Awards for "Best iPhone/iPad Game".

The 2012 episodic game series The Walking Dead, in which Jake Rodkin was the season co-designer, won over 80 game of the year awards.

Rodkin won Writing in a Drama at the 2017 National Academy of Video Game Trade Reviewers Awards for his work on Firewatch.

== Credited works ==
=== Bibliography ===
- 2009 Sam & Max: Surfin' the Highway (reprint), graphic design (Telltale Games)

=== Video games ===
Year	Title	Role	Developer
2006	CSI: 3 Dimensions of Murder	Graphic design	Telltale Games
2006	Bone: The Great Cow Race	Graphic design	Telltale Games
2007	Sam & Max Save the World	Graphic design	Telltale Games
2007	CSI: Hard Evidence	Graphic design	Telltale Games
2008	Sam & Max: Beyond Time and Space	Graphic design	Telltale Games
2008	Strong Bad's Cool Game for Attractive People	Graphic design	Telltale Games
2009	Wallace & Gromit's Grand Adventures	Graphic design	Telltale Games
2009	Tales of Monkey Island	Co-project leader	Telltale Games
2010	Nelson Tethers: Puzzle Agent	Writer	Telltale Games
2010	Sam & Max: The Devil's Playhouse	Graphic design, director of "The City that Dares Not Sleep"	Telltale Games
2011	Hector: Badge of Carnage	Additional art	Telltale Games
2011	Jurassic Park: The Game	Artist (user interface)	Telltale Games
2011	Puzzle Agent 2	Co-writer, co-project leader	Telltale Games
2012	The Walking Dead	Co-project leader	Telltale Games
2016	Firewatch	Director	Campo Santo
2020	Half-Life: Alyx	Unspecified role	Valve Corporation
2020	Sam & Max Save the World Remastered	Interface design	Skunkape Games
2026	Poker Night at the Inventory (2026 remaster)	Interface design	Skunkape Games
