= The International House of Mojo =

Gaming fan website

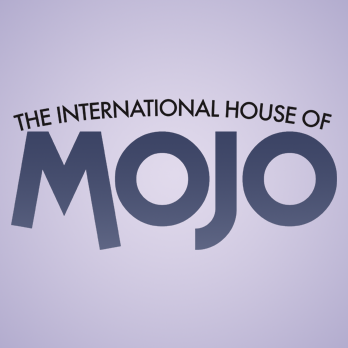
- Website type: Gaming website
- Website: www.mixnmojo.com
- Commercial: No
- Launched: 1997

The International House of Mojo (often called Mixnmojo) is a website focused on LucasArts video games. It later expanded to cover studios founded by former LucasArts employees, including Double Fine Productions, Telltale Games, Autumn Moon Entertainment and Crackpot Entertainment. It was founded in 1997 by James Spafford and is among the longest-running "fan sites" on the internet.

Mixnmojo once enjoyed an active relationship with LucasArts, and reviews have occasionally been quoted in the company's marketing such as on the cover of the UK release of Monkey Island Special Edition Collection. The site was also referenced in the book Rogue Leaders: The Story of LucasArts, and staff has been interviewed by the gaming press.

Developers highlighted by the site have often reciprocated its fondness. Tim Schafer of Double Fine Productions called Mixnmojo their "friendly friends" and praised the staff for their knowledge. At E3 2003, in order to make light of an extended downtime the site was experiencing, staffers in attendance playfully cajoled then-producer Dan Pettit of LucasArts into appearing in a video painting him as complicit in the site's technical woes. The site once even received permission from LucasArts to pull an elaborate April Fools prank that announced a fictional fifth Monkey Island installment (at the time, the series only had four games) complete with fake cover art and sound files of Dominic Armato performing dialog invented by the staff.

Though created as an all-encompassing LucasArts site, Mixnmojo has always favored the studio's original titles, particularly its classic graphic adventure games, over the more popular Star Wars products. At times, this has strained the site's relationship with the company. As the site featured the unregulated opinions of its contributors rather a unified editorial point of view, it quickly established an endearingly quirky, if occasionally abrasive, tone in its editorials and news posts.

After the turn of the century, LucasArts began shifting away from original properties and the adventure genre in particular, culminating in the cancellation of Sam & Max: Freelance Police in 2004. In response to this, Mixnmojo began broadening its coverage to include studios operated by LucasArts alumni that they believe continue the creative spirit abandoned by the original company.

LucasArts was eventually shut down soon after Lucasfilm was purchased by Disney in 2012. Its oldest fan site remains active as an information hub for LucasArts legacy titles, which have remained topical due to their continued influence, remakes and re-releases, as well as a news source for games produced by key LucasArts alumni.

== The LF Network ==
At its height, Mixnmojo cultivated a diverse community of LucasArts fans and hosted a number of other sites directed at related franchises and itself belonged to the now defunct "LF Network." Another prominent LFN site, The SCUMM Bar, dedicated to the Monkey Island series, also remains active.

== Staff members in the video game industry ==
A number of former Mixnmojo staffers have gone on to have careers in the game industry, both in development and journalism. Jake Rodkin, Andrew Langley, Doug Tabacco and David Eggers even had stints at Telltale Games, during which they worked on Sam & Max and Monkey Island - franchises they once covered at Mixnmojo. Rodkin, who ultimately had a project leader role on a Sam & Max title, was the webmaster of a Sam & Max fan site hosted by LFN.

Rodkin, Spafford and Chris Remo, who was an editor for the online magazine Adventure Gamers for several years, collaborated to launch Idle Thumbs in 2004.

== Meaning of the name ==
"The International House of Mojo" comes from the name of the Voodoo Lady's business in Monkey Island 2: LeChuck's Revenge. The site's web address comes from "The Mix 'N' Mojo Voodoo Ingredient Proportion Dial" copy protection mechanism, also from Monkey Island 2.
