= Gone Home =

2013 video game

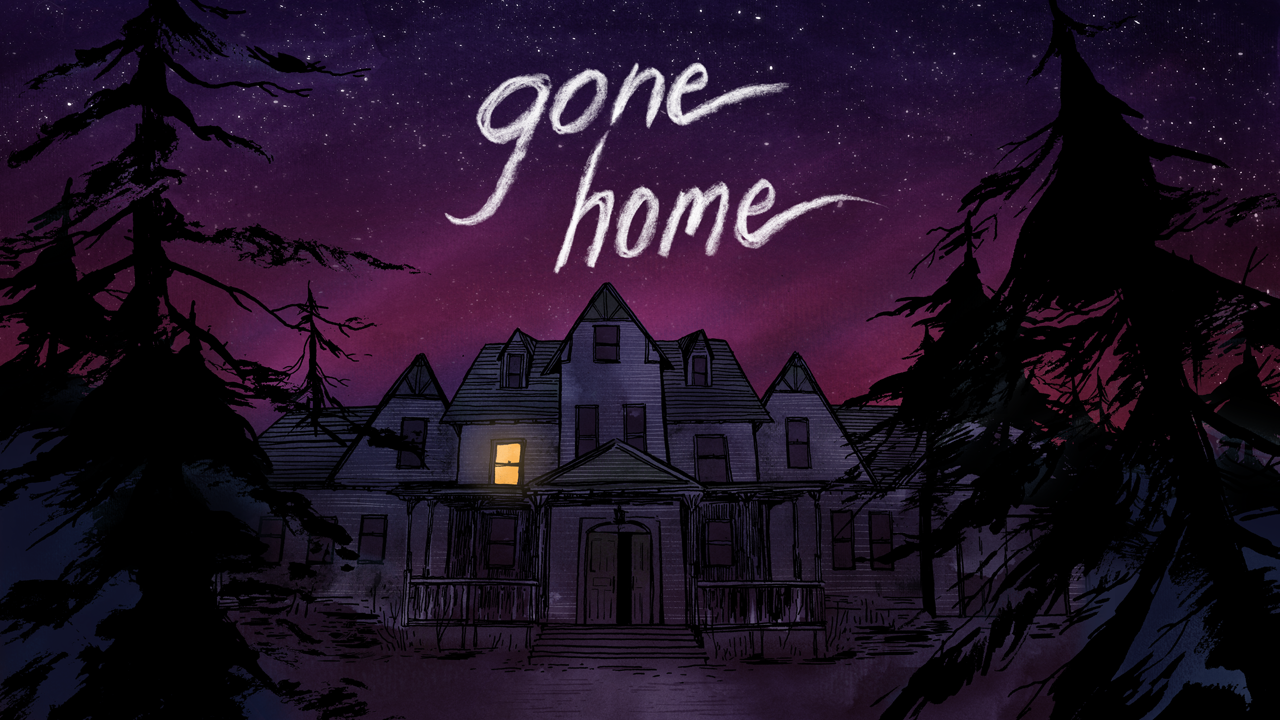
- Developers: The Fullbright Company; BlitWorks (Switch)
- Publishers: The Fullbright Company; Majesco (PS4, Xbox One); Annapurna Interactive (Switch)
- Designer: Steve Gaynor
- Programmer: Johnnemann Nordhagen
- Artists: Karla Zimonja; Kate Craig; Emily Carroll
- Composer: Chris Remo
- Engine: Unity
- Platforms: Windows; OS X; Linux; PlayStation 4; Xbox One; Nintendo Switch; iOS
- Release: Windows, OS X, Linux: WW: 15 August 2013; PS4, Xbox One: NA: 12 January 2016; PAL: 12 February 2016; Switch: WW: 6 September 2018; iOS: WW: 11 December 2018
- Genre: Walking simulator
- Mode: Single-player

Gone Home is a first-person walking simulator video game developed and published by The Fullbright Company. Gone Home was first released for Microsoft Windows, OS X, and Linux computers in August 2013, followed by console releases for the PlayStation 4 and Xbox One in January 2016, the Nintendo Switch in September 2018, and iOS in December 2018.

Set in the year 1995, Gone Home puts the player in the role of a young woman returning from overseas to her rural Oregon family home to find her family currently absent and the house empty, leaving her to piece together recent events. Gone Home does not feature much interactivity, but instead has the player explore the house at their own pace and determine what has transpired by examining items, journals, and other items left around the various rooms. The Fullbright team, having previously worked on BioShock 2: Minerva's Den, took concepts and ideas from that game to craft an exploration game to engage the player in uncovering the narration by non-linear progression by searching the house, while keeping the project manageable for their small team.

Gone Home received generally positive reviews at release.

== Gameplay ==
The player takes the role of Katie in the first-person view, who can move around the house and view and interact with objects. There are no defined goals in the game; however, the game encourages and rewards the player when they explore new areas of the house and search for new messages. Much of the interactivity rests upon looking at objects and notes within the house. In order to progress in the game, the player must find certain objects that unlock access to other parts of the house.

== Plot ==
The launch trailer sets the scene for the game.

On 7 June 1995, 21-year-old Katie Greenbriar (voiced by Sarah Elmaleh) returns home from overseas to her family's new home in fictional Boon County, Oregon. Her family consists of her father, Terry, a failed writer who makes a living reviewing home electronics; her mother, Janice, a wildlife conservationist who recently got promoted to director; and her 17-year-old sister Samantha (voiced by Sarah Grayson). Upon arriving, she finds the house deserted, much of their possessions still in moving boxes, and a note on the door from Sam imploring Katie not to investigate what happened.

Searching the house, Katie begins to piece together what happened during her absence. After moving in, Samantha found it difficult to adjust to her new high school, but eventually made friends with another girl, Yolanda "Lonnie" DeSoto, a JROTC cadet. The two bonded over Street Fighter, punk rock, grunge and the burgeoning riot grrrl movement, and after sneaking off to a concert, the two became romantically involved. After various incidents at school, Sam's parents found out about her relationship, forbade Sam to close her bedroom door while Lonnie was over, and went into denial that their daughter is a lesbian. As Lonnie was set to eventually ship out to begin her service, Sam was left distraught.

Two days after her farewell show, which coincides with the day of Katie's homecoming, and the week of Sam's parents going on a vacation (which is revealed to actually be a counseling trip instead of a camping trip, as they told others), Lonnie departed to her station, but eventually called Sam from a payphone to tell her that she got off the bus in Salem and she wanted them to be together. Sam's final journal entry to Katie explains that she packed up her things and took her car to find Lonnie, hoping to start a new life with her outside of Oregon. But she promises that she will one day see her again.

Optionally, Katie can find various other clues that provide information on additional events that happened during the time: it is implied that Janice was beginning to have romantic feelings towards a subordinate, and that Terry was berated by his father via letter about his failed writing work, as well as Sam and Lonnie's suspicion that the house was haunted by the deceased Oscar Masan, Terry's uncle and former owner of the house. It is also implied that Terry's decision to write about a character traveling back in time to 1963 to stop the Kennedy assassination may have been influenced by his own sexual abuse by Masan, which either occurred or ended in 1963, when he was 13 years old.

== Development ==
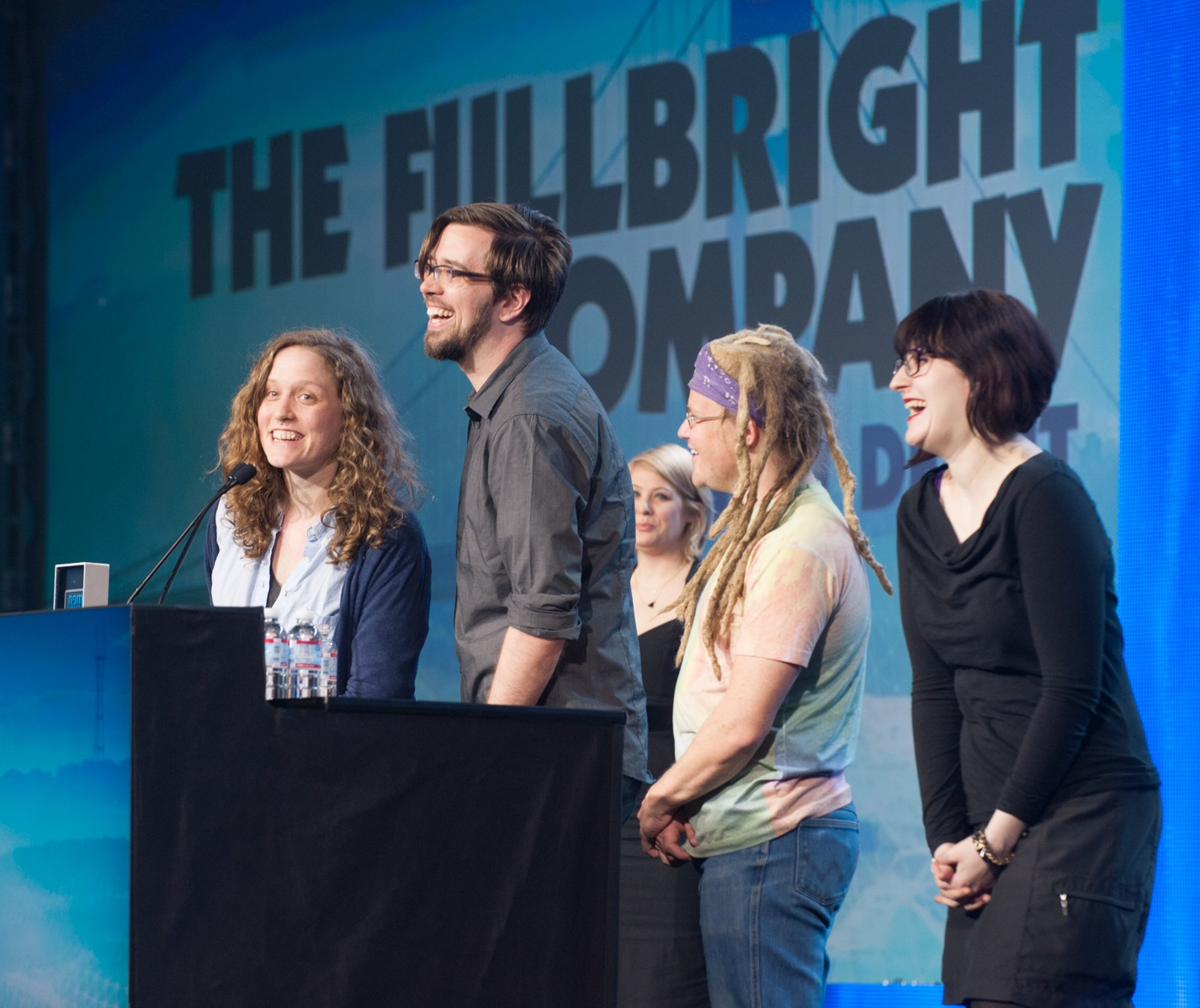
The Fullbright Company at the Game Developers Choice Awards in 2014. From left, Kate Craig, Steve Gaynor, Johnnemann Nordhagen and Karla Zimonja

Fullbright was founded by Steve Gaynor, Karla Zimonja, and Johnnemann Nordhagen as "The Fullbright Company". The three had previously worked together at 2K Games on BioShock 2: Minerva's Den. All three were drawn by the prospect of developing an exploration game influenced by Minerva's Den through a small independent team rather than a large company, and subsequently left 2K Games to form Fullbright. To reduce costs, the team moved into a house together in Portland, Oregon, and set up the office in the basement, with Gone Home being their first game. Gaynor considered their previous work on the BioShock games as effectively the pre-production stage for Gone Home, allowing them to complete it within seventeen months. The rapid development was aided by first prototyping the game in Amnesia: The Dark Descent's HPL Engine 2 (which Gaynor had prior experience with), before completing the game in the Unity 4 game engine. The game's budget was less than $200,000.

The initial concept for Gone Home was for the player to explore a smart house that included a central artificial intelligence running everything with robots running around to complete tasks. The player would have been able to change the state of the house through their actions; Gaynor compared this idea to a non-combative System Shock game. As they explored this idea, and recognizing the small size of their team, they considered what would change if they made the house more like a regular household without any other characters visibly present, which significantly simplified the development into something more manageable for the team. This created the focus of the game as being "no other people, no other characters, [just] you in a single environment". The reduced scope allowed them to complete the game with the three of them for programming, narrative, and 2D art assets, along with remote work from Kate Craig for the game's 3D modeling. Particularly, the smaller scope eliminated the need for any type of character modeler or animator. Craig's spouse E. M. Carroll, a comic artist whom Gaynor was a fan of, also assisted by designing some of the game's art asset and logos.

Narratively, Gone Home was designed around family; Gaynor had stated that for all the science fiction trappings of Minerva's Den, its core narrative was about a man, his wife, and how the man's past was affecting that relationship, and used the same approach for Gone Home. They placed the player as one of the members of the family to remove any type of morality of exploring a house that did not belong to them. Additionally, they established that the family had only recently moved into the home; Gaynor had worried that the player would have difficulty identifying key elements that would be present among all the other objects within a well lived-in home, while within a recent move, only objects of immediate importance would have been unpacked, making it easy for the player to focus on these. Fullbright set the game in 1995 because they considered it the most recent year in which technology had not made the majority of communication digital in nature, so that they did not have to account for how digital communication would affect their storytelling, while still keeping elements of the game familiar to players. Another source of inspiration was urban exploration, particularly Japanese haikyo, homes long abandoned due to industrialization. Gaynor said there were mysteries about its residents that people could put together from examining the state of the abandoned home.

Gaynor stated that Minerva's Den was more focused on environmental storytelling than action-driven gameplay, and set the approach and necessary design elements they needed for Gone Home. Other elements that informed Gone Home from their BioShock experience was non-linear levels to explore, and discovering narrative elements through audio logs that the player would have to actively seek out, both which supported the exploration elements of the game. Gaynor also considered the approach that Looking Glass Studios used for developing immersive sims. One challenge that Fullbright considered was that not every player would necessarily find every narrative clue for the various plot elements, and so it was necessary for them to make the story flexible enough that the player could understand these narratives without necessarily seeing every element they designed. Gaynor was aware this approach to a game would be considered unconventional, so they did not set out to make something avant-garde but instead more as a proof of concept that such games could be immersive to draw the player in to fully explore and come to understand the narrative themselves.

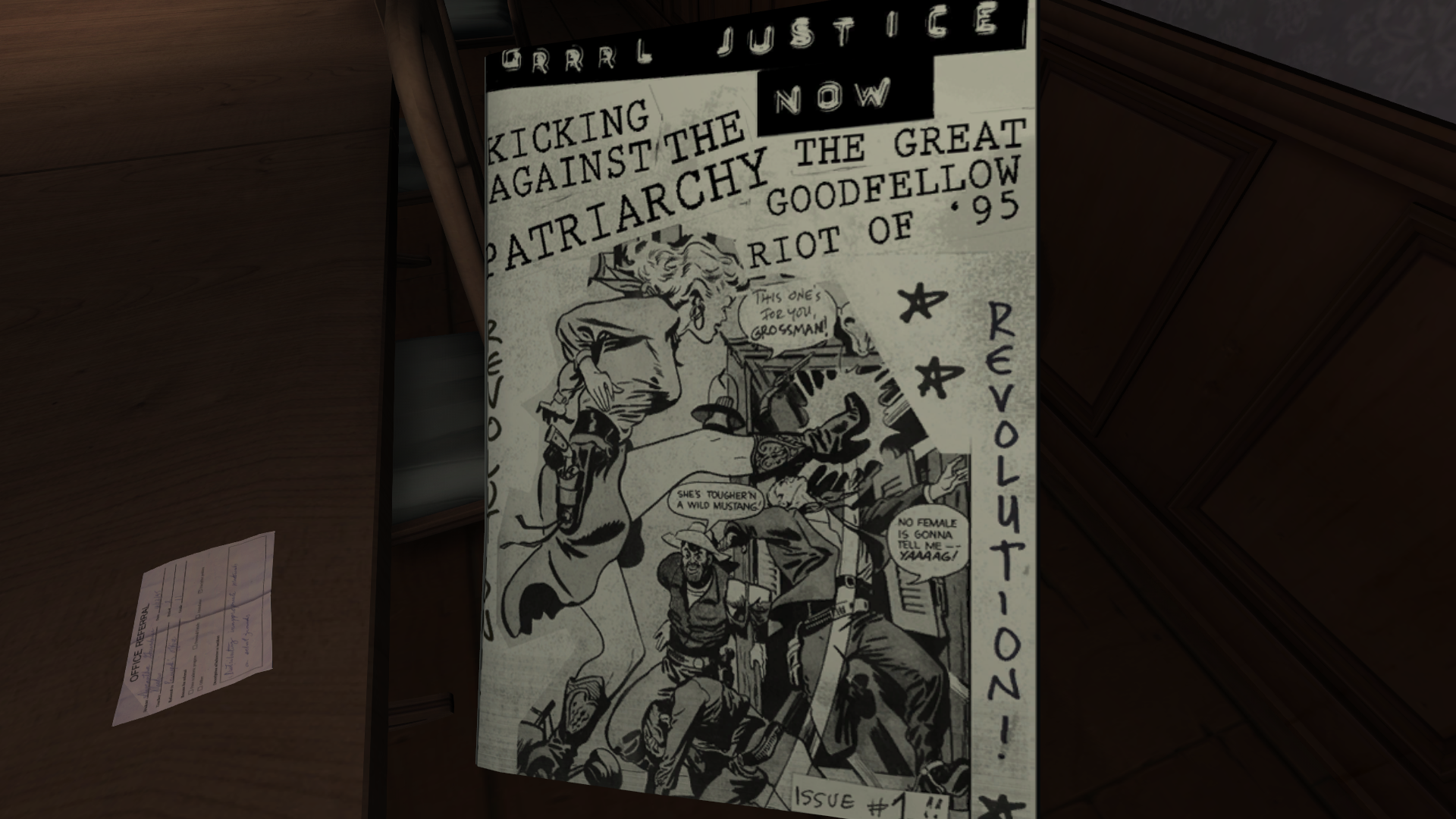
The player explores objects around the house to piece together the story. Much of the game's art is influenced by the riot grrrl movement of the mid-1990s.

The game features music from the riot grrrl bands Heavens to Betsy and Bratmobile; Fullbright knew of their Portland-based label Kill Rock Stars, and worked early on with them to secure the rights to the music once they had settled on the locale and time period. After showing the game at Grrrl Front Fest, a Portland riot grrrl music festival, it attracted the attention of a local band, The Youngins, who went on to provide the music for Girlscout, the fictional band in the game. The game's original musical score was composed by Chris Remo, Gaynor's friend and co-host from the Idle Thumbs podcast, and featuring over 30 minutes of music that accompany the game's main exploration gameplay, with unique music also scored to each of the game's audio logs.

A developer commentary mode was added as a free update to the game in October 2013.

=== Ports ===
A console version of the game was in development by Midnight City; however, this was later cancelled following Midnight City's closure in March 2015. Later, the development of the console port for PlayStation 4 and Xbox One were switched to Majesco, and were released on 12 January 2016. These ports included enhanced graphics and audio, and used the updated Unity 5 game engine.

Gone Home was released for the Nintendo Switch on 6 September 2018 through support of publisher Annapurna Interactive. The Switch version includes licensed Super Nintendo Entertainment System game cartridge artwork on in-game objects, replacing fictional cartridges used in other versions, as part of the game's collaboration with Nintendo. Celebrating the game's fifth anniversary, Annapurna Interactive, in collaboration with iam8bit, announced a limited physical release of the game for the Nintendo Switch, alongside a limited vinyl record release for the game's soundtrack, which launched in 2019.

== Reception ==
Reception

Aggregate scores
Aggregator	Score
Metacritic	PC: 86/100; PS4: 85/100; NS: 88/100
OpenCritic	85/100; 76% Critics Recommend

Review scores
Publication	Score
Adventure Gamers	4.5/5
Edge	9/10
Eurogamer	6/10
Game Informer	8.5/10
GameSpot	9.5/10
Giant Bomb	5/5
IGN	9.5/10
PC Gamer (US)	85/100
Polygon	10/10
Financial Post	10/10
The Daily Telegraph	4/5

Awards
Publication	Award
BAFTA	Best Debut Game (2013)
Polygon	Game of the Year (2013)

Gone Home received "generally favorable" reviews, according to review aggregator website Metacritic.

Emily Morganti for Adventure Gamers commented that Gone Home had a "realistic, engrossing story that's beautifully told through environmental clues and audio narration" and that "many people read books for the opportunity to see life through someone else's eyes, but it's rare for a game to do it as well as this one does." The Financial Post's Matthew Braga also noted that "This is a game that some will hold up as forward-thinking evidence in the ongoing debate of games-as-art", adding that the game was made to "plumb the depths of experience outside of gaming's typically targeted white, male, youthful core." However, Eurogamer editor Oli Welsh stated "The Fullbright Company has built a fine house for intimate storytelling in games, but it hasn't found the story to live in it yet."

The game's LGBT themes were praised. Fullbright reported receiving numerous feedback not only from LGBT players of the game that appreciated how they told the story and how such people have to do deal with rejection by their family, but also from players who had opposed LGBT rights who found the game presented the issues related to LGBT to change their mind on the subject. Fullbright also received some criticism from players for focusing on LGBT themes at the expense of other story elements. Due to statements made by the organizers of PAX Prime that Fullbright considered derogatory towards LGBT, the company pulled out of showing Gone Home at the Indie MEGABOOTH showcase during the 2013 PAX Prime event, stressing the importance of respecting LGBT issues. In the wake of this, PAX announced that it would establish Diversity Hubs at its future events for "attendees to find information related to issues surrounding women, LGBTQ, people of color, disabled people, and mental health issues in gaming".

Some reporters have considered the question of whether Gone Home should be considered a video game, as it lacks the normal interactivity one would normally have with a video game. Gaynor asserted that Gone Home was specifically developed for the video game medium, stating that they considered it an "edited discussion" between Fullbright and the player, as "[t]he content that you encounter appears differently than for someone else. It is unique to each user and their interpretation. The interactivity of it makes the experience unique to yourself." Gaynor used the example of the ability to turn lights on or off in any room in the house as an example of this. They included this interactivity as they had developed the game, they found that this gave a means for players to track if they had been within a room before or not, since the house starts otherwise dark, so he considered this one method by which they know what players would likely want to do and providing them means for them to do that, thus making the experience interactive. The lack of interactivity led to Gone Home to be called "walking simulator" at its release, though since then, the industry has come to accept "walking simulators" to describe similarly contemplative narrative games with little direct interactivity, like The Stanley Parable, Firewatch, and What Remains of Edith Finch. Gone Home's approach to exploratory storytelling was a point of influence for parts of Uncharted 4: A Thief's End and Prey. Polygon named Gone Home among the most important games of the 2010s for its unique approach of conveying plot through examining objects, and its focus on queer relationships.

Due to both the atypical nature of Gone Home and its narrative centered around LGBT issues, it became a central point of discussion at the onset of the Gamergate controversy in August 2014. A portion of video game players, some who supported the Gamergate movement, criticized games like Gone Home and Depression Quest for lacking the qualities of normal video games while earning praise from the gaming press, as well as including topics like LGBT issues. Critics countered that these elements are part of considering video games as an art form, demonstrating how the medium is changing.

=== Sales ===
By September 2013, Fullbright announced that the game had sold more than 50,000 copies. By February 2014, sales had reached 250,000 copies. By the time of release of Tacoma, Fullbright's second game released in October 2017, Gone Home had sold more than 700,000 copies.

=== Awards and accolades ===
The game was also nominated for "Excellence in Narrative" for the Independent Games Festival for 2013.

Polygon named Gone Home their Game of the Year for 2013.

Gone Home was nominated for several categories at the 2014 Game Developers Choice Awards, including "Game of the Year", "Innovation Award", "Best Narrative", and "Best Downloadable Game", while Fullbright won as a studio for "Best Debut" for Gone Home.

During the 17th Annual D.I.C.E. Awards, the Academy of Interactive Arts & Sciences nominated Gone Home for "Downloadable Game of the Year".

The game won the 2013 British Academy Games Awards for best "Debut Game" while nominated for "Best Story".
