= General assignment =

Concept in bankruptcy law

A general assignment or assignment is a concept in bankruptcy law in which an insolvent entity's assets are assigned to someone as an alternative to a bankruptcy. One form is an "assignment for the benefit of creditors", abbreviated ABC or AFBC.

== United States ==
In the United States, a general assignment or an assignment for the benefit of creditors is simply a contract whereby the insolvent entity ("assignor") transfers legal and equitable title, as well as custody and control of its property, to a third party ("assignee") in trust, to apply the proceeds of sale to the assignor's creditors in accord with priorities established by law.

An assignment for the benefit of creditors is a relatively well-established common law tool and is one alternative to a bankruptcy. An assignment for the benefit of creditors is designed to save time and expense by concluding the affairs of a bankrupt company. The assignment for the benefit of creditors is a state form of bankruptcy action versus a federal form of bankruptcy action. The assignment for the benefit of creditor's process is similar in character to a Chapter 7 bankruptcy and parallels some of the same procedures, but is not an actual "bankruptcy". The creditors do not get any input into the procedure and a court is not needed either, so the process is faster.

=== Mechanism ===
The assignment for the benefit of creditors is a common law contract between the board of directors and the assignee in which the board "assigns" the assets and liabilities of the company to the assignee, a third party. The assignment for the benefit of creditors contract is usually recorded the public record at a town, a city, a county or a state level. Each state will differ on recording requirements for the assignment for the benefit of creditors contract.

The physical filing of the assignment usually occurs after: the board of directors has spoken with local insolvency counsel; a board of directors authorization of some nature has been enacted; an appropriate assignee chosen; and the contract has been written. The assignee's primary goal is to try to make the creditors whole. The assignee performs duties similar to a trustee under federal bankruptcy. The assignee has a similar, if not equivalent, fiduciary role as the bankruptcy trustee. The assignee has the primary responsibility to: liquidate the assets of the company; vette creditor claims; and issue a dividend to the creditors. The creditors are the assignee's top priority, not shareholders. Shareholders by definition have a residual claim on assets once all creditors are satisfied.

The assignee, once the assignment process is completed, issues a dividend. The dividend is derived from the sale of assets, collection of receivables, recovery of the bankrupt company's assets and cash. Certain creditors may or may not receive a dividend. The assignee's hope is to provide a one-to-one redemption of the creditor's claims; however, this depends on the amount of cash an assignee can marshal in the liquidation process.

The claims process is similar to a standard bankruptcy action in which creditors submit claims to the assignee for review and acceptance. The acceptance and vetting of claims is an important process to ensure that no one creditor has overstated their claim. There are rare occasions in which an assignee may issue a non-cash dividend as part of the overall dividend to creditors on their claims, but a dividend of this type is not common. If all the creditors are made whole, shareholders would then have a claim on the remainder of the dividend. This holds true only if there are no other classes of equity that have priority senior to the shareholders.

The order of creditor's claims usually follows the normal bankruptcy order prescribed in a Chapter 7 bankruptcy, generally secured, and unsecured in descending order. The assignee, depending on the specific state law may use Chapter 7, Title 11, United States Code as needed. Neither the federal bankruptcy court nor a state court usually oversee this process, however the assignee is subject in most cases to a look back provision within the state the assignment took place.

A Federal Bankruptcy Court judge in a Chapter 7 bankruptcy must approve the sale of the bankrupt company's assets, thus adding time and expense on to the entire liquidation process. The assets sold in an assignment for the benefit of creditor process do not usually require a judge's intervention. It is this removal of the court from the liquidation process which increases the speed of the assets sold in an assignment process. This is one substantial difference from a regular bankruptcy.

=== Creditors ===
Secured and unsecured creditors constitute the creditor body. Both secured and unsecured creditors are ahead of shareholders as noted earlier. A secured creditor is a creditor, who has a priority claim on an asset or assets of a company. A lien on the specific asset or assets places the secured creditor's claim ahead of the unsecured creditor. Once a secured creditor is satisfied, the unsecured creditor is then the next priority. This is again the normal order of priority in a bankruptcy.

=== Secured creditor influence ===
If there has been a determination by company management and interested parties such as a secured creditor that even after restructuring, a "going concern" may still not be viable, a secured creditor or group of secured creditors frequently may encourage the company's senior management to pursue this liquidation mechanism. Secured creditor(s) may encourage this type of action to relieve themselves of the legal costs and risks associated with the foreclosure and sale of its collateral. One specific risk a secured creditor wants to avoid is preference or the perception of preference in the liquidation process (see fraudulent transfer).

In situations where the liquidation value of the assets exceeds a secured creditor's lien, the assignee is not normally required to obtain the consent of a secured creditor or any other creditor prior to the assignment process. Cooperation of the secured creditor may however affect the assignee's ability to liquidate an asset. An assignee in practice may obtain the consent of the secured creditors in advance of the assignment to ensure that the assignee can liquidate the asset or assets in a timely manner without a secured party stopping or holding up the assignment process. Secured party consent in this case is optional, not necessary.

In situations where the liquidation value of the assets is less than a secured creditor's lien, the assignment process can be done, however a vast number of legal questions need to be reconciled before the assignment process can possibly be initiated. There unfortunately is no concise answer in this particular situation.

Secured creditors may in certain instances assume the senior management roles within the bankrupt company, however noted earlier this situation occurs when the secured creditor(s) have foreclosed on their lien. Large secured creditors again may influence the decision making process, but that secured creditor can not enter into that contract on behalf of the bankrupt company. Only the bankrupt company's senior management and/or board of directors have the power to do an assignment.

=== Dividend ===
The dividend is hopefully the payout that the assignee issues, once all creditors' claims have been vetted and all the assets have been sold. The assignee hopes to generate enough cash to provide a one for one redemption of a creditor's claims. This is the hope the reality varies vastly, depending on the price the assets fetched when sold. Most dividends are in the form of cash back to the creditor, but not necessarily all. There may not even be a dividend in certain instance, thus no creditor receives any payment. There is no way to determine the cash value of an asset in the assignment process, regardless of past estimates. Tangible assets cash value can usually, but not always, be reasonably estimated. Intangible assets such as intellectual property or processes are much more difficult to evaluate.

=== Key attributes of the process ===
Noted earlier this is a state form of bankruptcy, not federal form. The assignment process or any bankruptcy process for that matter is a legal matter. The state attributes of an assignment process may be understood by any attorney however a local/regional bankruptcy attorney in the specific state usually is best equipped to handle the legal end of the process for the company making the assignment. This is not asserted to diminish an attorney's capabilities, but to stress the legal niche that this legal instrument falls within, bankruptcy. Non legal staff familiar with bankruptcy and the assignment process can also affect the speed validity of the process.

=== General assignment attributes ===
The general rule is that any debtor may make an assignment. This would include any individual, partnership, corporation or limited liability company that owes anything to anyone. Any debtor owning property has the common law right to make an assignment.

== Other common law countries ==
In other common law countries, general assignments usually refer to any general assignment of existing or future book debts by a natural person (including, in some cases, partnerships). A general assignment made by a natural person who is subsequently adjudged bankrupt is void against the trustee in bankruptcy as regards any book debts which have not been paid prior to the presentation of the bankruptcy petition.

The definition of book debts includes "debts which in the ordinary course of business would be entered in a well-kept trade book", future debts and future rents under a hire purchase agreement. Bills of exchange also fall within the definition of book debts, but a bank balance does not.

Under (for example) English law, any general assignment, either absolute or by way of security, of book debts is void unless registered under the Bills of Sale Act 1878. A trustee would not be able to attack an assignment under this section which relates to debts due from specified debtors or debts becoming due under specified contracts or where the debts were assigned as part of a bona fide transfer of a business or the assignment is for the benefit of creditors generally.
