= Chuck Jordan (game designer) =

American video game designer

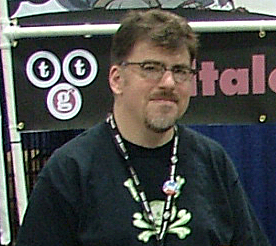
- Chuck Jordan at Comic-Con in 2007
- Born: Charles Jordan; June 27, 1971 (age 55); United States
- Occupations: Game designer, writer, programmer
- Years active: 1997–present

Charles "Chuck" Jordan is an American game designer, writer, and programmer. He co-wrote The Curse of Monkey Island, co-wrote three episodes of Sam & Max Save the World, was the lead writer and co-designer of Sam & Max Beyond Time and Space, designed and co-wrote two episodes of Strong Bad's Cool Game for Attractive People, and was the designer of Sam & Max: The Devil's Playhouse: The Penal Zone, as well as season lead designer for the Sam & Max: The Devil's Playhouse season on the whole.

== Career ==
Chuck Jordan began his career at LucasArts as a programmer and co-writer of The Curse of Monkey Island in 1997. After working on Grim Fandango as a script programmer, he left the company.

Later he joined Infinite Machine, a start-up company founded by LucasArts alumni. At Infinite Machine, he worked on the initial design of games including the cancelled Sam & Max Plunge Through Space.

After Infinite Machine closed, he joined Telltale Games as a writer and designer in 2007. While at Telltale, he co-wrote several episodes for their adventure game seasons. In 2008, he was the lead writer and co-designer of Sam & Max Beyond Time & Space. He also wrote and co-directed the first episode of that season, Penal Zone, and wrote and designed the finale The City That Dares Not Sleep. He finished his tenure at Telltale Games as season lead designer of Sam & Max: The Devil's Playhouse in 2010. Jordan also wrote Puzzle Agent 2. Puzzle Agent 2 released in 2011, one year after his departure from Telltale.

== Ludography ==
Year	Title	Role	Developer	Notes
1997	The Curse of Monkey Island	Programmer, co-writer	LucasArts	
1998	Grim Fandango	Script programmer	LucasArts	
2002	New Legends	Designer	Infinite Machine	
2003	SimCity 4	Programmer	Electronic Arts	
2007	Sam & Max Save the World	Writer	Telltale Games	Episodic game; "Abe Lincoln Must Die!", "Reality 2.0", "Bright Side of the Moon" only
2008	Sam & Max Beyond Time and Space	Lead writer, co-designer	Telltale Games	
2008	Strong Bad's Cool Game for Attractive People	Designer, co-writer	Telltale Games	Episodic game; "Strong Badia the Free", "8-bit is Enough" only
2010	Sam & Max: The Devil's Playhouse	Lead writer, co-designer	Telltale Games	Episodic game; Writer, co-director for "The Penal Zone"; Writer, designer for "The City That Dares Not Sleep"
2011	Puzzle Agent 2	Writer	Telltale Games	
2012	The Walking Dead	Story consultant, writer	Telltale Games	
2014	Tales From the Borderlands	Writer	Telltale Games	
2021	Sasquatchers	Designer, Programmer, Writer		Released as part of the Playdate's Season 1 of games.
