= Graham Annable =

Canadian cartoonist and animator

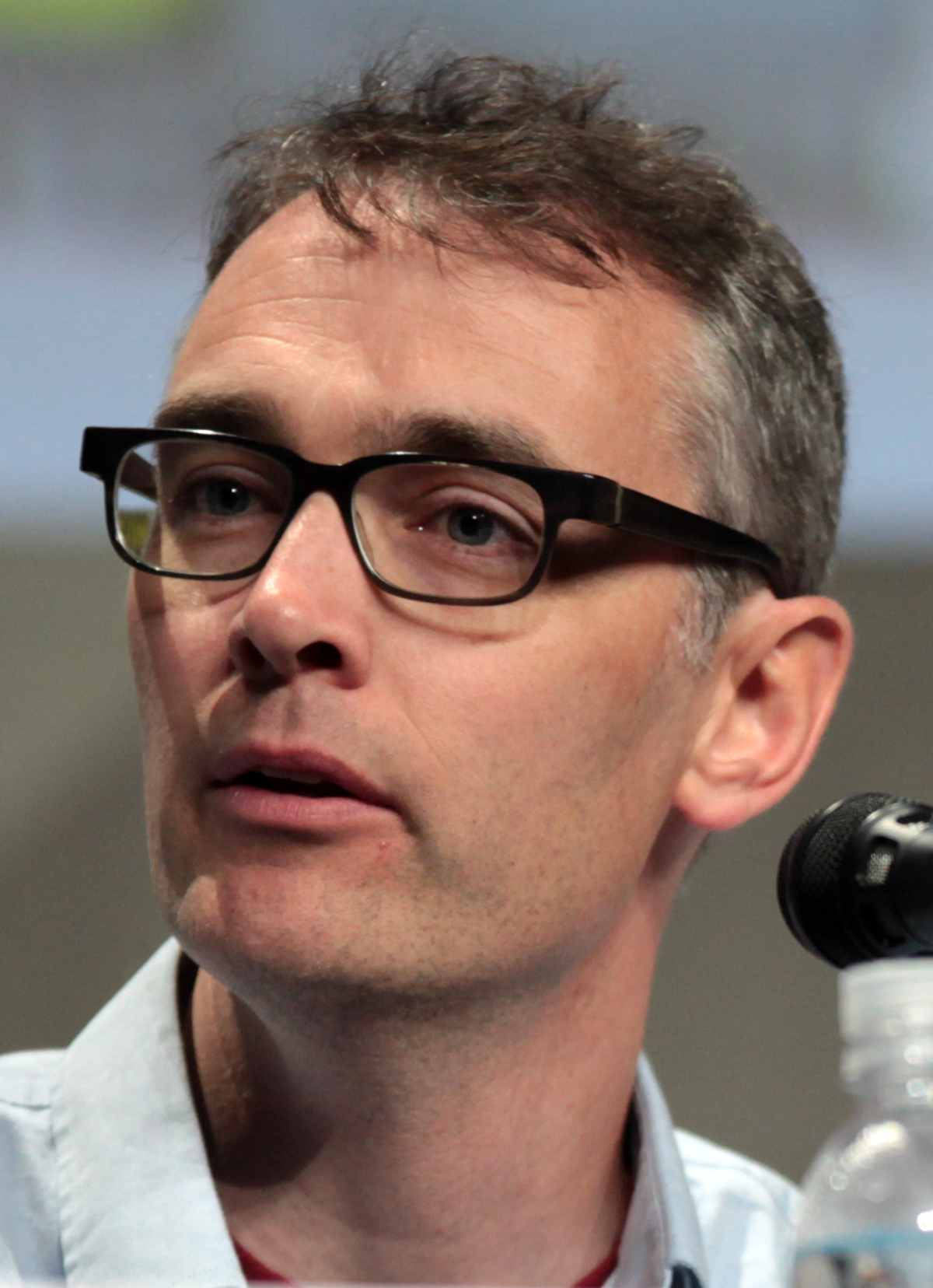
- Annable at the 2014 San Diego Comic-Con
- Born: June 1, 1970 (age 56) Sault Ste. Marie, Ontario, Canada
- Areas: Cartoonist, Penciller
- Notable works: Grickle; Hickee; The Boxtrolls

Graham Annable (born June 1, 1970) is a Canadian cartoonist and animator. He is the creator of Grickle, published by Alternative Comics, and one of the founders of the Hickee humor anthology (also published by Alternative Comics). Annable has created works for the television, film, video game, and comic book industries.

== Life and career ==
Annable was born in Sault Ste. Marie, Ontario, Canada. After graduating from Sheridan College in Oakville, Ontario, where he was classically trained as an animator, Annable ended up at LucasArts. He worked there for ten years, starting in 1994 on Full Throttle and ultimately as a lead animator on the cancelled Sam & Max: Freelance Police. In addition, Annable has done illustration and cartoon work for (among others) Chuck Jones, Nickelodeon, and Walt Disney Productions. Annable was employed as creative director at Telltale Games during their first year, and continued working closely with them on other projects, including designing Puzzle Agent and its sequel.

He moved to Portland to work as a story artist on Coraline. He co-directed Laika's 3D stop-motion/CGI animated feature film The Boxtrolls (2014) which was nominated for the Academy Award for Best Animated Feature.

== Published work ==
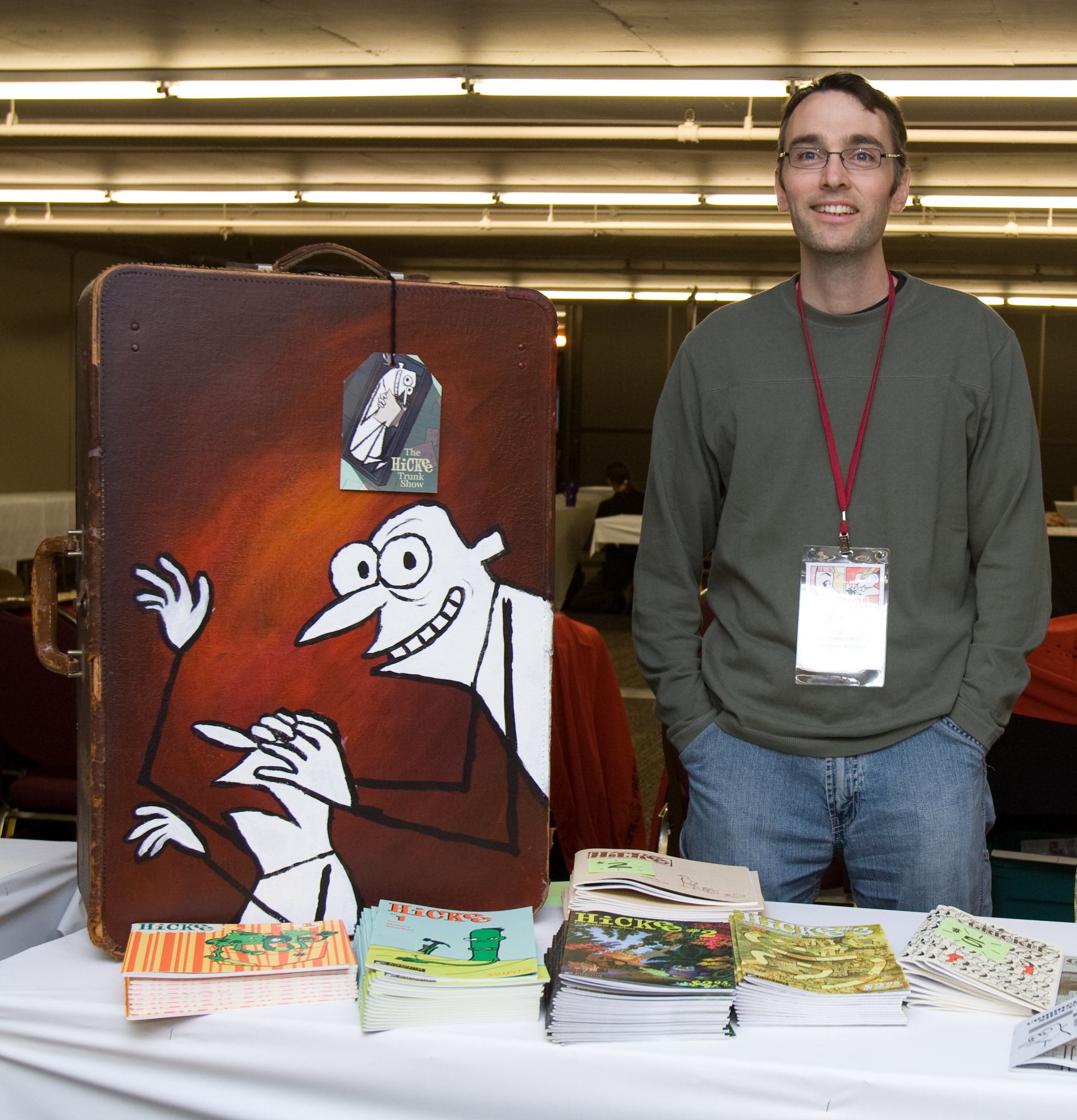
Annable at the 2007 Stumptown Comics Fest in Portland, Oregon, selling Hickee comics.

- Grickle (Alternative Comics, 2001, ISBN 978-1-891867-01-9)
- Further Grickle (Alternative Comics, 2003, ISBN 978-1-891867-55-2)
- Hickee (contributor) (Alternative Comics, 2003, ISBN 978-1-891867-42-2)
- Hickee volume 2, #2 (contributor) (Alternative Comics, 2004, ISBN 978-1-891867-76-7)
- Stickleback 2005 (Alternative Comics, 2005, ISBN 978-1-891867-80-4)
- Project: Superior (contributor) (AdHouse Books, 2005, ISBN 978-0-9721794-8-5)
- Hickee volume 3, #4 (contributor) (Alternative Comics, 2008, ISBN 978-1-934460-05-4)
- Flight Volume Five: Evidence (contributor) (Villard Books, 2008, ISBN 0-345-50589-1)
- Nelson Tethers: Puzzle Agent (designer) (Telltale Games, 2010)
- The Book of Grickle (Diamond Books, 2010, ISBN 9781595824301)
- Puzzle Agent 2 (designer) (Telltale Games, 2011)
- Peter & Ernesto: A Tale of Two Sloths (First Second, 2018, ISBN 978-1-626-72561-4)
- Peter & Ernesto: The Lost Sloths (First Second, 2019, ISBN 9781626725720)
- Peter & Ernesto: Sloths in the Night (First Second, 2020, ISBN 9781250211309)
- First Ever Graham Annable Doodle Collection (Odd Dog Entertainment, 2021, ISBN 978-1-7777257-0-9)
- Second Delightful Graham Annable Doodle Collection (Odd Dog Entertainment, 2022, ISBN 978-1-7777257-1-6)
- Eerie Tales From the School of Screams (First Second, 2023, ISBN 9781250195036)

== Filmography ==
- A Goofy Movie (1995) clean up artist: Phoenix Animation Toronto
- Coraline (2009) storyboard artist
- ParaNorman (2012) storyboard artist
- The Boxtrolls (2014) co-director
- Kubo and the Two Strings (2016) storyboard artist
- Missing Link (2019) additional story artist
- Guillermo del Toro's Pinocchio (2022) story artist

== Awards ==
- 2002 Harvey Award nominee for Best New Talent.
- 2015 Academy Award nominee for The Boxtrolls.
