= Saturnalia (video game) =

2022 video game

- Developer: Santa Ragione
- Publisher: Santa Ragione
- Director: Pietro Righi Riva
- Writers: Chris Remo; Federico Corbetta Caci; Nick Breckon
- Composers: Michael Manning; Nicolò Sala
- Engine: Unity
- Platforms: Microsoft Windows; PlayStation 4; PlayStation 5; Xbox One; Xbox Series X/S; MacOS; Nintendo Switch
- Release: October 27, 2022
- Mode: Single-player

Saturnalia is a survival horror video game developed and published by the Italian studio Santa Ragione, and released for Microsoft Windows, PlayStation 4, PlayStation 5, Xbox One, Xbox Series X/S and Nintendo Switch on October 27, 2022. It is the first Italian game to be created with the support of the Sardegna Film Commission. This morbid jigsaw puzzle is available on Nintendo Switch, PC, PlayStation 4, PlayStation 5, Xbox One, Xbox Series X|S.

The game has been described as a neon-folk horror game.

== Gameplay ==
Saturnalia is a survival horror adventure game presented in a third-person view that incorporates roguelike mechanics into the main gameplay. The player controls one of the four available characters – Anita, Sergio, Claudia and Paul – through a Sardinian village where an ancient ritual has been held and a mysterious creature is on the loose. The roguelike element is represented by Gravoi, the village where the game takes place, which reshuffles its configuration each time all the characters are lost.

== Development ==
The concept of setting the game in Sardinia was decided early in development as "...the Island rifes of folklore, different cultures stratifications, stories and masks. Also, it was never used before in a videogame, and we thought that it could work as an element of identity for Saturnalia, something that would make it immediately recognizable"

The game visuals feature a 'sketched' character style and animations inspired by stop-motion and rotoscoping film techniques, with influences from the 1970s giallo Italian movies. and Italian comics by Sergio Bonelli Editore.

== Release ==
The game was released on October 27, 2022, on the Epic Games Store with a year-long standard exclusivity deal. It was free for the first week of release.

=== Post-release ===
Announced during the Indie Horror Showcase Livestream, Saturnalia is coming to Steam on November 8, 2023, with additional new features such as a first-person and a hybrid third person-first person mode, a photo mode, new accessibility options and a black-and-white film noir filter. A 40-minute demo is currently available on Steam.

== Reception ==
Reception

Aggregate score
Aggregator	Score
Metacritic	PC: 80/100; PS5: 72/100; XONE: 78/100

Review scores
Publication	Score
Edge	8/10
Eurogamer	4/5 stars
IGN	7/10

Saturnalia received "generally favorable" reviews, according to review aggregator platform Metacritic.

Edge praised the roguelike mechanic and disquieting mood, writing "[But] The knowledge that on our next visit Gravoi will be unknowable once more is a major reason why this disquieting, disorienting place leaves us as properly rattled as we've been by a video game since Immortality".

IGN Italia felt that "Saturnalia works more as a conceptual idea and visual level than on a strictly playful one, but it is an imbalance that does not excessively affect the pleasure of the experience."

Rock Paper Shotgun appreciated "its character and location design in the style of a giallo movie but isn't trying to be either of them - which means Saturnalia ends up feeling more cinematic and theatrical than games that try much harder to do so."
