= Firewatch =

2016 adventure video game

- Artwork by Olly Moss, depicting a fire lookout in the Shoshone National Forest
- Developer: Campo Santo
- Publishers: Panic; Campo Santo
- Directors: Olly Moss; Sean Vanaman
- Producers: Gabe McGill; Jane Ng
- Artists: Jane Ng; Olly Moss
- Composer: Chris Remo
- Engine: Unity
- Platforms: Windows; Linux; OS X; PlayStation 4; Xbox One; Nintendo Switch
- Release: February 9, 2016: 'PC, Linux, Mac OS, PS4; WW: February 9, 2016 XB1; NA: September 21, 2016; EU: September 30, 2016; AU: October 14, 2016 NSW; WW: December 17, 2018
- Genres: Adventure; Walking simulator
- Mode: Single-player

Firewatch is a 2016 adventure game developed by Campo Santo and published by the developer in partnership with Panic. The game was released in February 2016 for Windows, Linux, OS X, PlayStation 4, followed by Xbox One in September 2016, and Nintendo Switch in December 2018. The story follows a fire lookout named Henry who works in Shoshone National Forest in Wyoming. Henry interacts with his supervisor Delilah using a walkie-talkie, choosing what to say from dialogue options, and developing his relationship with her. Over the course of the summer, Henry and Delilah are menaced by unseen forces and have to unravel a years-old mystery.

The game was directed by Olly Moss and Sean Vanaman, written by Chris Remo, Jake Rodkin, Moss and Vanaman, and produced by Gabe McGill and artist Jane Ng. The game's environment was modeled by Ng, based on a single painting by Moss. The design draws inspiration from New Deal advertisements by the National Park Service and field research conducted in Yosemite National Park.

The game received generally positive reviews, earning praise for its story, characters, dialogue, and visual style, but the presence of technical issues and the game's ending were both subjects of criticism. Firewatch won the award for Best 3D Visual Experience at the Unity Awards 2016, Best Indie game at the 2016 Golden Joystick Awards, Best Narrative at the 2017 Game Developers Choice Awards and Debut Game at the 2017 British Academy Games Awards. By 2018, the game had sold over 2.5 million copies.

== Gameplay ==
Henry interacts with Delilah using his walkie-talkie.

Firewatch is an adventure game played from a first-person view that takes place in the American state of Wyoming in 1989. Like other walking simulator games, Firewatch features no combat or puzzles. The player takes on the role of Henry, a fire lookout in Shoshone National Forest. Through exploration of the surrounding area, Henry uncovers clues about mysterious occurrences in the vicinity that are related to the ransacking of his tower while he is out on a routine patrol and a shadowy figure that occasionally appears watching him from afar. To aid in navigation, the player has a compass and a map that Henry appends additional information to throughout the game.

Henry's only means of communication is a walkie-talkie connecting him to his supervisor, Delilah. Delilah tasks the player with minor duties, such as checking in on campers setting off fireworks, and engages him in conversation. The player may choose from a number of dialogue options to speak with her upon the discovery of new interactive objects or environments, or can choose not to answer at all. The player's choices will influence the tone of Henry's relationship with Delilah. As the story progresses, new areas open up for the player, and certain plot points take place on particular days. Scattered supply caches contain objects like ropes that Henry can use to access new areas. Other objects found in the wilderness can be kept in the inventory for later use, including a disposable camera that players can take snapshots with.

Upon completion of the game, players unlock a free roam mode that allows players to explore the map with no objectives and a day-night cycle. A developer commentary mode adds listening stations scattered across the map with cassettes that provide players with behind-the-scenes information.

== Plot ==
In the spring of 1989, after his wife Julia (Larissa Gallagher) develops early-onset dementia, Henry (Rich Sommer) takes a job as a fire lookout in Shoshone National Forest in Wyoming. On his first day, Delilah (Cissy Jones), a lookout in another watchtower, contacts him via walkie-talkie and asks him to investigate illegal fireworks by the lake. Henry discovers a pair of teenage girls, who accuse him of leering. On his way back to his tower, he comes across a locked cave and spots a shadowy figure watching him. He returns to his watchtower to find it ransacked. The next day, Delilah asks Henry to investigate a downed communication line, which he finds cut. Henry and Delilah plot to scare the teenage girls off, but Henry finds their campsite ransacked and abandoned. The teens are reported missing; fearing an inquiry, Delilah falsely reports neither she nor Henry encountered the girls.

While out hiking, Henry finds an old backpack and a disposable camera belonging to a boy named Brian Goodwin, who was the son of former lookout Ned (Mac Brandt). Ned was an outdoorsman who drank heavily due to traumatic experiences in the Vietnam War, while Brian enjoyed fantasy novels and role-playing games. Though it is against the rules for employees to bring their children to the towers, Delilah was fond of Brian and lied about his presence. He and Ned apparently left abruptly and never returned.

A few months later, a small wildfire breaks out south of Henry's tower. Henry discovers a radio and a clipboard while fishing, with notes including transcripts of his conversations with Delilah. He is knocked unconscious by an unseen assailant and wakes up to find the clipboard and radio gone. In a nearby meadow, Henry finds a fenced-off government research area. He breaks in and discovers surveillance equipment and typewritten reports detailing his and Delilah's conversations and private lives. He also discovers a tracking device and takes it with him. Disturbed by this discovery, Henry and Delilah discuss destroying the government camp but decide against it. However, as Henry hikes home, someone sets fire to the camp.

The next day, Henry uses the tracking device to find a backpack with a key to the locked cave. Delilah reports a figure in Henry's tower; when Henry arrives, he finds a Walkman taped to the door with an incriminating recording of Henry and Delilah's discussion about destroying the government camp. The next day, someone impersonating Henry calls another lookout and claims Delilah knows the cause of the camp fire, putting her and Henry more on edge.

Henry uses the found key to enter the cave but is locked inside. Heading deeper into the cave, Henry discovers the decayed body of Brian Goodwin. Henry finds a way to the surface and reports Brian's death to Delilah, who is upset by the news. The next day, an evacuation order is given for all the lookouts, as the wildfire has grown out of control.

As Henry prepares to leave, the tracking device begins beeping. He follows the signal and discovers a tape recorded by Ned Goodwin, who has been the figure watching Henry. Ned claims Brian's death was accidental and that the boy fell due to climbing inexperience. Unwilling to return to society after Brian's death, Ned secretly lived in the area ever since. Choosing to venture deeper into the wilderness, Ned warns Henry not to look for him.

Henry finds Ned's camp filled with items stolen from the government camp, the lookout towers, and the teenage girls, who Delilah confirms have been found safe. The government camp was simply studying wildlife; Ned created and placed transcripts there to scare Henry away. Ned vanishes into the flames of the forest, unable to return to society after his son's death. Delilah blames Ned for Brian's death and leaves on the rescue helicopter. Henry goes to her tower, and he and Delilah say their goodbyes via radio before Henry evacuates, as the forest falls apart.

== Development ==
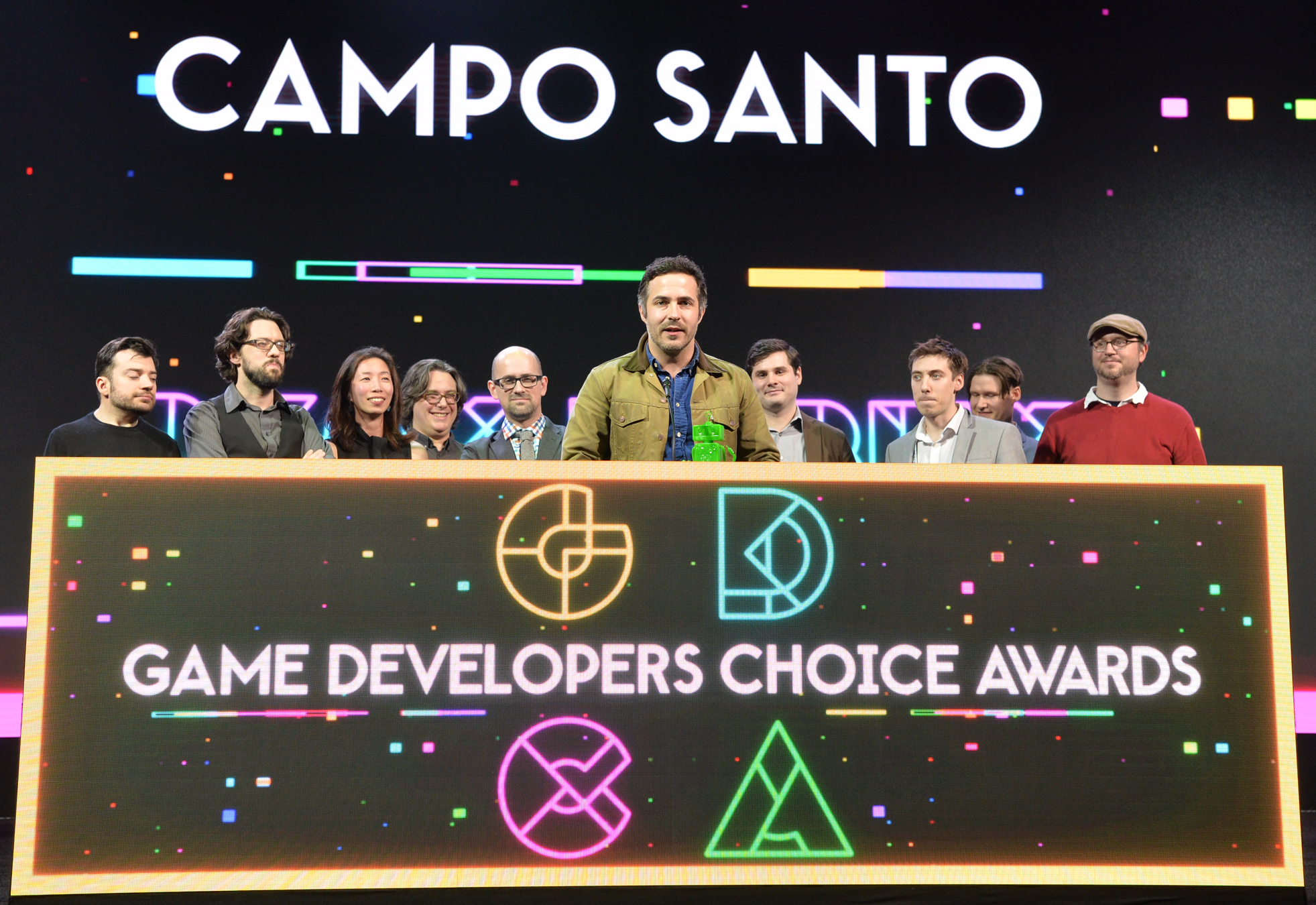
Members of Campo Santo at the Game Developers Choice Awards in 2017

Firewatch is the first game by Campo Santo and was created by Jake Rodkin and Sean Vanaman, who were the creative leads on The Walking Dead; Nels Anderson, the lead designer of Mark of the Ninja; and artist Olly Moss. Chris Remo was involved in many aspects of the design and also composed the score. In total, the game involved 11 people—eight in-house developers and three remote workers.

Development for Firewatch began with a single painting by Moss. Moss, who had previously been known primarily for his graphic design work, had joined Vanaman and Rodkin to found Campo Santo after spending many years working on the periphery of game development. In creating the painting, Moss emulated National Park Service posters from the New Deal era in art direction and bold colors. The development team went on a camping trip to Yosemite National Park to find inspiration for the game, where they visited a lookout tower built with the same design as its video game counterpart. Further inspiration for the game came from Vanaman and Anderson's experiences growing up in rural Wyoming. Jane Ng, lead environmental artist at Campo Santo, was tasked with translating Moss' work into 3D environments while maintaining his stylized artistic vision.

Firewatch runs on the Unity game engine. Because the game featured a single open world instead of discrete levels, the developers split the main scene file into smaller scenes that could be stitched back together during play; splitting the map up by discipline (art, design, lighting) allowed concurrent changes and reduced development time. Ng created 23 kinds of trees, which were reused thousands of times throughout the game. To give distant foliage the simpler look of Moss's style, the game uses a custom shader. The in-game fire lookout towers were built in accordance with government specifications, using standard lumber size, after Ng's first attempt was unsatisfactory. The developers tried to prevent the forest from feeling like a series of corridors or linear paths, balancing the sensation of wandering in the woods, without actually dealing with the frustration of getting lost. Gullies, rocks, or other terrain features were added to break up sightlines so that as the player traveled they could not see areas of the world that had not yet loaded in. Lower-resolution representations of the world were used in cases where the player could see but not travel to an area for better performance.

The walkie-talkie interaction in Firewatch is inspired by the relationship in BioShock between the player character and Atlas, as well as the dialogue system from The Walking Dead.At one point in the development, it was intended that the protagonist would be able to communicate with multiple characters, such as hikers, but the idea was discarded due to its expense and the schedule requirements with which the team were working. The team avoided lip syncing and minimized the amount of character animation needed due to the limited team size and resources.

Anderson recalled that the constraints of the walking simulator/narrative exploration genre meant additional challenges. While the developers originally wanted the player to find equipment or gear that opened new paths through the wilderness like a Metroidvania, the realities of how dialogue would change if events happened out of order caused them to drastically cut back on optional exploration. Because the events of the game happened concurrently with the player exploring the wilderness, the developers could not rely on the usual options of relying heavily on notes or manmade objects to communicate information to the player, lest it disrupt suspension of disbelief. Likewise Delilah could not inform the player of events she could not see from her vantage point, and repeating information to make sure players registered it could break immersion in the story. Playtesting the game and identifying issues was difficult; playtesters had to play through large chunks of the game to have the context needed to evaluate it. If testers had issues, it was difficult to figure out where the problem lay. As a result, the developers had to build the game roughly in linear story order. Anderson recalled that a benefit of this arduous process was they had more time to change later parts of the game based on unexpected tester actions, and rerecording dialogue with the voice actors in their home studios was comparatively quick.

Vanaman called the characters of Delilah and Henry "version[s] of me", stating that it made it easy to write them from a place of familiarity. The developers cast Cissy Jones, who appeared in The Walking Dead, as the voice of Delilah in 2014. It took longer to find a voice actor for Henry whom the developers felt jibed with Jones; they ultimately cast Rich Sommer. Jones and Sommer recorded their lines in separate studios, but while on conference calls with each other to achieve a more natural rapport. The actors decided not to meet during production to maintain the distance between their characters.

The game's opening chapter features the song "Push Play" from Joy Chun and Nate Bosley's 2014 synthwave album Let's Get Electric, which depicts a fictitious 1980s synthpop act known as Cheap Talk. Taylor Dayne's "Tell It to My Heart" was used as a placeholder in the scene, but Vanaman conceded that the song was too overwhelming and would cost too much to license. Upon the realization that it would also be too costly to commission a song, Remo sought a song in the style of the 1980s by an unsigned, independent artist, leading to the use of "Push Play". The score features a combination of electric and acoustic guitar, bass and electric piano, with samples of Fender Rhodes as a substitute for the actual piano. Remo played all of the instruments himself.

== Analysis ==
The term "walking simulator" was originally used disparagingly for games like Dear Esther, Proteus and Gone Home that focused on slow-paced exploration without many of the traditional trappings of video games, including action sequences or fail states. Firewatch differs from many of these games by offering two-way communication that the player has (partial) control over, and in the depth of its dialogue trees.

A major theme of the game is isolation and loneliness. Firewatch puts heavy emphasis on the remoteness of the setting and prioritizing letting players navigate the game world. The topographical map that Henry uses to navigate differs sharply from usual video game maps, which are often persistent features of the head-up display. Rather, the game map is a physical item Henry manipulates, giving players a sense of accomplishment from successful navigation.

Critics noted the game blends genres, with Iwaniuk calling Firewatch a "non-genre game", with one of the positives of the game being that it left players unsure of which direction the game was going to go. Multiple critics noted that the game flirted with elements of horror and thrillers, with PC Gamer's Phil Savage noting that the tension is entirely created by thriller conventions and player expectations. From the start, Delilah is presented as a possibly untrustworthy character, and even innocuous exchanges are filtered through Henry's—and the player's—paranoia. Objects found in the first part of the game suggest more sinister events than ultimately occur. Samantha Webb and Réka Törzsök consider Firewatch a game that grapples with player agency and the illusion of control; throughout the game, the player is able to pick dialogue or make choices that inform the character, but cannot affect the game's ending.

Melissa Kagen considers Henry a "hypermasculine" character who fails at exercising said values; starting with the game's prologue, Henry is unable to protect his wife from danger or properly care for her when she is sick. Dialogue choices and limiting forceful responses to situations make the player have to play more contemplatively. The ending lacking the accomplishment of a more masculine-coded game—Delilah is a princess Henry does not save—forces players to confront the masculinity they have performed. In comparison, Bee Wertheimer, writing for The A.V. Club, felt the game still was a male fantasy given that the female characters have less agency than Henry.

== Release ==
The game was announced in March 2014, with a tentative release date of 2015 for Linux, Mac and Windows platforms, and console versions being explored. At GDC, Campo Santo housed a public playtest, and Ng hosted a panel on the design and aesthetic of the game entitled "The Art of Firewatch". The game released on February 9, 2016, for Linux, Mac, Windows, and PlayStation 4. An Xbox One version was later released in North America on September 21, 2016, featuring the audio tour and free roam modes. Due to ratings issues, this version was delayed in Europe until September 30 and in Australia and New Zealand until October 14.

Firewatch was made compatible with PlayStation 4 Pro in November 2016, with enhanced performance through 4K resolution and high-dynamic-range imaging. The additional game modes from the Xbox version also came to the PlayStation and PC versions. Partnering with Limited Run Games, Campo Santo produced a batch of physical PlayStation copies. The game was announced for the Nintendo Switch in 2018, with some exclusive elements, alongside optimizations that would appear on other platforms. The Nintendo Switch version was released on December 17, 2018.

=== Sales ===
Firewatch was a commercial success. It was the top-selling title on the Steam PC charts on release, and stayed in the top 10 for one week. It sold more than 500,000 copies within a month of release, and over one million copies in its first year. Firewatch sold over 2.5 million copies across all platforms by 2018.

== Reception ==
Reception

Aggregate score
Aggregator	Score
Metacritic	PC: 81/100; PS4: 76/100; XONE: 85/100; NS: 87/100

Review scores
Publication	Score
Destructoid	8/10
Game Informer	7.75/10
GameSpot	7/10
GamesRadar+	4.5/5
IGN	9.3/10
Polygon	8.5/10

Firewatch was a critical success and received "generally favorable" reviews, according to review aggregator website Metacritic. Justin Towell of GamesRadar+ wrote that Firewatch was "one of the most enthralling slices of entertainment I've ever experienced", while GameSpot's Scott Butterworth called it a "thoughtful, engrossing experience". Phil Iwaniuk, writing for PCGamesN, felt that while other games can fail to impart a sense of time and place to the player that lasts, Firewatch left an enduring impression of a dreamlike experience. Less positively, PC World's Hayden Dingman called it a game "full of excellent dialogue and breathtaking moments and stunning vistas that ultimately amounts to nothing much at all." Critics noted specific technical issues with the PlayStation 4 version of the game, which Campo Santo partially ameliorated with post-release patches.

Critics noted that, as with other walking simulators, Firewatch did not offer a great amount of gameplay; The Verge's Andrew Webster noted the main component of the game was the choices players made in conversation. Some reviews considered the relative ease of gameplay as helping to immerse players in the setting and focus on establishing a relationship with Delilah. Nathan Ditum, writing for The Guardian, wished that the hints of greater interactivity the game promised early on carried through to the end, and that there had been more puzzle solving as part of the gameplay.

Critics called the game's visuals "gorgeous", "stylized", and a "silkscreened poster art come to life". Iwaniuk called the exaggerated, "hyper-nature" look of the visuals the game's greatest strength, while IGN's Ryan McCaffrey noted that the Shoshone setting still felt like a real place despite the stylized look. Steven Hansen at Destructoid noted the small details of the world helped inform the setting and characters, from being able to see Henry's body to the labels on fireworks. The sound design was also praised, especially for building the sense of isolation or dread.

Firewatch's general story and storytelling were generally praised, with some reviews noting that the small team of Campo Santo had managed to make a game that felt much bigger. The game's opening sequence was complimented for its economy of storytelling, quickly establishing the character of Henry and making players care about him. Ditum and McCaffrey were among those who praised the writing for being believable, witty, and better than most games. Iwaniuk felt the abrupt jumps in time, especially towards the end of the game, led to an uneven pacing and detracted from the feeling of exploration and comfort of the woods. Towell wrote that the linear nature of the story and blocked paths sometimes made the game feel too much like a video game, and Time's Matt Peckham felt there was not enough time to connect with the characters before the mystery plot intruded. The characters and voice acting were lauded. Game Informer's Jeff Cork felt the radio conversations sounded natural and avoided feeling stilted like many other games. The characters of Henry and Delilah were called relatable, engaging, and enjoyable. Polygon's Colin Campbell wrote that Henry and Delilah were better-written than most game characters, and Butterworth described feeling like the characters were his friends he felt protective of and attached to. Towell wrote that the selection of responses allowed players to feel like they were affecting the game's characters and plot, but noted some occasions where repeated or mistimed dialogue shattered the illusion.

The game's ending divided critics. Hardcore Gamer and Game Developer's Emily Short wrote that the ending was a surprisingly mature and realistic way to finish the story. Similarly, The Washington Post's Christopher Byrd noted that careful attention to details in the setting would potentially clue in players that the mystery was something pedestrian, believing it was a strength in a medium "that's normally obsessed with feeding on the outlandish". In contrast, Shacknews's Josh Hawkins, among others, felt the ending was abrupt or less than satisfactory. PC World's Phil Savage liked the ending and felt that the reveal that Henry and Delilah were simply paranoid could have worked, citing Gone Home's anticlimactic ending, but he spent more time readjusting his expectations than appreciating the dramatic elements. Despite disliking the finale, McCaffrey and Campbell noted that the game's ending would spark debate and consideration long after playing; while Cork had a change of heart after replaying the game. "My initial feeling of 'That’s it?' gave way to a bittersweet feeling," he wrote, "that, just as in real life, 'That's it?' is sometimes all there is."

=== Accolades ===
Firewatch appeared on multiple publications' best-of lists for 2016, including Entertainment Weekly, New York, PC Gamer, PCGamesN, Wired, and Polygon, where it was the publication's Game of the Year. The game was nominated for a number of awards and won, among others, Best Indie Game at the Golden Joystick Awards, Best Debut and Best Narrative at the 17th Game Developers Choice Awards, and Best Debut at the British Academy Games Awards.

Year	Award	Category	Result	Ref.
2016	Unity Awards 2016	Best Desktop/Console Game	Nominated	
2016	Unity Awards 2016	Best 3D Visual Experience	Won	
2016	Golden Joystick Awards 2016	Best Original Game	Nominated	
2016	Golden Joystick Awards 2016	Best Storytelling	Nominated	
2016	Golden Joystick Awards 2016	Best Visual Design	Nominated	
2016	Golden Joystick Awards 2016	Best Indie Game	Won	
2016	Golden Joystick Awards 2016	PlayStation Game of the Year	Nominated	
2016	The Game Awards 2016	Best Narrative	Nominated	
2016	The Game Awards 2016	Best Art Direction	Nominated	
2016	The Game Awards 2016	Best Performance (Cissy Jones as Delilah)	Nominated	
2016	The Game Awards 2016	Best Performance (Rich Sommer as Henry)	Nominated	
2016	The Game Awards 2016	Best Independent Game	Nominated	
2016	Giant Bomb's 2016 Game of the Year Awards	Best Music	Nominated	
2016	Giant Bomb's 2016 Game of the Year Awards	Best Story	Nominated	
2017	20th Annual D.I.C.E. Awards	Adventure Game of the Year	Nominated	
2017	20th Annual D.I.C.E. Awards	D.I.C.E. Sprite Award	Nominated	
2017	20th Annual D.I.C.E. Awards	Outstanding Achievement in Art Direction	Nominated	
2017	20th Annual D.I.C.E. Awards	Outstanding Achievement in Character (Delilah)	Nominated	
2017	20th Annual D.I.C.E. Awards	Outstanding Achievement in Character (Henry)	Nominated	
2017	20th Annual D.I.C.E. Awards	Outstanding Achievement in Story	Nominated	
2017	17th Game Developers Choice Awards	Innovation Award	Nominated	
2017	17th Game Developers Choice Awards	Best Debut	Won	
2017	17th Game Developers Choice Awards	Best Narrative	Won	
2017	17th Game Developers Choice Awards	Best Visual Art	Nominated	
2017	17th Game Developers Choice Awards	Game of the Year	Nominated	
2017	National Academy of Video Game Trade Reviewers	Performance in a Drama Lead (Cissy Jones as Delilah)	Nominated	
2017	National Academy of Video Game Trade Reviewers	Performance in a Drama Lead (Rich Sommer as Henry)	Won	
2017	National Academy of Video Game Trade Reviewers	Writing in a Drama	Won	
2017	National Academy of Video Game Trade Reviewers	Game, Original Adventure	Won	
2017	British Academy Games Awards	Best Game	Nominated	
2017	British Academy Games Awards	Debut Game	Won	
2017	British Academy Games Awards	Game Innovation	Nominated	
2017	British Academy Games Awards	Narrative	Nominated	
2017	British Academy Games Awards	Original Property	Nominated	
2017	British Academy Games Awards	Performer (Cissy Jones as Delilah)	Won	
2017	The Edge Awards 2016	Best Storytelling	Won	
