= The Cave (video game) =

2013 video game

- Developer: Double Fine Productions
- Publisher: Sega (Note: Xbox Game Studios (from 2023))
- Director: Ron Gilbert
- Producer: Matt Hansen
- Designer: JP LeBreton
- Programmer: Chad Dawson
- Artist: Andy Wood
- Writers: Ron Gilbert; Chris Remo
- Composer: Brian Min
- Engine: Buddha
- Platforms: PlayStation 3, Wii U, Xbox 360, Windows, OS X, Linux, iOS, Android
- Release: January 22, 2013: PlayStation 3, Wii U; NA: January 22, 2013; PAL: January 23, 2013 Xbox 360; WW: January 23, 2013 Windows, OS X; WW: January 24, 2013 Linux; WW: February 19, 2013 iOS; WW: October 3, 2013 Android; WW: December 2, 2013
- Genres: Puzzle-platform, adventure
- Modes: Single-player, multiplayer

The Cave is a puzzle-platform adventure game developed by Double Fine Productions and published by Sega in January 2013 on the PlayStation Network, Nintendo eShop and Xbox Live Arcade storefronts via the PlayStation 3, Wii U and Xbox 360 consoles and on Steam for Microsoft Windows, OS X and Linux. It was later released on October 3, 2013 on iOS devices and Android. On December 2, 2013 it was also released on the Ouya. The game has been delisted from console storefronts as of April 2, 2018, making it a Steam exclusive until 2023.

The game was created by Ron Gilbert, building on an idea he had had for nearly twenty years about a cave that lures people into it to explore their darker personality traits. The game is rated "teen" for blood and violence. The game borrows concepts from his earlier 1987 game, Maniac Mansion, such as the player initially selecting three different characters from a cast of seven to explore the Cave. Many of the game's puzzles require the three characters to work in coordination to complete, while some puzzles are specific to the unique abilities of a character; in this manner the Cave can only be fully explored through multiple play-throughs.

== Gameplay ==
The Cave's story is based on a magical talking cave (voiced by Stephen Stanton) with a labyrinthine set of tunnels within it. Seven characters, drawn from across time and space and harboring dark secrets, have come to the Cave, believing they can "learn something about themselves and who they might become", as stated by Gilbert. In one example, a knight character goes to a princess for her amulet, which is the key to unlocking the pulling of the sword, who tells him to bring the treasure the dragon is guarding. The knight then succeeds, but forgets to close the gate to the dragon's den, in turn causing the dragon to eat the princess and cough up the amulet. The knight then goes to the king with the amulet and is allowed to pull the sword, which was impossible at first due to the many rocks beneath it - however, our characters overcome it by blowing it with dynamite. He then pulls out the sword, and the king "ran off to congratulate his favorite daughter", but then gets eaten by the dragon as well. At the start of the game, the player selects three of the seven characters, which they are then locked to for the remainder of the game; players can restart a new game to select a different trio of characters. The characters are based on stereotypical figures, such as a hillbilly, a pair of twins (acting as one character), and a scientist.

The knight character in The Cave, at the controls of the giant claw machine. Players are shown what objects they can interact with through the on-screen text, such as the "Levers and Such" caption here.

As the player controls the trio to explore the Cave, they collect objects and interact with the environment in a manner similar to an adventure game. The exploration of the game is based on 2D platformer elements, though the game is presented with 3D graphics. Exploration is described as being "Metroidvania"-like, where more of the Cave's tunnels and chambers become accessible as players collect objects in a manner similar to Metroid or Castlevania. The player will need to work with all three characters, switching between them typically to activate multiple parts of a puzzle; one example shown in early press demonstrations was to use one character to ring a bell to distract a monster, a second character to repair a hot dog vending machine so to provide bait, and a third to operate a giant claw machine to pick up the monster to clear their path. Each character has a unique ability to aid in maneuvering the cave tunnels, leaving some areas inaccessible if the appropriate characters aren't chosen at the start; for example, the adventurer is able to swing herself across gaps with a rope, while the time traveler can phase shift a short distance, passing through closed gates. In addition, some areas of the Cave are accessible only to one of the specific characters; such as the knight finding a castle or the scientist discovering a laboratory; these areas represent the deep desires and dark aspects of a character that lured him or her to the Cave in the first place. While there are hazards that can kill a character, the character respawns shortly afterwards nearby, allowing the player to reattempt the move. Throughout the game will be iconographs for each of the three characters, which the player will need to get near to activate; these provide one of several still art images that reveal the character's back-story.

The game is primarily a single-player game, but up to three players can participate cooperatively on the same computer or console, each controlling one of the three selected characters.

== Development ==
Ron Gilbert has been working with adventure games since his days at LucasArts, including several collaborations with Tim Schafer and Dave Grossman; together, they developed games like Maniac Mansion, its sequel Day of the Tentacle, and the first games in the Monkey Island series. Gilbert left LucasArts in 1992, initially creating his own development studio Humongous Entertainment, but then moving on to other games, including contributing to Telltale Games' episodic series, Tales of Monkey Island based on the LucasArts series. Meanwhile, Schafer would stay with LucasArts until the adventure game market fell in the late 1990s, and created his own studio, Double Fine Productions, with several of the former LucasArts developers. Though Double Fine struggled with well-received but financially unsuccessful titles Psychonauts and Brütal Legend, it became successful in marketing four smaller games developed during an "Amnesia Fortnight" period in Brütal Legend's development between 2010 and 2011.

Gilbert has stated that the idea of The Cave has been one he has had for a long time; he said, of his idea, "People have really dark secrets, and going into a cave which is really dark and deep… that metaphor really resonated with me". While still at LucasArts, Gilbert had drawn out parts of a labyrinthine cave complex on paper, but the idea never expanded beyond that at that point. Prior to Gilbert's employment at Double Fine, he and Schafer continued to discuss game development and ideas; Gilbert had mentioned this cave idea, prompting Schafer to suggest him coming to work at his company to develop the idea. By September 2010, Gilbert was officially part of Double Fine to work on The Cave; at the time, Gilbert had stated that the title was "an entirely new concept" and that "fans of those old adventure games will like it". The timing of larger development of The Cave coincided with the resurgence in adventure games such as those produced by Telltale Games, and the success of the Double Fine Adventure Kickstarter. Gilbert also considered that with casual games becoming more mainstream and acceptable, the market can handle niche games such as adventure games which do not require fast reflexes. Despite the market potential, Gilbert found that pitching the game to publishers was still a challenge, as they did not perceive that a market would exist for such games. Through the act of pitching the game to publishers for the first time in his career, Gilbert had to move away from the free-form design he had used on previous titles and set out plans for the game as a whole, which he found as a benefit; the need to present information to potential publishers required him to think about the game as a whole while still allowing smaller elements to be added in at a later date as they saw fit.

The Cave's gameplay development was based on three defining factors in Gilbert's mind: having the player select three of a number of characters to explore the cave, to offer a "light" platforming element to offer other challenges outside of puzzles, and to avoid the use of an inventory system. Gilbert's earlier Maniac Mansion influenced him to revisit the concept of having several playable characters that the player can switch between. Gilbert noted that within Maniac Mansion, several of the characters have minimal use within the game, and sought to correct that within The Cave by giving equal weight to each of the seven playable characters. Gilbert recognized that with seven characters the player would need to play the game three times to see all the character-specific content in the game, but felt this was still a good number to use. He recognized that from Maniac Mansion, players would tend to gravitate towards or away from certain characters, and may always want to play with one specific character in the game. Gilbert maintained the same count in The Cave for this reason. While other aspects of Maniac Mansion may have influenced other design decisions within The Cave, Gilbert considered these less likely to have been conscious decisions on his part. The structure of the Cave within the game was designed to give each character a large unique area to explore, as to avoid the scenario where "you play it again and 95 percent is the same".

While the game is part platformer, Gilbert's intent was not to make it a challenge to traverse the Cave, noting that it is nearly impossible to die by missing a jump. Instead, the platforming elements were added as to add variety to moving about the Cave, recalling that in the development of the Monkey Island games, players would become bored walking the same area over and over again. Gilbert's aim for the game's puzzles was to keep them less demanding to allow the game's story and visuals to be the main focus of the player's attention, comparing this to similar methods used in the game Limbo. Gilbert did not want to penalize players for cheap or permanent character deaths, feeling that the death-and-respawn approach would be taken as "a minor set-back".

Similarly to reduce the game's complexity, he did not include a typical inventory system as with most adventure games; each character can carry a single object, which is shown being carried on screen, aiding as visual aids for puzzle solving instead of having to sort through multiple inventory screens. Gilbert wanted the game to be playable by several people, recounting his youth experience of playing the text-based Colossal Cave Adventure with several of his friends, working together to solve puzzles. Similarly, Gilbert took into account that his older games were designed for a different audience, where developers "needed to provide 40 hours of gameplay, because that was the standard" while players "wanted to be bashing their heads against the screen for days on end" to solve comparatively hard puzzles; instead, The Cave was designed to be "more forgiving" and "more accommodating" to the modern audiences.

Gilbert compared the development of the world, characters, and puzzles similar to his past LucasArts adventure games. For example, Gilbert identified the mansion as the "genesis" for the rest of Maniac Mansion; in a similar manner, the team for The Cave first created the environs of the Cave, leading to the development of characters that would likely inhabit or visit the Cave, fleshing their individual roles out into a larger story and eventually into designing key puzzle elements for the game. Gilbert had started with more ideas for playable characters, up to 20 or 30 based on common stereotypes including an opera singer and a CIA agent, but discarded these when he could not flesh out their reasons for wanting to go to the Cave, and keeping others that he considered his favorites. Gilbert also sought to provide an equal number of characters of each gender, using the twins – a boy and girl – to satisfy this requirement.

The Cave is a sentient character in the game, following on Gilbert's idea that the Cave has witnessed all of human evolution over time and mankind's fascination with caves, and thus would be an interesting character within the story. This made it a challenge in writing the story, as the Cave acts as a narrator alongside other voiced non-player characters, but the main playable ones will remain silent. This also allowed Gilbert to keep a sense of mystery about the playable characters; if they were voiced, the dialog would have likely explicitly spelled out their reasons for being in the Cave, while their ultimate goals remain shrouded if they were silent. A cartoon-ish art style, with the characters having larger-than-normal heads and more exaggerated movements, was chosen to allow the characters to still express themselves in a manner that can easily be seen by the player.

Two months after the release of The Cave, Gilbert announced he was leaving Double Fine after setting out to complete the game he wanted, and was time to "move on" and "plot my next move". The departure was on completely amiable terms with the company, according to Gilbert. Gilbert further clarified that his employment at Double Fine had always been specifically to develop The Cave with no firm plans beyond that; further collaborative efforts with Double Fine remain a possibility in the future. He stated that he considers himself a "nomad" in game development, preferring smaller teams, and was already working with a former collaborator from DeathSpank towards a new mobile game.

=== Release ===
Work on the game had been progressing for about a year at Double Fine prior to the game's announcement; Gilbert stated that the six months prior to that period from when he was hired into the apartament (not studioe) was used to start developing the ideas for them, with more earnest work by a larger team starting when they identified Sega as their publisher.

As the game's full announcement neared, Gilbert used his blog to tease parts of the game's artwork done in collaboration with Double Fine's art team. Double Fine would later trademark the name "The Cave", affirming this was unrelated to the Double Fine Adventure game that was funded through Kickstarter. Just prior to its announcement, Gilbert provided more artwork which some noted fit perfect within an image published by Sega on their blog, suggesting that the project would be published by the latter. The game was formally announced as The Cave on May 24, 2012, with Sega as Double Fine's publisher for the downloadable title. Schafer participated as creative director for the title. Sega opted to publish the title as part of its growth into downloadable titles; Hakuri Satomi, Sega's Vice President for digital business, called out to the game's originality and valued the experienced and creativity of Gilbert and the Double Fine team. The game was initially set for release on Microsoft Windows, PlayStation 3, Wii U, and Xbox 360 consoles, but Gilbert has stated they are looking into an iOS version and other touch-based platforms, though have not committed yet; specifically they have encountered a technical limitation in iOS that may prevent them from bringing the game there. Double Fine has announced that they will also develop a version for the Android-based Ouya console.

Technically, the game is being developed with the Microsoft Windows platform as the core, as Gilbert did not want this version to feel like a console port; Gilbert also attests that he is "primarily a [personal computer] gamer" and wanted to stay true to the platform. Windows users pre-ordering the title on Steam also obtained themed items for Team Fortress 2 based on the Hillbilly character's outfit. The Mac OS X version was announced alongside the release date, with Windows and Mac OS X users able to take advantage of Steam Play to use the title within either operating system. The versions for other platforms will be virtually identical to each other, with Gilbert stating that they "did work really hard to ensure that visually everything you're seeing is identical" between the console versions. The Wii U version will use the Wii U GamePad as a character selection device as well as to shift focus to the character on the screen, but otherwise will add no new features.

From IOS 11 The Cave will no longer be supported and will not be available to buy from the app store.

In 2023, the rights of the game reverted back to Double Fine Productions and Xbox Game Studios and the game was released to Xbox Game Pass and GOG.com on July 18, 2023.

== Reception ==
Reception

Aggregate score
Aggregator	Score
Metacritic	PS3: 72/100; WIIU: 72/100; X360: 70/100; PC: 68/100 iOS: 65/100

Review scores
Publication	Score
Edge	6/10
Electronic Gaming Monthly	9/10
Eurogamer	7/10
Game Informer	7.75/10
GameSpot	7/10
Giant Bomb	3/5
IGN	7.9/10
TouchArcade	4/5

The Cave was met with mixed reviews. Aggregating review website Metacritic gave the Xbox 360 version 70/100, the PlayStation 3 version 72/100, the PC version 68/100, and the Wii U version 72/100. Several journalists acknowledged the wit and humor of Gilbert and Double Fine, but found puzzles to be too simple and require too much tedious traversing of non-dangerous areas of the cave.
