= Campo Santo (company) =

American video game developer

Campo Santo Productions LLC
- Type: Subsidiary
- Industry: Video games
- Founded: September 18, 2013; 13 years ago in San Francisco, US
- Founders: Sean Vanaman; Jake Rodkin; Nels Anderson; Olly Moss
- Headquarters: Bellevue, Washington, US
- Key people: Sean Vanaman; Jake Rodkin
- Products: Firewatch
- Number of employees: 12 (2018)
- Parent: Valve (2018–present)
- Website: camposanto.com

Campo Santo Productions LLC is an American video game developer based in Bellevue, Washington. Founded in September 2013 by Sean Vanaman, Jake Rodkin, Nels Anderson, and Olly Moss, the studio is best known for its debut game released in 2016, Firewatch. The company was acquired by Valve in April 2018.

== History ==
Sean Vanaman and Jake Rodkin were both at Telltale Games as co-writers on the 2012 game The Walking Dead, which was considered Telltale's first turn into a more narrative type of episodic adventure game. The game was a critical success, and while other projects came along, Vanaman started to become too comfortable with his role at Telltale, and felt that he would be more motivated if there was more discomfort or risk in his duties. After talking about the idea with Rodkin, the two left the company and co-founded Campo Santo on September 18, 2013, joined by Mark of the Ninja designer Nels Anderson and graphic artist Olly Moss. Environment artist Jane Ng and designer and composer Chris Remo, who had also worked with Vanaman and Rodkin on the Idle Thumbs podcast, soon joined the team as well.

Soon after, they announced Panic would back their debut project. After a painting by Moss, Ng adapted the painting's aesthetic style into a 3D environment with the color and inspiration drawn from both New Deal advertisements and icons from the National Park Service as well as a camping trip in Yellowstone National Park in which the team visited a preserved fire lookout tower two miles (3.2 km) from the campsite. Development eventually led to the announcement of Firewatch in March 2014, with release originally slated for 2015.

In August 2014, a game demo of Firewatch was released at PAX West, revealing the overall plotline and story of a fire lookout named Henry in the Shoshone National Forest in 1989. The game was released for Windows, PlayStation 4, macOS, Linux, and Xbox One in late 2016. The game received positive reviews from critics, and has been nominatively known alongside other "walking simulators". The original score to Firewatch by Chris Remo was released digitally alongside the game, and received a vinyl release later in 2016. A rerelease of the vinyl was crowdfunded independently by Remo in late 2020, and concluded in early 2021. A further, smaller release was held by Remo again on 1st April 2022.

In February 2016, Vanaman stated that Campo Santo's next game would not be a sequel to Firewatch. In September 2016, both Campo Santo and Good Universe issued a partnership to produce a feature film adaptation of Firewatch and other content. In November 2016, the company stated that the game would begin a limited-run physical release towards the end of the year. At the same time, it was announced that Firewatch had sold over a million copies.

In June 2016, Ford Motor Company used an image that closely resembled promotional art from Firewatch, which caused controversy from both Panic, Vanaman and others. Shortly thereafter, Quirk Auto Dealers issued an apology, stating that Ford was not involved within the advertisement planning.

In September 2017, Sean Vanaman tweeted that he would be issuing a Digital Millennium Copyright Act (DMCA) takedown against the streamer PewDiePie's playthrough of Firewatch in response to him using a racial slur while streaming PlayerUnknown's Battlegrounds. The move resulted in a backlash from the gaming community, and Firewatch was "review-bombed" on Steam. Ars Technica noted that the company previously stated on their website that they gave open permission to stream and monetize videos made while playing the game.

On April 21, 2018, Campo Santo announced that they had been acquired by Valve and would subsequently move to Valve's Bellevue, Washington headquarters and continuing In the Valley of Gods as a Valve game. According to Vanaman and Rodkin, after the success of Firewatch, they started internal discussions of where they wanted to take their company. These discussions continued informally with third parties, including Valve's Robin Walker, Erik Johnson and Scott Lynch. These Valve employees suggested that Campo Santo could retain its own direction while being wholly within Valve, yet still draw from Valve's knowledge and expertise. Vanaman and Rodkin discussed this more formally with Valve, ultimately leading to the acquisition.

Development on In The Valley of Gods was put on hold in July 2019, partially due to head writer Sean Vanaman moving to the writing team for Half-Life: Alyx, which had not been announced to the public at the time. In November 2019, it was noted by journalists that Claire Hummel, Jane Ng, and Rodkin had removed In the Valley of Gods from their Twitter profile descriptions. The game also disappeared from Campo Santo's website and the original announcement trailer was made private on YouTube, though the website and its Steam profile page were still available. It was later revealed by Rodkin that the game was put on hold as he and the other designers of the game had been busy working on other projects at Valve, such as Half-Life: Alyx, Dota Underlords, and Steam.

== Games ==
Year	Title	Publisher(s)	Platform(s)	Notes
2016	Firewatch	Panic Inc., Campo Santo	Windows, macOS, Linux, PlayStation 4, Xbox One, Nintendo Switch	
TBA	In the Valley of Gods	Campo Santo	Windows, macOS, Linux	Development on hold since 2019.
