= Puzzle Agent 2 =

2011 video game

- Developer: Telltale Games
- Publisher: Telltale Games
- Director: Jonathan Sgro
- Designer: Graham Annable
- Programmer: Tulley Rafferty
- Writers: Graham Annable; Chuck Jordan; Sean Vanaman
- Composers: Jared Emerson-Johnson; Rich Vreeland; Nick Mastroianni
- Engine: Telltale Tool
- Platforms: Windows, Mac OS X, iOS
- Release: June 30, 2011
- Genre: Adventure/Puzzle
- Mode: Single-player

Puzzle Agent 2 is an adventure/puzzle game by Telltale Games, in collaboration with Graham Annable. It is the sequel to Nelson Tethers: Puzzle Agent (2010). It was released on June 30, 2011.

== Gameplay ==
Similar to the first installment, the gameplay structure of the game resembles that of a linear adventure game. Players do not have an inventory, but they can engage in dialogues with other characters. Certain items or dialogue choices may lead to puzzles that need to be solved, although some puzzles may not have any consequence on the game's progress. The puzzles encompass various types, including jigsaw, math, and logic puzzles. Each puzzle is accompanied by a brief description of the objective, while some also include a set of rules and conditions to assist players in deducing the solution.

For each puzzle, players can request up to three hints, with each hint costing them a piece of chewing gum. Chewing gum is scarce in the town, as explained by the hotel clerk, but the protagonist, Nelson, can collect discarded pieces of gum found at each location. The puzzles do not automatically validate the player's solution, even if it is correct. Nelson must transmit the answer back to headquarters, where it will be either approved or rejected. If the solution is approved, the player is awarded a score based on the number of hints used and the number of failed attempts (the latter represented in taxpayer dollars). Additionally, an optional further explanation is provided to guide players on how to solve the puzzle.

== Plot ==
In the game sequel, Tethers, a FBI agent, cannot let go of the unsolved Scoggins case and suspects a cover-up by the FBI. He decides to conduct an unofficial investigation and returns to Scoggins, leaving his colleague Jim Ingraham in charge of his files. Tethers stays at Valda's Inn and has a dream in which an astronaut visits him, leaving a note on the floor. When he wakes up, he finds the note, stating that "Isaac Davner does not exist" on one side and a list of names on the other side. Tethers discovers that the names belong to people who have mysteriously disappeared in Sasimy Woods over the years.

Tethers meets a local resident named Darryl Boutin, who reveals that his brother is one of the missing people. Tethers learns about Scoggins' folklore, particularly the Hidden People, from anthropologist Alfred Versteckt and his student Will Medlock. Tethers seeks access to the missing persons files from Sheriff Bahg but is denied. However, Glori Davner, who previously tried to kill Tethers, offers to distract Bahg in exchange for Tethers finding her husband, Isaac. Glori believes the Brotherhood of Scoggins is responsible for the disappearances and reveals that they had Isaac locked away in the eraser factory, believing he was "chosen."

Tethers successfully retrieves the missing persons files and meets puzzle enthusiast Melkorka Teterdottir, who posted the note under his door. She believes that Isaac's true identity is Ed Davis, a test pilot declared dead after his crash in Sasimy Woods. Korka believes Ed Davis is living in the woods as a serial killer responsible for the disappearances. She enlists Tethers' help in hunting him down and sends him to search the woods. Tethers encounters a member of the Brotherhood named Edvard but loses him and discovers the body of an astronaut before being spooked by the Hidden People.

Returning to Korka's house, Tethers finds her dismissing the Hidden People as an urban myth. He then interrogates Bjorn, the leader of the Brotherhood, who reveals that the Brotherhood members have also disappeared in the woods. Bjorn believes the Hidden People are angry about something nearby, possibly related to their "choosing" of Isaac. Bjorn directs Tethers to the cabin of Olav Welhaven, where Tethers discovers research connecting lunar eclipses to lunacy.

Returning to Korka with his findings, Tethers realizes she is obsessed with the "Kitimat Incident" involving a rumored Sasquatch discovery. Tethers seeks Alfred's help and shows him the research. Alfred suggests combining their findings to locate the Hidden People's home. Together, they venture into the woods, but Alfred disappears, and Tethers finds a campsite centered around a crashed lunar lander occupied by astronauts. Tethers spots the remains of a skier but is captured and sedated by the astronauts.

Tethers wakes up at Valda's Inn and learns that the FBI has discovered his findings. He confronts FBI Director Jennings, who warns him to back away from the case. Tethers refuses and discovers that the astronaut's body was an empty suit. Isaac reveals himself as Ed Davis, explaining his involvement in a secret mission to the Moon. The crashed lander disrupted the Hidden People's habitat, and they chose Isaac to destroy the Lunar Ray, a device that repelled them.

Tethers agrees to help Isaac and together they head to the lander. However, they are intercepted by the Men in Black. Tethers receives a call from Ingraham, who points out a melody in Olav's recording. Tethers realizes it was used to summon the Hidden People and returns to the cabin. The Hidden People enter, whispering to Tethers. He experiences an illusion where he agrees to help them destroy the Ray. When he snaps back, he finds himself at the lander in his underwear surrounded by agents.

Tethers sabotages the Ray, but it malfunctions, causing insanity. He escapes with the Ray and is unable to throw it into the lake due to the thick ice. The Sasquatch appears and breaks the ice, allowing the Ray to sink, ending its influence. Despite going against orders, Tethers is allowed to return to the FBI, while Ingraham is relocated for assisting him. Tethers receives a postcard from Isaac and Glori, who have reunited and are on vacation.

== Reception ==
Reception

Aggregate score
Aggregator	Score
Metacritic	(PC) 63/100 (iOS) 71/100

Puzzle Agent 2 was the first runner up for "Best Mobile Game" in the 1UP.com Best of E3 awards. It was also the first runner up for "Best iPhone/iPad Game" and the second runner up for "Best Puzzle Game" in the IGN Best of E3 awards.
