= Environment artist =

Type of artist employed in the video game and film industries

An environment artist is an artist who typically works in the video game industry or film industry as a 3D modeler, specializing in outdoor and indoor locations for a game or film setting. They are responsible for set dressing, creating and modeling the majority of the overall assets and visuals a player encounters, and for bringing life to that setting. They texture and place assets, such as buildings, streets, foliage, and furniture into a scene. In a game environment, the artist also defines collisions so that the player doesn't run through walls or other objects that block movement, and optimizes mesh geometry so that the level runs at a manageable framerate.

== History ==
The history of environment art is characterized by a gradual progression of technical advancements that enabled such projects. Although it is difficult to pinpoint its origins, various individuals and their contributions have significantly upgraded backgrounds and environments work.

=== Film ===
The Walt Disney Company created cinematography in the animation realm. Many individuals contributed to the Disney style. Eyvind Earle and Claude Coats were award-winning artists who worked on films such as Snow White and the Seven Dwarfs, Fantasia, Cinderella, Peter Pan, and Sleeping Beauty. Earle and Coats produced many effects via styling and colors. For example, Earle produced the "magical, medieval look" that is in Sleeping Beauty and Claude produced "stunning watercolor background paintings" in Pinocchio.

Later techniques such as matte painting, miniatures, rear projection, and forced perspective were used to simulate large-scale settings, oftentimes when "backgrounds and environments [were] too expensive, impractical, or impossible to recreate or achieve through traditional on-location or practical set design". Popular films such as Star Wars: Empire Strikes Back used matte painting to achieve realism in the background.

=== Gaming ===
Early games such as Pong used simple backgrounds, often with solid colors. This was followed by pixel art in games such as Donkey Kong, Legend of Zelda, and Super Mario Bros. GPUs allowed realism in game art, including 3D graphics in Doom to simulate a 3D environment. Later games had access to both 2D and 3D imagery via software such as Maya, Blender, Nuke, Unreal Engine, and Adobe Creative Suite. For example, VALORANT's maps are 3D.

== Impacts and challenges ==
As it became possible to render almost anything in an artist's imagination, matters such as historical and physical accuracy increased in importance. An example is Assassin's Creed's depiction of Notre Dame. Misrepresentation in games can be accepted as fact among those without other sources of information.
