= Spacebase DF-9 =

2014 video game

- Spacebase DF-9 logo
- Developer: Double Fine Productions
- Publisher: Double Fine Productions
- Director: JP Lebreton
- Platforms: Microsoft Windows, OS X, Linux
- Release: WW: October 27, 2014
- Genre: Space simulator
- Mode: Single-player

Spacebase DF-9 is a space simulator video game developed by Double Fine Productions. It was prototyped during Double Fine's open Amnesia Fortnight 2012, directed by JP Lebreton. After being released as an open beta on October 15, 2013, it was officially released on October 27, 2014, for Microsoft Windows, OS X, and Linux. After the official end-of-life of the game in May 2015, the community took over the development based on an open-source code fork. The community fork of this game has also since been abandoned, the last update Patch v1.09 Unofficial - Jan 16, 2023 marking the end of community-accepted contributions.

== Gameplay ==
The player designs, builds and maintains a space station, and must keep its inhabitants happy while fending off alien threats.

== Development ==
Spacebase DF-9 was one of several ideas presented for voting for Double Fine's Amnesia Fortnight 2012 project, where users would be able to vote for the game concepts they felt they would want to play the most. Spacebase DF-9 was an idea presented by designer-programmer JP LeBreton. The title received the second most votes and was one of five other titles that Double Fine stated they would develop into full games. A full commercial version of the game was announced on October 15, 2013, with an alpha version being available to purchase through Steam Early Access. Double Fine announced on September 17, 2014 that the full game would be released in October 2014. In addition, they promised to release the game's Lua source code to allow the community to develop new content and features independently.

== Release ==
In September 2014, Double Fine announced that they were going to bring Spacebase DF-9 out of early access status, and add features to make the game a full commercial release, due to a lack of sales for the game during the early access period. After the commercial release, Double Fine will release part of the source code and no new features will be added, but Double Fine will still be offering support of the game and making bug fix releases. The news was met with controversy, with some fans expressing anger over the fact that the game would not continue development, and some developers questioning whether a failure by a well known developer to successfully use the early access model would tarnish that model for other developers.

The release of v1.0 commenced on October 27, 2014, simultaneously with release of Lua source code. The retail version included a tutorial mode, goals screen and bugfixes.

After the release of v1.0 on November 21, 2014, twelve employees were laid off including the programmer and project lead JP LeBreton. On December 16, 2014 Greg Rice posted on the official technical support forums stating that there were no further plans for patches and there was no team assigned to the project.

Double Fine officially ended support for Spacebase and ceased development of the game in May 2015. Part of the game's source code was released to the public under the CPAL open-source license, and since then, fans have worked to continue the game's development and support. The game's community has provided bug fixes and extensions to the game based on Double Fine's documented plans, and the first community patch was released in October 2015. The second unofficial patch was released in February 2016.

== Reception ==
Reception

Aggregate score
Aggregator	Score
Metacritic	49/100

Review score
Publication	Score
IGN	6.8/10

Spacebase DF-9 has a 46/100 Metacritic score. IGN gave the game a 6.8/10 score and commented: "Spacebase DF-9 is charming, and its random events give you more to do and worry about than something like Banished. However, it lacks the depth and polish needed to make the tasks of expansion and crisis management go smoothly."
