= Sean Vanaman =

American video game designer (born 1984)

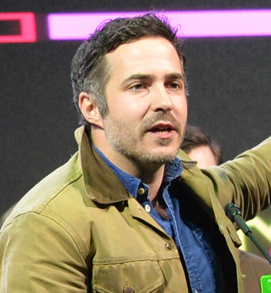
- Vanaman at Game Developers Choice Awards
- Born: June 16, 1984 (age 42); Cork, Ireland
- Occupations: Video game designer; writer; podcaster
- Years active: 2009–present
- Employers: Telltale Games (2009–2013); Valve (2018–present)
- Known for: Campo Santo
- Notable work: Wallace & Gromit's Grand Adventures; Puzzle Agent 2; Tales of Monkey Island; The Walking Dead; Firewatch; Half-Life: Alyx
- Website: camposanto.com

Sean Vanaman (born June 16, 1984) is an American video game designer, writer, and podcaster. He was the co-project leader and lead writer of The Walking Dead, and Puzzle Agent 2. He also wrote the third episode of Tales of Monkey Island, and was the designer of Wallace & Gromit's Grand Adventures, and the writer of the third episode, Muzzled. He was one of the regular hosts of the Idle Thumbs podcast and is one of the co-founders of Campo Santo, the company that produced Firewatch.

== Early life ==
Vanaman was born and raised in Cork, Ireland. He and his family moved from Ireland to the United States.

== Career ==
While studying at University of Southern California, Vanaman interned at Buena Vista Games (later renamed Disney Interactive Studios) in their creative development group. This group put together the initial concept and pitch for Epic Mickey in 2003. After graduation, he worked as an associate creative development producer at Disney Interactive. In 2008, Vanaman took a position at Telltale Games as a writer and game designer. He worked on Wallace & Gromit's Grand Adventures, Tales of Monkey Island, and Nelson Tethers: Puzzle Agent before becoming project lead on Poker Night at the Inventory and The Walking Dead.

On September 18, 2013, he and Jake Rodkin left Telltale and joined with Olly Moss and Mark of the Ninja lead designer Nels Anderson to found Campo Santo.

== Recognition ==
Tales of Monkey Island, for which Vanaman co-wrote, was nominated for "Best Artistic Design" and won for the award for "Biggest Surprise" at IGN's Best of PC E3 2009 Awards. After release, it won the PC Gamer 2009 "Adventure Game of the Year", was nominated for the IGN "Best Adventure Game of the Year" for PC and Wii, won the Adventure Gamers "Best Adventure of 2009", and was named the "Best Series Revival" by OC Weekly.

Puzzle Agent 2 was nominated at IGN's Best of E3 2011 Awards for "Best iPhone/iPad Game". The Walking Dead also won over 90 "Game of the Year" awards since release.

Vanaman won Game (Original Adventure) and Writing in a Drama at the 2017 National Academy of Video Game Trade Reviewers Awards for his work on Firewatch.

== Works ==
Year	Title	Role	Genre	Company
2009	Wallace & Gromit's Grand Adventures	Writer/designer	Graphic adventure	Telltale Games
2009	Tales of Monkey Island	Writer/designer	Graphic adventure	Telltale Games
2010	Sam & Max: The Devil's Playhouse	Episode design – The City that Dares Not Sleep	Point-and-click game	Telltale Games
2010	Puzzle Agent	Writer Puzzle design	Puzzle	Telltale Games
2010	CSI: Fatal Conspiracy	Designer	Puzzle	Ubisoft
2010	Poker Night at the Inventory	Project leader	Poker	Telltale Games
2011	Puzzle Agent 2	Lead writer	Puzzle	Telltale Games
2012	The Walking Dead	Director (Episodes 1, 3 and 5), Project leader, Lead Writer	Graphic adventure	Telltale Games
2016	Firewatch	Writer	Adventure game	Panic
2020	Half-Life: Alyx	Writer	First-person shooter	Valve
2020	Dota 2	Writer (Aghanim's Labyrinth)	MOBA	Valve

== Controversies ==
In November 2020, a Reddit post accused Vanaman of abusing his administrative privileges as a Valve employee, by manually penalizing a fellow Dota 2 player for not following his recommended playstyle. Vanaman responded by apologizing on behalf of Valve and stating that employees from thereon out would be stripped of their in-game administrative tools – leaving actions explicitly to respondents of formal player reports.
