= Puzzle Agent =

2010 video game

- Steam header
- Developer: Telltale Games
- Publisher: Telltale Games
- Producer: Matt Hansen
- Designers: Graham Annable; Mark Darin
- Programmer: Robert Oates
- Artist: Jonathan Sgro
- Writers: Graham Annable; Mark Darin
- Composers: Jared Emerson-Johnson; Rich Vreeland; Nick Mastroianni
- Engine: Telltale Tool
- Platforms: Windows, Mac OS X, iOS, PlayStation 3 (PSN)
- Release: June 30, 2010: Windows, Mac OS X; WW: June 30, 2010; iOS; AU: September 1, 2010; NA/EU: September 2, 2010 PlayStation 3; NA: April 19, 2011; PAL: June 1, 2011
- Genres: Adventure, puzzle
- Mode: Single-player

Puzzle Agent (formerly Nelson Tethers: Puzzle Agent) is an adventure/puzzle game by Telltale Games, in collaboration with Graham Annable. It is the first game to come out of Telltale's pilot project. The game was influenced by the works of David Lynch, Stanley Kubrick and the Coen brothers (most notably Twin Peaks and Fargo). This is one of two Telltale Games titles that have an original character, the other being Telltale Texas Hold'em.

Puzzle Agent was released on June 30, 2010. A WiiWare release of the game for the Wii was planned but eventually cancelled. A sequel, Puzzle Agent 2, was released the following year.

== Gameplay ==
The game structure resembles a linear adventure game – the player doesn't have an inventory, but can traverse into dialog trees with other characters. Some items or choices of dialog result in puzzles to be solved, although in some cases the puzzle has no consequence in the game's progress. The types of puzzles vary from jigsaw through mathematics to logic puzzles. Each of them has a basic short description about the objective of the puzzle, while some have a basic set of rules and conditions that help the player deduce the solution. The player can request three hints for each puzzle, and each hint costs the player a piece of chewing gum – gum is on shortage in the town, as the hotel clerk explains, but Nelson can collect pieces of used gum he finds at each location. The puzzles don't automatically approve the player's solution, even if the player provides the correct answer – Nelson must send the answer back to HQ where it is either approved or rejected. If the solution is approved, the player is given a score depending on how many hints he used and how many failed attempts he had (the latter is represented in taxpayer dollars), and an optional further explanation is provided on how the puzzle can be solved.

== Plot ==
The game begins as Agent Nelson Tethers, the sole member of the Puzzle Research Division of the FBI, is given his first field assignment. The factory that produces the erasers used by the White House has stopped production; any attempts to contact the factory are met with bizarre puzzles. Tethers must visit the factory in Scoggins, Minnesota and get it running again.

In Scoggins, Tethers is told that the factory was closed after an unidentified accident, and that the factory's foreman, Isaac Davner, hasn't been seen since. Further investigation is impossible because the factory is sealed by a complex lock requiring three keys.

Tethers' search for the keys and for additional clues to Isaac's whereabouts is hindered by mysterious gnome-like creatures called the Hidden People by the townspeople. The Hidden People seem to be supported by a local lodge called the Brotherhood of Scoggins. The lodge head, Bjorn, tells Tethers that the Hidden People have “chosen” Isaac, though he is unable to explain exactly what that means.

Finally, Tethers gains entry to the factory. Inside, he finds Isaac, driven mad by puzzles given to him by the Hidden People. Tethers tries to rescue Isaac, but the Hidden People drag Isaac off before he can be saved. The factory starts back up soon afterward. Back in Washington, Tethers is congratulated for his work, and is reminded that the disappearance of Isaac is a matter for local law enforcement.

The story continues in the sequel, Puzzle Agent 2.

== Reception ==
Reception

Aggregate score
| Aggregator | Score |
|---|---|
| Metacritic | 70/100 |

Puzzle Agent received "generally favorable" reviews, according to review aggregator Metacritic.
