= Idle Thumbs =

Podcast network

- Website type: video game culture; podcast
- Website: www.idlethumbs.net
- Commercial: Yes
- Registration: optional

Idle Thumbs is a video game culture website and podcast network founded in 2004.

Until May 2018, it published a weekly video game podcast of the same name hosted by various former and current video game journalists and developers including Chris Remo (formerly of Campo Santo and Double Fine Productions), Nick Breckon (formerly of Telltale Games), Jake Rodkin and Sean Vanaman (Valve formerly Campo Santo, and Telltale Games), Danielle Riendeau (Fanbyte.com, formerly Waypoint/VICE Gaming and Polygon), and James Spafford (Double Fine Productions, formerly Media Molecule).

The site currently hosts two ongoing podcasts and archives of several shows either discontinued or on indefinite hiatus. The active shows are Three Moves Ahead (a strategy game podcast hosted by Len Hafer) and Designer Notes (an interview podcast with game designers hosted by Soren Johnson and Adam Saltsman). Archived shows include the Idle Book Club (2012-2018), discussing a selection of modern and classic literature; Terminal7 (2013-2018), a Netrunner podcast hosted by Nels Anderson and Jesse Turner; Tone Control (2013-2018), where former "Thumb" regular Steve Gaynor interviews notable video game developers; Idle Weekend (2015-2018), a sister podcast to Idle Thumbs hosted by Danielle Riendeau and Rob Zacny; Important if True (2017-2018), in which Remo, Rodkin, and Breckon discuss societal oddities; Something True (2017-2019), a historical podcast about strange stories hosted by Alex Ashby and Duncan Fyfe; DOTA Today (2013-2015), a Dota 2 podcast hosted by Vanaman, Rodkin and Brad Muir; and Every Game in This City (2019-2021), a podcast about playing well together in different cities around the world. The network also launched a series of television viewing podcasts such as Twin Peaks Rewatch (2014-2017), The End of Mad Men (2015), and True Detective Weekly (2015).

The most recent run of the main Idle Thumbs podcast was the result of a successful Kickstarter crowdfunding campaign that concluded in March 2012. The campaign reached its $30,000 goal within two hours and concluded with a funding total of $136,924.

== History ==
The site was an outlet for game news and op-ed pieces from 2004 until a hiatus in 2007. Three former staff writers, Chris Remo (then-Editor at Large for Gamasutra), Nick Breckon (then of Shacknews), and Jake Rodkin (then of Telltale Games), revived the site as a podcast in late 2008. The show was unstructured in format, with each host discussing recent games played and musing about game design. They were frequently joined by Steve Gaynor (then of 2K Marin) who would replace Nick Breckon after the latter's move to Bethesda Softworks. This second incarnation of the podcast also often featured Sean Vanaman of Telltale Games, who eventually became a core member. The podcast officially ended in mid-2010 after Remo took a job at Boston-based Irrational Games, with the show's then-final episode recorded live at the 2010 Penny Arcade Expo.

=== Kickstarter campaign ===
In February 2012—following Remo's return to San Francisco—Remo, Rodkin, and Vanaman started a Kickstarter crowdfunding campaign to raise $30,000 to revive the podcast in a more stable manner. They collaborated with Blendo Games to develop the sequel to Gravity Bone entitled Thirty Flights of Loving, which would be offered as a reward to backers. Remo composed the game's original soundtrack. The campaign met its goal within two hours and tripled it by the end of the first week. It ultimately raised $136,924, over four times the requested amount. At the time of its conclusion, it was the third-highest-earning video game project on Kickstarter.

=== Podcast relaunch and network ===
Shortly before the conclusion of the campaign, Troy Goodfellow of Three Moves Ahead podcast announced a partnership with Idle Thumbs, allowing the latter to host their content and forums. The same month, Idle Thumbs announced it would be launching its own monthly book club podcast featuring Remo, Rodkin, and Vanaman. The first selection was The Sense of an Ending by British author Julian Barnes. The flagship weekly Idle Thumbs podcast returned alongside a new temporary front page design on July 19, 2012, with the episode "The Dance of the Treasure Goblin."

=== Peter Molydeux Game Jam ===
In March 2012, Idle Thumbs helped organize a game jam called "What Would Molydeux?", with Anna Kipnis of Double Fine Productions and Patrick Klepek of Giant Bomb. The theme of the game jam is to create games based on ideas of the Twitter account @petermolydeux, a parody of Peter Molyneux. The initial San Francisco event inspired over 30 other local events across the world, including one in Brighton, UK which was attended by Molyneux. The events attracted over 900 participants and produced 280 games over two days.

=== Return of Nick Breckon ===
In March 2013, Breckon returned to San Francisco to take a writing position at Telltale Games and resumed his hosting duties with Idle Thumbs. Shortly thereafter, Idle Thumbs celebrated its 100th podcast, in which Rodkin discovered that he was the only host to appear in every episode. Vanaman and Breckon also founded a new podcast in May dedicated to discussing the intricacies of DOTA 2 and Lords Management.

=== Hiatus ===
In 2018, Rodkin and Vanaman's game development company Campo Santo was acquired by Valve, relocating from San Francisco to Bellevue, Washington and geographically separating the hosts. No new episodes of the main Idle Thumbs podcast have been produced since 2018.

== Shows ==
Name	Hosts	First episode	Final episode
Idle Thumbs	Chris Remo, Jake Rodkin, Nick Breckon, James Spafford	October 10, 2008	May 12, 2018
Three Moves Ahead	Len Hafer	February 24, 2009	—
The Idle Book Club	Chris Remo, Sarah Argodale	September 14, 2012	January 21, 2018
Dota Today	Sean Vanaman, Nick Breckon, Brad Muir	May 29, 2013	March 24, 2015
Tone Control	Steve Gaynor	October 15, 2013	June 15, 2018
Terminal7	Nels Anderson, Jesse Turner	November 11, 2013	August 29, 2018
Twin Peaks Rewatch	Chris Remo, Jake Rodkin	October 8, 2014	September 16, 2017
Designer Notes	Soren Johnson, Adam Saltsman	October 30, 2014	—
The End of Mad Men	Chris Remo, Jake Rodkin, Sean Vanaman	April 6, 2015	May 20, 2015
True Detective Weekly	Chris Remo, Jake Rodkin, Sean Vanaman	June 19, 2015	August 11, 2015
Esports Today	Rob Zacny	August 5, 2015	March 10, 2016
Idle Weekend	Danielle Riendeau, Rob Zacny	December 11, 2015	August 1, 2018
Playscape: Los Angeles	Teddy Dief	March 24, 2016	June 13, 2016
Important If True	Chris Remo, Jake Rodkin, Nick Breckon	February 16, 2017	April 15, 2018
Something True	Duncan Fyfe, Alex Ashby	March 28, 2017	September 3, 2019
Every Game in This City	Stephanie Boluk, Yang Jing, Alexandra Lee, Lee Shang Lun, Patric LeMieux, Felania Liu, Peter Nelson, Will Partin, Goldie Bartlett, Jey Biddulph, Laura E. Hall, Amani Naseem, Chad Toprak, Douglas Wilson	August 5, 2019	December 5, 2021
The Cutdown	Derek Lieu, Ric Thomas	May 24, 2019	September 24, 2021
