= Olly Moss =

English graphic artist

- Born: Oliver Jonathan Moss; 24 January 1987 (age 39); Winchester, Hampshire, England
- Education: University of Birmingham
- Style: Graphic design
- Website: www.ollymoss.com

Oliver Jonathan Moss (born 24 January 1987) is an English graphic artist, best known for his reimagining of movie posters. His work has been released by Mondo and is regularly featured in Empire magazine.

== Background and early life ==
Moss graduated from the University of Birmingham in 2008, having studied literature. Moss is a regular guest on the IGN UK and A Life Well Wasted podcasts. His illustration work began as a hobby, but showing his work on the Internet led to commissions and helped him to make his way through university by creating popular T-shirt designs on Threadless. He initially wanted to pursue a career in advertising but ended up enjoying graphic design and illustration.

== Career ==
Moss was commissioned by Marvel Entertainment executives Craig Kyle and Kevin Feige to create a poster for the cast of Thor. His other notable works include the cover artwork for the 2011 video game Resistance 3, which prompted a trailer to be created in a similar style. He also created the covers for the first digital copies of J. K. Rowling's Harry Potter book series, as well as a seven-part series of prints based on each book. In February 2013, to coincide with the 85th Academy Awards, Moss released a poster wherein eighty-five years' worth of Best Picture winners are represented with individual Oscar statuettes.

Moss's Star Wars original trilogy posters

=== Star Wars posters ===
Along with creating custom posters for works such as Dirty Harry, The Evil Dead, RoboCop, My Neighbor Totoro, and the Star Trek episode "The Trouble with Tribbles", Moss is most notable for his set of posters based on the original Star Wars trilogy. In the posters, Star Wars, The Empire Strikes Back, and Return of the Jedi are represented using imagery from each film within coloured silhouettes of C-3PO, Boba Fett, and Darth Vader, respectively. The posters were released in 2010 with a limit of 400 copies each, at a price of $50 each. In 2021, it was reported that a complete set of the three posters was listed on eBay for a price of $10,900.00.

=== Campo Santo and Firewatch ===
In September 2013, Moss and Mark of the Ninja lead designer Nels Anderson joined with former Telltale Games employees Jake Rodkin and Sean Vanaman to found Campo Santo. Moss worked closely on the design and was art director for the studio's first release, Firewatch. Inspired by the iconic style of the 1960s National Park posters, Firewatch echoes Moss’s graphic style. Moss was responsible for the game’s colour and lighting scheme and handled all of the environment design language, and he also created various logos and designs for the props in Firewatch.

=== Valve ===
Moss left Campo Santo in 2016, and is now working for Valve. He worked as an artist on Half-Life: Alyx, and co-wrote with Sean Vanaman the August 23, 2017 issue of the Rick and Morty comic series, for the one-shot "Hitler Baby, One More Time".
