= Razmig Mavlian =

Armenian-Canadian artist and animator

- Other name: Raz
- Occupations: Artist, animator, video game developer, musician

Razmig Mavlian is an Armenian-Canadian artist, animator, video game developer, and musician. His nickname "Raz" was the inspiration for the name of the main character in Psychonauts. He currently is a concept artist at Oculus VR.

== Career ==
Razmig Mavlian began his career primarily as an animator at LucasArts, working on a variety of games. He was an artist and animator there for six years, before leaving LucasArts for Double Fine Productions.

At Double Fine, he began as artist and animator on Psychonauts. Creative Director Tim Schafer named the game's protagonist Raz, after the nickname of Mavlian. Mavlian started two webcomics called Epic Saga and Happy Funnies, which were created as part of Double Fine Comics. During the production of Brütal Legend, Double Fine's webmaster, Klint Honeychurch, created a flash game based on Epic Saga, called Epic Saga: Extreme Fighter with artwork by Mavlian. Razmig Mavlian wrote all the jokes for it too, including how it ends.

He composed the music for the next two flash games by Double Fine, My Game About Me: Olympic Challenge and Tasha's Game. The soundtracks for these games were released as an online compilation, along with the music from Double Fine's other flash game, Host Master and the Conquest of Humor, and bonus tracks consisting of 1990's sound chip renditions of Psychonauts songs. The Double Fine Action Arcade Soundtrack compilation was released on iTunes and eMusic.

Amnesia Fortnight 2014 saw Razmig Mavlian voicing the main character "Big Leg" for Pendleton Ward's game "Little Pink Best Buds".

In 2016, Razmig Mavlian began working for Oculus VR as concept artist for the virtual reality sculpting tool Oculus Medium.

== Recognition ==
Epic Saga: Extreme Fighter had nothing to do with Brütal Legend. The misunderstanding came from being publicized roughly at the same time as Brütal Legend. Due to this association with Brütal Legend, Epic Saga: Extreme Fighter received more attention than usual for a free online flash game. The press release of Epic Saga: Extreme Fighter satirized the rumors of the at-the-time unannounced Brütal Legend, stating that the game starred a "barbaric hero in an epic fantasy world, fighting his way from Rock and Roll Hell to Rock and Roll Heaven".

It was reported on by Kotaku, Joystiq, and 1UP.com. Michael McWhertor of Kotaku stated "If you've got the skills to take on this series of truly extreme fighters, you won't be disappointed. The ending is nothing short of spectacular".

== Games ==
- 1998 Star Wars: Rogue Squadron 3D, 3D art (LucasArts)
- 2000 Escape From Monkey Island, 3D animation (LucasArts)
- 2000 Star Wars Episode I: Jedi Power Battles, 3D art, animation (LucasArts)
- 2002 Star Wars: Jedi Starfighter, pre-rendered 3D animation (LucasArts)
- 2003 RTX Red Rock, co-designer (LucasArts)
- 2005 Psychonauts, art, animation (Double Fine)
- 2007 Epic Saga: Extreme Fighter, art, animation, writing (Double Fine)
- 2008 My Game About Me: Olympic Challenge, music (Double Fine)
- 2008 Tasha's Game, music (Double Fine)
- 2008 Brütal Legend, art (Double Fine)
- 2010 Costume Quest, additional concept art (Double Fine)
- 2011 Iron Brigade, additional concept art (Double Fine)
- 2011 Sesame Street: Once Upon a Monster, art, storyboards (Double Fine)
- 2012 Kinect Party, art, design (Double Fine)
- 2014 Hack 'N' Slash, environment artist (Double Fine)
- 2014 Spacebase DF-9, concepts (Double Fine)
- 2014 Costume Quest 2, art (Double Fine)
- 2015 Massive Chalice, concept art (Double Fine)
- 2016 Headlander, concept art (Double Fine)
