= Nathan Stapley =

Artist

- Occupation: Artist

Nathan Stapley is an American artist. He was the lead artist on Double Fine's adventure game Broken Age and has worked on Psychonauts and Psychonauts 2.

== Career ==
Nathan Stapley started his career at LucasArts, where he worked as an artist on Indiana Jones and the Infernal Machine and Star Wars Episode I: Racer. He left LucasArts to work as an artist at LucasArts alumnus Tim Schafer's studio, Double Fine Productions.

While at Double Fine, Stapley created a comic called My Comic About Me, which led to the development of a free Flash sports game parody called My Game About Me: Olympic Challenge. This game was developed by Klint Honeychurch with art by Stapley.

He was working on Broken Age as the lead artist and has also been an artist on Psychonauts and Psychonauts 2. A poster he created was included as one of the reward tiers in the Broken Age Kickstarter campaign.

== Recognition ==
My Game About Me: Olympic Challenge received more attention than the average free online flash game.

The Broken Age (working title Double Fine Adventure) Kickstarter campaign became the most successful project on the platform at the time, attracting more record backers than any prior effort in the site's history.

== Games ==
Year	Title	Role	Developer
1999	Indiana Jones and the Infernal Machine	Artist	LucasArts
1999	Star Wars Episode I: Racer	Artist	LucasArts
2000	Escape from Monkey Island	Artist	LucasArts
2002	Star Wars: Bounty Hunter	Artist	LucasArts
2005	Psychonauts	Artist	Double Fine
2008	My Game About Me: Olympic Challenge	Lead artist	Double Fine
2009	Brütal Legend	Artist	Double Fine
2010	Costume Quest	Artist	Double Fine
2013	Broken Age	Lead artist	Double Fine
2021	Psychonauts 2	Artist	Double Fine
