= Psychonauts 2 =

2021 platform video game

- Key artwork by Nathan Stapley
- Developer: Double Fine
- Publisher: Xbox Game Studios (Note: Self published on Steam following Double Fine's split from Xbox Game Studios in 2026)
- Director: Tim Schafer
- Producers: Andy Alamano; Gavin Carter; Naoko Takamoto
- Designers: Seth Marinello; Zak McClendon
- Programmer: Kee Chi
- Artist: Lisette Titre-Montgomery
- Writer: Tim Schafer
- Composer: Peter McConnell
- Engine: Unreal Engine 4
- Platforms: PlayStation 4; Windows; Xbox One; Xbox Series X/S; Linux; macOS
- Release: PS4, Windows, Xbox One, Xbox Series X/S; August 25, 2021; Linux, macOS; May 24, 2022
- Genres: Platform, action-adventure
- Mode: Single-player

Psychonauts 2 is a 2021 platform game developed by Double Fine and published by Xbox Game Studios. The game was announced at The Game Awards 2015 ceremony, and released on August 25, 2021 for PlayStation 4, Windows, Xbox One and Xbox Series X/S, and on May 24, 2022 for Linux and macOS.

Like the game's predecessor, the player controls Raz, a young acrobat who is training to become a Psychonaut, a member of an international task force that uses their psychic abilities to stop those that perform nefarious deeds with their own psychic forces. Within Psychonauts 2, which directly follows the events of the interstitial virtual reality game, Psychonauts in the Rhombus of Ruin (2017), the Psychonauts try to learn who was really behind the capture of their leader, unveiling a deep mystery surrounding the organization's founding and Raz's family history. To uncover the mystery, Raz enters the mindscapes of various characters to discover clues. Within these mindscapes, Raz can perform a variety of new and returning psychic abilities that allow him to maneuver through their often-twisted minds and battle the mental creatures they produce.

The original Psychonauts, released in 2005, was met with critical praise, but failed to sell well and was considered a commercial failure for several years after its first release. Double Fine and game director Tim Schafer had expressed the desire to create a sequel to Psychonauts, but the financial demand of developing the game stalled any serious attempt for several years. Double Fine regained the intellectual property to Psychonauts from Majesco in 2011, allowing them to rerelease the game on modern platforms, which saw strong sales and increased demand from players for a sequel. Double Fine sought to acquire part of its financial capital to fund the developments of Psychonauts 2 through a US$3.3 million crowd-funding and investment drive through Fig, launched simultaneously with the game's announcement. The campaign raised nearly $4 million by the beginning of 2016. While Psychonauts 2 was initially to be published by Starbreeze Studios under a publishing-only deal, Starbreeze fell into bankruptcy in 2018. By 2019, Microsoft acquired Double Fine as part of Xbox Games Studios as well as securing the publishing rights from Starbreeze. This acquisition allowed Double Fine to complete the game as envisioned, rather than dropping the planned content.

Upon release, Psychonauts 2 received generally positive reviews from critics, with many feeling it lived up to the quality of its predecessor. Praise was directed at its platforming, level design, visuals, writing, and tone, while criticism fell on aspects of the gameplay and the boss battles.

== Gameplay ==
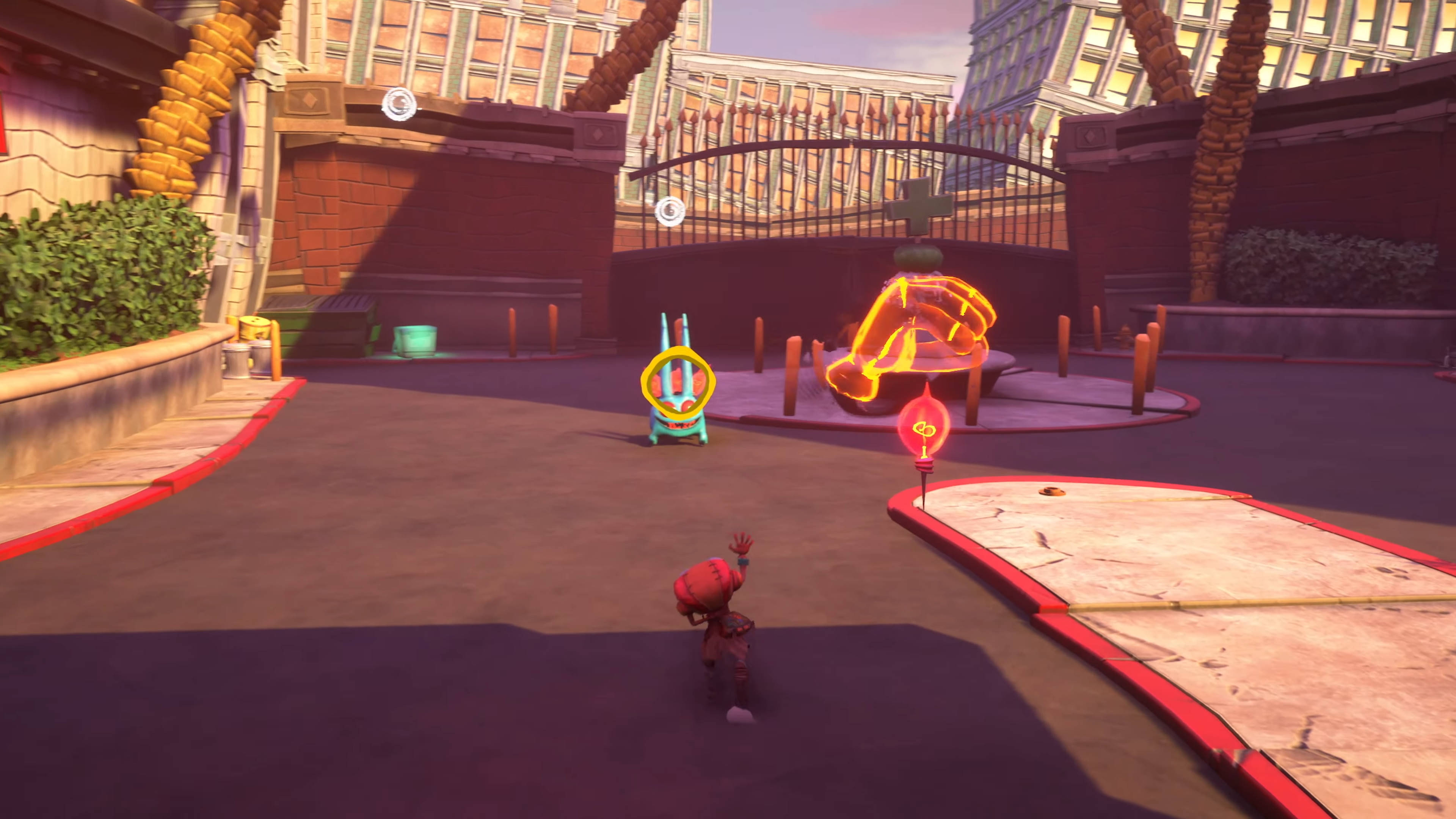
Raz's powers and combat moves are used to defeat enemies. Depicted, telekinesis is used to throw an object at an enemy.

Psychonauts 2 is a single player platform game played in a third-person view. The player controls Razputin "Raz" Aquato, a ten-year-old child runaway of a circus acrobat family, who possesses powerful psychic abilities that allow him to delve into the minds of others. Raz is a new graduate of the Psychonauts, an agency of psychic spies. His acrobatic skills are used to deftly navigate environments in the game; he can run, jump, scale walls and platforms, and slide along rails, but cannot swim due to a family curse. Raz hones his abilities into an array of psychic powers that allow him to use pyrokinesis, levitation, telekenesis and so on. Several powers return from the original game, with additions such as Mental Connection, which Raz uses to tether between floating points. Up to four powers can be assigned at once, and are swapped out via a pop-up interface.

Each of the game's levels exist in their respective character's consciousness. Levels often require completion of a goal to resolve the character's psychological issues. Environmental design in each level gives insight into the character's life experience and mental state. In one level, Raz enters the mind of a character crippled by alcoholism. The level design alludes to the character's struggles, with beer bottles used as set pieces. Another character develops a gambling addiction; their level is set in a warped casino-hospital amalgam. (Note: The addiction is caused by Raz's rash actions. Earlier, Raz had tampered with the character's neural pathways. The level requires Raz to correct his mistakes.) Combat foes in the levels are typically personifications of mental phenomena. Censors attack Raz with stamps, flying Regrets drop weights, and Enablers buff other enemies' health and attacks. In fights, Raz combines his abilities with melee attacks and dodges. When Raz falls through a level or depletes his health, he respawns at a checkpoint. Several levels culminate in a boss battle.

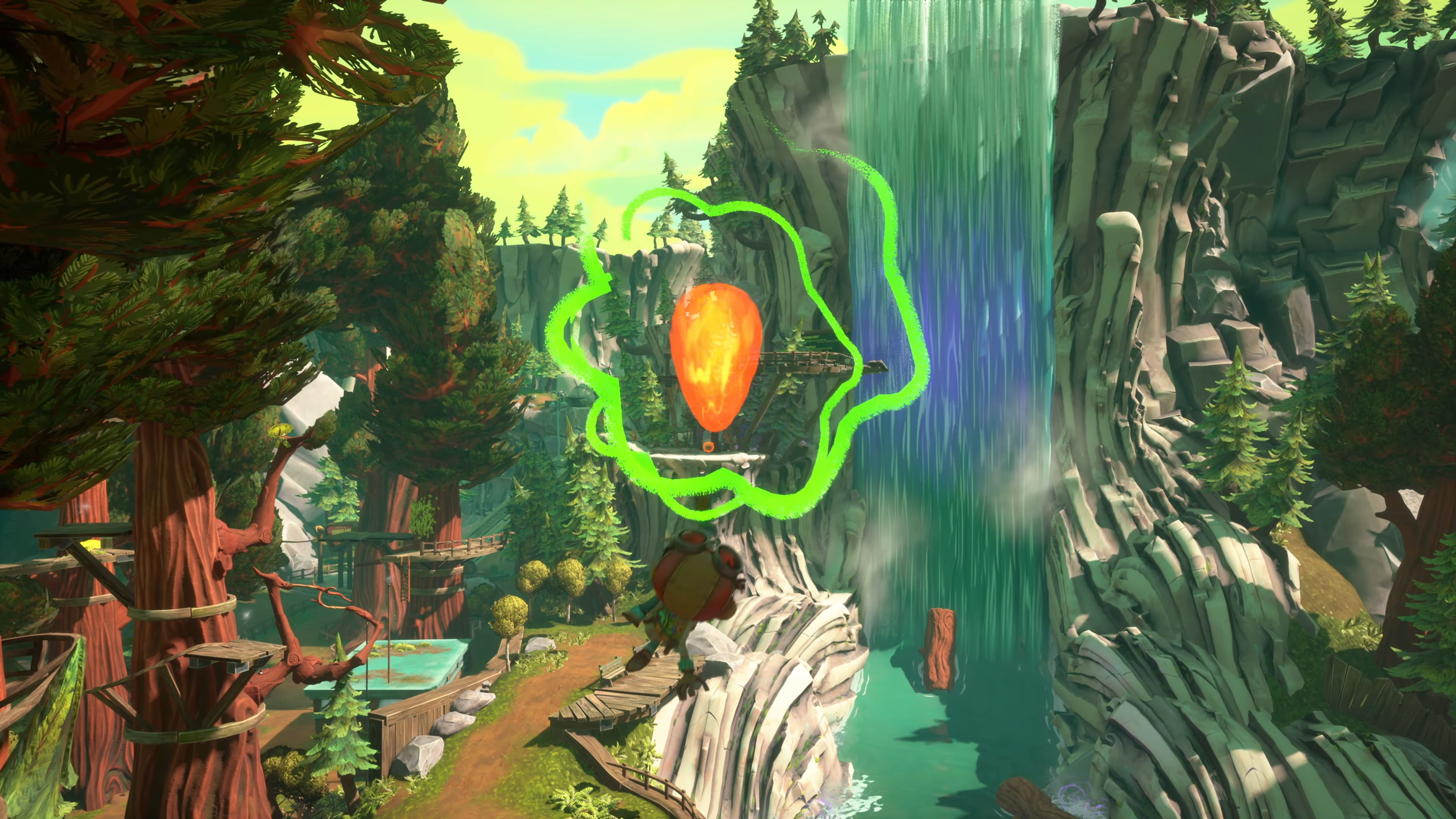
Raz using levitation to traverse the Quarry

When not progressing the story, Raz can explore the four distinct hubs of a large overworld. He begins in the Motherlobe, a corporate building used as the Psychonauts' headquarters. Later, he can explore the surrounding areas: an open Quarry, the wooded Questionable Area? and the Green Needle Gulch swampland. Raz can interact with many of the world's characters, and complete side activities and scavenger hunts. Completed levels may be revisited. Across the levels and hubs, Raz amasses several collectible items, such as Figments, Memory Vaults and Nuggets of Wisdom. (Note: Collectibles have symbolic meanings: Figments represent a character's unfinished thoughts, Vaults unlock repressed memories, and Nuggets enlighten Raz and increase his rank.) Some items, such as PSI Cards, increase Raz's rank and unlock ability upgrades. In-game currency can be spent on Pins, which provide passive gameplay effects such as health kits, and other items.

== Synopsis ==
=== Setting ===
Psychonauts 2 is set in a fictional, alternate world in which psychic powers exist thanks to the fictional element Psitanium - a substance brought to the planet by several meteors. The Psychonauts are an international espionage agency focused on psychic peacekeeping, scientific research of the human mind, and the development of psychic-based technologies.

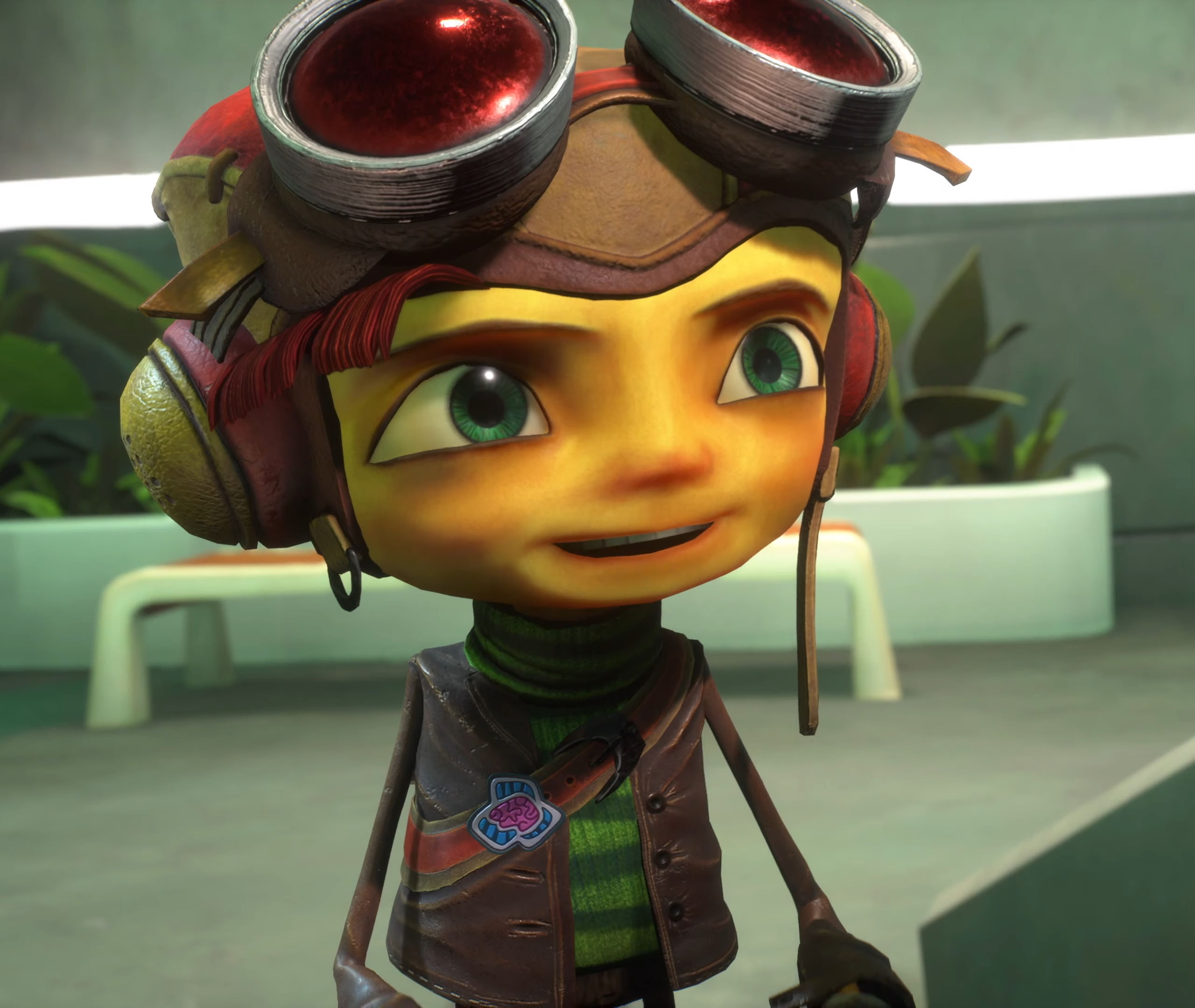
Razputin "Raz" Aquato

In Psychonauts, the player-character Razputin "Raz" Aquato is a young acrobat fascinated by the Psychonauts, but shunned by his family who fear his psychic abilities. He runs away and infiltrates Whispering Rock summer camp, a training facility for young Psychonaut recruits. While there, he helps to foil a plan by the demented Dr. Loboto and misguided Coach Oleander to steal the brains of his fellow campers and the Psychonaut agents Sasha Nein and Milla Vodello, while befriending Psychonauts founder Ford Cruller and Lili Zanotto, the daughter of the Grand Head of the Psychonauts, Truman Zanotto. Raz's father, Augustus, comes to accept Raz's goal of being a Psychonaut, revealing his own weak psychic abilities. Psychonauts in the Rhombus of Ruin follows immediately from the end of Psychonauts, where Raz joins Sasha, Milla, Coach and Lili to rescue Truman from being captured by Dr. Loboto.

=== Characters ===
In addition to returning characters from the previous games, Psychonauts 2 introduces the other founding members of the Psychonauts alongside Ford Cruller, known as the Psychic Six: Otto Mentallis, chief inventor who assists Nein and provides new psychic equipment; Compton Boole, who pioneered telepathy with animals; Bob Zanotto, uncle to Truman Zanotto and capable of communicating with plant life; Helmut Fullbear, Bob's husband and a psychic actor whose body was lost and his brain was kept in a jar for over 20 years, making him lose his five senses; and Cassie O'Pia, an author of the self-help book "Mindswarm" who is lost in a multiple personality disorder.

Additional Psychonauts staff at their headquarters, the Motherlobe, include Hollis Forsythe, Second Head of the Psychonauts, Nick Johnsmith, the only non-psychic member of the Psychonauts who works in the mailroom section, and a group of interns training to become agents. These interns include Samantha "Sam" Boole, elder sister of Dogen and granddaughter to Compton who can communicate with animals like her family; Adam Gette, the African-British keeper of the Psychonauts' history board who telekinetically powers yo-yos as a weapon; Morris Martinez, a radio aficionado who travels around via levitating wheelchair; Gisu Nerumen, an engineering ward to Otto and levitating skateboarder; Norma Natividad, a shrewd manipulator and talented pyrokinetic; and Lizzie Natividad, Norma's cryokinetic and moody younger sister.

Raz's family beyond Augustus are also introduced, including Augustus' wife and Raz's mother Donatella, older siblings Dion and Frazie, younger siblings Mirtala and Queepie, and their Nona, mother to Augustus.

=== Plot ===
After capturing Loboto and recovering Truman's comatose body, Raz joins the other Psychonauts inside Loboto's mind to learn his co-conspirator's identity, but they find his psyche secured against their efforts. However, Raz sees a vision of a woman whom Sasha identifies as Maligula, a cruel hydrokinetic who flooded and destroyed the nation of Grulovia's capital. Maligula was believed killed by the Psychic Six, but her followers, the Deluginists, have looked to necromancy to resurrect her. The senior agents suspect a double agent within the Psychonauts aided Loboto in kidnapping Truman.

At the Motherlobe, Hollis assigns Raz to work as an intern in the mail room under Nick. Raz finds Nick's brainless body and a key to a room at the Lady Luctopus Casino. During a training exercise, Raz uses his powers to convince Hollis to bring the interns on the mission. However, he inadvertently causes her to develop a gambling addiction and is forced to battle an incarnation of Lady Luctopus herself inside Hollis' mind to undo this to get the mission back on track. Inside the room, Raz finds evidence of the Deluginists and a slip of paper indicating Lili as the double agent.

Raz shows Lili the paper he found, but she refuses to believe it and runs off. To Raz's surprise, Truman reveals he is faking his coma and urges Raz to bring Ford Cruller to the Motherlobe and reconstitute his split personalities, as he holds the secret behind Maligula. Raz does so, along the way helping the other Psychic Six members with their mental traumas that developed after their fight with Maligula. Once Ford is whole, he explains that Maligula is actually Lucrecia "Lucy" Mux (née Galochio), the previously unknown seventh member of the Psychic Six, (once known as the "Psychic Seven") and Raz's grandaunt, who was in a romantic relationship with Ford after the death of her husband Gelsin. Lucy returned to Grulovia to quell an uprising, but under its leader Gzar Theodore Malik's abusive treatment, Lucy created the Maligula personality as a fight-or-flight response. However, Maligula went berserk and flooded the country, killing peaceful protestors led by her own sister Marona ''Nona'' Aquato and the latter's husband Lazarus ''Lazlo'' and forcing the Gzar and his family into exile. The Psychic Six defeated Maligula, but Ford secretly spared her life and used one of Otto's inventions, the Astralathe, a device that makes permanent alterations to the mind, to bury the Maligula personality deep inside Lucy's mind and make her believe she was Marona. Ford also altered the memories of Marona's son Augustus to accept Lucrecia as his mother. Finally, Ford used the Astralathe to split his own mind to forget about Lucy as he mourned for her. Raz, horrified by the revelation, runs off to warn his family, but Ford warns that the family's memories will unravel and they might attack her, triggering the Maligula personality in the process.

Ford and Raz find Nona in the nearby Green Needle Gulch, home of the Psychic Six, where the Astralathe is kept, as Nona shows signs of remembering her time as Lucy. Ford determines that with the Psychic Six's help, they can use the Astralathe to create a further hole in Nona's mind to banish the Maligula personality permanently. Within Nona's mind, they learn that she had been already recalling elements of Lucy, and was the one to convince Raz to go to Whispering Rock in her subconscious as an indirect means to call for the Psychonauts' help. As Ford and Raz prepare to banish Maligula, Raz is suddenly removed from Nona's mind by Truman, who was called by suspicious intern Norma. Finding Truman's actions suspicious, Raz and Lili enter his mind and discover his brain is actually that of Nick, who is revealed to be Gristol Malik, Gzar Theodore's son. Gristol posed as Nick to infiltrate the Psychonauts and get revenge for his family's downfall. He instituted a plan to have Loboto replace Truman's brain with his, using Truman's position to revive Maligula, destroy the Psychonauts, and remake Grulovia.

The other Psychonauts arrive too late to prevent Maligula's reawakening. Torn by the confusion, Maligula lashes out and attacks the area, forming a storm that swarms Green Needle Gulch. Raz, Lili, and Norma are the only ones lucky enough to escape. As Lili leaves to find Truman's brain, Raz races back to his family, now aware of the truth, who assist Raz in reaching Maligula with an advanced acrobat technique and entering her mind. Raz battles the Maligula personality with the other interns, summoned by Norma, weakening her until Nona can emerge. She and Raz combine their powers to seal Maligula into the depths created by the Astralathe. In the aftermath, Nona is pardoned and reconnects with Ford, Truman's brain is restored, Gristol is imprisoned for ''therapy'', Loboto escapes to retrieve his child from Whispering Rock, and Raz and the interns graduate to become junior agents.

== Development ==
=== Background ===
Double Fine's first title as a studio was Psychonauts, released in 2005. The title was considered a commercial failure, but was highly praised by critics for its characters and writing and gained a cult following. In the years following its release, fans and game journalists urged Tim Schafer, CEO of Double Fine and principal creative lead on the game, to develop a sequel to the title.

Schafer had expressed interest in working on the Psychonauts franchise again, with the company having envisioned larger story arcs for the game's characters over the course of its development. The development of the sequel would require a publisher that was interested in the game, and Double Fine approached publishers with the idea; Schafer said that in these pitches, he pointed out the large number of both legitimate sales through digital distribution and through the illegitimate means of software piracy.

After Double Fine's success with the concurrent development and publishing of several smaller games, such as Costume Quest and Iron Brigade, Schafer felt more comfortable about embarking on a sequel, knowing that it need not obstruct the creation of any newer properties. Despite this, the publishers continued to turn down the idea. Some called the concept too creative or too obscure, according to Schafer. For others, with whom Schafer said he had good relations, the deals they offered did not fit with the scale Double Fine had planned for the game.

In February 2012, Markus Persson, at the time the owner of Mojang, made a public offer to fund a sequel to Schafer through Twitter. Later that day, a company representative for Double Fine stated that Persson and Schafer were discussing the possibility, without further affirmation. Persson noted that the anticipated costs that Double Fine would need would be an estimated $18 million, far exceeding what was initially expected to fund and cautioned fans to avoid hyping the funding possibility. Persson and Schafer met at the Game Developers Conference in March 2012; no definitive plans were made for funding a sequel, however. In February 2013, Persson officially stated that he was no longer directly trying to fund the sequel, commenting that he did not "have the time at the moment to even try to get educated enough to make an 18 million dollar deal", though would be open to the idea at a later time after he left game development; Persson did note other potential investors had stepped forward to help any such effort.

=== Announcement and fundraising ===
At the 2015 Game Awards, Schafer announced Double Fine's plans to work on Psychonauts 2 using a crowdfunding campaign through Fig. The company sought $3.3 million in funding for the game, which represented approximately one-third of the planned development costs, and would augment money being put in by Double Fine and a third-party investor. Schafer noted that while the amount was the same that they had raised for their Broken Age Kickstarter, which by the time of its release had significantly overrun its budget, he felt the studio was in a better position to manage the costs and processes necessary to deliver Psychonauts 2 on schedule. Schafer noted that this funding approach — bringing in money from multiple investors instead of from a single publisher — is similar to the approach taken by the movie industry, and further, that the use of crowdfunding can alleviate some of the traditional risks associated with investment, being an effective means of proving public interest in a title.

Mere days after the announcement of the Psychonauts 2 campaign, Double Fine announced the development of Psychonauts in the Rhombus of Ruin, a publisher-funded virtual reality game for the PlayStation VR. The game is a smaller standalone chapter that serves as a bridge between the original game and its sequel, featuring Raz and the other psychonauts rescuing Truman Zanotto, tying into the conclusion of Psychonauts.

=== Production ===
During the campaign, Schafer confirmed that in addition to voice actors, several team members who worked on the original game would return for the sequel, including Erik Wolpaw as writer, Peter Chan and Scott Campbell as artists, and Peter McConnell as the composer. Wolpaw ultimately did not contribute to Psychonauts 2, owing to scheduling conflicts with his commitments to Half-Life: Alyx. 2 Player Productions, a video production company who had previously worked with Double Fine to document the development of Broken Age, would be similarly documenting the creation of Psychonauts 2. Double Fine planned to use Unreal Engine 4 to develop the sequel, allowing them to save time and money that would otherwise be spent developing a custom game engine, as they had done in the past.

The campaign reached its target funding goal with five days left in its 38-day campaign. Upon completion, a total of $3,829,024 had been raised from 24,109 backers, with about $1,874,000 (48%) coming from those who opted to invest in the game compared to those who chose the more traditional reward-based options. Some of this funding was tied up in process with the Security and Exchange Commission to authorize Fig's use of unaccredited investors; Fig during this time covered Double Fine's development costs from their own capital. The matter was resolved by September 2016, assuring Double Fine will receive the amount funded or invested.

In February 2016, Zak McClendon, who had previously worked as design director at 2K Marin and Harmonix announced he had been hired as lead designer for Psychonauts 2.

In February 2017, it was announced that Starbreeze Studios had invested $8 million to help digitally publish the game across all platforms. They would recoup the investment by gaining 85% of the profit on sales, after the Fig investors are accounted for, until it is recovered, and then take 60% beyond that. The investment only affected the distribution, as Double Fine retains all control on the intellectual property and the development process.

Double Fine had originally planned on a 2018 release for the title, but announced in December 2017 that with the game in full development and their planned roadmap towards release completed, they did not expect to release the game until at least 2019. Double Fine premiered the game's first full trailer at The Game Awards 2018 in December 2018. Psychonauts 2 was in alpha at this time.

By June 2019 Double Fine had been acquired by Microsoft as part of Xbox Game Studios. Microsoft purchased the publishing rights for the game from Starbreeze for $13.2 million. Despite the sale, Double Fine stated that Psychonauts 2 would still be released on all previously announced platforms (not being exclusive to Microsoft platforms). The Microsoft acquisition allowed Double Fine to pay back the Fig investors earlier at a 139% return and increasing subsequent revenue-based return on investments from 70 to 85%. Schafer said in a 2020 interview that prior to Microsoft's acquisition, they were at a point that they cut the boss fights out of the game due to lack of funds, but were able to re-add them afterward.

=== Release ===
In July 2019, Double Fine announced that they had delayed the game's release until 2020, wanting to make sure they make the game as good as players are expecting. Double Fine announced in July 2020 that the game was further delayed to 2021, which will allow for an Xbox Series X-optimized version to be released as well. A release date for the game was officially announced at E3 2021. Double Fine announced on Twitter that the game had gone gold on August 6, 2021. On August 23, 2021, Double Fine revealed that the macOS and Linux versions had been delayed to an unannounced future date. Both versions were eventually released on May 24, 2022.

Double Fine, along with 2 Player Productions, documented the development of Psychonauts 2, and released a documentary, Double Fine PsychOdyssey, for free on YouTube in February 2023.

=== Voice cast ===
Most of the game's original voice actors from Psychonauts returned to voice their characters, notably Richard Horvitz and Nikki Rapp as the voices of Raz and Lili respectively. New to Psychonauts 2 includes Jack Black, who has worked on previous Double Fine games, as Helmut Fullbear, and Elijah Wood, who also had provided voicework with Black in Broken Age, as Nick Johnsmith. As an easter egg casting, Rikki Simons voices the embodiment of one of Raz's powers; Horvitz and Simons had previously voiced the characters Zim and GIR in the animated show Invader Zim. Kimberly Brooks, who voiced Hollis Forsythe, won a BAFTA Award for Performer in a Supporting Role for her work on Psychonauts 2.

== Reception ==
Reception

Aggregate scores
Aggregator	Score
Metacritic	PC: 89/100; PS4: 87/100; XONE: 91/100; XBSX: 87/100
OpenCritic	89/100; 97% Critics Recommend

Review scores
Publication	Score
Electronic Gaming Monthly	4/5
Game Informer	9/10
GameSpot	9/10
GamesRadar+	4.5/5
IGN	8/10
The Guardian	5/5

Game critics considered Psychonauts 2 a successful sequel worthy of its long wait. Reviews for most platforms were "generally favorable" according to review aggregator Metacritic, while the Xbox One version received "universal acclaim". The story and character writing was praised for its depth, humor and treatment of serious themes with finesse. Further, the examination of mental health issues was praised for its warmth and sensitivity.

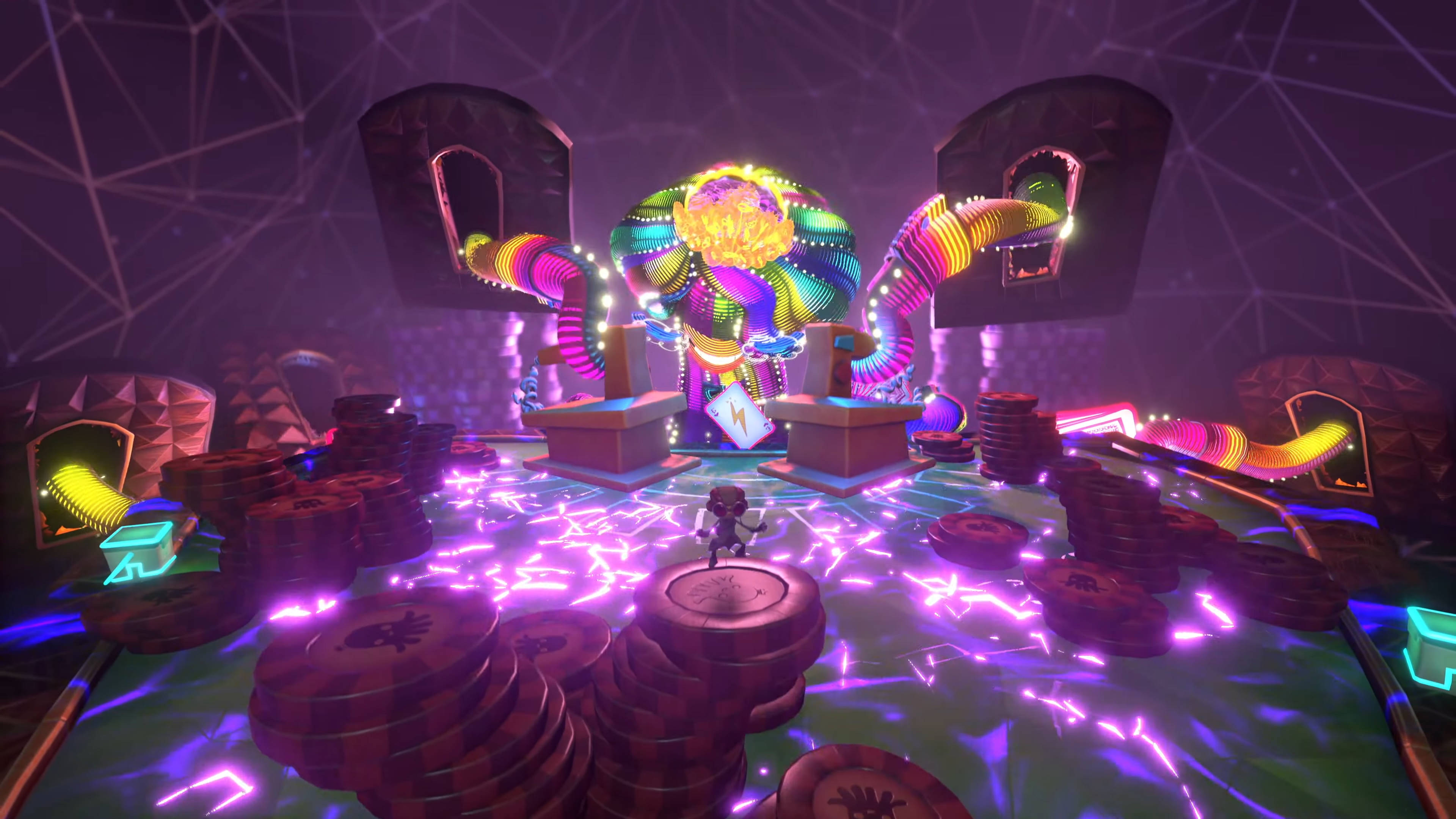
The art style of Psychonauts 2 received wide acclaim.

Creativity in level design and the colorful art style were widely applauded. Criticisms were leveled at the combat, boss fights and upgrade systems. Pure Xbox considered the game one of 2021's best and among the "greatest sequels ever made". Ars Technica called it a strong Game of the Year contender and "one of the best video games [they had] ever played". GamesRadar and The Guardian considered it a standout in the platforming genre, while The Daily Telegraph called the game a "straight-up classic". GameSpot felt the game was an "astonishing achievement" and Double Fine's magnum opus.

Wide praise was given to the narrative's quality. Its interspersion of sharp, witty humor with well-paced story beats and a delicate treatment of complex themes resonated with multiple critics. Ars Technica felt the writing "shines in every dimension". Gaming Bolt lauded the writing's charm and humor despite its heavier subtext. Polygon and Telegraph noted greater maturity in the game's themes over its predecessor; the former praised the handling of thematic complexities with "empathy and responsibility". Eurogamer highlighted the exploration of consequence and the ethics of invading one's psyche without informed consent. Reviewers noted this quandary manifested in an early level where Raz recklessly alters Hollis' psyche and must reconcile with the repercussions. Gaming Bolt considered Raz a strong lead character written with depth and relatability. The eclectic supporting cast was acclaimed by IGN as a testament to the strong writing. Horvitz and Black were considered by Video Games Chronicle (VGC) the standouts of a strong cast. Ars Technica called the performances wholly "pitch-perfect". Kotaku highlighted the cast's varied idiosyncrasies, supported by strong writing and performance. Hardcore Gamer lamented the interns' relegation to supporting roles in the wider narrative after a strong introduction and faulted the final act's pacing.

The narrative's capacity to harmonize its treatment of mental health issues with warmth, humor and sensitivity was applauded. Game Informer praised the artistic framing of mental health and Pure Xbox considered it the game's "most incredible achievement". The Guardian felt the portrayal was imperfect yet unpredictable. Gaming Bolt noted the pairing of "weighty themes" with humor and levity worked as the lightheartedness avoided irreverence. A balance between "caricature and empathy" was achieved, in Eurogamer's view, with the thematic portrayal simultaneously playful and sophisticated. Hardcore Gamer found the game able to explore its themes with greater substance than its predecessor. The themes, in VGC's assessment, were handled with "immense care" and eschewed cliché. Kotaku noted the examination of the human condition and its "challenging, painful, wonderful complexity". A positive and hopeful message amid the thematic gravitas was noted by Gaming Bolt. Ars Technica and Kotaku praised the humanization of the secondary antagonist Gristol Malik. The former cited ambiguity in "where villainy lives", and the latter found empathy in the depiction of Malik's turmoil. Polygon panned the late-game allegory of the "tragic eastern European state" as beholden to antiquated tropes.

The game's art and level design were both widely acclaimed.

The vibrant color palette and originality of the art and level design was acclaimed. Design and presentation descriptors ranged from "creative" and "imaginative" to "colorful" and "inventive". Stylistic influences cited by critics included the works of Tim Burton, Terry Gilliam, Sigmund Freud and Pixar. Game Informer lauded the aesthetics and Pure Xbox called the architecture and character models "beautifully designed". Stylistic distinction between the different levels was noted by Guardian, Kotaku and Polygon. The design was considered "abstract" and "absurdist" by GamesRadar. Telegraph and Ars Technica welcomed the atypical level environments, which subverted expectations by avoiding stock ice, lava and desert themes. Environmental storytelling was noted by reviewers to enrich story and character development. GameSpot observed that each level's art design reflected its respective character's mental disposition. Telegraph described the shifting story and gameplay elements as "delightfully disorientating". VGC posited that the levels would dominate a list of the all-time best in platform gaming. Game Informer observed occasional bygone textures, and IGN noted stiff facial animations and slight repetition in the level structure. While praising their creativity, Hardcore Gamer and EGM felt none of the levels eclipsed the original game's; both cited the acclaimed "Milkman Conspiracy" level among others. The music score was revered as "top-notch", "exuberant" and "incredible". The frequent musical motifs were noted by GameSpot to add cohesiveness between the different areas. Game Informer and Gaming Bolt found the music enhancive to each level's presentation. The cooking show level's soundtrack was highlighted by Eurogamer as some of the game's best music.

Some reviewers considered combat a notable weakness amid stronger elements. Others observed successful innovation on the original's combat. Negative gameplay descriptors ranged from "dated" and "fiddly" to "clunky". The limitation of having a maximum four abilities equipped at once was a common complaint. As foes were dispatched with different abilities, critics found the constant need to switch abilities disruptive to flow. Telegraph wrote the game lacks Ratchet and Clank's "pixel perfect precision" in character movement. Ars Technica felt overlong attack animations impeded fluidity. Gaming Bolt and Pure Xbox felt Raz's attacks lacked heft. The combat's intensity and pacing were praised by Hardcore Gamer. Kotaku likened combat scenarios to "mini-puzzles", solvable only with command of Raz's abilities. They felt constant ability swapping aided immersion and described gameplay as "responsive and smooth". Some critics felt the original's poor controls were largely corrected, with greater command of Raz's acrobatics. Electronic Gaming Monthly (EGM) said platforming achieved a "level of polish that feels modern", but that combat was merely functional. Ars Technica occasionally misjudged jumps and impassable ledges. Jump distance issues were broached by Game Informer and IGN as well, though both considered the gameplay largely satisfactory. Some boss fights disappointed GameSpot as repetitive strategies became a monotony; EGM felt the fights amplified combat problems, and that the tedium of waiting out attack patterns exemplified the underlying design's age. Unavoidable attacks and sparse battle checkpoints frustrated VGC. Design creativity in the other gameplay elements was not, according to GamesRadar, recaptured in the boss fights, and Eurogamer felt "rickety execution" slightly dampened their fun.

Reviewers praised much of the game's side content, but several faulted the upgrade systems. Gaming Bolt called the hub world a "joy to explore", with no disparity between the main plot and the side content. GamesRadar praised the world's visual design and the story vignettes players would enjoy discovering. The design was said by IGN to recapture the original game's "folksy feel". Hardcore Gamer complimented the world's breadth and enjoyed discovering its secrets. Because of their strong writing, Kotaku wanted to learn more about the supporting cast, whom VGC felt the side missions allowed to shine. GameSpot felt "natural intrigue" prompted exploration and that clever world design made it easy to navigate. They said character interactions deepened the world, typified by Raz's family exchanges. GamesRadar sought to navigate all possible dialogue paths with the ensemble. Ars Technica noted design cues taken from classic Nintendo games, with abundant side content to be discovered. They found that interactions with the supporting cast incentivized world exploration. GameSpot felt collectible objects were integrated effectively into level exploration. EGM posited that some players may tire of the backtracking necessary to complete all the areas. They saw little incentive to do so, as a fully upgraded Raz had no rewarding way to expend his powers. The upgrade system was considered laborious and redundant by some reviewers. EGM felt the upgrades added little to the meager combat. Ars Technica felt they supplemented Raz's abilities sufficiently. Some reviewers considered the pin system largely superfluous; the ability to equip only three at once was criticized as limiting by IGN and Kotaku. Both reviewers felt the pins were expensive and that many lacked use, and the former found the game's economy unbalanced.

=== Sales ===
Psychonauts 2 was revealed to be Double Fine's best-selling game, selling at least 1.7 million copies by April 1, 2022. This was stated by the game's art director Lisette Titre-Montgomery on Twitter shortly after her last day of employment at Double Fine.

=== Awards and accolades ===
Year	Award	Category	Result	Ref.
2021
2021	Golden Joystick Awards 2021	Best Storytelling	Nominated	
2021	Golden Joystick Awards 2021	Best Visual Design	Nominated	
2021	Golden Joystick Awards 2021	Xbox Game of the Year	Won	
2021	Golden Joystick Awards 2021	Ultimate Game of the Year	Nominated	
2021	The Game Awards 2021	Game of the Year	Nominated	
2021	The Game Awards 2021	Best Game Direction	Nominated	
2021	The Game Awards 2021	Best Narrative	Nominated	
2021	The Game Awards 2021	Best Art Direction	Nominated	
2021	The Game Awards 2021	Best Action/Adventure Game	Nominated	
2022	11th New York Game Awards	Big Apple Award for Best Game of the Year	Won	
2022	11th New York Game Awards	Herman Melville Award for Best Writing in a Game	Nominated	
2022	11th New York Game Awards	Statue of Liberty Award for Best World	Won	
2022	22nd Game Developers Choice Awards	Best Design	Nominated	
2022	22nd Game Developers Choice Awards	Best Narrative	Won	
2022	22nd Game Developers Choice Awards	Best Visual Art	Nominated	
2022	25th Annual D.I.C.E. Awards	Adventure Game of the Year	Nominated	
2022	25th Annual D.I.C.E. Awards	Outstanding Achievement in Original Music Composition	Nominated	
2022	25th Annual D.I.C.E. Awards	Outstanding Achievement in Story	Nominated	
2022	2022 SXSW Gaming Awards	Video Game of the Year	Nominated	
2022	Gayming Awards 2022	Game of the Year	Nominated	
2022	Gayming Awards 2022	Best LGBTQ+ Character Award (Helmut Fullbear & Bob Zanotto)	Nominated	
2022	33rd GLAAD Media Awards	Outstanding Video Game	Nominated	
2022	18th British Academy Games Awards	Animation	Nominated	
2022	18th British Academy Games Awards	Artistic Achievement	Nominated	
2022	18th British Academy Games Awards	Game Beyond Entertainment	Nominated	
2022	18th British Academy Games Awards	Music	Nominated	
2022	18th British Academy Games Awards	Narrative	Nominated	
2022	18th British Academy Games Awards	Technical Achievement	Nominated	
2022	18th British Academy Games Awards	Performer in a Supporting Role (Kimberly Brooks as Hollis Forsythe)	Won	
