= My Game About Me: Olympic Challenge =

2008 video game

- Logo of My Game About Me: Olympic Challenge
- Developer: Double Fine Productions
- Publisher: Double Fine Productions
- Designer: Klint Honeychurch
- Programmer: Klint Honeychurch
- Artist: Nathan Stapley
- Composer: Razmig Mavlian
- Platform: Browser
- Release: WW: January 9, 2008
- Genre: Sports
- Mode: Single-player

My Game About Me: Olympic Challenge is a free Flash sports game parody, designed by Klint Honeychurch with art by Nathan Stapley. The game was published by Double Fine Productions, and was originally playable on their website.

Like the webcomic it was based on, My Comic About Me, the game is centered on the semi-fictional life of Nathan Stapley. The game also features characters and locations from the comic.

== Gameplay ==
Screenshot of gameplay. Nathan is surfing in this level.

The game is a parody of sports games. The game consists of three mini-games, where the goal is to earn "Olympic" medals (gold, silver, copper, and platinum). The mini-games consist of eating, sleeping, and surfing while avoiding obstacles.

Along with Nathan, there are multiple characters to choose from, as well as characters that can be unlocked. In the eating and surfing mini-games, the player character is controlled via the arrow keys on the keyboard. In the surfing mini-game, the player must keep various objects from waking the chosen character from his sleep by clicking on the objects with the mouse.

== Soundtrack ==
Like Double Fine's other flash games, the game's soundtrack was created to mimic sound chips from the 1990s. The soundtrack of the game was composed by Razmig Mavlian. It was released as an online compilation, along with the music from Double Fine's other flash games, Tasha's Game and Host Master and the Conquest of Humor, and bonus tracks consisting of 1990's sound chip renditions of Psychonauts songs. The Double Fine Action Arcade Soundtrack compilation was released on iTunes and eMusic.

== Reception ==
Due to its association with Double Fine Productions, My Game About Me: Olympic Challenge received more attention than usual for a free online flash game. It was covered by Joystiq and Eurogamer. Eurogamer described it as an "exciting mini-game".
