= Tasha Sounart =

American animator, artist, video game designer, and writer

- Born: Tasha Wedeen
- Occupations: Animator, artist, game designer, writer

Tasha Sounart (née Wedeen, formerly Harris) is an American animator, artist, video game designer, and writer. She was the designer of Double Fine's adventure RPG Costume Quest. She is currently an Associate Creative Director of Theme Parks at Pixar.

== Career ==
Tasha Sounart began her career as an animator on A Bug's Life at Pixar. She was an animator there for nine years, before leaving Pixar for Double Fine Productions.

At Double Fine, she was the lead animator on Brütal Legend. During the period of time when Brütal Legend was left with no publisher, the head of the Double Fine studio, Tim Schafer, gave the project leads a chance to forget about what they were doing and come up with concepts and lead a team on smaller projects over the course of two weeks to develop prototype games, dubbed the "Amnesia Fortnight". Sounart pitched an idea that she had when she was at Pixar about a game centered on kids trick-or-treating on Halloween. The prototype game, Costume Quest, was pitched to publishers, and THQ greenlit the game with a $2 million budget.

Tasha Sounart has a webcomic called Tasha's Comic, which was created as part of Double Fine Comics. During the production of Brütal Legend, Double Fine's webmaster, Klint Honeychurch, created a flash game based on Tasha's Comic, called Tasha's Game with artwork and animation by Sounart.

On September 9, 2011 she posted her last comic on Double Fine's website and moved her comic to her personal blog because she had left Double Fine to rejoin Pixar as their lead franchise artist.

On December 19, 2012, Tasha Sounart announced that she was expecting her first child. She gave birth to a son named Colton on July 3, 2013.

== Recognition ==
Tasha Sounart won awards in the categories of art and for "Rising Star" at the Women in Gaming Awards at the 2011 Game Developers Conference.

Tasha's Game was nominated for "Best of Casual Gameplay 2008" in the platform browser games category from Jay is Games. Costume Quest was awarded the "Best Downloadable Game of the Year" at the 2010 Spike Video Game Awards and "PSN Game of the Year 2010" by PlayStation: The Official Magazine.

She animated the "When She Loved Me" sequence in Toy Story 2 which, co-director Ash Brannon said, is "an example of perfect animation casting". Brannon found it helpful that a woman animated Jessie, believing no one could have done it better than Sounart.

== Filmography ==
- 1998 A Bug's Life, additional character designer, animator (Pixar)
- 1999 Toy Story 2, additional storyboard artist, animator (Pixar)
- 2000 For the Birds, animator (Pixar)
- 2001 Monsters, Inc., animator (Pixar)
- 2003 Finding Nemo, animator (Pixar)
- 2006 Cars, animator (Pixar)
- 2012 Brave, marketing (Pixar)
- 2013 Monsters University, marketing (Pixar)
- 2015 Inside Out, marketing (Pixar)
- 2015 The Good Dinosaur, marketing (Pixar)
- 2016 Finding Dory, theme parks (Pixar)
- 2017 Cars 3, theme parks (Pixar)
- 2017 Coco, theme parks (Pixar)
- 2018 Incredibles 2, theme parks (Pixar)
- 2019 Toy Story 4, theme parks (Pixar)
- 2020 Onward, theme parks (Pixar)
- 2020 Soul, theme parks (Pixar)
- 2021 Luca, theme parks (Pixar)
- 2022 Turning Red, parks & promo (Pixar)
- 2022 Lightyear, parks & promo (Pixar)
- 2023 Elemental, theme parks (Pixar)

== Games ==
- 2008 Tasha's Game, artist, animator (Double Fine)
- 2009 Brütal Legend, lead animator (Double Fine)
- 2010 Costume Quest, project leader (Double Fine)
- 2011 Iron Brigade, additional animation (Double Fine)
- 2011 Sesame Street: Once Upon a Monster, additional art (Double Fine)
