= Lisette Titre-Montgomery =

American video game artist and designer

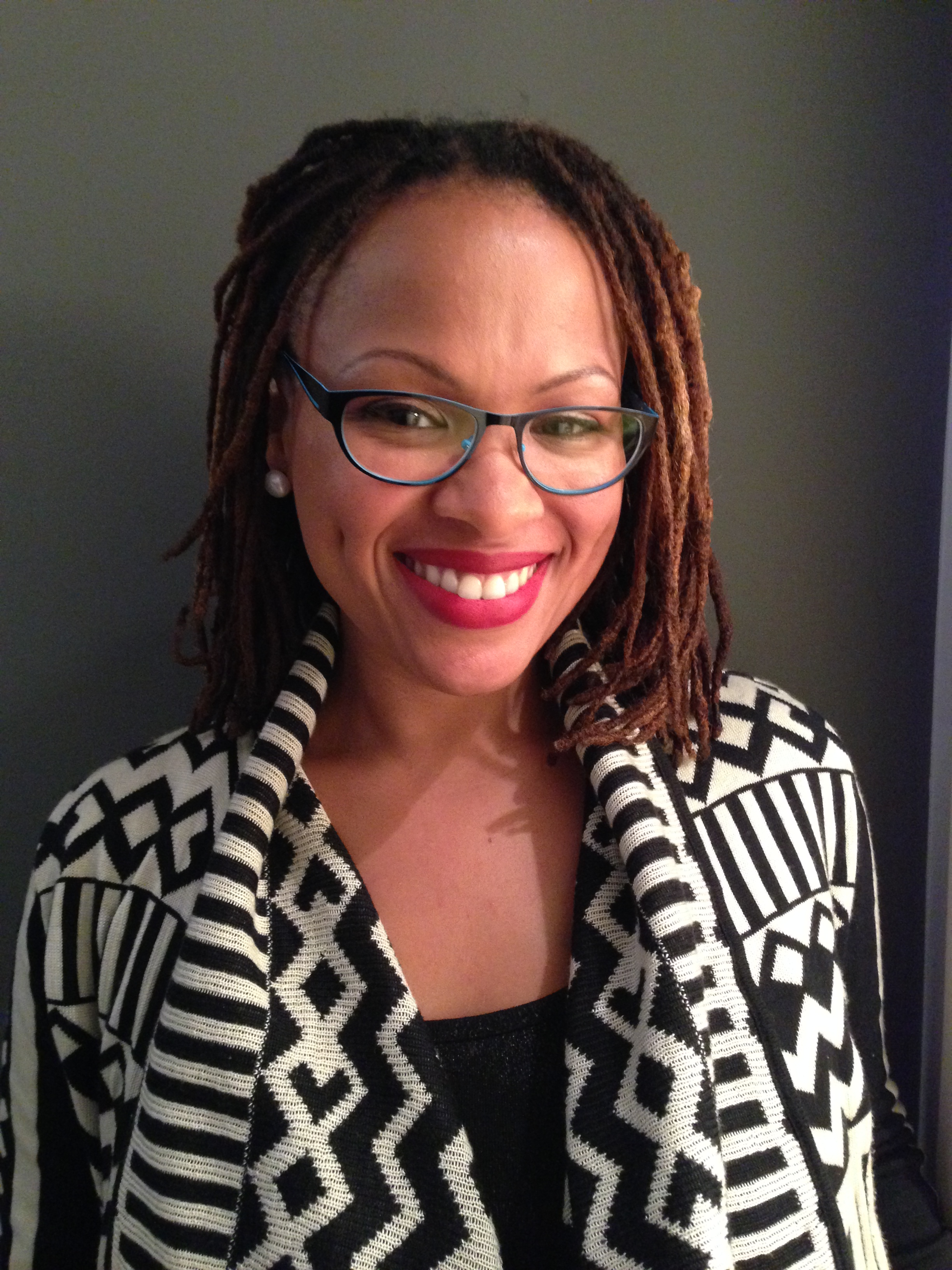
- Born: June 21, 1977 (age 48)
- Occupations: Art Director, CEO and Co-Founder of Cornerstone Studios
- Notable work: Art Director of Psychonauts 2
- Website: lisettetitre.com

Lisette Titre-Montgomery (born 1977) is an American video game artist and designer. She has worked at Backbone Entertainment, EA Games, Ubisoft, Double Fine Productions, and more. She is current Co-Founder of Cornerstone Interactive Studios.

== Biography ==
Lisette has been both a gamer and an artist from a young age. After seeing Toy Story, she was inspired to study computer animation. Titre-Montgomery graduated with a BFA in computer animation from Miami International University of Art and Design in 2000.

== Career ==
Titre's first animation job was working at Page 44 Studios in 2001 as a character modeler for the game, Freekstyle. Working on Freekstyle helped her land a job as a senior character and special effects artist at EA Games around 2005. She worked on Tiger Woods PGA Tour 2006 & 2007 as her first games at EA. Other games she helped develop were The Simpsons Game, The Godfather II and Dante's Inferno. In 2011, she left EA Games and went on to become the Lead artist at Backbone Entertainment. At Backbone, she worked on Zombie Apocalypse: Never Die Alone, Midway Arcade Origins, Dance Central 3. Titre-Montgomery returned to EA Games in 2013, where she worked on The Sims 4. She was featured on the cover of Black Enterprise in 2011.

Around 2015, Titre-Montgomery started working as the Art Lead of the South Park Fractured But Whole team at Ubisoft. In 2017, Titre-Montgomery became Art Director at Double Fine Productions, where she led the Psychonauts 2 art team to create an award winning game.

She is co-founder of Cornerstone Interactive, a AAA/III narrative driven game development studio. Since taking the company public, she has spoken on the difficulties obtaining venture-capital funding.

During Titre's career, she was able to work with the nonprofit, Blacks in Gaming, in the outreach program. She was part of a speaking group that would go and talk to high school and middle school students about tech. She also spoke about what it means to be a minority in the gaming industry, and observed the lack of women there. By working with Gameheads, she has supported women and youth aged 14–25 in creating their first games, encouraging them to develop characters and stories by and for women. She also empowers women to share their ideas and amplify their voices in the gaming space. Titre-Montgomery feels that learning with games is a way to get kids interested in STEM careers.
