= Broken Age =

2015 video game

- Cover art featuring Vella (left) and Shay (right) in their respective homes
- Developer: Double Fine Productions
- Publisher: Double Fine Productions
- Director: Tim Schafer
- Producer: Greg Rice
- Programmers: Oliver Franzke; Anna Kipnis
- Artists: Lee Petty; Nathan Stapley
- Writer: Tim Schafer
- Composer: Peter McConnell
- Engine: Moai
- Platforms: Microsoft Windows, macOS, Linux, Ouya, iOS, Android, PlayStation 4, PlayStation Vita, Xbox One, Nintendo Switch
- Release: Act 1: Microsoft Windows, macOS, Linux; WW: January 14, 2014 (Backer Beta); WW: January 28, 2014 (Public) Ouya; WW: May 30, 2014 iOS; WW: June 12, 2014; Act 2: Microsoft Windows, macOS, Linux, Android, Ouya, iOS; NA: April 28, 2015; EU: April 29, 2015; Complete Pack: Microsoft Windows, macOS, Linux, Android, PlayStation 4, PlayStation Vita; NA: April 28, 2015; EU: April 29, 2015 Xbox One; WW: June 23, 2017 Nintendo Switch; WW: September 13, 2018
- Genre: Point-and-click adventure
- Mode: Single-player

Broken Age is a point-and-click adventure video game developed and published by Double Fine. Broken Age was game director Tim Schafer's first return to the genre since 1998's Grim Fandango, and was released for Microsoft Windows, macOS, Linux, iOS, Android, PlayStation 4, PlayStation Vita, and Xbox One platforms. The game was developed in two acts; the first was released on January 28, 2014 (two weeks earlier for Kickstarter backers), and the second was released on April 28, 2015. A retail version of the complete game for Windows, macOS, and Linux, published by Nordic Games, was released on April 28, 2015. A Nintendo Switch version was released on September 13, 2018.

Broken Age began under the working title Double Fine Adventure as a Kickstarter crowdfunded project promoted by Double Fine and 2 Player Productions in February 2012. Though originally a goal of $400,000 was set to cover the costs of development and documentary filming, Broken Age became the largest crowdfunded video game project at the time, raising over $3.45 million from more than 87,000 backers within the month. It remains one of the highest-backed crowdfunded projects of any type, and its success helped to establish crowdfunding as a viable alternative to traditional venture capital and publisher funding for niche video game titles. The game's development was chronicled by an episodic series of documentaries produced by 2 Player Productions.

== Gameplay ==
Game screen and interface

Broken Age is a point-and-click adventure game, where the player-controlled character can be directed to move about the screen, examine objects, and talk to non-player characters to learn more about the game world. The game features two playable characters, each located in seemingly separate worlds; the player can switch from one character to the other via the game's interface at any time, but otherwise these characters do not interact in any direct way. The game employs context-sensitive actions instead of using verb lists as early adventure games would use, as Schafer stated that in essence, "there really was always one verb, which was 'interact with'" and opted for the more modern approach. Each character has separate item inventories as they collect objects; items can be used by dragging them onto context-sensitive areas on the screen or combined with other inventory items.

== Plot ==
=== Act 1 ===
Broken Age tells the story of two teenagers with no immediate apparent connection, each "seeking to break the tradition in their lives".

Vella Tartine (voiced by Masasa Moyo) is a young woman living in the Badlands, a land ravaged by the Mogs, giant creatures that come from beyond a wall called the Plague Dam. Appearing every fourteen years, they are appeased by the sacrifice of young girls at a number of Maiden's Feasts held at various villages. Vella is chosen to be sacrificed to Mog Chothra at the feast in her hometown of Sugar Bunting (formerly a town made up of warriors named Steel Bunting) but concludes that if the monster could be killed, the rituals could be ended. She finds a way to escape the beast and ends up in Meriloft, a small colony which rests on a cluster of semisolid clouds. They are dealing with the aftermath of their own Feast, affirming her belief the rites are disastrous to their people and should be ended. She finds her way to a nearby port town, Shellmound, where they are preparing for their own Feast. There she discovers the Dead Eye God's temple, which turns out to be an ancient spaceship, the Maloruna, half-buried by the sand. She is able to wake its pilot, Alex, from his three hundred year stasis, and he helps her to rig the ship's scanning system to fire a laser at Mog Chothra when he shows up for the Feast. Vella's plan works, and she is able to bring down the creature.

Shay Volta (voiced by Elijah Wood) is a young man and seemingly the only passenger on the spaceship Bossa Nostra (Bassinostra), an "incubator vessel". The ship's computer has two artificial intelligences (AIs). The computer's diurnal AI, named "MOM", acts as a mother figure to Shay, occupying him with infantile "missions" and boring routines, while preventing him from learning about or exploring anything farther than the outside of the ship. The computer's nocturnal AI named "DAD" acts as a father figure to Shay and is more understanding of Shay's desire for independence, but appears to be too busy to spend time with Shay. "MOM" tells Shay that he is part of Operation Dandelion, a last-ditch effort by his home planet, Loruna, to protect him following the planet's destruction and to try to find a home for him. After a brief encounter with an unknown stowaway, Shay sneaks into the bowels of the ship, finding the stowaway to be a wolf costume-wearing being named Marek. Marek claims that, unbeknownst to him, a war is raging in the galaxy, and he needs Shay's help to save some innocent creatures who have been imprisoned in different areas of the galaxy as a result. Marek guides Shay through various missions against "MOM"'s knowledge and control, trying to rescue a number of the creatures at each location, before they are discovered by an enemy force. During one of these rescues, Shay refuses to leave the last creature behind, causing the ship to be attacked, and trapping Marek underneath a pile of debris. In the ensuing chaos, Shay is knocked unconscious.

Act 1 ends when Vella, going up to the downed Mog Chothra, discovers the monster is mechanical. Shay emerges confused from inside, revealing that in fact he was not in outer space, and he was unwittingly controlling Mog Chothra. In confusion, Vella attempts to punch Shay but misses and falls into Mog Chothra's mouth. The mouth closes behind her, leaving them both trapped in each other's worlds, uncertain of what to do in their new surroundings.

=== Act 2 ===
Shay, trapped outside Mog Chothra, realizes/is reminded that the ship's "AIs" are actually his real parents; his father, Ray Volta ("DAD"), stuck outside with Shay, warns that his mother is still trapped within. As Ray tries to find a way back inside, Shay, recovered from his shock of the outside world, starts taking a look around when the ship takes off, stranding them there. Shay meets Alex, learning that he was a previous subject of Operation Dandelion. Alex was born on his ship, the Maloruna, a Diamond Age Dandelion Cruiser. His parents never showed him any pictures of Loruna. They lived for about 20 years after the crash (280 years ago), and died three months apart from each other; their passing was one of the reasons why he went into crysolation. Before his ship's crash, Alex had a talking cello named Marek who told him to hack the controls and rescue innocent creatures, just like Shay, who realizes that they were really capturing girls.

Shay offers to help repair Alex's ship to return to Loruna, where Alex believes Shay's ship is heading. Meanwhile, Vella (having accidentally reactivated the computer's autopilot) works her way into the ship and encounters Marek, who is still pinned under debris. Marek directs Vella to get into the control room as to stop Shay's mother, Hope Volta ("MOM"). Vella pretends that she is Shay to trick his mother into opening the door, but they are both quickly locked inside by Marek, who reveals himself to be Marekai, a member of a race called the Thrush. Marekai told Hope their world was dying so she went forth and found salvation, like many before her: their ships were the Mogs. It turns out Loruna is not a planet but an empire beyond the Plague Dam, as he directs the ship to deliver Vella there. Meanwhile, Shay makes his way through Shellmound and Meriloft to find parts to repair Alex's ship and go back to Loruna. He retraces Vella's journey and talks to the people with whom she interacted in Act 1 and her family, as they search for her.

Back on Vella's side, Vella frees herself and Hope, and the true nature of Operation Dandelion is revealed: the Thrush, believing the rest of the beings on the planet to be filled with disease, barricaded themselves with the humans whom they govern beyond the Plague Dam, and over the generations, modified their own normal human DNA to become "superior", but also lost certain traits necessary for survival. Operation Dandelion has been used to send out uniquely attuned human children from their normal human population who could locate a special maiden via the Maiden's Feasts to "true" their bloodline. All the other Maidens Shay captured are alive but held captive, but his inability to bring himself to leave Vella behind makes her the one he has chosen for the Thrush for them to kill so as to incorporate her genetics into theirs.

Knowing her potential fate, Vella creates a bomb from some components of the ship's power core to destroy the hangar where all the Mog ships are kept. After planting the bomb, Hope and Vella set their ship to escape. Meanwhile, with the repairs complete, Shay helps Alex reactivate his ship and they set a course directly for the Plague Dam, accompanied by Shay's father and Vella's family. Right outside the gate, the two ships collide and the Thrush starts attacking the ships, which are both stuck on autopilot. Shay and Vella work together to cause Alex's ship reactor to overheat, melting both ships together. Everyone but Shay escapes, and Vella and Hope encourage him to jump to safety; Shay jumps, just missing a ledge, but is saved by the noble sacrifice of one of his robots, Grabbin' Gary. The fused ships soon solidify, forming a bridge between the mainland and the Plague Dam. Shay and Vella finally meet. After a moment's hesitation, they smile at one another.

Within the credit sequence, it is shown that the Thrush is deposed from power, the Plague Dam is demolished, and the humans of Loruna and the Badlands form a peaceful alliance. Many images in the credits include the notable people, animals, and machines shown throughout the game living much better lives, including Vella and Shay, who became closer to each other.

== Development ==
=== Announcement and fundraising ===
Promotional art used to promote the project on Kickstarter, with the Double Fine two-headed baby logo, used as part of the rewards for Kickstarter backers

Double Fine Adventure was announced by way of a Kickstarter project initiated on February 8, 2012. The idea came after Double Fine's Tim Schafer was interviewed for 2 Player Productions' upcoming Kickstarter-funded documentary on the game Minecraft. After the interview, Schafer and 2 Player discussed the idea of the production company filming a documentary about Double Fine as a future project. Double Fine had already had experience as a studio being filmed during development of Psychonauts for an episode of G4 TV's Icons series. When 2 Player completed the Minecraft project, around November 2011, they wanted to create a more in-depth documentary, recognizing that Double Fine had the right type of environment where such a documentary would be possible. The two studios began to work out the specifics of the project, but Schafer realized that publisher interference would make an honest portrayal of game development impossible. Double Fine lacked the resources to self-fund a game, and 2 Player lacked the ability to fund the film, so the two companies elected to crowd-fund the project on Kickstarter, a method Schafer had seen successfully used to raise much smaller amounts for independent game developers. The creation of a new game was initially considered "kind of as a sidenote" by Schafer to accommodate the documentary filming.

The adventure game genre was selected to offer the public a product that would not have existed without their support, and help to distinguish the project from the developer's publisher-financed work. Schafer, a veteran of LucasArts, has long been associated with adventure games, a genre that has long been stigmatized as commercially niche, particularly since the release of Schafer's own Grim Fandango. In his pitch to the public, Schafer argued that funding for such a project would be very difficult to come by, stating "If I were to go to a publisher right now and pitch an adventure game, they'd laugh in my face." Ron Gilbert, another ex-LucasArts adventure game designer at Double Fine, has long expressed this sentiment, writing in his personal blog, "From first-hand experience, I can tell you that if you even utter the words "adventure game" in a meeting with a publisher you can just pack up your spiffy concept art and leave. You'd get a better reaction by announcing that you have the plague." Schafer explained that the game will not be "museum" or "nostalgia" work, but instead "It's going to be fresh and feel modern and feel like what the next game would have been if I'd made one straight after Grim Fandango".

The Kickstarter drive was launched in early February 2012 so that, regardless of its success, Schafer would be able to talk about it during the 2012 Game Developers' Conference in early March. Double Fine set the goal for the project at $400,000, with $100,000 allocated to the film production and $300,000 for the game. Although this was the largest goal of any gaming project yet on Kickstarter, it was the lowest budget the company had worked with, and a small fraction of the budget of the company's previous downloadable games, which cost around $2 million. Schafer admitted that a game made for this budget would be "hobbled" and that the budget was chosen because it was the absolute minimum he thought he could make an adventure game for. The two had originally envisioned a total $200,000 budget, a typical cost for an iOS game, but Schafer had doubts about whether Double Fine could deliver a game for such a low cost.

Various incentives were given to those that pledged $15 or more, including the game itself, early beta access to the game, access to private community areas to discuss the game, prints, and invitations to meet with the Double Fine staff. Further rewards were added through a second update two weeks into the effort, including digital soundtracks, physical copies of the game and documentary, and an art book. In launching the Kickstarter project, Double Fine claimed it was the first major studio to use the model for the funding of a game.

Within nine hours, the Kickstarter project had exceeded the $400,000 goal. Within 24 hours, it had surpassed $1 million. As the funds raised approached $1.35 million, Schafer noted that the total had already exceeded the budget for Day of the Tentacle ($600,000) and was nearing the budget for Full Throttle ($1.5 million). Kickstarter stated on the day after its start that the Double Fine effort is the most successful to date, having attracted more backers than any prior effort in the site's history while others have noted it is the second project – the Elevation Dock project being the first – to achieve more than $1 million in funding through Kickstarter. The Double Fine project passed the $2 million mark on February 20, 2012, twelve days after fund raising began. The Kickstarter closed on March 13 with more than $3.3 million from over 87,000 backers, and with another $110,000 promised by premium backers such as Days of Wonder and Alex Rigopulos. Schafer stated that the total funding was nearly the same as the budget for their previous downloadable titles, Costume Quest and Stacking, as well as his earlier LucasArts game, Grim Fandango.

The Kickstarter page was updated with the promise that additional funds would go to increased production values for the game and film, and deployment on additional platforms. A later update by Schafer affirmed that the additional funding will support development for the macOS and Linux platforms and select iOS and Android devices. Additionally, the game will have voice acting for the English version, and include text localization for French, German, Italian, and Spanish languages. Schafer also stated that a digital rights management-free version of the game will be available after release. With the added funding for better production values, Schafer estimated it would likely take about a year to complete the game, missing their original anticipated October 2012 release. A release in the second quarter of 2013 has been estimated by Double Fine, later delayed to September 2013. At the 2013 D.I.C.E. Summit, Double Fine and Ouya announced a partnership, assuring that the Ouya console would be the only gaming console on which Double Fine Adventure would be released at its launch, in addition to versions for the personal computers.

After the Kickstarter, Double Fine launched a "slacker backer" program, which would allow players to pre-order the game through their site at a fixed cost, giving them access to the documentary and beta versions of the game once they were released. The slacker backer option was also offered as part of the Double Fine Humble Bundle in May 2013 for those that purchased the bundle at a fixed price tier.

=== Game development ===
Broken Age began development under the codename "Reds", after Red's Place, following a Double Fine tradition of basing codenames on local Chinatown bars. As Schafer had not written anything by the time development started, early efforts focused on creating a game engine, art style, and answering technical questions. The open-source Moai game platform was chosen as the foundation for the game's engine. Nathan Martz, the technical director for Double Fine, stated that the open source nature of Moai allowed them to easily alter any aspect of the code base, while also supporting all of the targeted platforms.

Programmers created a test game involving a red robot, while the artists created a mock-up test scenario to establish an art and animation style inspired by the fine art illustrations of lead artist Nathan Stapley, as well as to work out answers to basic interface questions. A sequence involving an unnamed lumberjack character and a cabin in the woods was created and the team decided to use a system of skeletal animation using segmented 2D characters. Once Schafer had established the basic storyline, involving the intersecting stories of a boy in a sci-fi world and a girl in a fantasy world, concept artists were gathered for an "art jam" to brainstorm and produce concept art for the game's creatures and locations. Schafer also asked the community for ideas, several of which were then illustrated by the concept artists.

Schafer re-evaluated the state of the project in July 2013 and recognized that at their current rate, they would not be able to complete the game until 2015. For the first time in the company's history Double Fine decided to enlist the help of an outside studio, hiring SuperGenius to assist with art and animation. Double Fine also realized that they would run out of the Kickstarter funds before 2015, either requiring them to drastically cut back on the project or alter their release plans. Schafer opted to adjust the schedule and split the game into two acts, allowing them to fund the second act with money made from sales of the first. They had noticed that breaking the game into halves would fit naturally with events already occurring at the midpoint of the story, making the split relatively simple from a production perspective.

The first playable version of the game was released on Steam's Early Access platform in January 2014, allowing Double Fine to obtain revenue from sales to fund the remaining development while gaining additional testing input before releasing a final version of the first act. Initial backlash to this announcement led Schafer to clarify that they were not asking for more money to develop the title, and that "we are using our own money to deliver a bigger game than we Kickstarted". In the end, the first act was deemed complete and polished enough to graduate from Early Access on January 28, with the second half to be released as a free update later in the year. By February 2014, Schafer confirmed that they had obtained enough from sales of Act 1 to complete the development and release of Act 2.

In October 2014, producer Greg Rice announced that Schafer had finished writing the second act and the game's finale. Though the second act was anticipated to be released in 2014, Schafer announced in November 2014 that they needed additional time to ensure the quality of Act 2 met expectations and pushed the release back to early 2015. Double Fine was able to use feedback from the first act's release to improve and alter some aspects of the second. One complaint of the first act was the simple nature of its puzzles, whose difficulty Double Fine increased for Act 2. The team also included a nod to a fan theory that had grown regarding the relation between Shay and Alex as a running joke in the second act. The game's finale was planned out from the start, before the game was split into Acts; Schafer said he had taken influence of the end credits of My Neighbor Totoro, which provides epilogue in the form of simple drawings alongside the running credits, to tell the fate of all the characters. He preferred this so that the narrative end of the game before the credits could be focused solely on Vella and Shay, instead of having each character appear to speak a line or so as to explain their fate.

A retail version of the game, containing both acts, for Windows, macOS, and Linux platforms was published through partnership with Nordic Games, who had helped to bring retail releases of Double Fine's earlier games in 2014. The retail version was released near the release of Act 2 for other platforms. Limited Run Games will publish retail editions for the PlayStation 4 and PlayStation Vita in June 2017.

Several voice actors who worked on previous Double Fine games voiced characters within Broken Age, including Jennifer Hale, Richard Horvitz, Nick Jameson, Nicki Rapp, Ginny Westcott, and Jack Black. Other voice actors include Elijah Wood, Pendleton Ward, Wil Wheaton, and Masasa Moyo. Alex Rigopulos, the largest backer of the Kickstarter campaign, voiced a character that was designed in his likeness; Schafer decided to make the character effectively the same person Rigopulos was in both manner and appearance to minimize the amount of voice acting Rigopulos would need to do. Days of Wonder was the second-largest backer, and through them, Double Fine included the character of the conductor from Days of Wonder's Ticket to Ride games as part of one of Shay's mission rooms.

Peter McConnell, who had worked with Schafer on many of his previous games, composed the music for Broken Age. Initially McConnell planned to use only a small ensemble for the musical score but, as the game development progressed, he realized some parts needed a bigger orchestral sound. The score was ultimately recorded by wind and string ensembles in San Francisco and the Melbourne Symphony Orchestra, with McConnell overseeing the latter recording session with mixer Jory Prum remotely from Fairfax, California. The score for the first act was released as a soundtrack album on the same day the first half of the game became publicly available. The soundtrack was released on vinyl in September 2016.

During the Electronic Entertainment Expo 2018, Schafer announced that Broken Age will be available on the Switch later that year, alongside the remastered version of Grim Fandango.

=== Documentary ===
The development process of Broken Age was recorded by 2 Player Productions as part of the Kickstarter project. In 2011, Paul Owens of 2 Player Productions wrote an e-mail to Greg Rice and Tim Schafer of Double Fine Productions with a proposition of making a documentary series charting the development of a game from beginning to end. A part of the Kickstarter money was set aside for the documentary. The documentary was originally only available to backers, but as of March 2015, the company has started providing the episodes free of charge to YouTube. The 12.5 hour documentary has received praise for being an honest, open look into the game's development process.

== Reception ==
Reception

Aggregate scores
Aggregator	Score
Metacritic	PC: 76/100 (Act 1) PC: 82/100 (Act 1) iOS: 76/100 (Act 2) PC: 73/100; PS4: 81/100; VITA: 90/100; XONE: 78/100
OpenCritic	79/100; 69% Critics Recommend

Review scores
Publication	Score
Destructoid	9.5/10
Eurogamer	7/10
Game Informer	8.5/10
GameSpot	7/10
IGN	9.5/10
Polygon	8/10
TouchArcade	3.5/5

The game's first act was well received by critics, scoring 82/100 on review aggregation website Metacritic. Adam Sessler of Rev3Games gave Broken Age Act 1 a 4/5 calling it a beautiful game with wonderful and funny writing. Justin McElroy, writing at Polygon highlighted the game's characters as "grounded while approaching absurdity and adversity with brave, heartfelt sincerity" giving the game a "kind of depth that's so often lacking in other 'funny' games". Within a month of the first act's release, Schafer confirmed that its sales would be sufficient to cover the remaining development costs for Act 2.

Act 2, released more than a year later, received a similar response overall, with a Metacritic score of 73/100. Despite this, many critics saw the second act as a letdown following the success of the first: John Walker of Rock Paper Shotgun praised the art and voice acting, but criticised Act 2 for its re-use of locations from Act 1 and lackluster ending, following up his review with a lengthy article expanding on his criticism of the story. Other critics had similar complaints, including Justin McElroy, who in an update to his initial Act 1 review, was disappointed by too much puzzling in the second half. He also echoed a common criticism of the frustrating difficulty of the puzzles, which many reviewers felt were much harder than in Act 1, especially if players tried to pick it up without replaying the first half.

=== Impact ===
The success of the fundraising campaign established crowdsourcing as a challenge to publisher funding (and control) for multimillion-dollar projects. John Walker from Rock, Paper, Shotgun was quick to point out that this does not pose a major threat to publishers on a large scale, but added that it would force publishers to ask themselves questions such as "Are we really in touch with our audience’s desires?". Johnny Cullen of VG247 compared the Double Fine Kickstarter to the release of Radiohead's album In Rainbows, which the band had sold through their website in a pay-what-you-want model prior to a physical printing, without the interference of a music publisher. Cullen noted the model of crowdsourcing has previously not worked for some game developers, and does not expect it to be a guaranteed success for future efforts, as he believes Double Fine is a unique studio with a dedicated fan base, aspects that are not shared by all developers.

Initial commentary largely framed Double Fine as exceptional, citing Double Fine's reputation, experience with the under-serviced genre, and history of difficulty with publisher funding as reasons why Double Fine's case was unique. Initially, many remained skeptical that such a level of success could be replicated. Schafer further agreed that the success of the Double Fine Kickstarter would be somewhat difficult to replicate for other games, even for Double Fine, as it would require the project to be "a good story for people to get behind".

Initial fears that this success would be isolated were allayed as new projects emerged. As the Double Fine Adventure campaign closed, Brian Fargo of inXile Entertainment launched a Kickstarter to fund development of the sequel Wasteland 2, which met its target of $900,000 in funding within two days, and eventually raised more than $2.9 million. Double Fine Adventure brought in 61,692 new users to Kickstarter, and greatly increased the platform's visibility and viability for funding of games projects. Within the six weeks following the launch of the Double Fine Adventure Kickstarter, the site raised more than $2.9 million in pledges (outside of the Double Fine project) for video game related projects, compared with $1.7 million total for the category in the prior two years, as well as increasing the amount of funding coming into projects of all categories. In October, Project Eternity surpassed Double Fine's funding record, further suggesting the crowdfunding model will continue to be a part of the gaming landscape.

The success of Double Fine Adventure has had a particularly visible impact on the adventure genre, inspiring several other established adventure game developers to use Kickstarter as a means to return to the genre. In the months following its release, the creators of Broken Sword, Gabriel Knight, Leisure Suit Larry, Space Quest and Tex Murphy have all managed to raise amounts in excess of Schafer's original goal of $400,000.
