= Psychonauts in the Rhombus of Ruin =

2017 virtual reality adventure game

- Developer: Double Fine Productions
- Publisher: Double Fine Productions
- Directors: Chad Dawson; Raymond Crook
- Producer: Andy Alamano
- Programmer: Chad Dawson
- Writer: Tim Schafer
- Composer: Peter McConnell
- Series: Psychonauts
- Engine: Unreal Engine 4
- Platforms: PlayStation VR; Microsoft Windows
- Release: PlayStation 4; February 21, 2017; Microsoft Windows; April 19, 2018
- Genre: Adventure
- Mode: Single-player

Psychonauts in the Rhombus of Ruin is a virtual reality adventure game developed and published by Double Fine Productions. It was released for the PlayStation 4 through PlayStation VR in February 2017 and on Microsoft Windows in April 2018. The game's story bridges the events between Psychonauts and Psychonauts 2.

== Gameplay ==
Unlike the original Psychonauts, Psychonauts in the Rhombus of Ruin is not a 3D platformer, but instead a first-person puzzle-focused game similar to a point-and-click adventure. As Raz, the player always remains in a seated position, and may interact with characters and objects in the world using his psychic powers such as telekinesis and pyrokinesis. While many VR games have utilized a "blink teleportation" mechanic to allow players to travel in the virtual world, Psychonauts in the Rhombus of Ruin instead requires the player to use Raz's clairvoyance ability to see the world from the perspectives of the other characters in the scene (who also remain seated throughout). These mechanics are used to solve puzzles to gain information and trigger events which further the plot and advance the game.

== Plot ==
The story picks up immediately after the ending of Psychonauts, with new Psychonaut cadet Razputin "Raz" Aquato joining fellow cadet Lili Zanotto and agents Sasha Nein, Milla Vodello, and Morceau Oleander in rescuing Lili's captured father Truman, the Grand Head of the Psychonauts. Using his Clairvoyance ability, Raz discovers Truman is being held at an abandoned Psychonaut research facility in an oceanic region known as the Rhombus of Ruin (a play on the Bermuda Triangle), built to study a large underwater deposit of Psilirium (a fictional element variant of Psitanium that can distort psychic powers and creates illusions). The team travels into the Rhombus of Ruin, but the jet crashes before they can act.

Raz awakens tied to a chair in the chamber Truman is being kept. Using his psychic abilities to explore the junk-filled ocean, Raz finds Sasha, Milla, Lili and Morceau trapped in Psilirium-induced hallucinations. After freeing his team from their hallucinations, Raz is pulled back into the chamber by Truman's captor, the insane ex-dentist Dr. Loboto, who kidnapped Truman on the orders of a new client. By using a Psycho-Portal given to him by Morceau, Raz enters Loboto's mind. There, he fights a gigantic version of Loboto and enters his memories, where Raz learns Loboto was once a psychic himself, and his parents disapproved of his abilities and had him lobotomized. The process removed his psychic powers and drove Loboto insane, leading to his commitment at the Thorney Towers asylum.

After Raz exits Loboto's mind, Loboto seems to have a change of heart by releasing his team, but instead leaves Raz and the others and floods the base, which they barely escape from with Truman in tow. The game ends with the team flying back to their Motherlobe headquarters as Lili tells her father about their adventures, shocking him with the revelation that Raz is her boyfriend. Unbeknownst to the others, Loboto secretly hides himself in the jet's luggage compartment.

== Development ==
The concept for Psychonauts in the Rhombus of Ruin came about during the lead-up to the crowd-sourcing campaign for Psychonauts 2. According to Double Fine's CEO, Tim Schafer, they were looking to see what types of games they could develop with a virtual reality (VR) system, comparing it to the games they had made for the Kinect system earlier. Due to their recent focus on Psychonauts, the team agreed that a VR-based Psychonauts game would be a good fit, allowing the player to become immersed in the odd environments within the Psychonauts universe.

It was announced on December 5, 2015 during PlayStation Experience. Sony funded the game's development.

The game was released on February 21, 2017 for PlayStation VR, after approximately a year and a half of development. The game was released on Microsoft Windows on April 19, 2018 for HTC Vive and Oculus Rift.

== Reception ==
Reception

Aggregate score
Aggregator	Score
Metacritic	71/100

Review scores
Publication	Score
Destructoid	8.5/10
Game Informer	6.5/10
GameSpot	6/10
IGN	7.5/10
PlayStation Official Magazine – UK	7/10
Road to VR	7.2/10
UploadVR	5/10

Psychonauts in the Rhombus of Ruin received average reviews from critics. Reviewers praised the unique gameplay mechanics and their integration into the story, as well as the continued expansion of the Psychonauts universe. Criticism was directed at the game's short length, limited replay value, and abrupt ending.

The game was nominated for "Best VR Experience" in IGN's Best of 2017 Awards, and for "Immersive Reality Game of the Year" at the 21st Annual D.I.C.E. Awards.
