= Double Fine Happy Action Theater =

2012 video game

- Developer: Double Fine Productions
- Publisher: Microsoft Studios
- Director: Tim Schafer
- Composer: Jared Emerson-Johnson
- Platform: Xbox 360 (XBLA)
- Release: February 1, 2012
- Genre: Casual
- Modes: Single-player, multiplayer

Double Fine Happy Action Theater (sometimes referred to as Happy Action Theater) is a casual video game developed by Double Fine Productions and distributed by Microsoft Game Studios. The title is a Kinect motion-sensing based title for the Xbox 360 and was released via the Xbox Live Arcade service on February 1, 2012. Happy Action Theater is based on an idea that Double Fine's founder, Tim Schafer, had on devising a game that Lily, his two-year-old daughter (at the time), could play with. To this, the open-ended game is a collection of eighteen different modes that allow multiple players to interact in unique ways through the Kinect cameras and motion-sensing in an augmented reality shown on the console's display, such as playing in a giant virtual ball pit or walking through simulated lava.

== Gameplay ==
Happy Action Theater is an open-ended game, providing eighteen different modes that incorporate features of the Kinect motion-sensing and camera system. Players can select any one of the eighteen modes, or opt to have the game randomly select modes and cycle through them every few minutes. The game can support the tracking of up to 6 players.

Within most modes there are no goals, only to perform certain actions for the Kinect as to create humorous results in a form of augmented reality on the console's display. For example, one mode simulates a flow of lava that fills the player's room on the game's screen, and depicts the player within it. From here, the player can kick at rocks that float on the lava, interact with small animated flame sparks that jump around, or by "immersing" themselves in the lava, can have their hands temporarily shoot fireballs to "wipe out" other players on screen for a short period of time. Another mode simulates Space Invaders, with the players required to hold their hands up and move about as to destroy attacking forces on screen; while a score is kept, the mode is endless. The game does include a limited number of achievements for certain actions.

== Development ==
Happy Action Theater was originally announced in October 2011 as Double Fine's next project after their Kinect-based Sesame Street: Once Upon a Monster project. Schafer had found that in playing Kinect games with Lili, his 2-year-old daughter at the time, that her patience and behavior would often cause havoc with the Kinect system, caused by both limitations of the Kinect systems and the hard rules of the specific game. Schafer envisioned the concept of Happy Action Theater as to create the simplest playing experience possible such that his daughter could play it without help. Schafer's idea for the approach to Happy Action Theater was partially inspired by interactive advertisements at malls which would react to people passing in from them. In following this, Happy Action Theater was developed more like a toy or playmate rather than a game, having it react to whatever the players in front of the sensor was doing without adding any conformity. To create the game's concept, Double Fine had to strip out many normal aspects of a video game and avoided added extraneous features, as to make the game "more like interactive experiences", according to Drew Skillman, the technical artist for Double Fine. Schafer wanted to avoid over-thinking any aspect of the project: the team did add the idea of Xbox Achievements, but Schafer avoided adding any more features as he felt that the more open game is "very powerful when you put kids in front of it and see how much they’re able to make out of it". Skillman admits that they could have spent time developing any one of the activities into a more elaborate experience, but felt the simpler approach was appropriate for the game.

Double Fine's team used a rapid prototyping concept to try out new modes, spending a few days to program the activity and then testing it out to see if it could be expanded upon. Several additional modes were brainstormed in this manner, including modes designed to a specific number of players, but were not further developed. Further ideas were dropped when they encountered technical limitations of the Kinect hardware, such as placing fog in the augmented reality. Some ideas were actually implemented into a mode, but during playtesting, the team found that these were not as enjoyable as they originally had thought, while other ideas came from playing with various graphics effects and expanding it out to a full mode.

The "Lava" mode of Happy Action Theater. Double Fine's team found that children were more apt to "play" in the lava than to try to avoid it.

Double Fine performed internal playtesting, leaving the game running in a conference room to allow anyone passing to try it, and brought in friends and families with young children to try it out. Microsoft Game Studios also assisted with playtesting, providing Double Fine with live feeds of weekly testing sessions with children and their parents playing with the game. Testing with children was found to be important, as the children would identify new ways of playing with the modes that the team would later incorporate. In the lava mode, Schafer and his team originally envisioned that children would play "avoid the lava", standing and stepping between furniture to avoid stepping in it. Instead, when they tested the mode with children, the children played in the virtual lava, leading the team to add additional responses to these actions for the game. Some of the Achievements for the game resulted from watching these new interactions by children. The development team found that capturing the virtual physical interactions that would occur with the activity was more important than setting up predetermined behavior, as it would lead to more natural actions and enjoyment from players; for example, as long as they provided the appropriate physical nature of a ball pit, players "instinctively know the "right" thing to do. "Jump into it!" according to Skillman. Despite the aim for children, the Double Fine team found the game to appeal to "three-year-olds or college dorm rooms full of drunken 20-year-olds".

Happy Action Theater was developed by only six people at Double Fine, compared with their four "Amnesia Fortnight" projects which had around 12 members per team. Schafer stated the project was built on a much smaller budget than their other games, meant to be run at a small scale. They were able to secure some funding to develop the basic prototype, and from that, got additional funding and support from Microsoft Game Studios to complete the project. Unlike the other "Amnesia Fortnight" projects, where Schafer let other developers take the lead while he pursued a more creative consulting role, Happy Action Theater is Schafer's first game as creative lead since Brütal Legend. Double Fine built on their previous Kinect work from Once Upon a Monster to fully integrate the features of the hardware device into the game, and wanted to avoid any mode that could have simply been done with a camera such as the EyeToy. Because of their focus on the title as a toy rather than a game, they did not have to worry about technical accuracy, simplify the programming effort as well as avoiding some of the technical issues with the latency of the Kinect device. Schafer noted one example in the lava activity that it was more satisfying having the game respond to the player kicking at the lava than to have the splash height be accurate. They opted to use Kinect's six-player silhouette tracking instead of the more accurate two-player skeleton tracking feature as to allow more player to be involved; they used this information from the Kinect to create "blob" representations of the players that could be used to track motions for the various activities. They also utilized the depth and sound perception to create modes and effects around those elements, such as one mode that allows players to "interact" with previously snapped-photos of themselves spatially. The team also developed ways to analyze the background of the player's setting to allow them to alter the appearance of a player on screen, such as by erasing them or lifting them off-screen, filling in the missing space with the previously analyzed background. A further technical challenge was to create effective lighting of the players' images on the screen, such as when they are holding a simulated firework in their hand, and incorporating their shadows onto other virtual props as to provide better immersion in the game.

Double Fine announced that a sequel, titled Kinect Party, is expected to release within 2012, featuring more activities; owners of Happy Action Theater will be able to unlock those original activities within the sequel. The game includes new modes, such as one where players can don virtual costumes (including ones based on Minecraft), create and destroy castles, and perform as if they were in a dubstep video. The sequel also introduces the ability to take and share photos from the various game modes.

== Reception ==
Reception

Aggregate scores
Aggregator	Score
GameRankings	80.4%
Metacritic	81/100

Review scores
Publication	Score
Eurogamer	9/10
GameSpot	7.0/10
IGN	8.0/10
Official Xbox Magazine (US)	8.0/10

Double Fine Happy Action Theater was recognized by reviewers as a different experience that most game players, adults and older children, would expect, and recognized that the game was very well suited to younger children. Dan Whitehead of Eurogamer reviewed the game through the eyes of his daughter, and well appreciated the efforts Double Fine had gone to give children full control of the game and avoids setting preconceived notions of game expectations, giving children the ability to explore with their imaginations, "make games in their head from the things around them". Similarly, IGN's Casey Lynch reviewed the game with his two sons, who both enjoyed many of the activities offered and the chance to find "secret things" within each of the activities. Lynch noted that "The game aims to provide instant fun from the moment it's turned on, with as little barrier to entry as possible." Both reviewers and their children noted that not all the modes will be fun to all players, but with the Director mode cycling between stages every few minutes, no one activity gets too boring. Critics also noted that while the game is targeted to children, it would still work for older groups as a contrast to typical motion-sensing games, while the game would otherwise get monotonous and lack any reason to replay when engaged as a single player. Mathieu Marunczyn and Emily Ford at Jackson School in Victoria, Australia, who teach autistic children, found that Happy Action Theater was a benefit to the students, as it would engage them in sensory input and social interaction with their other students through the virtualization of the various activities in the game.
