= Gameheads =

Gameheads is an Oakland, California-based video game design education program for low-income youth and youth of color.

== History ==
Technology writer Damon Packwood co-founded Gameheads in 2014 to improve diversity in the video games industry and other STEAM fields. Packwood noticed that students in low-income neighborhoods had a lot of focus and interest for video games and DIY (do it yourself) culture, but that the emerging tech diversity movement had not yet extended to video games. While youth of color spend more time playing video games, they make up less than 20% of industry employees.

The Gameheads program was inspired in part by LittleBigPlanet, a game which gives players the ability to design their own levels. Packwood thought it would be interesting if students could use game design to share their experiences.

The organization is based in Oakland, California.

== Program ==
The game design program is for students aged 16–24, covering design, conception, coding, storytelling, writing, and motion capture. The program is a full year, with increased activity during the summer. Whereas the main program is primarily educational, another program, "DevOps", prepares young people for jobs in the San Francisco Bay Area. Industry professionals like designer Tim Schafer act as mentors, and several elements of the programs' design are intended to facilitate getting the students jobs in the games industry.

Students' games often focus on issues that affect them: migration, grief, stereotypes, mental health, motherhood, the Asian-American model minority myth, navigating social spaces, as well as more traditional video game themes. A game featured on NPR's Marketplace called Here's Your Change focuses on gentrification from the perspective of a cashier, communicating the way interactions with customers become more formal and transactional as the buildings get nicer. Throughout the game, the visual and audio design changes along with the neighborhood it is set in.
