= Epic Saga: Extreme Fighter =

2007 video game

- Logo of Epic Saga: Extreme Fighter
- Developer: Double Fine Productions
- Publisher: Double Fine Productions
- Designer: Klint Honeychurch
- Programmer: Klint Honeychurch
- Artist: Razmig Mavlian
- Writer: Razmig Mavlian
- Composer: Klint Honeychurch
- Platform: Browser
- Release: WW: September 6, 2007
- Genre: Fighting
- Mode: Single-player

Epic Saga: Extreme Fighter is a free Flash fighting game, designed by Klint Honeychurch with art by Razmig Mavlian. The game was published by Double Fine Productions, and was originally playable on their website.

== Gameplay ==
Like the webcomic it was based on, Epic Saga, the art style, music, and sound effects of the game are based on 8-bit video games. The control of the characters also directly follows 8-bit fighting games, which had only two action buttons and limited movement.

The humor in the game is like that in the comic as well. The game satirizes the winning phrases from fighting games with random conversations reminiscent of the comic, such as when one fighter asks "Would you like to get a cup of coffee?" and the other one responds with "I thought you'd never ask."

== Release and response ==
The game's press release satirized the rumors of the at-the-time unannounced game it had in production, Brütal Legend, stating that the game starred a "barbaric hero in an epic fantasy world, fighting his way from Rock and Roll Hell to Rock and Roll Heaven". Due to its association with Double Fine Productions, Epic Saga: Extreme Fighter received more attention than usual for a free online flash game. It was reported on by Kotaku, Joystiq, and 1UP.com. Michael McWhertor of Kotaku stated "If you've got the skills to take on this series of truly extreme fighters, you won't be disappointed. The ending is nothing short of spectacular".
