= Tasha's Game =

2008 video game

- Logo
- Developer: Double Fine Productions
- Publisher: Double Fine Productions
- Designer: Klint Honeychurch
- Programmer: Klint Honeychurch
- Artist: Tasha Harris
- Composers: Bert Chang; Razmig Mavlian
- Platform: Browser
- Release: WW: September 24, 2008
- Genre: Puzzle-platform
- Mode: Single-player

Tasha's Game is a free Adobe Flash puzzle-platform game by Klint Honeychurch, with art by Tasha Harris and music by Bert Chang and Razmig Mavlian. The game was published by Double Fine Productions, and was originally playable on their website.

== Gameplay ==
Both the plot and art of Tasha's Game directly follow Tasha's Comic, the webcomic by Tasha Harris which was hosted at Double Fine's website when she worked there, and is now continued on her personal blog. The gameplay combines platform game and puzzle game mechanics in a way similar to Lucidity, although the main character in Tasha's Game is directly controllable. The game's main character is Tasha herself (as in her comics), and her cat Snoopy acts as the game's cursor. The object of the game is to free various members of the Double Fine team, and of Tasha's family, by running and jumping across obstacles as well as using various power-ups collected along the way. The power-ups comprise the puzzle half of the gameplay, and are deployed at various locations where Tasha can jump on them to let her access parts of the level that can't be accessed otherwise.

== Reception ==
Tasha's Game was nominated for "Best of Casual Gameplay 2008" in the platform browser games category from Jay is Games. The International House of Mojo declared the game "easily better than Braid".
