= Costume Quest 2 =

2014 role-playing video game

- Developer: Double Fine Productions
- Publisher: Midnight City
- Director: Gabe Miller
- Producer: Daniel Pangelina
- Programmer: Ben Burbank
- Artist: Freddie Lee
- Writer: Gabe Miller
- Composer: Peter McConnell
- Series: Costume Quest
- Platforms: Linux, OS X, Windows, PS3, PS4, Wii U, Xbox 360, Xbox One
- Release: Linux, OS X, Windows; October 7, 2014; PS3, PS4, Wii U, Xbox 360, Xbox One; October 31, 2014
- Genre: Role-playing
- Mode: Single-player

Costume Quest 2 is a 2014 role-playing video game developed by Double Fine Productions and published by Midnight City. The sequel to Costume Quest (2010), Costume Quest 2 allows players to assume the identity of one of the two twin siblings, Wren or Reynold. Together with their friends, the group travels through the various in-game environments collecting candy and various costumes, in an attempt to thwart the plans of Dr. Orel White, who wishes to see Halloween banished forever. The game has an improved battle system and a time travel-based plotline. The downloadable-only title has been released on Linux, OS X, Windows, PlayStation 3, PlayStation 4, Wii U, Xbox 360, and Xbox One.

== Gameplay ==
Costume Quest 2 is a role-playing video game in which the player assumes the role of one of two twin siblings: Wren and Reynold. The game follows the player character, their sibling, and certain ally party members found along their travels as they journey through time in an effort to stop a dentist named Dr. Orel White from destroying Halloween. The player can access both the past and the future, where the past is before the foundation of the children's hometown, and the future takes place in a dental dystopia. As in Costume Quest, the gameplay mostly involves exploring the environment, completing quests, trick-or-treating, and fighting monsters in turn-based combat as gigantic versions of their costumed selves. The game introduces many new combat mechanics not found in the original Costume Quest, such as counters and double attacks.

== Plot ==
Costume Quest 2 picks up where the DLC expansion of Costume Quest, "Grubbins on Ice", left off; Everett, Lucy, Wren, and Reynold are trapped inside a nexus of portals with no clear way out. They decide to jump into one of the portals, which prompts the player to choose which of the two siblings, Wren and Reynold, they wish to play as. After jumping in the portal, the kids return to Halloween night. There, they find their dentist, Dr. Orel White, speaking with a time wizard, who opens a portal to the past that Orel jumps into. As the wizard disappears, Wren and Reynold are confronted by a man hiding in a bush who opens another portal which leads to a future where Halloween has been outlawed and Orel rules a dental dystopia.

The man, who reveals himself to be an older Everett, along with his wife Lucy, task the kids with travelling to the past to reclaim a talisman with the ability to open a gateway to the monster world before Orel himself can steal it. In the past, they encounter a younger Orel White who stalls their progress. With the help of a boy named Monty, they eventually locate the talisman, but are unable to prevent future Orel from stealing it. They return to the future having failed their mission, where they are captured and sent to a school, where they find Everett and Lucy's daughter Halley and must break out and confront Orel directly.

While in the future, the kids eventually encounter a retinal scanner which requires Orel to access. Travelling back to the past, the kids gain Orel as an ally, who, in the final battle against future Orel, denounces the actions of his future self and takes part in defeating him. Having changed the heart of younger Orel, the kids return to their present where Dr. White is now no longer evil.

== Reception ==
Reception

Aggregate score
Aggregator	Score
Metacritic	74/100 (PS4); 68/100 (PC); 68/100 (WU); 65/100 (XONE)

Review scores
Publication	Score
Destructoid	8/10
Eurogamer	5/10
Game Informer	6.75/10
GameSpot	7/10
GamesRadar+	3.5/5
IGN	7.6/10
Joystiq	3.5/5
Nintendo Life	6/10
PC Gamer (US)	7/10
Polygon	6/10

Costume Quest 2 received mixed scores from reviewers, who stated that the game's new methods and abilities added more charm to the game than the original. In their review, IGN stated, "Costume Quest 2's combat and story are both surprisingly good for an RPG that concludes in roughly a half-dozen hours. Navigation is iffy, and the healing system is a bit broken even after a major revision, but its humor and personality shine through to make this a good Halloween bounty."
