= Kinect Party =

2012 video game

- Developer: Double Fine Productions
- Publisher: Microsoft Studios
- Series: Double Fine Happy Action Theater
- Platform: Xbox 360
- Release: December 18, 2012
- Genre: Casual game
- Modes: Single-player, multiplayer

Kinect Party is the sequel to Double Fine Happy Action Theater, Double Fine's Kinect motion-sensing based casual video game for the Xbox 360. It was published by Microsoft in 2012. It was tentatively titled Double Fine Happy Action TV, before the game's final name was announced when the game was announced at PAX Prime 2012. The game was released on December 18, 2012. The game was delayed in Australia and New Zealand. It was added to the Xbox store for this region on March 29, 2013.

== Gameplay ==
Like its predecessor Happy Action Theater, Kinect Party is an open-ended game, providing thirty-six different modes that incorporate features of the Kinect motion-sensing and camera system. Players can select any one of the thirty-six modes, or opt to have the game randomly select modes and cycle through them every few minutes. The game can support the tracking of up to 6 players. The game will also allow the original eighteen mini games from Double Happy Action Theater, along with eighteen more playable mini games, will be able to be played from within Kinect Party if the player owns the former game as well.

Within most modes there are no goals, only to perform certain actions for the Kinect as to create humorous results in a form of augmented reality on the console's display. The game includes new modes, such as one where players can don virtual costumes (including ones based on Minecraft), create and destroy castles, and perform as if they were in a dubstep video. The sequel also introduces the ability to take and share photos from the various game modes.

== Development ==
Kinect Party was revealed to be in development on May 23, 2012 in an interview with the director of Double Fine Happy Action Theater, Tim Schafer, conducted by SF Weekly. Initial looks at the gameplay were shown by Double Fine during a "Quick Look" with members of the website Giant Bomb.

== Content ==
There are several options for game content. The "base game" is required. It is provided free of charge on the Xbox store. Then game content is purchased. There is a "Full Unlock" for $10, which includes all the channels from the previous game, Double Fine Happy Action Theater, as well as new Kinect Party channels. There is "Full Unlock for DFHAT Owners" at $5, which provides only the new Kinect Party channels. And there is the option to buy individual channels at $1 each. These channels are all included in the "Full Unlock".

== Reception ==
Reception

Aggregate score
Aggregator	Score
Metacritic	81/100

Review scores
Publication	Score
Destructoid	7/10
IGN	8.5/10
Official Xbox Magazine (US)	8.5/10

The game was well received by critics, with an 81/100 score at Metacritic. Casey Lynch from IGN, giving a score of 8.5/10, stated: "Kinect Party makes Kinect feel necessary. Unless you’re totally against fun, you’ll almost certainly have a great time."
