= Host Master and the Conquest of Humor =

2009 video game

- Logo
- Developer: Double Fine Productions
- Publisher: Double Fine Productions
- Designer: Klint Honeychurch
- Programmer: Klint Honeychurch
- Artist: Klint Honeychurch
- Writers: Tim Schafer; Klint Honeychurch
- Composer: Bert Chang
- Platform: Browser
- Release: WW: March 23, 2009
- Genre: Adventure
- Mode: Single-player

Host Master and the Conquest of Humor is a free Flash adventure game, written by Klint Honeychurch and game developer Tim Schafer, with gameplay and art by Honeychurch and music by Bert Chang. The game was published by Double Fine Productions, of which Schafer is president, and was originally playable on their website.

== Gameplay ==
Both the plot and gameplay of Host Master feature substantial amounts of metagaming. The style is a direct pastiche of the Lucasarts SCUMM adventure games, of which Schafer was one of the principal creators. The game uses Schafer himself as the protagonist, placing him backstage at the Game Developers Choice Awards, which he hosted in 2009. Schafer is unprepared for the event, and must scour his dressing room in an attempt to find jokes for his speech, a search which becomes increasingly implausible and comedic over the course of the game. The player can voluntarily finish the game at will; ending the game with most or all of the jokes found has the Award ceremony go well; ending with few or no jokes found has the award ceremony go so poorly that a riot breaks out which spreads into the downfall of civilization.

Footage of the game was screened before Schafer's actual appearance at the awards. The graphics, interface, puzzles and sense of humour are all directly modelled upon Schafer's own Lucasarts games, which include Maniac Mansion: Day of the Tentacle, and Full Throttle, as well as writing credits on the Monkey Island series. The dialogue in particular is notable, featuring Schafer's trademark wit and clever asides.

== Reception ==
Due to its association with Schafer, as well as the Game Developers Conference, Host Master received substantially more media attention than is usual for an online Flash game. It was reported on by Boing Boing's gaming subpage Offworld, GameSpot, GameSpy and Jay Is Games, with GameSpot remarking that 'although the graphic adventure genre has fallen into a rather small niche, Schafer and developer Klint Honeychurch clearly remember how to do the format justice'
