= Klint Honeychurch =

American video game designer

Clint Honeychurch
- Occupations: Graphic designer, video game designer, programmer, writer

Clint Honeychurch is an American graphic designer, video game designer, programmer, and writer. He designed Double Fine's free Adobe Flash games: the graphic adventure Host Master and the Conquest of Humor, sports game parody My Game About Me: Olympic Challenge, puzzle-platform game Tasha's Game, and fighting game Epic Saga: Extreme Fighter.

== Career ==
Clint Honeychurch was a graphic designer at Double Fine, working on their website and the user interface for their video games. While Brütal Legend was in production he designed flash games based on the Double Fine Comics and the company's designers. All of these games, Epic Saga: Extreme Fighter', My Game About Me: Olympic Challenge, Tasha's Game, and Host Master and the Conquest of Humor received widespread media attention.

== Recognition ==
Tasha's Game was nominated for "Best of Casual Gameplay 2008" in the platform browser games category from Jay is Games. Host Master and the Conquest of Humor was nominated for "Best of Casual Gameplay 2008" in the adventure browser games category from Jay is Games. GameSpot remarked that "although the graphic adventure genre has fallen into a rather small niche, Schafer and developer Clint Honeychurch clearly remember how to do the format justice".

== Games ==
- 2007 Epic Saga: Extreme Fighter, project leader (Double Fine)
- 2008 Tasha's Game, project leader (Double Fine)
- 2008 My Game About Me: Olympic Challenge, project leader (Double Fine)
- 2009 Host Master and the Conquest of Humor, project leader (Double Fine)
- 2009 Brütal Legend, flash user interface support (Double Fine)
- 2011 Iron Brigade, user interface concept and design (Double Fine)

== See also ==
- List of graphic designers
- List of programmers
- List of video game designers
- Video games in the United States
