= Costume Quest =

2010 role-playing video game

- Developer: Double Fine Productions
- Publishers: Double Fine Productions; THQ (consoles until 2013)
- Director: Tasha Harris
- Designers: David Gardner; Gabe Miller; Elliott Roberts
- Writers: Tim Schafer; Elliott Roberts
- Composer: Peter McConnell
- Series: Costume Quest
- Platforms: PlayStation 3, Xbox 360, Windows, OS X, Linux, iOS, Android
- Release: October 20, 2010: PlayStation 3, Xbox 360 October 20, 2010 Windows October 14, 2011 OS X, Linux May 8, 2013 iOS October 10, 2013 Android March 17, 2015
- Genre: Role-playing
- Mode: Single-player

Costume Quest is a party-based role-playing video game developed by Double Fine Productions and published by THQ on October 20, 2010. In the game, the player controls a child who is trick-or-treating with their twin on Halloween night when they encounter a monster that kidnaps their sibling. The player must travel around the local neighborhood collecting items for their costume, candy, and fellow children as companions in order to face the leader of the monsters and rescue their sibling. The costume aspects are used in turn-based battle segments, where the player character and companions are transformed into whatever they are dressed as to fight other monsters; the costume aspects are also used for abilities outside of battles.

A DLC expansion titled "Grubbins on Ice", was released on December 21, 2010, taking place after the events of the original game and set in the monster world of Repugia. A sequel, Costume Quest 2, was released in 2014.

== Gameplay ==
In battle, the children transform into giant versions of their costumes, and use their abilities to fight monsters.

Costume Quest incorporates elements of exploration of adventure games and character growth of role-playing video games. In the exploration part of the game, the player character explores their surrounding area, starting with their neighborhood, then a mall, and then a country town. In these areas the player can complete quests through trick-or-treating that reward the character with hints to the sibling's location, more candy (a type of currency for interactions with other children), and costume parts that can be used to alter the character's costume. The character can also befriend up to 4 non-player characters that can help with some aspects of quest solving.

At times, the player characters will encounter monsters, leading to the battle mode for the game. Here the children become giant versions of what costumes they are wearing, along with abilities reflected by that costume; for example, a child wearing a makeshift robot costume becomes a giant mechanized robot, while a child wearing a medieval sweater becomes a knight in armor and sword. Battles are turn-based, allowing the player to select attacks, blocks, or a special move that requires hitting a quick time event at the right moment to achieve maximum damage to their foes. Winning battles leads to additional rewards towards the player's main quest.

== Plot ==
The game takes place on Halloween. Fraternal twin siblings Reynold and Wren are new in their neighborhood and are asked by their mom to make new friends in the neighborhood. The player at this point chooses which sibling to play as, marking them as "in charge". The two dress in their costumes, with the non-playable character dressing as a piece of candy corn and the playable character dressing as a robot. A monster sees the non-playable sibling, and kidnaps him or her. The player character must now save their sibling in time and be home before curfew. The player character trick-or-treats at houses, tracking the monsters and their sibling from the neighborhood, then to a mall, and then to a country town. Along the way, they meet fellow trick-or-treaters Everett and Lucy, who join their party. Eventually the player character confronts the leader of the monsters, Dorsilla, who after defeating her reveals that she is actually working for a much more powerful monster named Cadaverous Big Bones. By defeating him, the player character rescues their sibling and returns home, banishing the monsters back to their home world.

=== "Grubbins on Ice" ===
"Grubbins on Ice" takes place after the original game in the Winter season. Everett and Lucy are searching for any evidence of the monsters that was left behind. Lucy finds a piece of evidence, which opens a portal that she is sucked into. Everett then takes Reynold and Wren with him to find and save Lucy, who has been taken captive by the monsters on the other side of the portal, which leads to the monster home world of Repugia. Similar to the original game, the player must trick-or-treat at various houses to eventually reach Cadaverous Big Bones, defeat him once more, and rescue Lucy. At the end of "Grubbins on Ice", the main characters escape from Repugia into a nexus of portals, which leads directly into the plot of Costume Quest 2.

== Development ==
Costume Quest is a result of a series of "Amnesia Fortnights" that Double Fine had used during the period of Brütal Legend's development when they were unsure of their publisher. During the Amnesia Fortnights, the team split into four smaller groups and worked on prototypes for potential future games, later presenting these to the rest of the Double Fine team for review. All four prototypes were well received internally, and the ideas were set aside once they began work on Brütal Legend again. Following completion of that game, Double Fine believed that Electronic Arts had authorized them to continue work on a Brütal Legend sequel, but discovered later that the sequel had been put on hold indefinitely, leaving the studio with no projects. Instead, Tim Schafer turned back to the Amnesia Fortnight products and sought to develop those as smaller games among several publishers. Two of them, Costume Quest and Stacking, were picked by THQ for publication as downloadable titles.

Costume Quest's development was led by Tasha Harris, Double Fine's lead animator and a former Pixar artist, with Tim Schafer providing support where needed, particularly in writing. The concept of the game was an idea that Harris had had prior to joining Double Fine, but never had a chance to expand on while at Pixar. She wanted the game to capture "that nostalgic feeling of these kids playing dress-up", and used old photographs of children in Halloween costumes to flesh out the game. Harris had mentioned the idea to Schafer, and Schafer chose her project as one of the four to be developed during the Amnesia Fortnights. Though Harris' original concept was not based on a role-playing game, she considers the game to have been influenced by older Nintendo and Square Enix games such as Dragon Quest and Final Fantasy, and games that take place in a modern setting like EarthBound and Pokémon. She also took cues from The Legend of Zelda series, where exploration would be paced through the acquisition of new items within the game. Harris stated that she wanted to "make a game that was like the RPGs that [she] loved growing up, but make it modernized so it looks cool and people enjoy playing it now" to take advantage of the growing popularity of titles available as downloadable content.

Unlike Double Fine's previous games, which had four to five year development cycles, Costume Quest was completed in under a year. The time frame and team size were based on Schafer's previous experience in developing The Secret of Monkey Island. Schafer reflected that this limited time scale was beneficial to their development process. The shortened schedule forced them to limit the scope of the game and prevented "feature creep", the addition of interesting but unnecessary gameplay elements. With limited scope, they were also able to focus on making the core gameplay features fun and enjoyable throughout the course of the game. There was also better communication through the smaller team, and with individual members given more control of their own responsibilities within the game. The work done on the game engine for Brütal Legend was "essential" for Costume Quest, allowing the team to quickly reuse the existing technology without the licensing costs for other third-party engines. Schafer estimated the total budget for the game at about $2 million. A software bug that interfered with game saving was discovered after release, and while Double Fine was able to isolate and correct it, the cost of certifying the patch, estimated to be about $40,000, prevented them from releasing it at first. They did release it later as a Title Update.

== Release ==
The game is a downloadable title and was released on October 20, 2010 on the PlayStation Network and Xbox Live Arcade services. A port to Microsoft Windows through the Steam platform was released about a year later. It was later released on Linux and OS X as part of the Double Fine Humble Bundle. The original Costume Quest prototype was released for Microsoft Windows as part of the Amnesia Fortnight 2012 bundle on November 19, 2012.

=== Expansions ===
An additional downloadable chapter, "Grubbins on Ice", was made available on December 21, 2010, alongside a free patch to correct some of the game's performance and gameplay problems. Taking place some time after the events of the main game while winter falls upon the kids, they find a portal to the monster's world, Repugia, where Lucy is captured by the monsters during a revolution. The other three kids don their costumes to help save Lucy. While many of the core game's features carry over into the add-on, new costumes and abilities are available in the expansion.

=== Windows version ===
Costume Quest was originally released as an Xbox 360 and PlayStation 3 downloadable game. According to Schafer, while they would have liked to create a version for Microsoft Windows, they as the developer did not have the final say on which platforms would be supported. Schafer commented that THQ did not see a financial benefit for creating the Windows version at the time.

However, a year after Costume Quest's initial release, a version of the game for Windows was released through the Steam platform. This version was funded by Steven Dengler's Dracogen Strategic Investments, who had also previously funded a OS X port of Double Fine's Psychonauts a few weeks before this new release. The Windows release includes the "Grubbins on Ice" content. Dengler had contacted Schafer and Double Fine in 2011 after Schafer jokingly sent a Twitter message about the cost of porting games like Costume Quest to other platforms. Though the initial discussions were humorous, Dengler soon entered into serious negotiations to provide the necessary funding for the porting; a full contract was completed within 18 days of Dengler's first message to the company. Though the full terms of the deal was not announced, Dengler stated that he didn't expect to make a large profit on the investment but to at least repay the investment "and then some".

Costume Quest, along with Stacking, were owned by publisher THQ at the time of their bankruptcy, and at the time, these assets were sold to Nordic Games. In November 2013, Double Fine and Nordic Games negotiated a deal for Double Fine to take over publishing rights for both games, while Nordic helped publish and distribute retail copies of these games and Double Fine's Psychonauts for OS X and Windows in early 2014.

=== Sequel ===
Costume Quest 2 was announced in March 2014, and was released on October 7 of that year. It was released for Linux, OS X, PlayStation 3, PlayStation 4, Wii U, Windows, Xbox 360, and Xbox One in October 2014.

Wren and Reynold return in the sequel, which introduces more costumes and features a "deeper and juicier" battle system according to Schafer. The game's plot involves Wren and Reynold traveling into both the past and the future in order to undo the actions of the evil time-traveling dentist Dr. Orel White, DDS.

=== Other media ===
Double Fine has teamed with Oni Press to produce a one-off comic book, Costume Quest: Invasion of the Candy Snatchers, written and drawn by Zac Gorman, to be released around the same time as the game sequel's release. Gorman had previously drawn a Costume Quest comic for his Magical Game Time webcomic series, which got the attention of Double Fine and led to this collaboration.

Frederator Studios had announced in May 2015 that it was producing an animated short based on Costume Quest. The short had been planned to be written and storyboarded by Zac Gorman and directed by Pat McHale. In February 2017, Frederator Studios announced the project has now become an animated series to be distributed as original programming for Amazon. For the series, Bryan Caselli and Will McRobb serve as the showrunners with Fred Seibert, Kevin Kolde and Eric Homan serving as executive producers. Having worked on the original short, Zac Gorman was initially approached as showrunner, but turned it down, though his style became crucial to the show's look, and he contributed as a writer on 2 episodes. Costume Quest is Frederator's first project with Amazon. The first half of season 1 was released on March 8, 2019. The second half of season 1 was released on October 11, 2019. A holiday special Heroes on Holiday was released on November 21, 2019.

== Reception ==
=== Costume Quest ===
Costume Quest

Aggregate scores
Aggregator	Score			
Aggregator	iOS	PC	PS3	Xbox 360
GameRankings	N/A	74%	N/A	N/A
Metacritic	75/100	N/A	77/100	74/100

Review scores
Publication	Score			
Publication	iOS	PC	PS3	Xbox 360
Edge	N/A	N/A	7/10	7/10
Eurogamer	N/A	N/A	8/10	N/A
Game Informer	N/A	N/A	6/10	6/10
GamePro	N/A	N/A	4.5/5	N/A
GamesMaster	N/A	N/A	N/A	70%
GameSpot	N/A	N/A	7/10	7/10
GameTrailers	N/A	N/A	N/A	7.2/10
GameZone	N/A	N/A	6/10	6/10
Giant Bomb	N/A	N/A	4/5	4/5
IGN	N/A	8/10	7.5/10	7.5/10
Joystiq	N/A	N/A	N/A	4/5
Official Xbox Magazine (US)	N/A	N/A	N/A	7.5/10
PlayStation: The Official Magazine	N/A	N/A	9/10	N/A
The A.V. Club	N/A	N/A	A−	N/A
Wired	N/A	N/A	N/A	8/10

Costume Quest received "generally favorable reviews" on all platforms except the Xbox 360 version, which received "average" reviews, according to the review aggregation website Metacritic. Reviewers frequently praised the game's art style, humor, and Halloween setting, while several considered it too short and its turn-based combat simple or repetitive. GameSpot described it as charming but found the combat basic, and Game Informer similarly felt the gameplay did not match the game's presentation.The game was given the "Best Downloadable Game" award at the 2010 Spike Video Game Awards.

=== Grubbins on Ice ===
Costume Quest: Grubbins on Ice

Aggregate score
Aggregator	Score	
Aggregator	PS3	Xbox 360
Metacritic	N/A	83/100

Review scores
Publication	Score	
Publication	PS3	Xbox 360
Destructoid	N/A	8/10
GamesMaster	69%	N/A
The Escapist	N/A	4/5

The Xbox 360 version of the Grubbins on Ice DLC received "favorable" reviews according to Metacritic.
