= Tim Schafer =

American video game designer

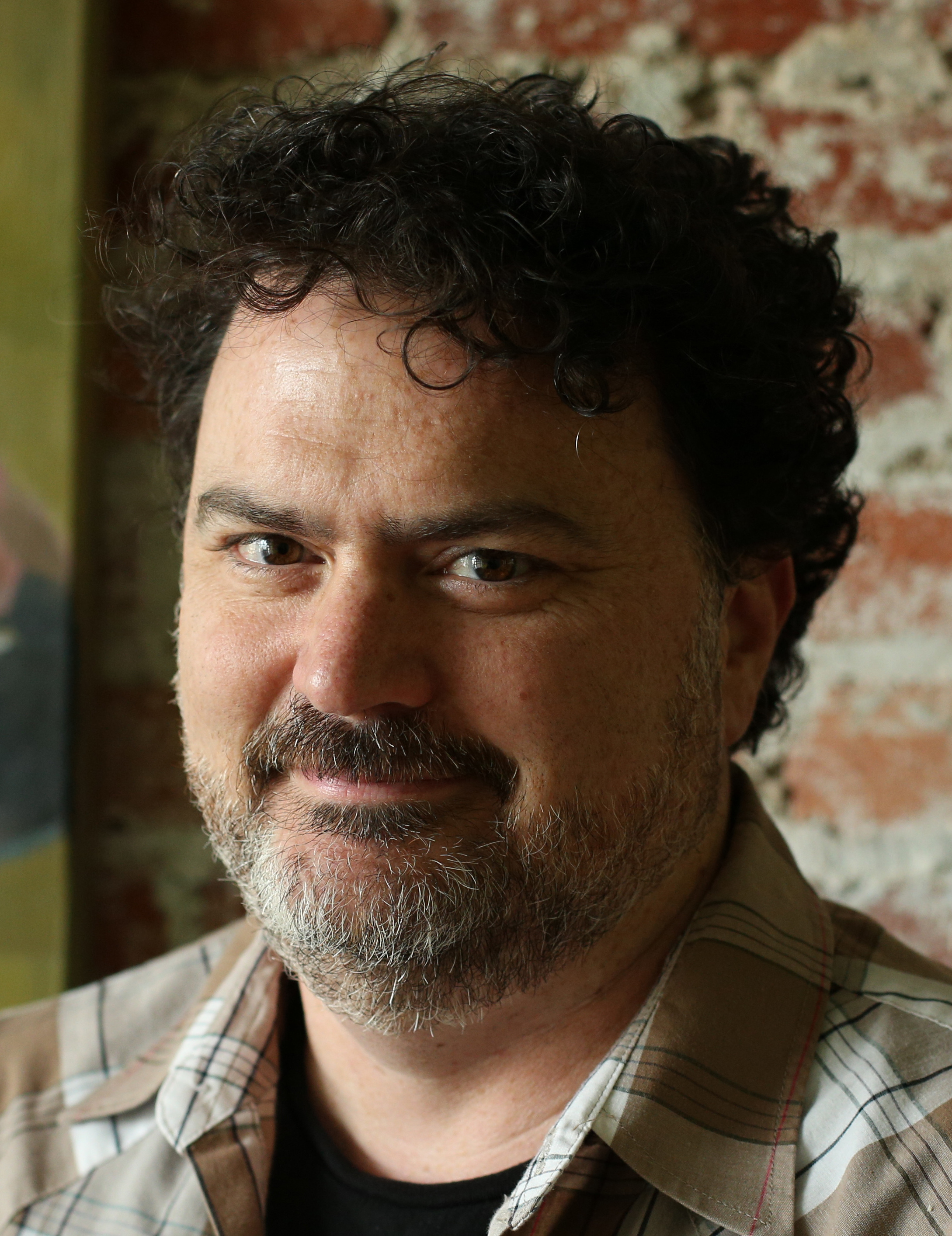
- Schafer in 2016
- Born: Timothy John Schafer; July 26, 1967 (age 59); Sonoma, California, U.S.
- Occupations: Game designer, game programmer, game writer
- Spouse: Rachael Schafer
- Awards: BAFTA Fellowship (2018)

Timothy John Schafer (born July 26, 1967) is an American video game designer. He founded Double Fine Productions in July 2000, after having spent over a decade at LucasArts. Schafer is best known as the designer of critically acclaimed games Full Throttle, Grim Fandango, Psychonauts, Brütal Legend and Broken Age, co-designer of Day of the Tentacle, and assistant designer on The Secret of Monkey Island and Monkey Island 2: LeChuck's Revenge. He is well known in the video game industry for his storytelling and comedic writing style, and has been given both a Lifetime Achievement Award from the Game Developers Choice Awards, and a BAFTA Fellowship for his contributions to the industry.

== Career ==
=== College and LucasArts (1989–2000) ===
Tim Schafer was born on July 26, 1967, in Sonoma, California, the youngest of five children. His father was a doctor and his mother was a nurse. While studying computer science at UC Berkeley, Schafer became interested in writing, and took inspiration from Kurt Vonnegut, who while a publicist at General Electric wrote short stories in the evenings. Schafer opted for a similar course, interning to help develop databases for small companies while trying to position himself for an opening in a larger corporation such as Atari and Hewlett-Packard, but he was rejected by these. He saw an offering at Lucasfilm Games, looking for programmers who could also write game dialog, which piqued his interest.

During his application process for the job, he had a somewhat disastrous phone interview with David Fox in which he mentioned being a fan of Ballblaster. Fox informed him that the Lucasfilm Games title was Ballblazer, and that only the pirated version was known as Ballblaster, but despite the misstep, Fox asked Schafer to submit his resume for further consideration. To make up for the phone interview, Schafer sent in a comic of himself applying for and getting the job at Lucasfilm Games, drawn as a text adventure.

Schafer was hired by LucasArts in 1989, and his first position was as a "scummlet", a programmer who helped to implement features and ideas proposed by the lead game developers within the LucasArts SCUMM engine. He, alongside Dave Grossman, helped to playtest Indiana Jones and the Last Crusade: The Action Game and implement the NES version of Maniac Mansion. Schafer and Grossman, along with two others, were taught by Ron Gilbert as part of a "SCUMM University" on how to use the engine to set up rooms and puzzles.

Later, Gilbert approached Schafer and Grossman, offering them the chance to work on his new project, which would ultimately become the pirate-themed adventure game The Secret of Monkey Island.

According to series creator Gilbert, Schafer and Grossman were responsible for about two thirds of the game's dialogue. The Secret of Monkey Island became one of the most acclaimed games of its kind. The same team created the sequel, Monkey Island 2: LeChuck's Revenge.

In his first lead role on a game project, Schafer co-designed (with Dave Grossman) Day of the Tentacle, a time-travel comedy adventure and the sequel to Ron Gilbert's Maniac Mansion. Schafer's first solo project, the biker adventure Full Throttle, was released in 1995. He went on to design the highly acclaimed Grim Fandango, a noir adventure game set in the Aztec afterlife featuring characters similar to the papier-mâché skeleton decorations from the Mexican holiday Dia De Los Muertos. Grim Fandango won many awards, including GameSpot's Game of the Year award of 1998, and Computer Adventure Game of the Year at the 2nd Annual Interactive Achievement Awards.

=== Double Fine Productions (2000–present) ===
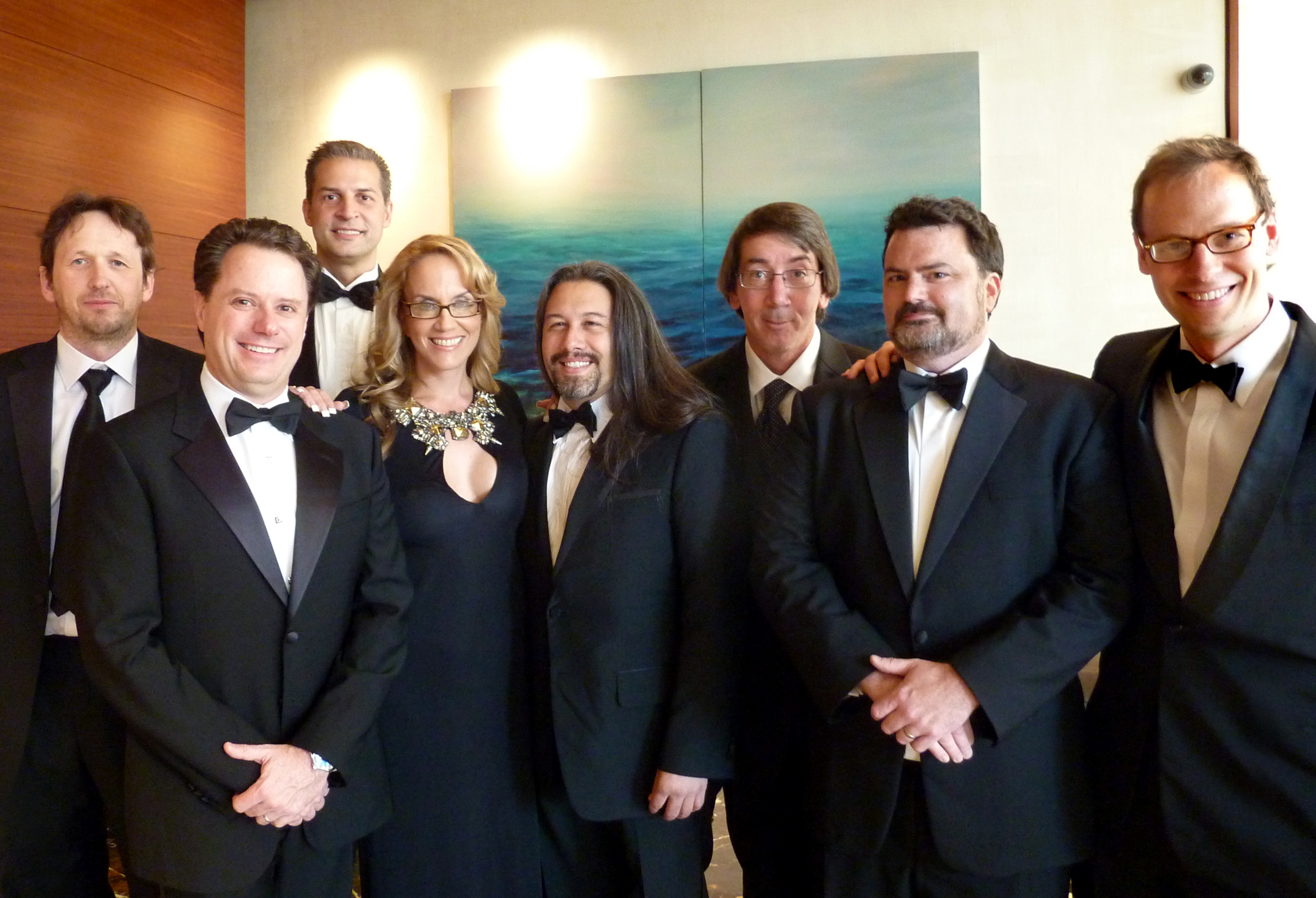
Schafer and other game developers at a BAFTA event in Los Angeles in July 2011. From left: Rod Humble, Louis Castle, David Perry, Brenda Brathwaite, John Romero, Will Wright, Tim Schafer, Chris Hecker.

Schafer worked on an unannounced PlayStation 2 action-adventure game at LucasArts, but it never entered production. Prior to his departure, a number of other developers were leaving LucasArts as the studio shifted away from adventure games. Schafer was approached by his colleagues with the idea of leaving the company to develop PlayStation 2 games on their own; Schafer was initially wary of this believing he felt secure in his position at LucasArts. He left the company in January 2000, to found Double Fine Productions, where he created the platform game Psychonauts. The game was first released on Xbox in North America on April 19, 2005. While the game was met with critical acclaim, including a Game of the Year award from Eurogamer, it sold poorly at its initial release and led to financial troubles for its publisher Majesco. Double Fine reacquired full rights to Psychonauts by 2012, allowing them to release the game with improvements for modern systems, and in that year, Schafer stated that "We made more on Psychonauts [in 2012] than we ever have before."

On March 7, 2007, he hosted the annual Game Developers Choice Awards. He later hosted it again in 2009. To coincide, Double Fine released a free Flash minigame entitled Host Master and the Conquest of Humor, a pastiche of Schafer's LucasArts games in which the player takes on the role of Schafer backstage at the GDC Awards.

Schafer led the development of Double Fine's next game, Brütal Legend, released on October 13, 2009, after a tortuous development route due to having its original publisher Vivendi Games drop the title following its merge with Activision in 2008 to be picked up later by Electronic Arts. The game was Schafer's tribute to the music and art of heavy metal and featured voice acting from actor/musician Jack Black and cameos from rock musicians including Lemmy Kilmister, Rob Halford, Ozzy Osbourne and Lita Ford. Schafer said "For Brütal Legend, I've always seen this overlap between medieval warfare and heavy metal. You see heavy metal singers and they'll have like a brace around their arm and they'll be singing about Orcs. So let's just make a world where that all happens. That all gets put together, the heavy metal, and the rock, and the battling, actually does happen. Let's not flirt around with this; let's just do it."

During Brütal Legend's development, Schafer had Double Fine's staff take two weeks away from the game's development to participate in Amnesia Fortnights once a year starting in 2007. This was an internal game jam where the company was split into four teams to make a pitchable game prototype, an idea he compared to what film director Wong Kar-Wai had used previously. After Brütal Legend's release, the game had generally positive reviews but did not perform as well as expected, and Electronic Arts cancelled the preliminary work Double Fine had started on the sequel. To keep Double Fine above water financially, Schafer went back to the past Amnesia Fortnight projects and selected games they could reasonably expand into full releases. From these, four smaller games were picked up by publishers, and were the first games in Double Fine's history to have project leaders other than Schafer: Costume Quest, Stacking, Iron Brigade and Once upon a Monster. The titles helped to keep Double Fine financially stable, and Schafer has continued to implement the Amnesia Fortnight as a yearly process; most of the games that result from these are led by someone other than Schafer.

On February 1, 2012, Schafer returned to the role of director in the Kinect-based Double Fine Happy Action Theater, a game concept he devised based on Once Upon a Monster to be able to play a game with his two-year-old daughter that she would be able to enjoy as well.

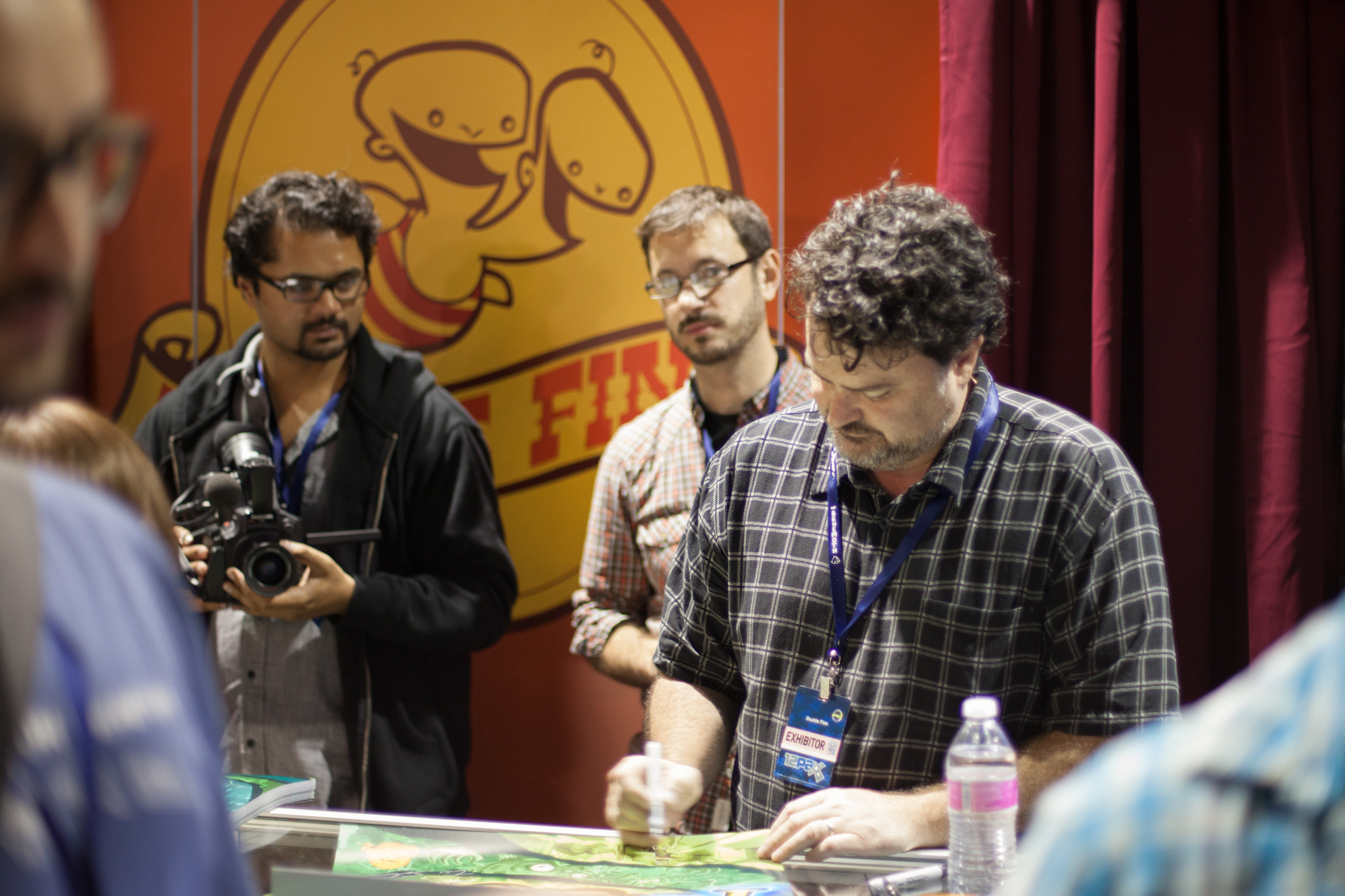
Schafer and 2 Player Productions at PAX Prime 2012

In February 2012, Schafer launched a crowdfunded project for an unnamed adventure game via the crowd-sourced Kickstarter, using the placeholder title "Double Fine Adventure"; Schafer stated that he had found publishers extremely wary of an adventure in the current video game industry, and decided to turn to crowdfunding to seek player interest. The game and accompanying documentary were projected to cost US$400,000 dollars. Contributions exceeded that amount by more than three times in less than 24 hours, making it the first Kickstarter project to reach a $2 million figure, and the second most successful project on the website at the time. When the project ended on March 13, funding reached a level of $3,336,371 in Kickstarter with an additional $110,000 from premium pledges. Ultimately, the project culminated in Broken Age, released in two acts over 2014 and 2015.

Schafer and Double Fine had been able to negotiate with The Walt Disney Company, who acquired Lucasfilm in 2012, to obtain the rights to three of the titles that Schafer had directed there: Day of the Tentacle, Full Throttle, and Grim Fandango, by 2014. Double Fine subsequently released remastered versions of all three games over the following years.

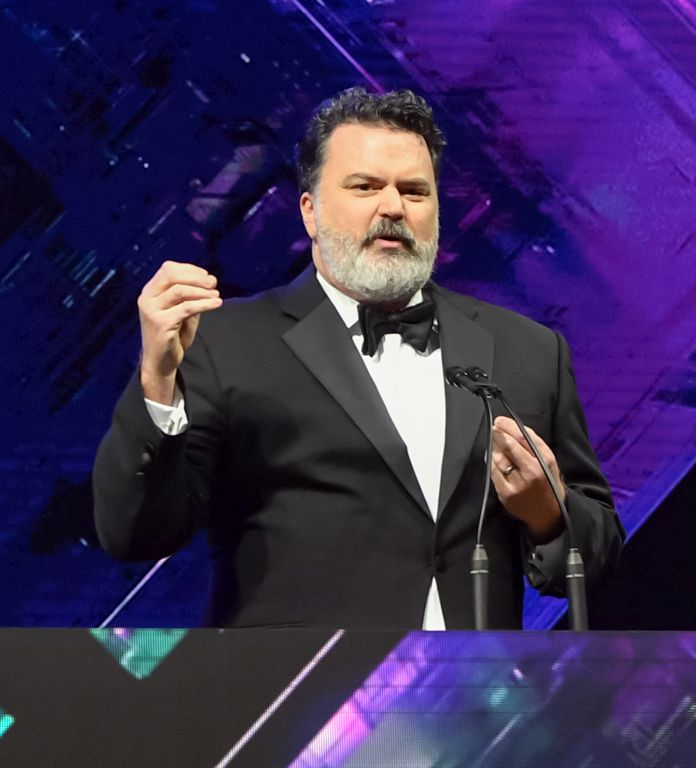
Schafer has frequently served as host of the Game Developers Choice Awards, including in 2019.

Schafer stood in support of Anita Sarkeesian and other game developers that were being harassed by supporters of Gamergate, a loosely organized misogynistic online harassment campaign and a right-wing backlash against feminism, that started in August 2014.

Schafer hosted the 2015 Game Developer’s Choice Awards on March 5; during the event one of his jokes referenced the #NotYourShield tag connected to the harassment Campaign. Gamergate supporters claimed #NotYourShield was used to demonstrate women and minorities supported their cause, but Schafer's remarks spoke to the wider assessment that the tag's use was largely composed of sockpuppets. Following the event, Gamergate supporters targeted Schafer for harassment by claiming he had been making a joke that mocked the minorities using this hashtag.

Gamergate supporters also found other opportunities to target Schafer for harassment, including a decision to expand the scope of Broken Age after its Kickstarter crowdfunding campaign raised far more than the amount asked for, and a later decision to seek additional funding for the studio by offering the game's first half for sale on early access. Since then he continues to be an occasional target of harassment from either GamerGate supporters or those who were swayed by the campaign's claims.

Schafer joined with other industry leaders with crowdfunding experience to help create the crowdfunding platform Fig in August 2015, serving on its advisory board until March 2020. Through Fig, Schafer announced the sequel Psychonauts 2 in December 2015.

In June 2019, Microsoft announced that it had acquired Double Fine as part of Xbox Game Studios. Schafer stated that while he had not been looking to be acquired, he found the opportunity in his talks with Microsoft to be promising; the acquisition would not affect Double Fine's independence and would still allow the company to publish its pending titles on its own choice of platforms, and would provide the financial security needed for Double Fine to be able to concentrate on developing a quality product. Through this support, Double Fine was able to retain several gameplay elements within Psychonauts 2, which was eventually released on August 25, 2021, to critical praise.

== Influences and philosophy ==
In an interview at the Game Developers Conference in 2003, Schafer stated that he strives for integrating story into the gameplay, setting a creative goal of someday creating a video game without any cutscenes at all. Furthermore, he said he often sets a story in an established world:

"[O]ften, the world is the initial inspiration for the game. One day I was listening to someone tell me their stories of spending the summer in Alaska. They had hung around this one biker bar, with these people with names like Smilin' Rick and Big Phil. And I thought, 'Wow, what a crazy world that is.' It's so apart from everybody's life, and yet it's right there, it's so mundane in a way. And that's where Full Throttle came from."

== Recognition ==
The press first previewed Psychonauts at the E3 trade show in 2002, where it won the Game Critics Award for Best Original Game. An hour-long episode of Icons on the G4 Network documented the last week of the production of Psychonauts and explored Schafer's career. At the 2006 Game Developers Choice Awards, Schafer and Erik Wolpaw won the award for Best Writing for Psychonauts. Schafer and Double Fine Executive Producer & COO Caroline Esmurdoc also won the award for Best New Studio. In October 2006, Schafer received a BAFTA video game Best Screenplay award for Psychonauts. In 2012, the Australian Centre for the Moving Image (ACMI) organized the "Game Masters" exhibition, where Schafer was featured as the creator of Grim Fandango, among a few other visionary designers, credited for having "pushed the boundaries of game design and storytelling, introducing new genres, creating our best-loved characters and revolutionising the way we understand and play games" In 2015, he won the Vanguard Award at Bilbao's Fun & Serious Game Festival. Schafer received the Lifetime Achievement Award from the Game Developers Choice Awards in March 2018. He received a BAFTA Fellowship as "a true pioneer of game design, who has pushed the boundaries of the medium through his extraordinary talents" at the British Academy Games Awards in April 2018. In February 2023, Schafer was recognized as "a beacon of creativity and innovation in the games industry" by being selected as a Hall of Fame Inductee at the 26th Annual D.I.C.E. Awards by the Academy of Interactive Arts & Sciences.

== Ludography ==
Name	Year	Credited With	Publisher
The Secret of Monkey Island	1990	co-writer, programmer, assistant designer	LucasArts
Monkey Island 2: LeChuck's Revenge	1991	co-writer, programmer, assistant designer	LucasArts
Day of the Tentacle	1993	co-designer, co-producer, co-director, co-writer	LucasArts
Full Throttle	1995	project leader, writer, designer	LucasArts
The Curse of Monkey Island	1997	additional design	LucasArts
Grim Fandango	1998	project leader, writer, designer, programmer	LucasArts
Star Wars Episode I: Racer	1999	"never actively tried to sabotage the project"	LucasArts
Psychonauts	2005	creative director, co-writer, designer	Double Fine, Majesco
Brütal Legend	2009	creative director, writer, co-designer	Double Fine, Electronic Arts
Costume Quest	2010	studio creative director, co-writer	Double Fine, THQ
Stacking	2011	studio creative director	Double Fine, THQ
Iron Brigade	2011	studio creative director	Double Fine, Microsoft Studios
Sesame Street: Once Upon a Monster	2011	studio creative director, writer	Double Fine, Warner Bros. Interactive Entertainment
Haunt	2012	voice actor	NanaOn-Sha, Zoë Mode, Microsoft Studios
Double Fine Happy Action Theater	2012	director	Double Fine, Microsoft Studios
Middle Manager of Justice	2012	studio creative director	Double Fine, Dracogen
Kinect Party	2012	studio creative director	Double Fine, Microsoft Studios
The Cave	2013	studio creative director	Double Fine, Sega
Dropchord	2013	studio creative director	Double Fine, Dracogen
Broken Age	2014	director, writer	Double Fine
Spacebase DF-9	2014	studio creative director	Double Fine, Indie Fund
Grim Fandango Remastered	2015	creative director	Double Fine
Massive Chalice	2015	studio creative director	Double Fine
Day of the Tentacle Remastered	2016	creative director	Double Fine
Headlander	2016	studio creative director	Double Fine, Adult Swim Games
Psychonauts in the Rhombus of Ruin	2017	studio creative director, writer	Double Fine
Full Throttle Remastered	2017	creative director	Double Fine
Psychonauts 2	2021	creative director, writer	Double Fine, Xbox Game Studios
Keeper	2025	studio creative director	Double Fine, Xbox Game Studios
