= Advance and Vanquish =

Studio album by 3 Inches of Blood
- Released: September 28, 2004
- Recorded: May – June 2004
- Studio: Engine Studios (Chicago, Illinois)
- Genres: Heavy metal; power metal; thrash metal
- Length: 50:33
- Label: Roadrunner
- Producer: Neil Kernon

3 Inches of Blood chronology
| Battlecry Under a Wintersun (2002) | Advance and Vanquish (2004) | Fire Up the Blades (2007) |

Singles from Advance and Vanquish
- 1. "Deadly Sinners" Released: 2004

Professional ratings
Review scores
| Source | Rating |
|---|---|
| Allmusic | 3.5/5 stars |
| Metal Temple | 9/10 stars |

Advance and Vanquish is the second studio album by Canadian heavy metal band 3 Inches of Blood. It was released on September 28, 2004, and was their first release by Roadrunner Records. It is the only release by the band to feature bassist and drummer Brian Redman and Matt Wood respectively, and the last to feature original guitarists Sunny Dhak and Bobby Froese who later went on to reform their previous band Pride Tiger. The cover art was illustrated by Edward Repka who has also designed album covers for such acclaimed bands as Megadeth and Death.

== Track listing ==
All tracks are written by 3 Inches of Blood.

| No. | Title | Length |
|---|---|---|
| 1. | "Fear on the Bridge (Upon the Boiling Sea I)" | 3:14 |
| 2. | "Deadly Sinners" | 4:31 |
| 3. | "Revenge Is a Vulture" | 3:26 |
| 4. | "Dominion of Deceit" | 4:18 |
| 5. | "Premonition of Pain" | 4:35 |
| 6. | "Lord of the Storm (Upon the Boiling Sea II)" | 5:05 |
| 7. | "Wykydtron" | 3:52 |
| 8. | "Swordmaster" | 4:24 |
| 9. | "Axes of Evil" | 4:28 |
| 10. | "Crazy Nights" | 3:18 |
| 11. | "Destroy the Orcs" | 2:21 |
| 12. | "The Phantom of the Crimson Cloak" | 3:11 |
| 13. | "Isle of Eternal Despair (Upon the Boiling Sea III)" | 3:51 |

Bonus tracks
| No. | Title | Length |
|---|---|---|
| 14. | "Quest for the Manticore" (Japanese bonus track) | 4:04 |

=== Song meanings ===
Through interviews, vocalist Jamie Hooper has revealed the meanings and themes of the songs from Advance and Vanquish:

- "Fear on the Bridge" is the first part of a pirate trilogy entitled "Upon the Boiling Sea". The second part is the sixth track, "Lord of the Storm" and the third is the thirteenth track, "Isle of Eternal Despair". The trilogy is mainly about greed and punishment and was inspired by the music of German power metal band Running Wild. A fourth track entitled "Die For Gold (Upon The Boiling Sea IV)" also appears on the album Long Live Heavy Metal, released on March 15, 2012.
- "Deadly Sinners" is about a fictionalized glory of heavy metal, and those who unsuccessfully attempt to destroy it.
- "Revenge Is a Vulture" is "about something that you've set out to finally accomplish," as stated by vocalist Jamie Hooper.
- "Dominion of Deceit" is the band's "pagan power song," also stated by Hooper. It tells a story about heathens uniting to rise against the sanctity of the church.
- "Premonition of Pain" is about a soothsayer who alerts his king about forecoming dangers, but the king would not listen and is defeated because of his own folly.
- "Wykydtron" is about a cyborg created to serve mankind, who eventually becomes out of control. The story of the name of the song as follows: "An unnamed band that opened for us wasn't very good," explains Hooper. "Somebody ripped their name off a poster and wrote in 'Wykydtron.' I don't know what it means, but it sounded cool and futuristic. So we developed it into a space-themed tale of cyborg warfare."
- "Swordmaster" is about the revenge of a knight.
- "Axes of Evil" is based on human greed. In the words of Hooper, "people with good intentions, once given the power sometimes don't know what to do with it, and that's where that one is coming from." Similarities can also be drawn to the human storyline of the game WarCraft 3, which Pipes has commented as having influenced the song.
- "Crazy Nights" was written by vocalist Cam Pipes about a good time the band had in London, where they got into a bar fight in New Cross.
- "Destroy the Orcs" was inspired by the work of J. R. R. Tolkien, and also about revenge. It is a re-recording of a song from the band's 2002 debut album Battlecry Under a Wintersun.
- "The Phantom of the Crimson Cloak" is about a creature that feeds on human flesh and hunts and kills anyone who crosses its path in the night.

== Personnel ==
- Cam Pipes – clean vocals
- Jamie Hooper – screaming vocals
- Sunny Dhak – lead guitar
- Bobby Froese – rhythm guitar
- Brian Redman – bass
- Matt Wood – drums
- Brian Deck – drum technician
- Mike Gitter – a&r
- Neil Kernon – producer, engineer
- UE Nastasi – mastering
- Edward Repka – cover art
- Colin Richardson – mixing
- Dan Turner – mixing assistant

== Trivia ==
- "Destroy the Orcs" is a re-recording of a song from the band's debut album. A second song from their debut album, "Ride Darkhorse, Ride", was also re-recorded during these sessions, but has yet to be released.
- The album's only single, "Deadly Sinners", is featured in the video game Tony Hawk's Underground 2, although the version heard on the game is a demo, containing no lead guitar solo and having rougher vocal tracks. The album version can be heard in Saints Row 2, on the metal radio station, Krunch 106.66. The song is also featured in the PlayStation 3/Xbox 360 videogame Brütal Legend, along with "Destroy the Orcs". The "headbangers" from Brütal Legend also appear to be styled on the army from this album cover. The song is also used in a parody video by Brandon Hardesty in his "Extreme Toothbrushing" video. YouTube user "indrancole3" also uses the song in his "EXTREME MOVIE WATCHING", "EXTREME BREAKFAST" and "EXTREME EXORCISM" videos.
