= Fire Up the Blades =

Studio album by 3 Inches of Blood
- Released: June 26, 2007
- Recorded: November 2006
- Studio: Armoury Studios in Vancouver, British Columbia
- Genres: Heavy metal, power metal, thrash metal
- Length: 51:52
- Label: Roadrunner
- Producer: Joey Jordison

3 Inches of Blood chronology
Advance and Vanquish (2004)	Fire Up the Blades (2007)	Here Waits Thy Doom (2009)

Professional ratings
Review scores
Source	Rating
AllMusic	link
Kerrang!	4/5 stars
Stylus Magazine	(A−) link

Fire Up the Blades is the third studio album by Canadian heavy metal band 3 Inches of Blood. It was released on June 26, 2007 by Roadrunner Records and is the band's final release through the label. It is also the first release by the band to feature lead guitarist Justin Hagberg, rhythm guitarist Shane Clark, bassist Nick Cates and drummer Alexei Rodriguez, the latter of whom was kicked out of the band six months later.

== Background and recording ==
The band confirmed in February 2006 that they had begun to write new material, and by then had about four songs prepared to appear on the forthcoming album.

Fire Up the Blades marks the first major role of Joey Jordison of Slipknot and Murderdolls, as a producer, who revealed that he'd been a fan of the band since their first studio album, Battlecry Under a Wintersun.

Prior to the album's release, the band stressed that Fire Up the Blades would be "darker, tighter and more dangerous" than their Roadrunner Records debut. "This album is heavily influenced by low quality beer, bong rips and listening to black metal in the dark," says Hooper. "It doesn't sound blatantly black metal, it still sounds like us. But it's a faster, more intense version of us."

A sampler containing demo versions of "The Goatriders Horde" and "Night Marauders" began circulating the Internet in March 2007. This sampler may have been bootlegged however, as a demo version of "Night Marauders" was previously released that January on a free CD issued with that month's edition of Metal Hammer magazine. The demo of "The Goatriders Horde" was also most likely ripped from a stream of the song which was made available on Roadrunner Records' website.

On at least one occasion since the firing of drummer Alexei Rodriguez, the band has performed live with Jordison as drummer.

== Lyrical themes ==
- "Trial of Champions" is about an enslaved gladiator who fights his way to victory, and ultimately kills the emperor. This is a reference to the Fighting Fantasy game book of the same name, which features a similar plot.
- "God of the Cold White Silence" references Ithaqua, a Great Old One in the Cthulhu Mythos of H. P. Lovecraft.
- "Forest King" is about flora and fauna taking revenge on humanity.
- "The Great Hall of Feasting" is about the massive dining halls of Valhalla.
- "The Hydra's Teeth" refers to Jason and the Argonauts on their quest for the Golden Fleece.

== Track listing ==
All tracks are written by 3 Inches of Blood and Joey Jordison.

No.	Title	Length
1.	"Through the Horned Gate"	2:07
2.	"Night Marauders"	4:15
3.	"The Goatriders Horde"	4:02
4.	"Trial of Champions"	3:39
5.	"God of the Cold White Silence"	4:24
6.	"Forest King"	5:16
7.	"Demon's Blade"	4:10
8.	"The Great Hall of Feasting"	3:53
9.	"Infinite Legions"	4:55
10.	"Assassins of the Light"	3:20
11.	"Black Spire"	5:23
12.	"The Hydra's Teeth"	4:49
13.	"Rejoice in the Fires of Man's Demise"	1:33

B-sides
No.	Title	Length
1.	"Key to Oblivion"	4:09
2.	"Nocturnal Command"	5:21
3.	"In The Time of Job When Mammon Was A Yippie" (Lucifer's Friend cover)	3:35
4.	"Diamonds of the Black Chest" (Running Wild cover)	3:04
5.	"Piranha" (Exodus cover)	3:31

== Personnel ==
- Cam Pipes – clean vocals
- Jamie Hooper – screaming vocals
- Justin Hagberg – guitars
- Shane Clark – guitars
- Nick Cates – bass
- Alexei Rodriguez – drums
- Joey Jordison – producer
- Zeuss – mixer
- Dan Turner – engineer

== Release history ==
Country	Release date
Japan	May 28, 2007
Worldwide	June 26, 2007
