= Brütal Legend =

2009 video game

- Developer: Double Fine Productions
- Publishers: Electronic Arts; Double Fine Productions (PC)
- Director: Tim Schafer
- Producer: Gabe Miller
- Designer: Erik Robson
- Programmer: Nathan Martz
- Artist: Scott Campbell
- Writer: Tim Schafer
- Composer: Peter McConnell
- Platforms: PlayStation 3; Xbox 360; Windows; Linux; macOS
- Release: October 13, 2009: PS3, Xbox 360; NA: October 13, 2009; AU: October 15, 2009; EU: October 16, 2009; Windows; WW: February 26, 2013; macOS, Linux; WW: May 7, 2013
- Genres: Action-adventure, real-time strategy
- Modes: Single-player, multiplayer

Brütal Legend is an action-adventure video game with real-time strategy elements created by Double Fine and published by Electronic Arts for the PlayStation 3 and Xbox 360. The game was released during October 2009 in North America, Europe, and Australia. Though Brütal Legend was originally to be published by Vivendi Games prior to its merger with Activision, Activision dropped the game from its portfolio after the merger. It was later picked up by Electronic Arts, though Activision and Double Fine brought counter-lawsuits against each other over publishing issues. The issues were settled out of court. Later, Double Fine announced a port of the game for Microsoft Windows via Steam, which was released in February 2013. macOS and Linux versions of the game were made available as part of the Humble Bundle in May 2013. A physical collector's edition for Windows, macOS, and Linux was released by IndieBox in October 2014.

Tim Schafer, the game's creative director, was inspired to create the game by his own past musical experiences. The game features the character of Eddie Riggs (voiced by and modeled after Jack Black), a roadie who is transported to a fantasy world inspired by the artwork of heavy metal album covers. Eddie becomes the world's savior, leading the down-trodden humans against a range of supernatural overlords using a battle axe, his Flying V guitar that can tap into the magical powers of the world, and a customizable hot rod.

The game, a hybrid of the action-adventure and real-time strategy genres, includes Stage Battles in both the single-player and multiplayer mode, where the player must command troops to defeat their foes while defending their own stage. In addition to Black, the game features voices of heavy metal musicians including Lemmy Kilmister, Rob Halford, Ozzy Osbourne and Lita Ford and other celebrities such as Tim Curry, as well as more than one hundred metal songs selected by Schafer for inclusion in the game.

Brütal Legend was generally well received by game reviewers, praising Schafer's vision and writing of the heavy metal–inspired world, and the performances of the voice cast, particularly Black and Osbourne. Some felt that the hybrid gameplay of action and real-time strategy did not mix well, however, blaming console control limitations and missing features normally found in games of either genre.

== Gameplay ==
Brütal Legend is a third person action-adventure game incorporating real time strategy elements. The game uses an open world that Tim Schafer has described as being approximately 40 square miles (100 km^{2}) in area. The player controls the protagonist Eddie Riggs, a roadie who one day finds himself transported into a heavy metal–themed fantasy world. Eddie acquires three tools that are used for combat and transportation: a broad axe called "The Separator", his Flying V guitar "Clementine" from his own world which has the ability to cast magic spells in the heavy metal world, and a hot rod that Eddie builds called "The Druid Plow", a.k.a. "The Deuce". Spells, referred to as "Solos", from Clementine are performed by playing a minigame akin to the note-matching aspect of Guitar Hero or Rock Band over a brief guitar riff; however, Eddie cannot use the metal generated by Clementine constantly, as prolonged usage of the guitar will cause it to overheat, and the player will have to wait for a cool-off period before using the guitar's power again. Eddie may also find more solos hidden throughout the world, ranging from support to offensive spells. The player can spend in-game currency called "Fire Tributes", earned from completing missions, at the Motor Forge to gain new abilities and upgrades for each tool. These tools can be used in combination with each other to take out Eddie's foes; for example, the player can use his guitar Clementine to create pyrotechnics to launch a foe into the air and follow up by attack it with the Separator axe. In a case of a specific boss fight, the player must use the Deuce hot rod to lure the boss to a spiked gate held up by counterweights, and then play the "Earthshaker" move on Clementine to destroy the weights and sever the creature's head.

Within the open world, the player can use a map and the Deuce's turn signals to guide them towards either story-advancing missions or side missions. Side missions include hot-rod races against a demon, defending Eddie's allies from a pending attack, or helping a cannon operator spot his targets. There are about 23 main missions in the story with 30 side missions that the player can optionally take. The player can also explore the game's world to find statues bound in leather or chains that can be freed to gain a health boost for Eddie or to reveal part of the game's backstory, and can look through special telescopes at vistas or complete certain jumps to earn additional Fire Tributes. The player can also find monuments they can raise that unlock an additional heavy metal song from the game's soundtrack that can be played on the Deuce's radio, "The Mouth of Metal"; the player can further customize its set list with songs they have been rewarded with or have collected.

The single-player and multiplayer modes of Brütal Legend feature Stage Battles where players command armies to defend their concert stage while attacking others' stages.

Several main story missions of the game are Stage Battles based on real time strategy elements. The player, while still in control of Eddie, is required to defend a giant stage where new allies will spawn, holding out until a specific objective is completed. The player creates an army for attacks by building merchandise booths on "fan geysers" through Clementine's magic. Once enough fans are collected, the player can summon different allies, each consuming a specific number of fans, or upgrade their stage to allow them to produce more powerful allies. A character known as Mangus acts as the "sound guy" to help in the construction of these units and stage upgrades, and also warns the player of enemy attacks. Once the player has gathered their army, they can then seek out and attack their opponents. Eddie is able to control the entire army to follow, attack, or defend a point, and can use specialized squads of specific units to perform certain tasks, such as having a group of headbangers use their headbanging to destroy statues, hoisting a groupie onto his shoulders to use her weapon for focused long-range attacks, or mounting allied vehicles or beasts to take control and provide support or extra firepower. The player can also use Eddie directly in combat during these battles. Ultimately, Eddie transforms into a winged demon who can fly above the battlefields to issue orders or lay out attacks. Spells in Eddie's arsenal can help control the performance of his armies, such as temporarily boosting their attack skills or creating a rally flag which troops will gather at, while others hinder the performance of the enemy faction by removing enemy buffs or preventing the creation of enemy units for a short time. Each of the different units, including special allies that Eddie meets in the game, has a special co-op move they can perform with Eddie; for example, Eddie's first ally, Ophelia, can be tossed at foes by Eddie in the style of the Fastball Special. These co-op moves are also available outside of Stage Battle missions.

The game has a multiplayer mode, described by Schafer as "your typical head-to-head, battle of the bands scenario. But with axes." The multiplayer modes are team-based and play in the same manner as the single-player Stage Battles, with team sizes from one-versus-one to four-versus-four. Each team selects from one of three factions which affect what resources and troops they can summon, and are tasked with defending their stage from attack by the other team. The three factions available are Ironheade, mostly human-based troops visually inspired by classic heavy metal led by Eddie Riggs; The Drowning Doom, with more goth/black metal–inspired undead led by Drowned Ophelia; and The Tainted Coil, with industrial metal–inspired and BDSM/religion-themed evil demons controlled by Doviculus. Each player controls a single main avatar who has the same abilities as in the main game for combat and magic spells and can also fly about the map, but also is in control of troops that they may summon from the team's shared resources—fans as generated by fan geysers across the map. Different types of troops are available, costing various numbers of fans to summon, with the potential to upgrade to improved units through different routes. The number and types of troops that can be summoned is limited by a cap to prevent either team from becoming too overpowered. All of the troops can be engaged by the player to initiate various "Double Team" moves as with the single player game. The game can also be played by a single player with computer-controlled opponents at one of five difficulty levels.

== Synopsis ==
=== Characters ===
Brütal Legend follows the story of Eddie Riggs (voiced by Jack Black), who is "the world's best roadie" for "the world's worst 'heavy metal' band", Kabbage Boy. Much of the game takes place in an unnamed world inspired by heavy metal music, created by, according to the game's mythology, Ormagöden, The Eternal Firebeast, Cremator of the Sky, and Destroyer of the Ancient World. In this alternate world, the human race is enslaved by a race of demons, led by Doviculus, Emperor of the Tainted Coil (voiced by Tim Curry). Doviculus is assisted by his glam metal human minion, General Lionwhyte (voiced by Rob Halford and based on David Bowie with the name being an allusion to glam metal band White Lion) whose hair is so big "and luscious" that he uses it to fly, flapping it like a pair of broad wings. Leading the fight against Doviculus are a small band of human resistance fighters with whom Eddie joins forces: Lars Halford (voiced by Zach Hanks), his sister Lita (voiced by Kath Soucie), and Ophelia (voiced by Jennifer Hale), whom Eddie takes a romantic interest in. Their group is later joined by the stage manager and tour bus driver Mangus (voiced by Alex Fernandez), the bass-playing healer Kill Master (voiced by and patterned after Lemmy Kilmister), the motorcycle-riding Fire Baron (also voiced by Halford, as well as visually inspired by him too), and the leader of the Zaulia amazons, Rima (voiced by Lita Ford and based on Kiss characters). Also supporting Eddie is the Guardian of Metal (voiced by Ozzy Osbourne, who also lent his appearance to the character) that assists in upgrading his equipment.

=== Plot ===
During a gig for Kabbage Boy, Eddie is crushed by falling scenery while trying to save a member of the band; his blood lands on his belt buckle, in reality an amulet for Ormagöden. The stage is transformed into Ormagöden, who kills the band and takes the unconscious Eddie to the heavy metal world. Awaking in the Temple of Ormagöden, Eddie meets with Ophelia while fighting Doviculus' forces, and is instantly attracted to her. They discover writings left by the Titans that Eddie is able to comprehend, and build a hot-rod, the "Deuce", that they use to escape the Temple (confronting a giant lamprey-like monster) and travel to Bladehenge, the base for the small human resistance force led by Lars and Lita. When they meet Eddie and learn he can understand the Titans' messages, they see him as a prophetical "Chosen One", though a 'dispute about the translation' leaves them unsure if he will be the savior or destroyer of the world. Ophelia also becomes concerned when Eddie, in the heat of battle, transforms into a winged creature, an effect Eddie decides to use to his advantage at the time.

Eddie helps Lars, Lita, and Ophelia create an army, named "Ironheade" to fight against General Lionwhyte. They successfully raid Lionwhyte's "Pleasure Tower" and defeat him. However, as they celebrate, Doviculus arrives, sending the group into hiding. Doviculus is aware of the presence of his spy "Succoria" by the smell of her blood as it was at the Temple; Eddie and his allies come to believe Ophelia is Doviculus' spy. Lars leaves his hiding spot to face Doviculus, but is quickly killed. As the Tainted Coil destroy the tower, Ironheade escapes into the nearby mountains; Eddie is forced to leave with Lita leaving Ophelia behind despite their shared love. Heartbroken, Ophelia is drawn toward the Sea of Black Tears, cursed waters that grant humans supernatural abilities at the cost of humanity. After leaping into the black waters, the Sea creates Drowned Ophelia, a dark doppelganger of Ophelia, who raises an army of other Black Tear-corrupted humans, the goth "Drowning Doom". After three months, she leads an attack on Ironheade's mountain camp. Though Ironheade defeats the assault, Eddie determines they must destroy the Sea to end her threat. As they travel through exotic lands and find more allies out of the pyromanical Fire Barons and the amazonian Zaulia tribe, they come across evidence of Eddie's father, the hero known as Riggnarok in this time. It tells that Riggnarok traveled to the future to attempt to learn the secrets of the Titans to bring back to the past in the humans' ongoing fight against the demons, but never returned.

With their new allies, Ironheade manages to push the Drowning Doom back towards the Sea of Black Tears; defeated, Ophelia denies Eddie's belief that she is Doviculus' spy, again claiming that Eddie's the traitor. As they argue, Doviculus arrives and confirms that Succoria is not Ophelia, but Eddie's mother. In the past, Succoria, an even more vicious demon empress, also sought the Titans' secrets in the future. However, after discovering that humans eventually become the dominant species, Succoria fell into a deep despair. Riggnarok, who had followed Succoria through time to assassinate her, took pity on her in her misery, and the two fell in love and bore Eddie. Now in the past, Eddie's demon nature has borne out, and has also inadvertently revealed the Titans' secrets to Doviculus as well. Having no more use for Ophelia, Doviculus rips out her heart, taking her powers alongside his own and causing Ophelia to dissipate. While Ironheade battles Doviculus' forces headed by a massive monster made from the Sea, Eddie engages Doviculus in a one-on-one confrontation, which ends with the demon emperor's decapitation. As Eddie escapes the Sea, he recovers Ophelia's heart from Doviculus, containing his mother's necklace he gave her when they first met, and then proceeds to rescue the real Ophelia from the ocean floor. Ashore, they rekindle their love as Ironheade celebrates their victory over Doviculus and the Tainted Coil. Back at Bladehenge, a statue to Lars is erected, while Lita continues to lead the troops against the remaining demons. Eddie insists on maintaining his "roadie" presence, staying behind the scenes and making others look good. After he promises he is not leaving to his assembled friends, Eddie takes off to complete a few errands, with Ophelia watching as he drives off into the sunset, shedding a single black tear.

== Development ==
"But I thought, if we were to make a fantasy game it would be cool to out-fantasy the fantasy games and go even farther. And what would be the name of something like that? And that's where the name Brütal Legend came from, because it just sounded like the hardest core fantasy thing out there."

— Tim Schafer

Creator Tim Schafer has said that he has been a heavy metal music fan since high school, and roadies have long fascinated him. As Schafer said in 2007, "The name was one of the very first things I thought of, over fifteen years ago. I was riding a bus, thinking about a game that would be the complete opposite of what we were working on, The Secret of Monkey Island [a Lucasfilm Games title released in 1990]. And Brütal Legend leapt into my head. I've been hanging on to that name ever since." The title, which he describes as sounding "like the hardest core fantasy thing out there", makes use of the metal umlaut. The idea behind the game first came to Schafer about fifteen years prior to its release, but its core concepts did not completely come together until after the completion of Psychonauts (2005); when he presented his idea for the game to the team, they became excited at the concept and decided to make that their next title.

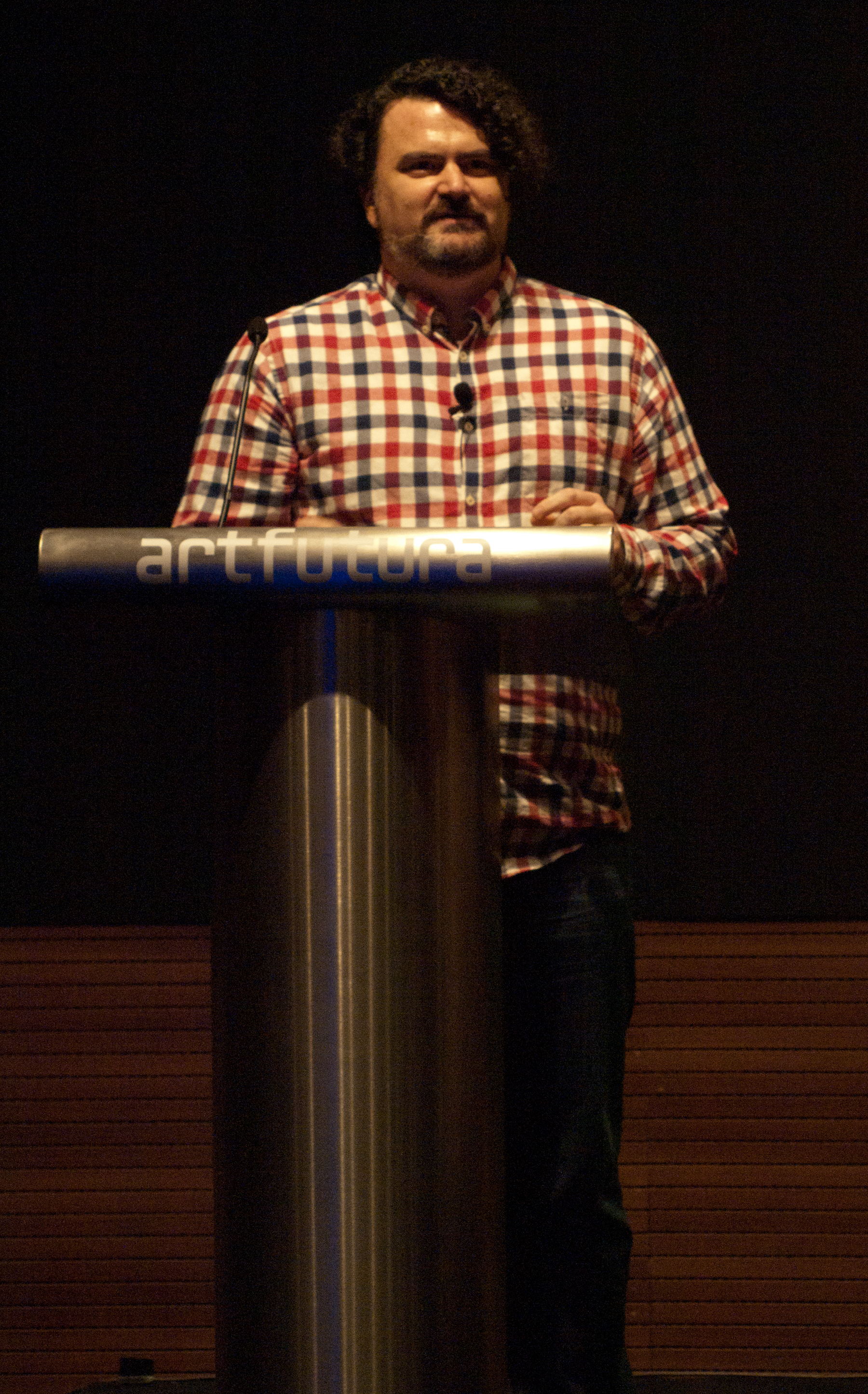
Brütal Legend was based on the creative inspiration of Tim Schafer, founder of Double Fine studios.

Part of the game's inspiration came from the fantasy worlds that the lyrics and album covers of metal bands implied but rarely made it to music videos, thus allowing Brütal Legend to "fulfill the promise" of such lore. Schafer also credits a Megadeth roadie named Tony he once met as having given him the idea to make a game about a roadie, with the character of Eddie Riggs becoming a re-imagined version of him. Schafer had previously explored the idea of a roadie sent back in time with the character of Hoagie from Day of the Tentacle, but Brütal Legend represented an opportunity to expand on it further. The 2003 movie School of Rock also reminded Schafer of his idea for Brütal Legend, and made him more excited to publish it. Double Fine's philosophy on game development was also another reason for Brütal Legend's creation, as Schafer has stated that his team attempts to make each game radically different from the company's previous release, contrasting Brütal Legend to Psychonauts. Schafer stated that the commercial tie-ins of Brütal Legend, such as "hot babes and Jack Black", is due to this philosophy and not due to market pressures. Schafer was not concerned about the commercial success of Brütal Legend, as despite poor sales of Psychonauts, "as long as you make a cool game, publishers want to talk to you". When Schafer was pitching the game before 2006, he received feedback about changing the game's style to hip hop or country. He credits Harmonix Music Systems for influencing the rhythm game market through the release of the widely successful Guitar Hero with a soundtrack that heavily emphasized metal music; with the popularity of Guitar Hero, the metal approach in Brütal Legend was readily accepted.

Schafer has pointed out that there are music term inspired attacks, such as a "Face-Melting" guitar solo, which literally will melt the foe's faces off. The metal/motorcyclist lifestyles and Norse mythology also inspired the game's open-world environments, such as amps carved into the face of a mountain, a forest where tires replace leaves, giant axes and swords piercing the ground, spandex covered temples, and mining facilities where human slaves excavated car and motorcycle parts. However, Schafer noted that they attempted to make sure that non-metal fans would be able to get the jokes as well.

=== Art design ===
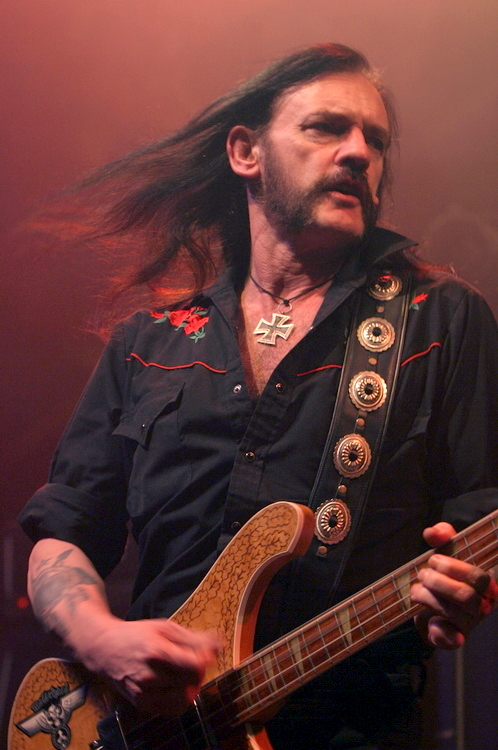
The original character design for Eddie Riggs (top) was strongly modeled after Motörhead's Lemmy Kilmister (bottom). Signature elements of Eddie's vest, crew pass, and cigarette remained part of the character redesign.

The art style for the game was based on the work of Frank Frazetta and inspired by heavy metal and rock album covers. The team only considered the addition of elements to the artwork if they felt it would be something that could be seen on such covers. The setting includes hot rod–like engines that grow from the earth like a "V8 Truffle of Speed", with designs inspired by those of Ed "Big Daddy" Roth. The art team wanted to avoid creating "another brown-gray game", and strove to use the wide color palettes that are associated with heavy metal art. Cutscenes in the game use the game's engine, though some pre-recorded scenes from the engine have also been prepared with the help of Tasha Harris, a former Pixar employee who helped to animate character's faces during cutscenes.

The game features over 80 unique characters in addition to the main protagonist, Eddie Riggs. Initial designs for Riggs was modeled after Lemmy Kilmister, and though the model was changed, the signature vest, tour pass and cigarette of the character remained part of the character design. As the character continued to develop, they began to add more aspects of Black's character, an "enthusiastic fan" of music, from School of Rock. Ultimately, Riggs's design came to become half Jack Black and half Glenn Danzig. The art team was able to use videos of Black's performances to add additional features to the character, such as "all his crazy eyebrow stuff he does". General Lionwhyte, who has "fabulous hair", and his minions are based on the glam metal fad of the 1980s which displaced heavy metal to the disappointment of Schafer and other development team members, and became the opponents of the game. To help create a more mature game with concepts that could be used to pitch the game, the art team created several factions that represented different parts of the heavy metal experience. Each faction had their own "exaggerated, simplified shapes and strong silhouettes" as to help distinguish each faction while also reducing the development costs. Inspirations for such factions include Nordic imagery, goth metal, and the artwork of Hieronymus Bosch. Additional characters include headbangers, "gravediggers", and "battle nuns". As the game features over two hours of spoken dialog, the art team wants to make the characters' faces and performances stand out, creating "clean, easy-to-read faces". The team had to change from their initial cartoony textures into more detailed ones that stood out on high-definition displays while exaggerating other features of the characters.

The user interface and menus were created by Joe Kowalski, who had previously worked on similar game elements for Guitar Hero, Guitar Hero II, and the Rock Band series. Much of the game's interface elements used a medieval woodcut art style, and were designed to contrast well against the world's graphics. The introductory menu is presented as an interactive movie created from live action clips of Jack Black manipulating a prop gatefold vinyl record album, using Adobe After Effects to provide the on-screen text, controls handling, and stitching of separate scenes into a seamless movie.

=== Characters and voice acting ===
Brütal Legend includes over 35,000 lines of spoken dialog, mostly written by Schafer. In addition to Black, Lemmy, Judas Priest's Rob Halford, the Runaways' Lita Ford, and Ozzy Osbourne provide character voices for these lines.

Schafer's original vision for the game had not anticipated a celebrity cast. In particular, though Eddie came to resemble Black, the team had not planned on having Jack Black voice the character. After learning that Black was a fan of Schafer's previous game, Psychonauts, they met with the actor/musician and recognized he was an avid gamer and metal fan and understood all the choices the team made in the game, and subsequently signed on for the voice work. Black also performed live-action sequences as himself used for the in-game menu screens and additional promotional material. Once Black had signed up for the project, Schafer found that other artists and people involved in the heavy metal scene became very interested in participating through a domino effect and word of mouth, allowing Schafer to sign them on as voice talent or as part of the game's soundtrack.

Lemmy was brought on board to play The Kill Master after Schafer and his team had developed the character's role in the story who assists Eddie by healing his allies through a giant bass harp on the back of a chopper. The original character, a man with a top hat and beard, was considered out of place by Schafer, leading him to consider famous bass guitar players and quickly recognizing the need to have Lemmy play that role. Halford plays two characters, General Lionwhyte and The Baron. Schafer had selected Lionwhyte to capture Halford's ability to scream, and found his abilities in the studio beyond what they expected. They created The Baron character specifically for Halford, as while Lionwhyte was considered a "heavy metal Stewie [from Family Guy]", that character was the complete opposite of Halford, while The Baron captures both Halford and Judas Priest's attitude. Lita Ford voices Rima, queen of a group of "Amazon-like jungle women"; Schafer considered the similarities between the lack of clothing that Rima was designed with and Ford's outfits from the 1980s, staying true to the development teams' memories of her. Osbourne plays The Guardian of Metal who helps the player upgrade their equipment; Schafer commented that both the character and Osbourne, while dark and brooding, are "really upbeat" and "optimistic".

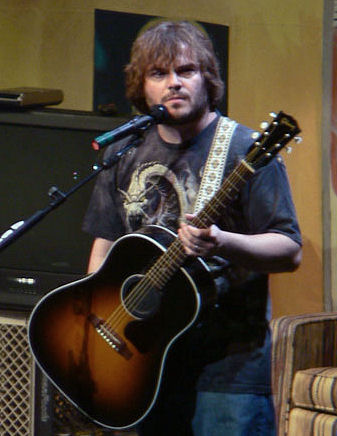
Eddie Riggs's character is partly modeled after Jack Black, who provides the voice for Eddie.

Though Ronnie James Dio of the band Dio had performed parts for the game, his role was replaced with voice work from Tim Curry. While the change was speculated to be due to tense issues between Osbourne and Dio, Schafer noted that as Dio's intended character, "Doviculus, Emperor of the Tainted Coil", grew, they found that Curry fit the role better for the part, citing Curry's role of the Lord of Darkness in the film Legend as a key factor; Schafer would also later state that Dio's part was cut due to a combination of "really complicated reasons" and other circumstances outside their control. Curry considered the role "perfect" for him when Schafer described Doviculus to him as "big and tough, but also has this kinky side who, when hit with an ax, might scream in pain or squeal with delight".

Similar to their experience with bringing Black onto the project, obtaining the voicework of the metal artists were also unexpected but beneficial. This led to some confusion during voice recording sessions; both Lita Ford and Rob Halford had difficulties with lines involving a character named "Lita Halford". Furthermore, both Black and Osbourne frequently injected profanity into their scripted lines during recording sessions. Instead of rerecording these, the development left these in the game, but included the option for a profanity content filter to be enabled by the player to "bleep" out these words and mask such word on screen using the Parents Music Resource Center "Parental Advisory" label, an icon that Schafer considered to be part of the history of heavy metal. A similar filter exists for gore in the game, preventing any dismemberment and disabling blood in the game. Schafer stated the filters were added to the game in consideration of older players that may not wish to see such aspects, or for parents who opt to play the game with younger children. During development, Schafer stated that while he could not confirm what other musicians and bands would be in the game, there would be more than already stated, and that these musicians were "especially conducive to character creation" due to the amount of theatrics used in their concert shows.

Kyle Gass, Black's collaborator with Tenacious D, voices and lends his facial likeness to a neurotic cannon operator in the game. Comedians David Cross, Steve Agee, Brian Posehn, and actor Wil Wheaton have also provided voice work for the game; Posehn had previously worked with Schafer on their high school newspaper. David Sobolov was also confirmed as a voice actor for other roles in the game; Sobolov noted that he recorded his lines separate from Black's despite his characters' having direct interaction with Riggs. Richard Horvitz, who voiced protagonist Raz in Schafer's previous game, Psychonauts, cameos as the lead guitarist of Kabbage Boy and as a car-lift operator that assigns Eddie certain side missions. Further voice acting work has been provided by veteran video game actors such as Zach Hanks, Kath Soucie, Dino Andrade and Jennifer Hale.

=== Development history ===
According to Schafer, Brütal Legend had been in development since 2007, prior to the completion of Psychonauts. Schafer noted that in Psychonauts, they attempted to bring together a lot of assets, including characters and environments, but were not able to successfully integrate them on their first attempt and had to start over on the development of some. In several cases for Psychonauts, changes made in gameplay required them to return and redesign levels to account for the new features. The company decided at the start to use the scrum development approach for Brütal Legend, which they found worked well with their company's culture, allowing them to quickly arrive at playable targets at every milestone. For example, the team was able to bring about their terrain engine, renderer, and a playable Eddie Riggs within a month of development, and by the third month, the ability for Eddie to drive about the terrain, running over hordes of enemies.

Schafer stated that they began the development with the character of Eddie, and recognizing what he should be doing in the game—specifically, swinging around his axe, playing his guitar, and driving his hot rod. Once they found this combination of elements to work well in combat and general gameplay, they were able to expand out the rest of the game from there, as these elements provided a means of testing the game to make sure it remained enjoyable. The first major feature developed for the game was the multiplayer element, given that no previous game from Double Fine had included this feature, and was the highest risk element to the game. The multiplayer gameplay itself was inspired by older strategy games, in particular, 1989's Herzog Zwei; in this game, the player controlled a transforming aircraft mecha that would normally fly about the field to issue orders for constructing new units, airlifting units to other areas, and directing combat, but the player could opt to transform the craft into a giant robot and engage directly in combat. For Brütal Legend, Schafer kept the same concept of a split-mode RTS, but wanted more focus on the ground combat; instead of spending 90% of the time controlling units as in Zwei, the player would only spend about 30% in this fashion within Brütal Legend. This subsequently led to much of the action and combat-driven gameplay outside of the stage battles. In a 2015 interview, Schafer said that much of the gameplay outside of stage battles were to provide tutorials for the Stage Battles, and to make the game more of an action-adventure than an RTS to avoid the stigma that impacts sales of RTS games. This caused the production to expand considerably around the merger of Vivendi-Activision, and Double Fine had difficulties convincing the new publishers to fund the expanded game.

The team used Unreal Engine 2.5 to build and test prototypes of the real-time strategy elements, allowing the designers and gameplay programmers to commence work while another team focused on creating a new game engine. Having completed the multiplayer stage battle portion of the game first, Double Fine found it easy to gradually introduce the player to its more advanced aspects during the single-player campaign. The game-world's large size and varied content necessitated a game engine with streaming capabilities, allowing the game to seamlessly load and unload content as needed — this was also something the team had no prior experience with. Double Fine developed several in-house tools to help streamline the content-creation process for the game's world: an automated testing bot, RoBert (so named after one of the test engineers), was created to put daily builds of the game through continuous and rigorous testing, automatically reporting any errors to developers, while the Multi-User-Editor allowed the game's artists to simultaneously work on the game-world without fear of overwriting each other's work. The team ran into content management issues late in the game's development as more of the game's assets neared completion. Within the span of a few months the combined asset size tripled, endangering the game's ability to fit on a DVD and causing performance problems throughout the company's development systems. With the help of the engineering team, they were eventually able to overcome the performance issues and re-optimize the content for space.

With the popularity of the Guitar Hero and Rock Band franchises, many wondered if Brütal Legend would take advantage of these games' guitar-themed controllers. Schafer mentioned that while he had entertained the idea, he could not find an acceptable way for players to repeatedly switch between standard and guitar controllers, so he abandoned it. Players who preordered the game through GameStop were able to unlock a special promotional in-game guitar designed in conjunction with Jack Black's band Tenacious D, and includes voices provided by both Black and Kyle Gass.

While Brütal Legend's fate was unclear, Schafer was not able to talk about the project to avoid causing problems with any potential business deals, until EA Partners picked up the game in December 2008. However, even when the fate of the publication of the game was unsure, the team continued to work on its development. Schafer reflected that the time spent during development without a publisher was beneficial, allowing them to design the game without pressure from the publisher's goals. EA CEO John Riccitiello, when asked about EA picking up Brütal Legend for distribution prior to December 2008, commented that "Sometimes significant creative risks end up being some of the world’s best products".

=== Other platforms ===
When rumors of a possible Wii port arose in March 2009, Schafer stated that "We are making an Xbox 360 and a PS3 version of Brütal Legend." However, according to Ben Fritz at Variety, another studio has been engaged by Electronic Arts to bring the game to the Wii, albeit at a later date than the other console versions, suggesting that it may follow the same model as Dead Space: Extraction, a Wii title scheduled to be released about a year after Dead Space's first release. However, further industry rumors, which claimed that the Wii version was being done by Electronic Arts in-house, have stated that the effort to port the game to the Wii has been canceled due to quality and technical concerns.

Initially after its release, Double Fine had not planned on a PC version of the game, as Schafer has stated that the game is primarily an action game and "meant to be on a console". However, in February 2013, Double Fine announced that a Windows version of the game will be released on February 26, 2013. The Windows port has been updated for higher resolutions of modern computers, and includes both DLC packs released for consoles. The multiplayer aspects of the PC version include a number of tweaks that Double Fine had tracked that they wanted to have made to the console version but could not do; while the full list of changes are not expected to be present in the initial PC release, Schafer has stated that if sales of the PC version are successful, they will look at adding new units, factions, and gameplay modes that they had originally scoped out for the console version. Mac and Linux ports were released in May 2013, premiering as part of the Humble Double Fine Bundle.

=== Sequel ===
Double Fine believed they were given the go-ahead to develop a sequel to Brütal Legend after the game's release, and had invested a great deal of development time towards this, but were later told by EA that it was cancelled. Schafer stated that the sequel would likely incorporate much of what they had to drop prior to the game's release. This game world would have been three times larger than what Brütal Legend contained. The sequel would have likely included a fourth faction that was cut from the original game which would have been the last major group the player would have to fight through, including a major boss character, before the final battles with Doviculus. Schafer further noted that at the end of the original game, Doviculus's head falls into the Sea of Black Tears, and implied that the same effect that the Sea had on Ophelia could happen to Doviculus. Schafer also had ideas for a plot using a character voiced by Ronnie James Dio, but will not likely be used due to Dio's death.

The cancellation of the sequel nearly ruined Double Fine, as they had invested all current efforts toward the title. Instead of a sequel, Double Fine began work on four smaller projects, Costume Quest, Stacking, Iron Brigade (formerly titled Trenched) and Sesame Street: Once Upon a Monster, based on prototypes they had created from "Amnesia Fortnights" during the development period where they had lacked a publisher. In these two-weeks sessions, the Double Fine team was split into four groups and each tasked with creating a small prototype game to share with the rest of the company; all four mini-games were well received internally. Upon hearing of the cancellation of the sequel, Schafer and his team began to promote these games around, and were able to obtain publishing deals for all four titles. The games will be able to take advantage of the custom game world engine and other assets they had created for Brütal Legend. The titles were considered financial successes, allowing Double Fine to recover and pursue further game development though steering away from major AAA releases.

As of 2013, Schafer is still interested in a sequel to Brütal Legend, but would require appropriate funding and resources to make it happen as an independent developer. Since then, Double Fine launched a successful crowd-funded drive for Psychonauts 2 in December 2015; Schafer said that if that game does well, there is a good chance that a sequel to Brütal Legend would be possible. Tim Schafer said June 13 during an appearance at E3 2017 that Brütal Legend will eventually get a sequel.

Double Fine had been acquired by Microsoft in 2019, but later returned to being an independent studio in 2026. To promote ideas for their next games, Double Fine ran a Kickstarter for Amnesia Fortnight 2026 in September 2026, where backers could vote for which game prototypes the studio should expand. One of the stretch goals was humorously set at $100 million to assure development of a sequel to Brutal Legend. While IGN said this was likely an impossible goal, the inclusion may tease towards existing work on the sequel.

=== Publishing issues ===
Brütal Legend was originally to be published by Vivendi Games' subsidiary Sierra Entertainment. In 2008, Activision merged with Vivendi's game division (which included Blizzard Entertainment) to become Activision Blizzard, gaining the rights to publication of Brütal Legend. Upon evaluation of their assets, Activision Blizzard chose to drop Brütal Legend along with several other games, leaving the project in limbo. Activision CEO Bobby Kotick later claimed the reason for dropping the project was due to: the project running late; missing milestones; overspending the budget and not looking like a good game. Double Fine themselves were unaware that Activision had chosen to drop the game, having been informed through an Activision press release that omitted the game from their upcoming release schedule, according to studio producer Caroline Esmurdoc. Industry rumors suggested that Electronic Arts was interested in publishing the property, and it was confirmed in December 2008 that Electronic Arts would publish the game. During the period when Brütal Legend's fate was unclear, Schafer was not able to talk about the project to avoid causing problems with any potential business deals.

In February 2009, Activision Blizzard had asserted that the Electronic Arts deal was invalid, believing that they were still in negotiations with Double Fine to publish the game. It was believed that Activision was seeking monetary compensation in a similar manner as it received from Atari for Ghostbusters: The Video Game and The Chronicles of Riddick: Assault on Dark Athena, games that were dropped when Activision Blizzard re-evaluated their assets. On June 4, 2009, Activision filed suit to prevent publishing of the game, claiming that they had invested $15 million in the title and still had a valid contract to release the game. Activision's suit also contends that Double Fine had missed a deadline for the game last year, requesting more time and an additional $7 million in development fees. Activision's considers both the loss of the money they spent on the game as well as potential sales and Brütal Legend-related merchandise as part of the harm done in the lawsuit.

In July 2009, Double Fine issued a countersuit against Activision, citing that the latter company had abandoned the project before, and was trying to harm Brütal Legend during its critical marketing phase, as well as trying to protect its Guitar Hero franchise. The countersuit stated that Activision had dropped the game after its merger with Vivendi and a failed attempt to convert the game into a Guitar Hero sequel. In response, Schafer said "Hey, if Activision liked it, then they should have put a ring on it. Oh great, now Beyoncé is going to sue me too."

In late July, the presiding judge, Los Angeles Superior Court Judge Craig Karlan, reported that a preliminary ruling that could have affected the game's release would have been given on August 6, 2009, with Karlan tentatively ready to deny Activision's motion to delay the game. However, prior to the ruling, the companies announced they had reached an out-of-court settlement on the lawsuits, though details were not available.

Though most of the developers involved in the game were shielded from the effects of the lawsuit, Double Fine's Caroline Esmurdoc noted that it took a significant toll on Schafer and the other lead executives at the company. Activision's lawsuit had been filed at the time the game had reached the alpha release state, and would need to be concluded prior to the game's final release; this required the executives to dedicate their time towards information gathering, interviewing, and other legal matters "during the crunchiest, most critical time of development". As such, while they ultimately were able to settle the legal matter, Esmurdoc believed that the impact of the effort in settling the lawsuit impacted the quality of the final product. Schafer wrote more than 50% of the game's dialog in the few months following the completion of the lawsuit and prior to release, a "big crunch" for him.

=== Downloadable content ===
Schafer, prior to the game's release, stated that Double Fine had "something awesome" planned for downloadable content to further support the game after release. Two downloadable packs have since been released. The first, "Tears of the Hextadon", was released in early November 2009, containing two new multiplayer maps and a new single-player weapon. The pack was initially free on the PlayStation Network for the first two weeks of release. The second pack, "The Hammer of Infinite Fate", was released in mid-December 2009, and in addition to new multiplayer maps, expands the single-player experience by incorporating new weaponry for the Deuce, outfits for Eddie, a GPS system to track collectibles in the game's world, and other additional content, including figureheads of Razputin, the lead character from Psychonauts, and Schafer himself.

== Marketing ==
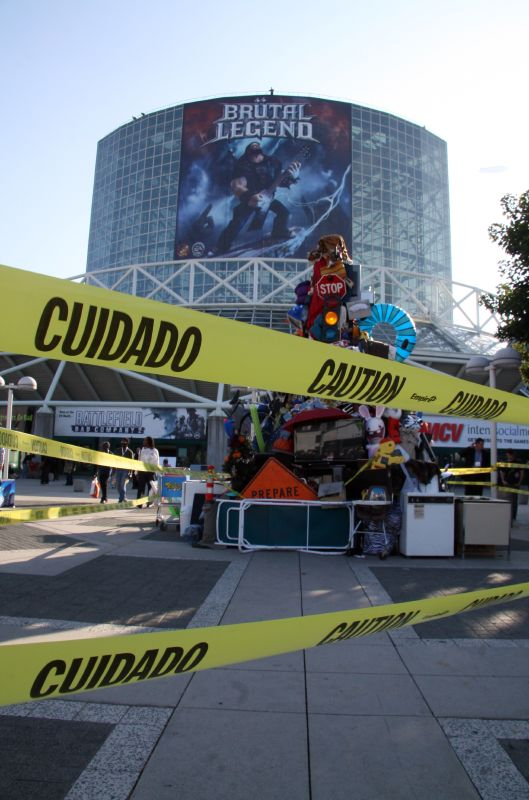
Brütal Legend was given significant exposure at 2009's E3 through a large banner on the South Hall of the Los Angeles Convention Center.

Brütal Legend was announced in October 2007 through a feature article in Game Informer; gaming journalists had received a vinyl record from Activision that contained a backwards message alluding to the game's story. The game's release in October 2009 was promoted as "Rocktober" in official literature about the game from Electronic Arts. At the 2009 Download Festival in Donington Park in England, Electronic Arts arranged for 440 fans of Brütal Legend to help to break the Guinness World Record for the largest number of air guitar players, all simultaneously playing to "Ace of Spades" by Motörhead. A series of short online videos featuring Black (and Schafer in two instances), entitled "Brutal Thoughts with Jack Black", have been used to promote the game since May 2009. At the 2009 Video Music Awards, Black appeared in cosplay as Eddie to promote the game.

A promotional concert for the game was held at the 2009 Comic-Con International Convention in July 2009, and featured the metal artists Gwar, 3 Inches of Blood, Unholy Pink, and Keith Morris. It has also been announced that Brutal Legend was the official sponsor of the 2009 Mastodon/Dethklok tour. Schafer appeared on Late Night with Jimmy Fallon on October 2, 2009, to promote the game. Black appeared on Jimmy Kimmel Live! on October 14, 2009, dressed as Eddie Riggs and staying in character during his interview.

A demo version of the game was made available on the Xbox Marketplace and PlayStation Store; it was available for a limited time on September 17, 2009, for North American users who had pre-ordered the product through GameStop. The demo became available to all Xbox Live Gold users on September 24, 2009, and to Xbox Live Silver users and all PlayStation 3 users the following week. The demo is based on the game's beginning, showing Eddie's arrival and his encounters up until the first boss character fight.

After Ozzy Osbourne's death on July 22, 2025, Double Fine made the PC and macOS versions of the game available to claim and download for free from itch.io for 666 minutes as a tribute towards Osbourne. Double Fine repeated the offer on August 26, 2026, after Tim Curry's death.

== Soundtrack ==
Brütal Legend features 107 heavy metal tracks from 75 different bands, selected by Schafer and Music Director Emily Ridgway, each song being a "completely sincere choice" by Schafer and Ridgway, with the whole track list being "designed to be loved by Metal fans." Schafer sought to include songs from most main subgenres of metal, including classic heavy metal, industrial metal, black metal, and doom metal, with each faction in the game favoring a specific type. Though Schafer and others on the Double Fine team had vast knowledge of specific types of metal, Ridgway turned to a used-CD store owner named Allan from Aquarius Records who had "encyclopedic knowledge" of the entire genre, and who provided the team with sample CDs to help them discover some of the more obscure metal bands. Schafer had identified many of the more well-known songs on the list, while Ridgway was able to locate mission-appropriate, more obscure titles for inclusion; for example, one mission, given by the Killmaster (voiced by Lemmy Kilmister), involves rescuing female troops for Ironheade's army; Ridgway had been able to locate a cover of "Bomber", originally recorded by Motörhead (Kilmister's band) and performed by the all-female metal band Girlschool, recorded in their 1981 split EP St. Valentine's Day Massacre. Schafer also credits Black with some of the music selections for the game. Instead of relying on labels or bands to provide them with a list of possible songs to select from, the development team sought permission to use specific songs they wanted in the game. In some cases, obtaining appropriate licensing proved difficult, as for songs from bands that had long split up, Double Fine needed to contact each band member to gain permission. This proved to be valuable, as some original bands were excited about their music being used in the game; in one case, Lita Ford was able to provide the game with a song with slight modifications to the lyrics from a version that she was about to release. One song is from the in-game band "Kabbage Boy" for which Eddie is a roadie at the start of the game.

Schafer had tried to get music from groups like Metallica and AC/DC, but their licensing fees were too high. He further tried to work with Iron Maiden, but the group was hesitant to participate after recognizing that the character name "Eddie Riggs" suggested an attachment with the band's mascot, named "Eddie" and designed by Derek Riggs; the band's marketing group pointed out that this could imply that Iron Maiden had endorsed the game.

In addition to licensed music, the game includes over 70 minutes of original score by Tim Schafer's long-term collaborator Peter McConnell. McConnell composed pieces for orchestra and Metal band to tie in with the licensed music in the game. Also, the in-game soundtrack contains an instrumental drum track played by Slough Feg drummer Harry Cantwell, all other "real" drums (6 tracks) were played by Y&T drummer Mike Vanderhule and recorded by Jory Prum. The solos triggered by the player during the game were composed and recorded by Judas Priest guitarists Glenn Tipton (Eddie's solos) and K. K. Downing (Ophelia's and Doviculus's solos). While Schafer would like to have a soundtrack album for the game, he stated that there were already difficulties in securing the licenses for songs within the game and was not sure if it would be possible to extend them to a soundtrack. Schafer helped to select three songs—"We Are the Road Crew" by Motörhead, "The Metal" by Tenacious D, and "More Than Meets the Eye" by Testament—to appear in a pack of Rock Band downloadable songs that was made available the same day as Brütal Legend's release.

The full soundtrack remained intact for Brütal Legend's addition to the Xbox One backwards compatibility catalog in September 2018; Double Fine had assured all music licensing rights had remained in place for this release.

Song	Artist
"A Serpentine Crave"	Bishop of Hexen
"Ad Noctis"	Rotting Christ
"Am I Evil?"	Diamond Head
"Angel Witch"	Angel Witch
"Angels Don't Kill"	Children of Bodom
"Assault Attack"	Michael Schenker Group
"Back at the Funny Farm"	Motörhead
"Battle Angels"	Sanctuary
"Battle Hymn/One Shot at Glory"	Judas Priest
"Believer"	Ozzy Osbourne
"Betrayal"	Lita Ford
"Birth of the Hero"	Tvangeste
"Blackout"	Scorpions
"Blitzkrieg"	Deathstars
"Bomber"	Girlschool
"Breadfan"	Budgie
"Cathode Ray Sunshine"	Dark Tranquillity
"Children of the Grave"	Black Sabbath
"Crack the Skye (Instrumental)"	Mastodon
"Cremation"	King Diamond
"Cry of the Banshee"	Brocas Helm
"Dawn of Battle"	Manowar
"Deadly Sinners"	3 Inches of Blood
"Destroy the Orcs"	3 Inches of Blood
"Diary of a Madman"	Ozzy Osbourne
"Die for Metal"	Manowar
"Dr. Feelgood"	Mötley Crüe
"Drink the Blood of the Priest"	Brocas Helm
"Fast as a Shark"	Accept
"For the Glory Of..."^{a}	Testament
"Free Your Hate"	KMFDM
"Frost"	Enslaved
"Girlfriend"	Kabbage Boy
"God of Thunder"	Kiss
"Goliaths Disarm Their Davids"	In Flames
"Hall of the Mountain King"	Savatage
"Her Ghost in the Fog"	Cradle of Filth
"High Speed Dirt"	Megadeth
"Holiday"	Scorpions
"Igniisis Dance"	Wrath of Killenstein
"In the Black"	Motörhead
"Insomnia"	Dark Fortress
"Kickstart My Heart"	Mötley Crüe
"Lay It Down"	Ratt
"Leather Rebel"	Judas Priest
"Live Wire"	Mötley Crüe
"Loke"	Enslaved
"Love Dump"	Static-X
"Machine Gunn Eddie"	Nitro
"March of the Crabs"	Anvil
"Marching Off to War"	Motörhead
"Master Exploder"	Tenacious D
"Murmaider"	Dethklok
"Metal Church"	Metal Church
"Metal Storm/Face the Slayer"	Slayer
"Metal Thrashing Mad"	Anthrax
"More Than Meets the Eye"	Testament
"Mr. Crowley"	Ozzy Osbourne
"Mr. Scary"	Dokken
"Narita"	Riot
"Never Say Die"	Black Sabbath
"Nightstalker"	Cloven Hoof
"No Love Lost"	Carcass
"Oblivion (Instrumental)"	Mastodon
"Overnight Sensation"	FireHouse
"Painkiller"	Judas Priest
"Progenies of the Great Apocalypse"	Dimmu Borgir
"Pure Evil"	Iced Earth
"Queen of Desire"	Ostrogoth
"Queen of the Masquerade"	Crimson Glory
"Riding the Storm"	Running Wild
"Rip the System"	KMFDM
"Road Racin"	Riot
"Rock Bottom"	UFO
"Rock of Ages"	Def Leppard
"Skeleton on Your Shoulder"	Coroner
"Snap Your Fingers, Snap Your Neck"	Prong
"So Frail"	Mirrorthrone
"Soul Thrashing Black Sorcery"	Skeletonwitch
"Stigmata"	Ministry
"Still of the Night"	Whitesnake
"Sulphur Injection"	Apostasy
"Superbeast"	Rob Zombie
"Swords and Tequila"	Riot
"Symptom of the Universe"	Black Sabbath
"Tag Team"	Anvil
"Technical Difficulties"	Racer X
"The Axeman"	Omen
"The Beautiful People"	Marilyn Manson
"The Hellion/Electric Eye"	Judas Priest
"The Metal"	Tenacious D
"The Somber Grounds of Truth"	Bishop of Hexen
"The Wild and the Young"	Quiet Riot
"Thieves"	Ministry
"Through the Fire and Flames"	DragonForce
"Thus Spake the Nightspirit"	Emperor
"Tornado of Souls"	Megadeth
"Warriors Dawn"	Slough Feg
"(We Are) the Road Crew"	Motörhead
"Welcome Home"	King Diamond
"Wheels of Steel"	Saxon
"When the Night Falls"	Iced Earth
"Witches"	Candlemass
"World of Hurt"	Overkill
"Y.R.O."	Racer X
"Youth Gone Wild"	Skid Row
"Zoom Club"	Budgie

^aThe track is merged with the song "More Than Meets the Eye".

== Reception ==
Reception

Aggregate score
Aggregator	Score
Metacritic	PS3: 83/100; X360: 82/100; PC: 80/100

Review scores
Publication	Score
1Up.com	B+
Computer and Video Games	7.9/10
Eurogamer	8/10
Game Informer	8.0/10
GameSpot	8.5/10
GameSpy	4.5/5
Giant Bomb	3/5
IGN	9.0/10
X-Play	4/5

Brütal Legend received positive response from gaming journalists, with reviewers praising the story and characters of the game, and driven vocal performances of the voice actors, particularly Black and Osbourne. Daemon Hatfield of IGN felt Black was "completely committed" to the role of Riggs, while Giant Bomb's Ryan Davis found it relieving that Black reined in his typical "loud-talking heavy-metal goofball" act that he is known for and instead performed well, "bringing just the right amount of working-man's matter-of-fact-ness to the role". Osbourne's role was considered "amazing (and surprisingly coherent)" by GameSpot's Giancarlo Varanini and "played brilliantly" by Computer and Video Games's Andrew Kelly. The full cast was commended for their roles; the heavy metal musicians were effective at playing themselves in the game, while the other voice talent performed well and "[did] their part to balance out the star power" in the game. The strength of the characters was considered to be enhanced by the quality of writing of the story, and the use of facial animation. Eurogamer's Christian Donlan considered the characters of Brütal Legend to be the strongest aspect to the game, distancing the title from other video games due to "rounded, personable leads who are distinctly superior to the usual throngs of cybermen and super-vixens", and a facet of Schafer's signature work. Wired's Chris Kohler further attested the strength of the game's story to Schafer's skill, considering that "After Brütal Legend, he should be considered one of the best storytellers in gaming, period." 1UP.com's Justin Haywald noted that the game lacks the ability to review cutscenes, forcing the player to restart the story if they wanted to see these again.

The heavy metal-inspired world of Brütal Legend was also well received, and considered to show a clear reverence for the genre. Gerald Villoria of GameSpy considered the game to be "dedicated to an unabashed love of metal" and "heavy metal fan-service to the highest degree". Davis believed that the juxtaposition of all the elements that made up the heavy metal fantasy world were the game's greatest strength, often being "both giddily ridiculous and fist-pumpingly badass" at the same time. Critics found that while the graphics for the game may not be the most sophisticated for the current console generation, the detailed art aspects of the world were impressive; Varanini considered that "no matter where you are in the world, there's always some cool object to look at", while Donlan considered the world to be a "constant unfolding delight". The incorporation of heavy metal music into the game also benefited the game. Both Kelly and Villoria considered the soundtrack essential to the game, and praised the moments where specific songs, such as Dragonforce's "Through the Fire and Flames" would be used as background music during specific game sequences. Kelly further praised the game for using the songs to define the action of the game instead of relegated to random background music. Villoria also considered the soundtrack to have "enormous breadth of sound and diversity", introducing the player to heavy metal genres they may not have known even existed. G4TV's Jake Gaskill considered listening to the soundtrack to be the equivalent of "taking a class in heavy metal appreciation."

The actual gameplay was seen as Brütal Legend's largest weakness. Many reviewers were critical of the incorporation of real-time strategy (RTS) elements into the game, a fact that was not well advertised prior to the game's release and does not become apparent to the player in the first hours of the game. Though Schafer had set out to make the console-based game like an RTS from the start, they were warned by both Vivendi and Electronic Arts that "RTS" was "a naughty word in the console space", and instead marketed it as an action game. Despite this, reviewers found that the game was still difficult to play on a console due to the selected controls that made it difficult to target objectives or troops, the lack of a mini-map to track friends and foes, and the frantic pace of battle.

Critics did appreciate the slow introduction to the various aspects of the game as part of the single player game, but felt the game did not adequately introduce or explain all of the game's RTS features, such as the ability to mount a final stand on one's stage. Some also considered the single-player campaign Stage Battles to be too easy, winnable by brute force, and that more advanced tactics would only become apparent as one played in multiplayer games, including learning the abilities and advantages of the other units of the factions other than Ironheade. The mix of gaming genres between the RTS and third-person action was found particularly confusing; Kohler commented that the handling of the individual genres was accomplished well, leading to "an astoundingly complex design instead of a simple one" that diminished the enjoyment of the game, while Davis considered that "perhaps there wasn't enough confidence in any one piece to let it carry the whole game". However, some felt that the various genres helped to create "a variety of gameplay opportunities", and made for "rather elegant" Stage Battles. In retrospect, Schafer lamented that they did not include enough tutorials in the game to guide the player as to "naturally how to play the strategy part a bit better", as they had come to accept over the years of development, and tried to use the Double Fine blog to explain some of these aspects. Though some critics argued that stripping out the RTS elements and leaving an action combat game wrapped in the metal-themed world would have been a better game, Schafer countered that this would have not been true to the vision that he had from the start. Schafer would later jokingly refer to the RTS elements of Brütal Legend; during the fundraising for Broken Age, Schafer teasingly threatened to add RTS elements to the point-and-click if the funding had reached certain levels.

Gameplay outside of the Stage Battles was also met with mixed impressions. Most considered the side missions highly repetitive, which included mission types that are generally disliked by gamers, such as escort missions. The lack of a mini-map, replaced by either following a glowing light from the sky illuminating the player's target or by navigating based on the Deuce's turn signals, was criticized for making it difficult to explore the game's world. The information about the world that players can access in the game's pause menu was also found to be lacking, neither showing the collectible elements of the game on the main map, nor easily identifying the alliance of the various troops in the in-game guidebook. Though Eddie gains the ability to fly during Stage Battles, the inability to use this or to make the character jump led to reviewers getting the character stuck on the landscape at times when exploring. Some reviewers found the number of progress checkpoints in the game to be lacking, requiring the player to repeat a long mission if they should die before reaching one. The single-player game was also considered to be short, lasting as little as four hours if one only completed the main story missions. In 2011, readers of Guinness World Records Gamer's Edition voted Eddie Riggs as the 48th top video game character of all time.

=== Sales ===
According to the NPD Group, Brütal Legend sold approximately 215,000 copies in the United States in October 2009, with about 150,000 copies being for the Xbox 360 platform, making it the 12th-top-selling game in that month. These numbers were not considered to be strong, and were attributed to the difficult marketing of the game, which emphasized Jack Black's involvement and the heavy metal nature of the game, but did not assert what the gameplay would actually be like, with the possibility that the mention of the RTS elements of the game would have possibly driven more players away from the game. In an interview in February 2011, Schafer claimed that the game had sold over 1.4 million copies.

According to data collected through Nielsen SoundScan, some songs contained within Brütal Legend's soundtrack saw digital sales increases of up to 700% following the game's release, similar to the effects of Guitar Hero and Rock Band, though impact on overall sales of these songs was rather small.

=== Awards ===
Black was given the Best Voice award at the Spike Video Game Awards 2009. During the 13th Annual Interactive Achievement Awards, the Academy of Interactive Arts & Sciences awarded Brütal Legend with "Strategy/Simulation Game of the Year" and "Outstanding Achievement in Soundtrack"; it also received nominations for outstanding achievement in "Character Performance" (for Eddie Riggs), "Original Story", and "Game Direction".

The game was also nominated for the Game Developers Choice Awards for "Best Writing" and "Best Audio".

== See also ==
- Full Throttle, an earlier Tim Schafer game featuring bikers and heavy metal music
