= Here Waits Thy Doom =

Studio album by 3 Inches of Blood
- Released: August 31, 2009
- Recorded: 2009
- Studio: Soundhouse Recording (Seattle, Washington)
- Genre: Heavy metal, power metal
- Length: 51:29
- Label: Century Media Records
- Producer: Jack Endino

3 Inches of Blood chronology
Fire Up the Blades (2007)	Here Waits Thy Doom (2009)	Long Live Heavy Metal (2012)

Professional ratings
Review scores
Source	Rating
allmusic	3.5/5 stars

Here Waits Thy Doom is the fourth studio album from the Canadian heavy metal band 3 Inches of Blood. It is the first 3 Inches of Blood album not to feature vocalist Jamie Hooper and thus the first to feature no founding members of the band. This is also the first 3 Inches of Blood album released through Century Media. On June 29, 2009 members of the Goatriders Horde fan club were granted the first to listen to the new song "Call of the Hammer." The song was available for streaming via the band's Myspace page starting July 8, 2009. On September 9 the band released a new music video for the track "Silent Killer".

== Track listing ==
No.	Title	Lyrics	Music	Length
1.	"Battles and Brotherhood"	Cam Pipes; Justin Hagberg	Shane Clark	4:46
2.	"Rock in Hell"	Pipes	Hagberg	4:56
3.	"Silent Killer"	Pipes; Hagberg	Hagberg	4:12
4.	"Fierce Defender"	Pipes	Clark; Hagberg	5:15
5.	"Preacher's Daughter"	Pipes	Hagberg	6:47
6.	"Call of the Hammer"	Pipes	Clark; Hagberg	2:58
7.	"Snake Fighter"	Pipes; Hagberg	Hagberg	3:18
8.	"At the Foot of the Great Glacier"	Pipes	Clark	3:17
9.	"All of Them Witches"	Pipes	Clark; Hagberg	6:42
10.	"12:34"	Instrumental	Clark	1:45
11.	"Execution Tank"	Pipes	Clark	7:33
Total length:				51:28

Limited digipak edition bonus track
No.	Title	Lyrics	Music	Length
12.	"Not Fragile" (Bachman-Turner Overdrive cover)	C. Fred Turner	Turner	4:07

Limited vinyl edition bonus track
No.	Title	Lyrics	Music	Length
12.	"Cities on Flame with Rock and Roll" (Blue Öyster Cult cover)	Albert Bouchard; Donald "Buck Dharma" Roeser; Sandy Pearlman	Bouchard; Roeser; Pearlman	4:05

Deluxe edition bonus tracks
No.	Title	Lyrics	Music	Length
12.	"Wizard's Island"	Pipes	Clark; Hagberg	4:59
13.	"Not Fragile" (Bachman-Turner Overdrive cover)	Turner	Turner	4:07
14.	"Cities on Flame with Rock and Roll" (Blue Öyster Cult cover)	Bouchard; Roeser; Pearlman	Bouchard; Roeser; Pearlman	4:05
15.	"Daytona" (Zeke cover)	Blind Marky Felchtone	Felchtone	1:41

Japanese edition bonus tracks
No.	Title	Lyrics	Music	Length
12.	"Not Fragile" (Bachman-Turner Overdrive cover)	Turner	Turner	4:07
13.	"Wizard's Island"	Pipes	Clark; Hagberg	4:59

== Personnel ==
3 Inches of Blood

- Cam Pipes – clean vocals
- Justin Hagberg – harsh vocals, guitars, bass, organ & piano, gang vocals on track 5
- Shane Clark – guitars, bass, acoustic guitars, gang vocals on track 5
- Ash Pearson – drums

Additional musicians

- Masa Anzai, Dan Rheault, James Farwell, Brad McKinnon: gang vocals on track 5
