= Long Live Heavy Metal =

Studio album by 3 Inches of Blood
- Released: March 15, 2012
- Recorded: November 2011–January 2012
- Studio: Vogville Recording, Profile Sound Studios
- Genre: Heavy metal, power metal
- Length: 52:48
- Label: Century Media Records
- Producer: 3 Inches of Doom, Terry "Sho" Murray

3 Inches of Blood chronology
Here Waits Thy Doom (2009)	Long Live Heavy Metal (2012)

Professional ratings
Review scores
Source	Rating
allmusic	4/5 stars
Thrash Hits	4.5/6 stars

Long Live Heavy Metal is the fifth studio album from the Canadian heavy metal band 3 Inches of Blood. It is the second 3 Inches of Blood album to be released through Century Media and not feature Jamie Hooper on screaming vocals, and is their only release to feature the same line-up as the previous one. This would also be the band's final studio album before disbanding in 2015 and reuniting in 2023.

== Track listing ==
No.	Title	Lyrics	Music	Length
1.	"Metal Woman"	Cam Pipes; Justin Hagberg	Hagberg	4:48
2.	"My Sword Will Not Sleep"	Pipes	Shane Clark	4:37
3.	"Leather Lord"	Pipes; Hagberg	Hagberg	3:57
4.	"Chief and the Blade"	Instrumental	Clark	2:27
5.	"Dark Messenger"	Pipes	Clark	4:07
6.	"Look Out" (Ronnie James Dio tribute)	Pipes	Hagberg	5:29
7.	"4000 Torches"	Pipes	Clark	4:16
8.	"Leave It on the Ice"	Pipes	Clark; Hagberg	3:34
9.	"Die for Gold (Upon the Boiling Sea IV)"	Pipes	Clark	4:03
10.	"Storming Juno"	Pipes; Hagberg	Hagberg	4:24
11.	"Men of Fortune"	Pipes; Hagberg	Hagberg	7:35
12.	"One for the Ditch"	Instrumental	Clark; Hagberg; Ash Pearson	3:31

Limited digipak edition bonus tracks
No.	Title	Lyrics	Music	Length
13.	"Lords of Change (Note: Taken from Anthems for the Victorious EP.)"	Pipes	Clark	4:31
14.	"Strength of the Grave"	Pipes	Clark	4:35
15.	"Daytona (Note: Previously released as a bonus track on the deluxe edition of Here Waits Thy Doom.)" (Zeke cover)	Blind Marky Felchtone	Felchtone	1:41

Japanese edition bonus tracks
No.	Title	Lyrics	Music	Length
13.	"Lords of Change"	Pipes	Clark	4:31
14.	"Strength of the Grave"	Pipes	Clark	4:35
15.	"Daytona" (Zeke cover)	Felchtone	Felchtone	1:41
16.	"Cities on Flame with Rock and Roll (Note: Previously released as a bonus track on the deluxe and limited vinyl editions of Here Waits Thy Doom.)" (Blue Öyster Cult cover)	Albert Bouchard; Donald "Buck Dharma" Roeser; Sandy Pearlman	Bouchard; Roeser; Pearlman	4:05
17.	"Battles and Brotherhood" (Live at Loud Park Festival 2010)	Pipes; Hagberg	Clark	4:50

== Personnel ==
=== 3 Inches Of Blood ===
- Cam Pipes – clean vocals
- Justin Hagberg – harsh vocals, rhythm guitar, bass
- Shane Clark – lead guitar, bass
- Ash Pearson – drums

=== Additional personnel ===
- Alia O'Brien – flute on #04
- Terry "Sho" Murray – producer
- Kim Thiessen – artworks

== Notes ==
Although Byron Stroud appears on the credits as the bassist member of the band, all bass on the album was performed by Justin Hagberg & Shane Clark. Both were credited using a ficticional character, 'Shustin Hagblark', a mix of both names.
