= Production sound mixer =

Member of a film crew or television crew

A sound mixer at a sound cart - a wheeled cart with batteries, sound mixing and recording equipment and transmitters/receivers.

A production sound mixer, location sound recordist, location sound engineer, or simply sound mixer is the member of a film crew or television crew responsible for recording all sound recording on set during the filmmaking or television production using professional audio equipment, for later inclusion in the finished product, or for reference to be used by the sound designer, sound effects editors, or Foley artists (aka Foley dancers). This requires choice and deployment of microphones, choice of recording media, and audio mixing in real time.

Usually, the recordist will arrive on location with their own equipment, which normally includes microphones, radio systems, booms, mixing desk, audio storage, headphones, cables, tools, and a paper or computer sound logs. The recordist may be asked to capture a wide variety of wild sound on location, and must also consider the format of the finished product (mono, stereo or multi channels). Production sound mixers are tasked with recording audio in many different types of environments. Shoots outside require extra equipment such as microphone screens or wind blockers. Larger productions will often take advantage of a sound stage, or a large prepared environment that has been treated for acoustic control and is attended by an audio staff, directed by the mixer. The production sound mixer may travel to each potential shooting site to scout any potential audio disturbances. This is a critical preparatory step that allows the mixer to begin planning the equipment that will be needed for the shoot.

The recorded production soundtrack is later combined with other elements, i.e. effects, music, narration, Foley or re-recorded dialog by automated dialogue replacement (ADR).

Often, when taping on video, the sound recordist may record (single system) audio directly onto the camera rather than use a separate medium (double system), although a separate copy is often made, as it both provides an extra copy which may have more tracks and also may include other sound captured without the camera.

The sound mixer is considered a department head, and is thus completely responsible for all aspects of production sound including the hiring of a boom operator and utility sound technician, planning the technical setup involving sound including both sound equipment and ancillary devices involved in syncing and time offsets, anticipating and discussing sound-related problems with the rest of the crew, and ordering and preparing the sound equipment to be used on the set.
