= Boom operator (media) =

Profession for microphone pole placement

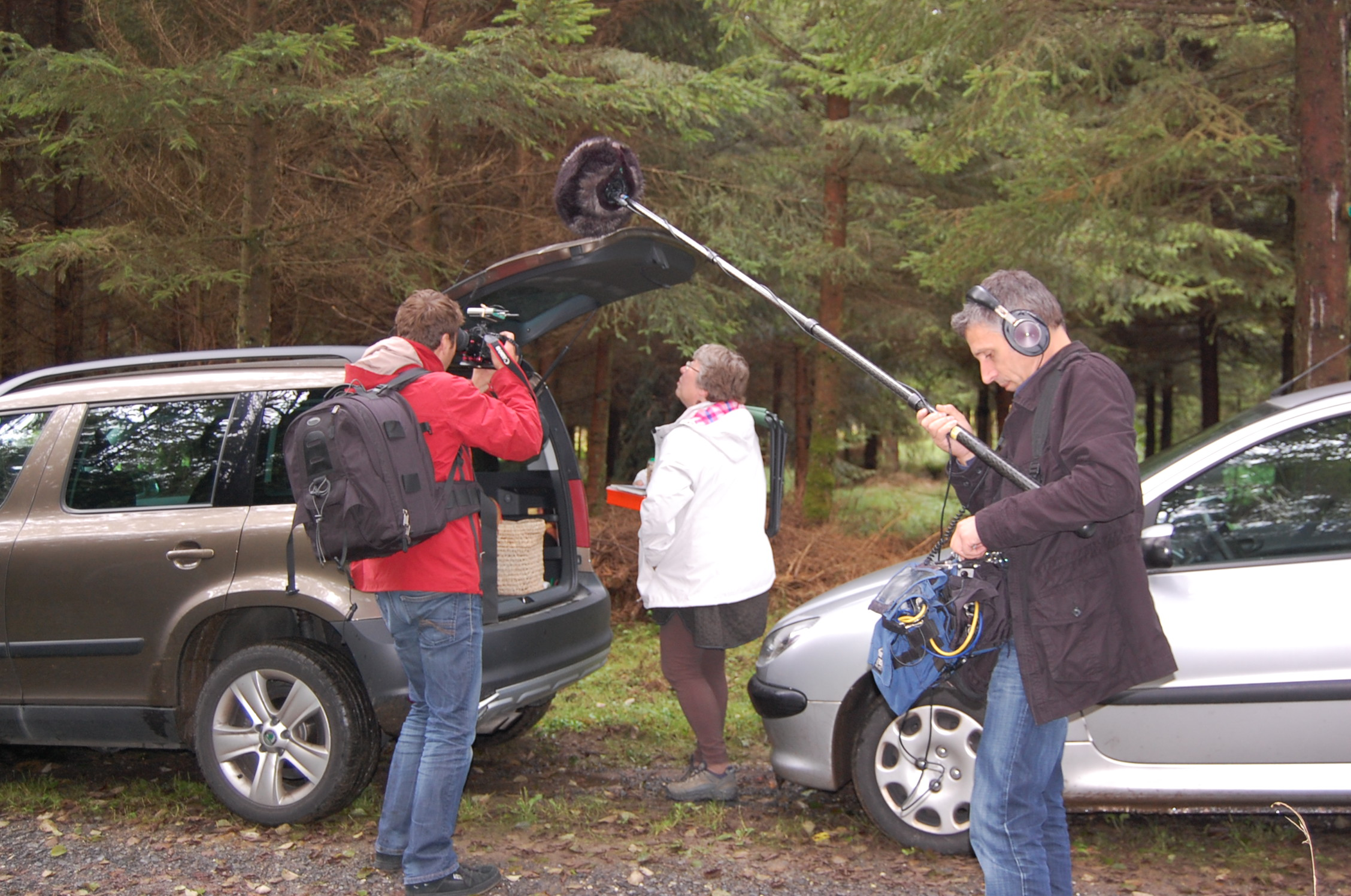
Boom operator on set.

A boom operator (or First Assistant Sound) is a core role in the sound department of a film production, who works with the production sound mixer and utility sound technician. The principal responsibility of the boom operator is microphone placement, usually using a boom pole (or "fishpole") with a microphone attached to the end (called a boom mic), their aim being to hold the microphone as close to the actors or action as possible without allowing the microphone or boom pole to enter the camera's frame.

== Invention of the boom mic ==
The first noted instance of a prototype boom mic was on The Wild Party (1929). To allow Clara Bow to move freely on the set, director Dorothy Arzner had technicians rig a microphone onto a fishing rod.

Another instance of a boom mic was on the set of Beggars of Life (1928) when director William A. Wellman wanted a tracking shot of two actors walking down a street, and the sound man refused, telling the director that the actors had to be static and the microphone had to be hidden in a flowery vase. Wellman said "that's crazy" and instructed the sound man to put the microphone on a broom-handle and walk along the actors just outside of the frame. According to David O. Selznick, "I was also present on the stage when a microphone was moved for the first time by Wellman, believe it or not. Sound was relatively new and at that time the sound engineer insisted that the microphone be steady. Wellman, who had quite a temper in those days, got very angry, took the microphone himself, hung it on a boom, gave orders to record—and moved it."

A patent was filed a year later for a very similar sound-recording device by Edmund H Hansen, a sound engineer at the Fox Film Corporation.

== Applications ==
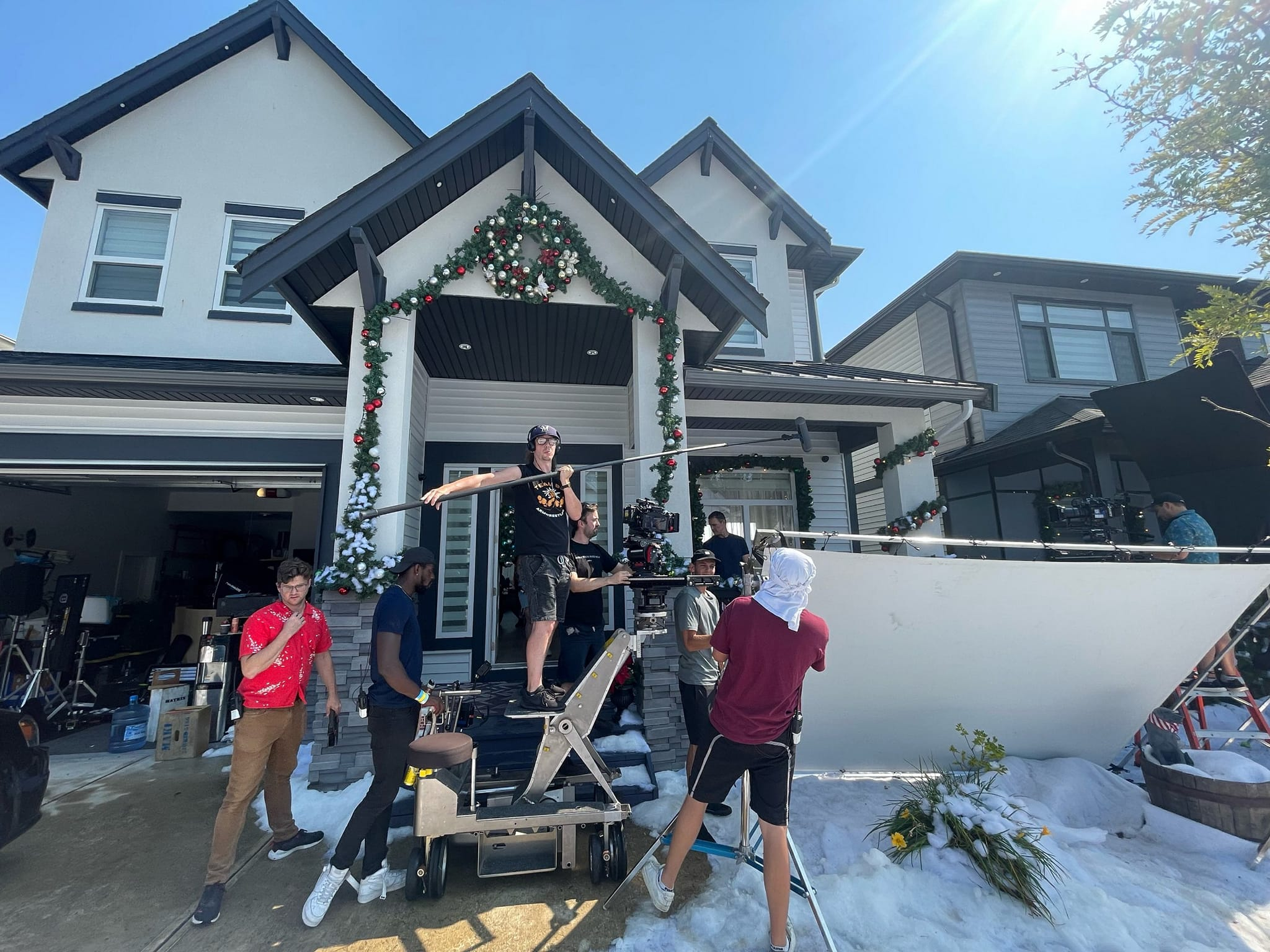
A boom operator onboard a JL Fisher camera dolly with boom pole fully extended

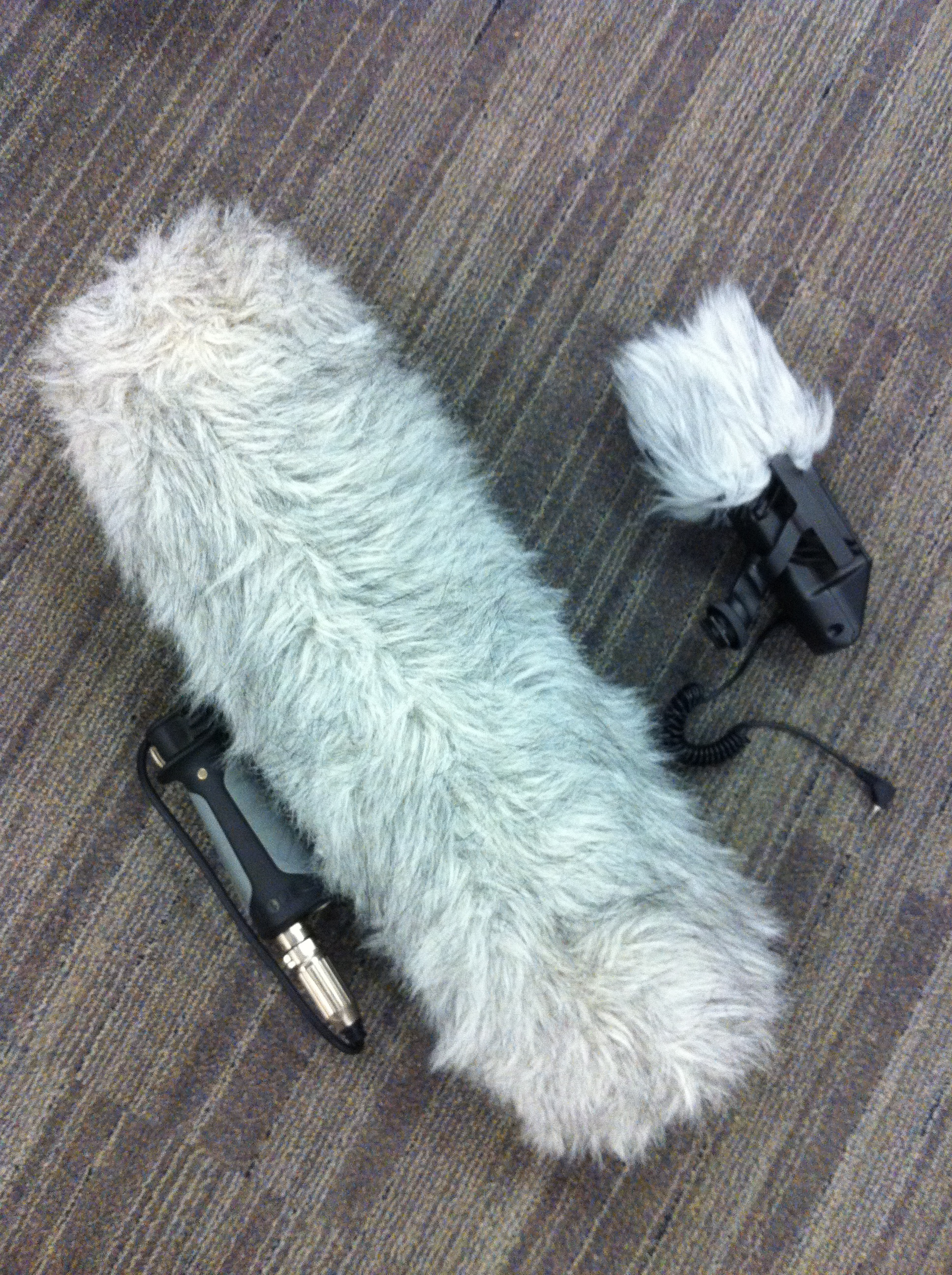
A "dead wombat" or "dead cat" (left) and "dead kitten" (right) wind-attenuating microphone covers

Often in television studios, the boom operator will use a Fisher boom, which is a more intricate and specialized piece of equipment on which the operator stands, allowing precise control of the microphone at a greater distance from the actors. They will also attach wireless microphones to persons whose voice requires recording. Boom poles are usually manufactured from several lengths of aluminum or carbon fibre tubing, allowing the boom to be extended and collapsed as the situation requires.

Some poles have a microphone cable routed through the inside of the pole, which may be a regular cable protruding at the bottom end, or a coiled cable that can extend with the pole, connecting to a socket at the base into which the operator plugs the microphone cable. The ideal boom pole is lightweight and strong, supporting the weight of the microphone on the end while adding as little weight as possible.

Frequently, a wind-attenuating cover, called a "blimp" or "mic-blimp", is used to enclose the microphone. A blimp covered with sound-absorbing fuzzy fabric is usually nicknamed a windmuff or a "dead cat". In film crew jargon, the gruesome-sounding phrase dead cat on a stick is simply a boom microphone fitted with a fuzzy wind-screen.

On feature films and TV drama boom operators will have another sound assistant working under them who will assistant in various ways; including with boom operating out of vision dialogue, applying radio microphones and rigging other pieces of equipment.

The boom operator and production sound mixer can sometimes be combined into a job performed by one person on lower budget productions, usually when the crew number is to be kept minimal, or for documentaries or news collecting. The one-man unit is often known simply as a "sound recordist" or "sound man", and would perform all on set sound duties.

The boom operator must decide where to place the microphone based on a combination of factors, including the location and projection of any dialogue, the frame position of the camera, the source of lighting (and hence shadows) and any unwanted noise sources. Often the boom operator will need to be as familiar with the script as are the actors, as they may be required to tilt or move the microphone according to who is speaking.

In productions with a bigger budget, more than one boom operator may be used, with each operator focusing on a different actor.

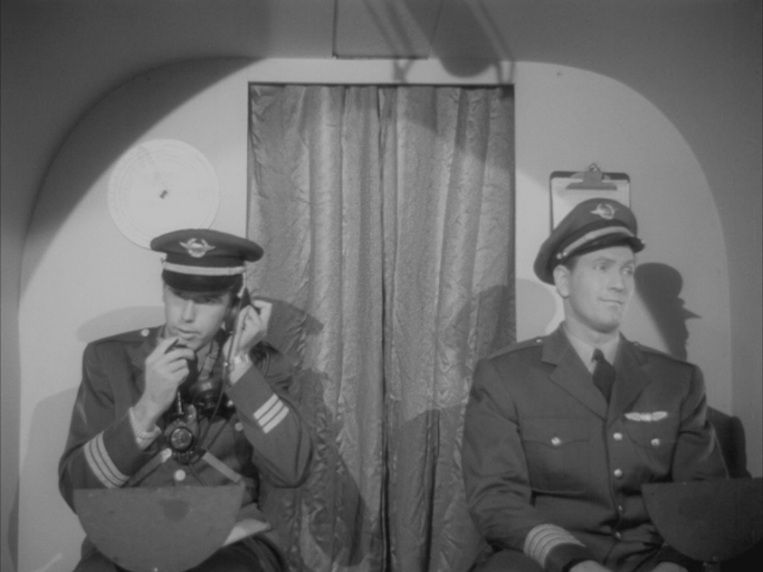
A scene in Plan 9 from Outer Space showing a visible shadow of a boom mic positioned outside the shot.

Having the boom mic or its shadow appear on the screen in a completed picture is considered a sign of poor film-making. Notable examples include the mic's shadow appearing above two crewmen flying a plane in Plan 9 from Outer Space and the mic itself dipping into the frame numerous times in Rudy Ray Moore's film Dolemite. Pastiches of bad film-making may also use boom mic visibility to spoof their material.

Boom operators therefore need to have a high level of skill to perform their jobs to a high standard. Knowledge of various types of microphones and their applications is essential. A knowledge of camera lenses is also necessary as well a good overall technical understanding of all the varied equipment modern sound departments use. Because boom operators are required to liaise with actors and multiple departments they need to be diplomatic and have good people skills. They also need a good level of physical fitness, strength and stamina.

== Gallery ==
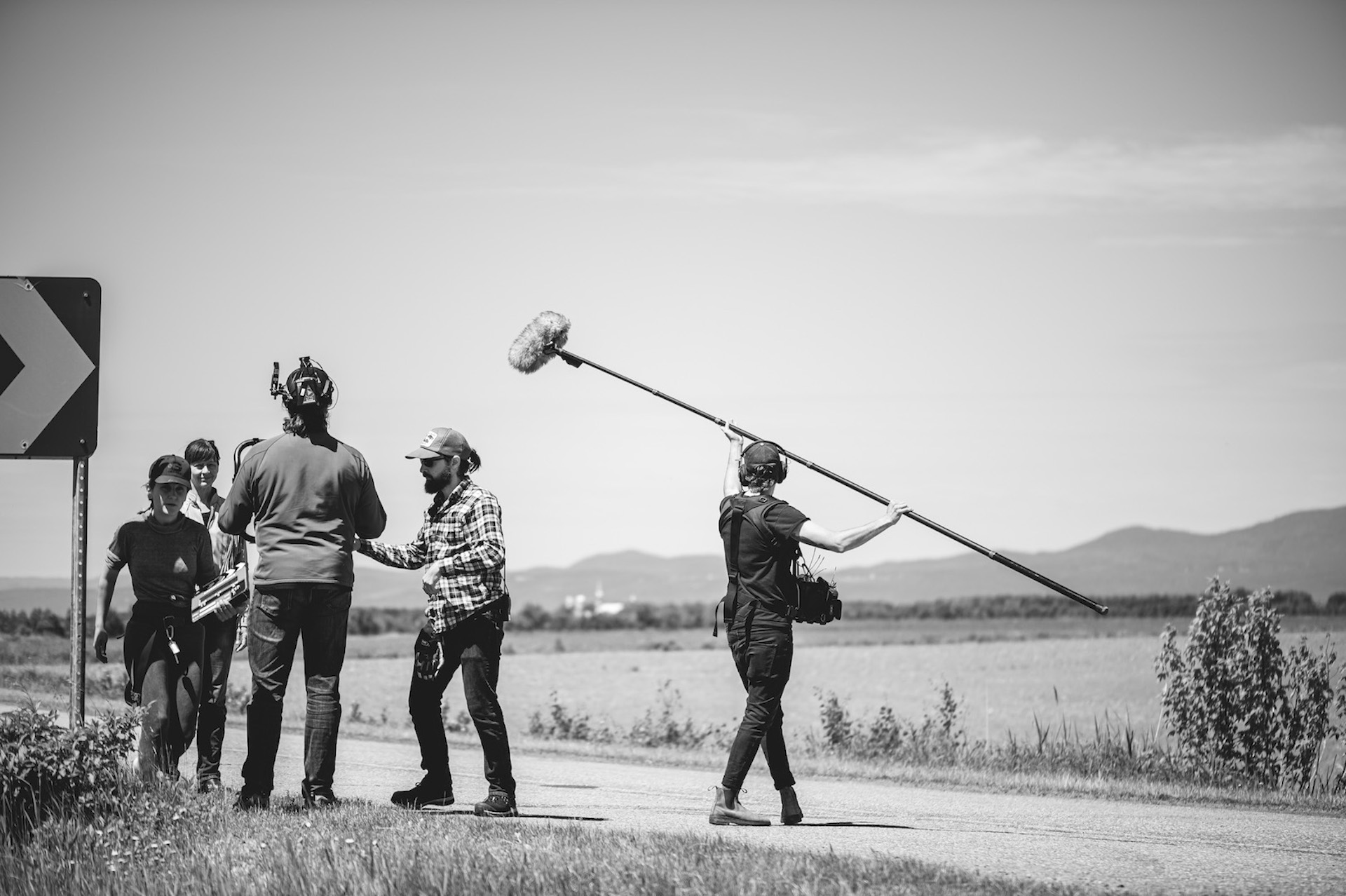
Booms can be extended for more difficult placement.

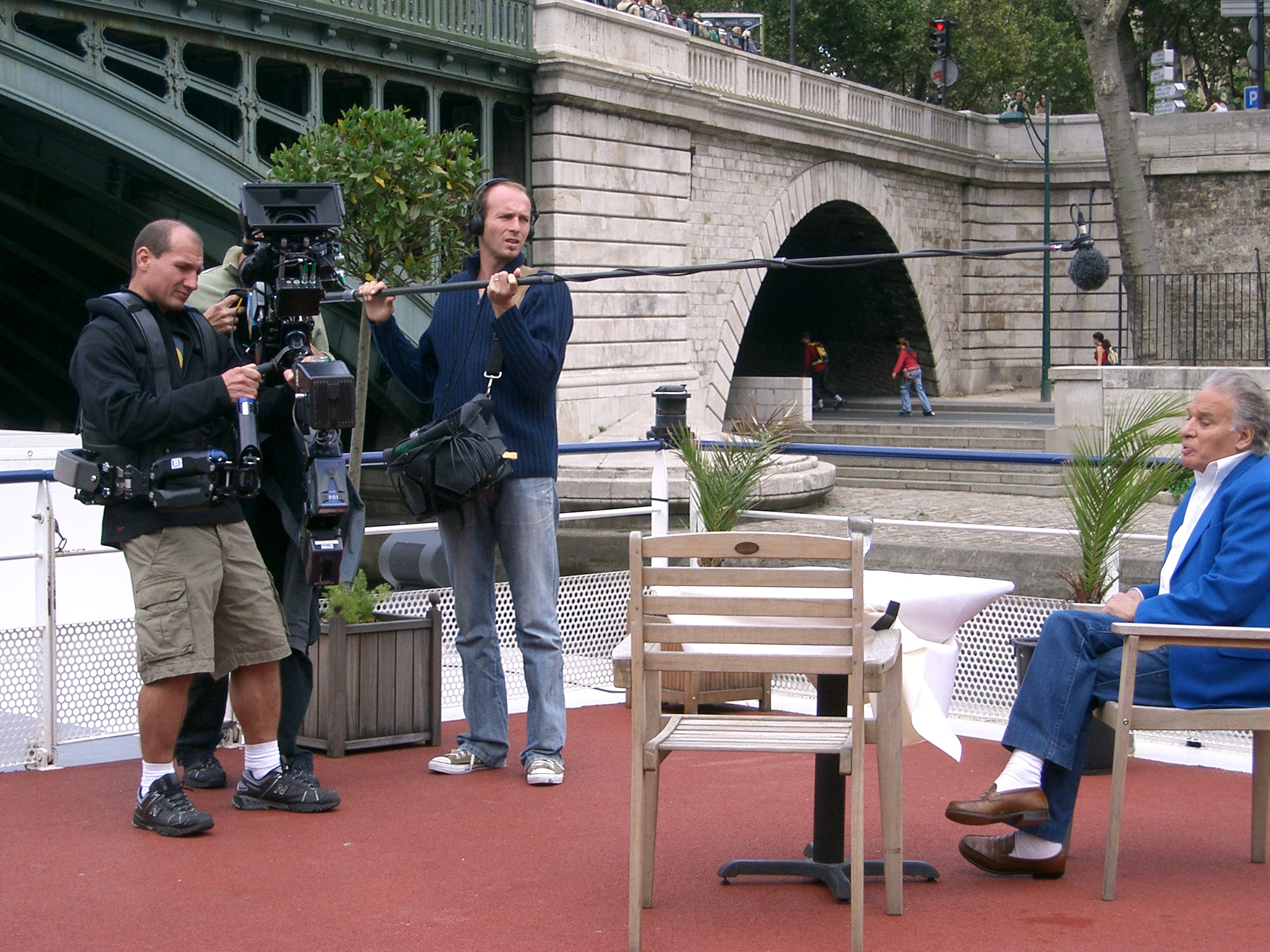
A one-man band boom operator/recordist holding a boom pole.

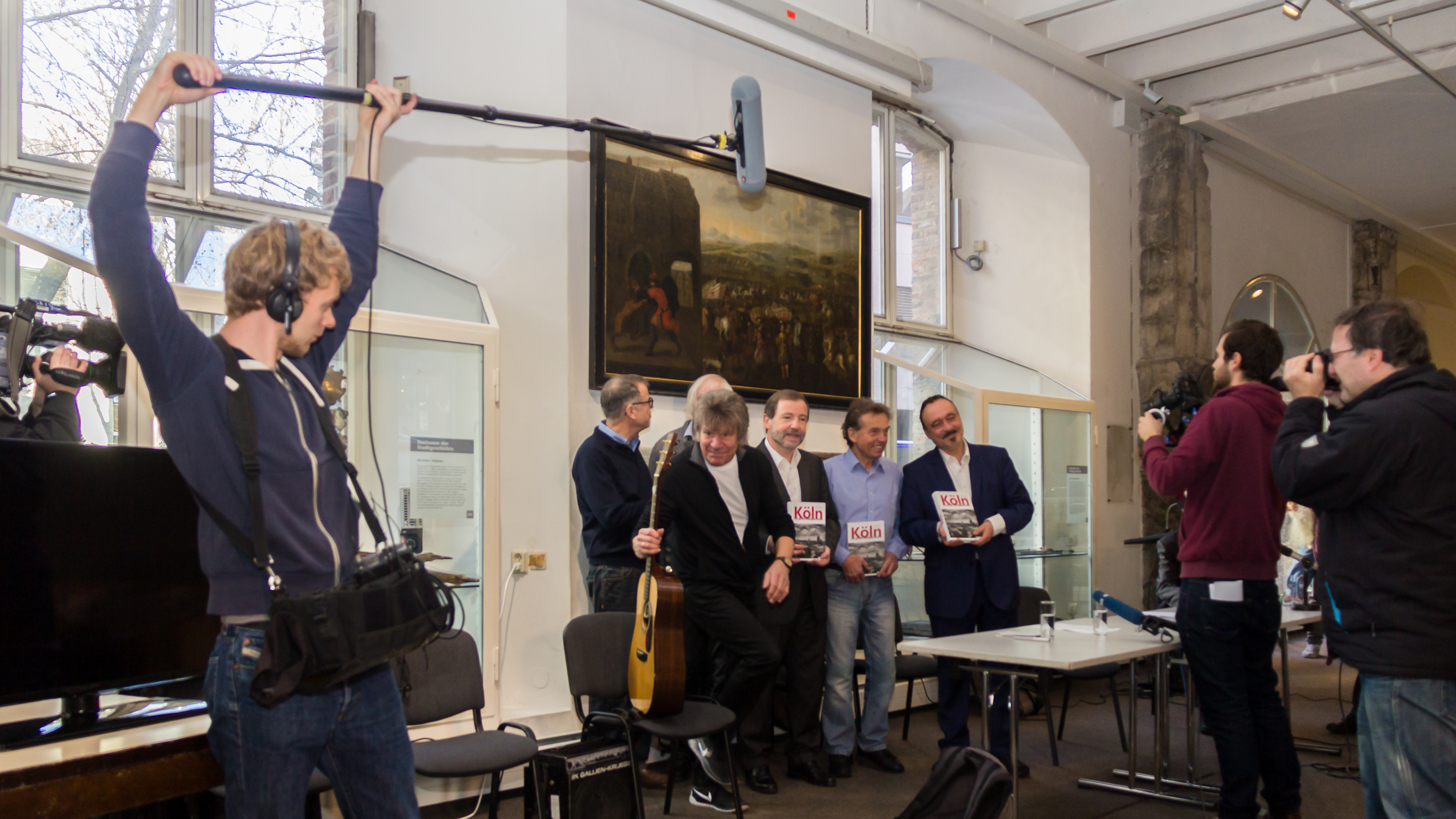
Boom operator working to keep boom out of the shot.

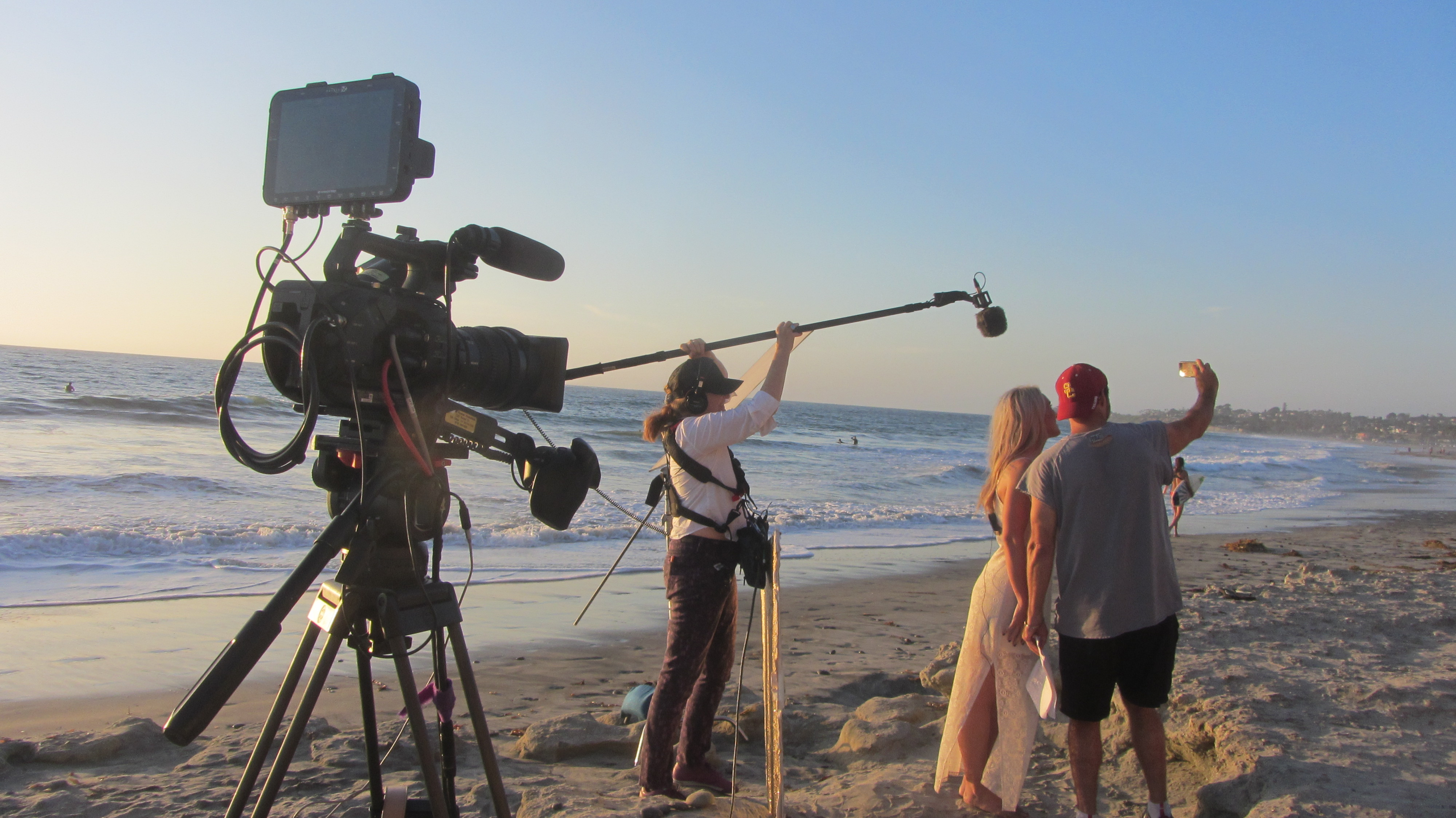
Video production at South Carlsbad State Beach, California.
