= Apostasy (band) =

Swedish black metal band

- Origin: Kramfors, Sweden
- Genre: Symphonic black metal
- Years active: 2000–present
- Label: Black Mark Production
- Members: Fredric Edin; Matthias Edin; Mikael Björklund; Pontus Lundgren; Leif Högberg; Thomas Ohlsson
- Past members: Daniel Lindgren; Andreas Edin; Håkan Börklund; Richard Holmgren; Peter Sandin; Dennis Bobzien; Lars Engström; Henrik Johansson

Apostasy is a Swedish black metal band formed in 2000, not be confused with the earlier Norwegian band of the same name.

== History ==
The original 2000 lineup consisted of Håkan Björklund and Mathias Edin of Kramfors, Sweden. They recruited Mattias' brother Fredric Edin on vocals and bass, and Lars Engström on guitar. The band was named after the demon Marchosias.

In January 2002, the band recorded Demo 2002 in Studio Underground in Västerås, Sweden. The two songs on this demo remained as demo material and are considered to be of the "Marchosias" time. One of the songs, "Demons of The Night", appeared on the compilation CD for Smack Rock Festival 2002.

Later in 2002, Andreas Edin (bass) and Dennis Bobzien (keyboards) joined the band. Engström left and Henrik Johansson replaced him. The six-piece evolved their style with keyboards. In November 2002, the band recorded a demo with three songs that would appear on their first album. In the late winter/early spring of 2003, Black Mark Records offered the band a contract. Shortly before recording their first album, Andreas Edin left the band and was replaced with Leif Högberg. The band's debut, Cell 666. was recorded summer 2003. During recording, the band renamed to Apostasy.

There were several formation changes in the years leading up to the second album release. In the fall of 2003, Håkan Björklund left, Dennis Bobzien took over on drums, Leif Högberg moved to keyboards, and the band recruited bassist Daniel Lindgren. In 2004, drummer Dennis Bobzien quit the band. Peter Sandin played drums until recording Devilution, after which Richard Holmgren took over. Lindgren also left the band to focus on Setherial, and Johan Edlund joined the band on bass.

In 2005, Apostasy released their second album, Devilution. On 9 March 2006, guitarist Henrik Johansson died after receiving a stab wound to his heart from his 19-year-old girlfriend at their Kramfors apartment. The band eventually recruited Ludvig Johansson and David Ekevärn, and with Johan Edlund leaving the band, Patrik joined in on bass.

In 2009 it was reported that the band were recording their third album, which Frederic Edin stated would be "the most brutal and most technical we have ever made".

In 2010 Thomas Ohlsson (Project Hate) took over the duty of playing drums and with Ludvig Johansson leaving to explore other styles of music, Peter Huss (Shining) joined on guitar. Later that year, Apostasy signed with record label Rambo Music of Sweden.

Their third album Nuclear Messiah was due for release on 27 April 2011, though the official release was later changed to 24 August 2011.

The song "Sulphur Injection" has appeared in the video game, Brütal Legend.

== Band lineup ==
Current

- Fredric Edin (vocals)
- Mathias Edin (guitar)
- Thomas Ohlsson (drums)
- Leif Högberg (keyboards)
- Mikael Björklund (guitar)
- Pontus Lundgren (bass)

Previous members

- Peter Huss (guitar)
- Patrik Wall (bass)
- Peter Lundholm “(bass)”
- Ludvig Johansson (guitar)
- David Ekevärn (drums)
- Daniel Lindgren (bass)
- Andreas Edin (bass)
- Håkan Börklund (drums)
- Richard Holmgren (drums)
- Peter Sandin (drums)
- Dennis Bobzien (keyboards)
- Lars Engström (guitar)
- Henrik Johansson (guitar)

== Discography ==
- Demo 2002 (Demo, 2002)
- MarchosiaS (Demo, 2002)
- Cell 666 (Black Mark Production, 2004)
- Devilution (Black Mark, 2005)
- Nuclear Messiah (2011)(7.1/10)
