= 3 Inches of Blood =

Canadian heavy metal band

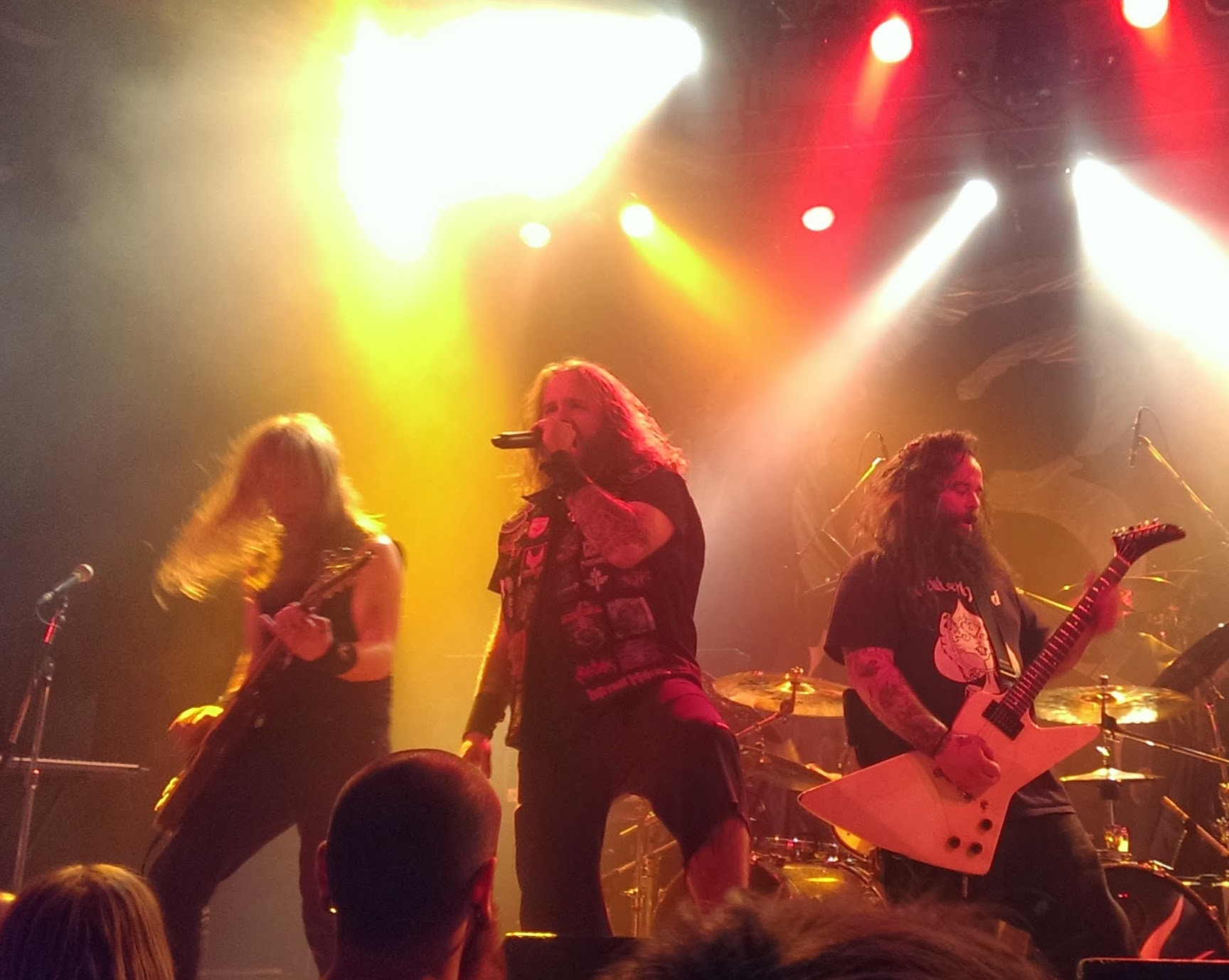
- 3 Inches of Blood in 2013

Background information
- Origin: Victoria, British Columbia, Canada
- Genres: Heavy metal; power metal
- Years active: 1999–2015; 2023–present
- Labels: Minion, Roadrunner, Century Media, Death Clock Records, Teenage Rampage Records
- Members: Cam Pipes; Shane Clark; Justin Hagberg; Ash Pearson; Nick Cates
- Past members: Jay Watts; Geoff Trawick; Rich Trawick; Bobby Froese; Sunny Dhak; Matt Wood; Brian Redman; Alexei Rodriguez; Jamie Hooper; Byron Stroud; Steve Ericson (touring); Aaron "Boon" Gustafson (touring); Matt C (touring); Pete Griffin

3 Inches of Blood is a Canadian heavy metal band formed in 1999 in Victoria, British Columbia. They disbanded in 2015 and reunited in 2023 with a line-up of Cam Pipes, Justin Hagberg, Shane Clark, Nick Cates, and Ash Pearson. Their music is influenced by the new wave of British heavy metal.

== History ==
=== Early years, and Battlecry Under a Wintersun ===
The group began when Jamie Hooper, Sunny Dhak, and Bobby Froese, along with Geoff Trawick (Drums) and Rich Trawick (Bass), played a reunion show for an old group of theirs. They wrote new material in a traditional metal style, and continued under a new name supposedly inspired by someone sustaining a minor cut. Rich Trawick's roommate, Steve Bays (keyboard player for Hot Hot Heat), heard the band's first demo and suggested Cam Pipes to overdub clean vocals. Pipes did so on what became the band's first EP, Sect of the White Worm, and joined full time.

Their debut album Battlecry Under a Wintersun was recorded in 2002 and released in cooperation with Teenage Rampage Records and the label Fashion Before Function. (It was later remastered and re-released by the band under their own label, Minion Music.) The album had moderate underground success in the Canadian market, ranking on national college radio charts and winning Metal Album of Year at the 2002 Canadian Independent Music Awards. The band garnered international exposure when its UK distribution label put them on as a support slot for a tour with rock band The Darkness. This exposure garnered critical attention and acclaim in the world of underground metal, and they were signed by Roadrunner Records in 2004.

=== Advance and Vanquish 2004–2005 ===
In 2004, Geoff Trawick and Rich Trawick left the band due to personal differences with the rest of the band and professional differences with Roadrunner Records. Matt Wood of Vancouver doom/sludge/noise band Goatsblood, and Brian Redman replaced them. Soon after, just after recording the band's second album Advance and Vanquish, Sunny Dhak and Bob Froese left the band. Wood was replaced by Alexei Rodriguez. (Dhak, Froese and Wood, with Mike Payette, then founded the band Pride Tiger.)

Dhak and Froese were replaced by Justin Hagberg, who had previously played with Pipes in Allfather, a black metal band, and Shane Clark. Roadrunner put out an advertising blitz, and the track "Deadly Sinners" from Advance and Vanquish appeared on numerous sampler CDs, compilations, and in three video games (Tony Hawk's Underground 2, Saints Row 2, and Brütal Legend). This created huge press hype for the band and Roadrunner put them on the 2005 Road Rage Tour.

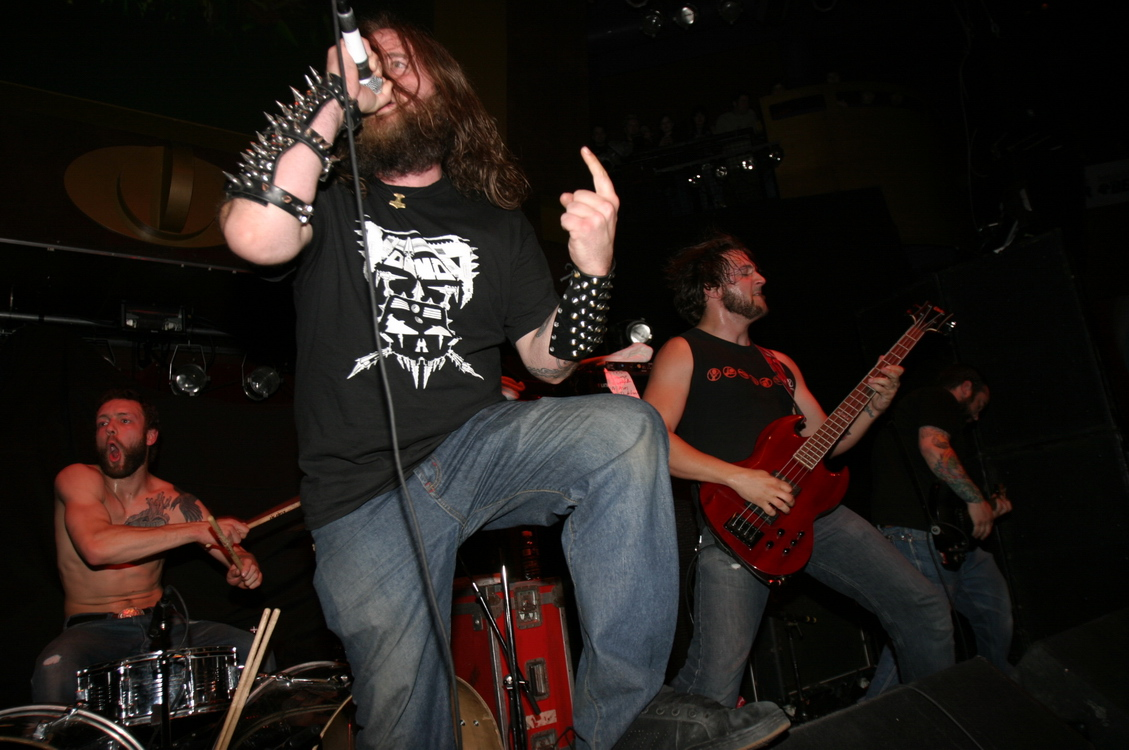
3 Inches of Blood performing in 2005

Also in 2005, Justin Hagberg recorded the guitars on the tracks "Dawn of a Golden Age" and "I Don't Wanna Be (A Superhero)" for Roadrunner United: The All Star Sessions. In October 2006, at the Verizon Wireless Amphitheatre in Irvine, California, the band opened for Iron Maiden during the United States leg of their 2006 A Matter of Life and Death World Tour.

=== Fire Up the Blades 2006–2008 ===
The band wrote their third studio album, Fire Up the Blades, in Tacoma, Washington and performed their new songs at various places in Washington. By December 2006, they were recording at Vancouver's Armoury Studios, with Joey Jordison, drummer of Slipknot as producer. A demo of "Goatrider's Horde", which was recorded in Seattle in the spring of 2006, was made available for streaming on Roadrunner's official website, and a demo of "Night Marauders" appeared in the fifth Battle Metal compilation album, The Final Conflict, released in 2007 in issue 161 of the UK magazine Metal Hammer. In 2006, Brian Redman left the band (he would pass away in 2009, at age 31); he was replaced by bassist Nick Cates.

The band toured the United States during January and February 2007 in support of Cradle of Filth with The 69 Eyes and, in March, toured the UK with Biomechanical opening for them. On March 22, 2007, the band was confirmed to play the second stage at Ozzfest.

Prior to the release of Fire Up the Blades, the band stressed that the album would be "darker, tighter and more dangerous" than their Roadrunner Records debut. "This album is heavily influenced by low quality beer, bong rips and listening to black metal in the dark", said Hooper. "It doesn't sound blatantly black metal, it still sounds like us. But it's a faster, more intense version of us."

Fire Up the Blades was released in Japan on May 28, 2007, and worldwide on June 26, 2007. It reached No. 147 on the Billboard charts in the U.S.

During the 2007 Ozzfest Tour, Jamie Hooper was unable to sing with the band as he was experiencing throat problems. He did not perform on the Ozzfest tour or the Operation Annihilation tour; he quit the band in 2008. Harsh vocal duties were taken over by Hagberg.

At the 2007 Hard Rock Hell festival in the UK, drummer Alexei Rodriguez got into a fight with Saxon drummer Nigel Glockler. The fight left Glockler with broken glasses and a black eye; the security guards who intervened put Rodriguez in hospital with a broken elbow. 3 Inches of Blood fired Rodriguez, apologized for his behaviour and replaced him with Ash Pearson (of Sound Of the Swarm & Just Cause).

=== Here Waits Thy Doom 2009–2011 ===
With Hooper gone, 3 Inches of Blood's fourth album Here Waits Thy Doom, was their first album not to feature any original members. It reached No. 195 on the US Billboard charts.

The song "Beware The Preacher's Daughter" features all four members of fellow Canadian Metal band Bison B.C. (James Farwell, Dan And, Masa Anzai and Brad MacKinnon) singing gang vocals on the chorus.

3 Inches of Blood was featured in Rockstar's Mayhem Festival 2010, and the band released a music video for the song "Silent Killer".

=== Long Live Heavy Metal ===
On March 26, 2012, the band released their final album, Long Live Heavy Metal. CAN No. 92 They toured the US and the UK and, that August, opened for Metallica in Vancouver. In 2013, they toured with Goatwhore, Death Angel, Revocation (who Pearson would subsequently join), and Battlecross, among others.

=== Breakup and reunion show ===
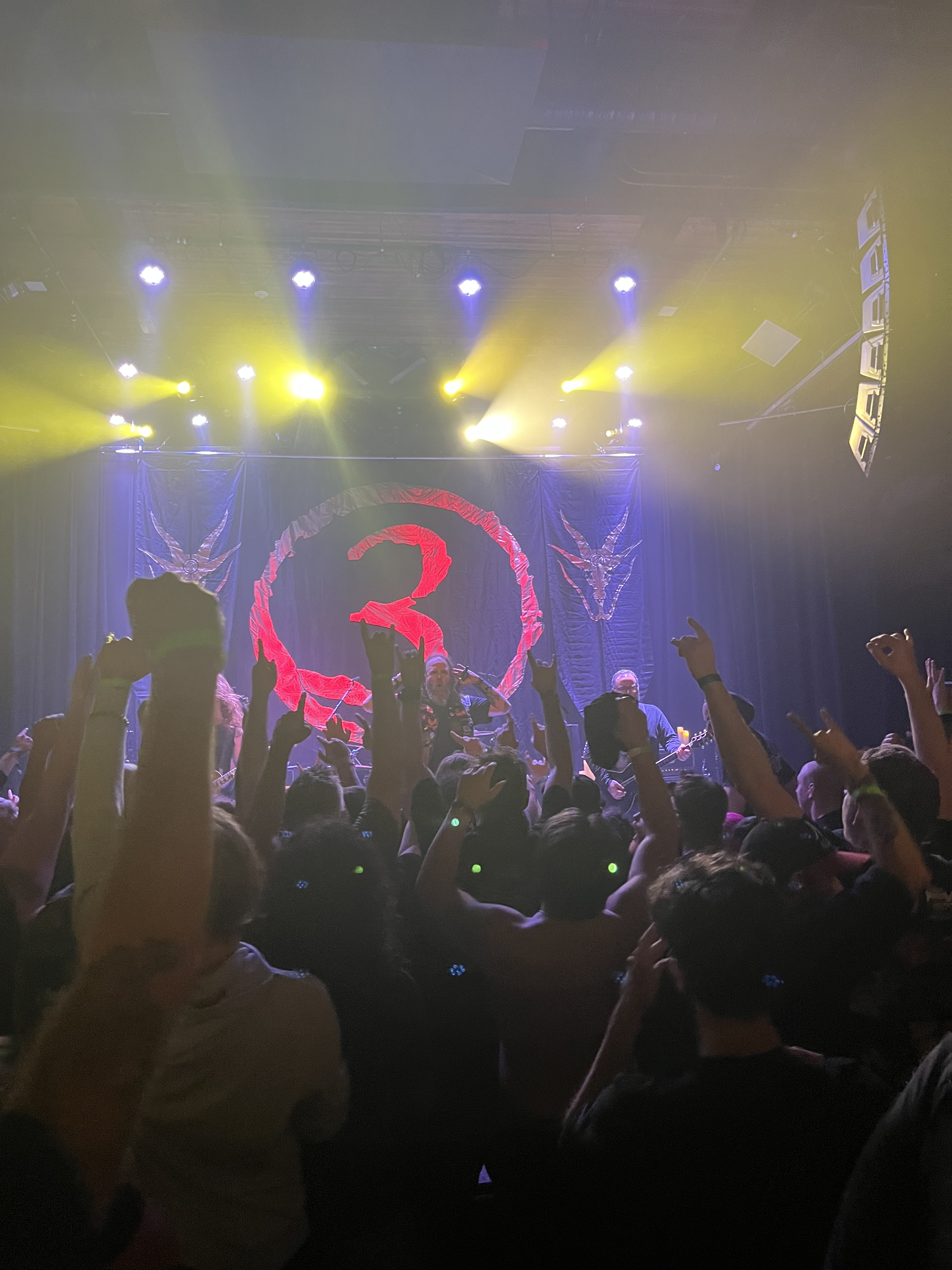
3 Inches of Blood playing Manitoba Metalfest in 2024

On June 2, 2015, the band announced it would be disbanding following two final shows, which took place on November 7 and 8 at the Commodore Ballroom in Vancouver. Pearson joined Revocation.

On September 12, 2023, the band announced they had reunited to perform its first show in nine years at the Commodore Ballroom in Vancouver on January 13, 2024. This show was originally intended as a one-off, but shortly after its announcement, one show set to take place the day before at the Commodore Ballroom was added. An additional third show was then added for January 14, 2024.

On May 10, 2024, the band headlined a sold out Day 1 of Manitoba Metalfest at the Park Theatre in Winnipeg.

3 Inches of Blood is scheduled to perform at France's Hellfest on June 20, 2025. The band is scheduled to perform at the Hell's Heroes music festival in Houston in March 2026.

== Band members ==
Current

- Cam Pipes – clean vocals (1999–2015, 2023–present), bass (2014–2015)
- Shane Clark – lead guitar (2004–2015, 2023–present)
- Justin Hagberg – rhythm guitar (2004–2015, 2023–present), unclean vocals (2008–2015, 2023–present)
- Ash Pearson – drums (2007–2015, 2023–present)
- Nick Cates – bass (2006–2009, 2015, 2023–present)

Former

- Jamie Hooper – screamed vocals (1999–2008)
- Sunny Dhak – lead guitar (1999–2004)
- Bobby Froese – rhythm guitar (1999–2004)
- Rich Trawick – bass (1999–2004)
- Geoff Trawick – drums (1999–2004)
- Jay Watts – guitars (1999–2000)
- Brian Redman – bass (2004–2006; died 2009)
- Matt Wood – drums (2004–2005)
- Alexei Rodriguez – drums (2005–2007)

Live

- Steve Ericson – bass (2009–2011)
- Aaron "Boon" Gustafson – bass (2011)
- Byron Stroud – bass (2012–2013)
- Pete Griffin – bass (2013)
- Matt C – drums (2007)

Timeline

== Discography ==
Albums

- Battlecry Under a Wintersun (2002)
- Advance and Vanquish (2004)
- Fire Up the Blades (2007)
- Here Waits Thy Doom (2009)
- Long Live Heavy Metal (2012)

EPs

- Sect of the White Worm (2001)
- Road Rage Tour 2004 (2004), compilation with Machine Head, Chimaira & Trivium
- Trial of Champions (2007)
- Anthems for the Victorious (2011)

Singles

- "Ride Darkhorse, Ride" (2002)
- "Destroy the Orcs" (2003)
- "Deadly Sinners" (2004)
- "The Goatriders Horde" (2007)
- "Trial of Champions" (2007)
- "Battles and Brotherhood" (2009)
- "Silent Killer" (2010)
- "Call of the Hammer" / Everything's Legal in Alabama", split with Bob Wayne (2011)
- "Metal Woman" (2012)
- "Live at Mushroom: Vol. I" (2013)
- "Live at Mushroom: Vol. II" (2013)
- "Live at Mushroom: Vol. III" (2013)
