= Utility sound technician =

Filmmaking occupation

A utility sound technician, also referred to as sound assistant, sound utility, or cableperson is an assistant to both the production sound mixer and the boom operator on a film or television set. Although sometimes the utility pulls cable and wrangles it for the boom operator, the position has evolved to far more than just a cableperson. The utility is a jack of all trades, assisting in setting up, operating and maintaining the running order of equipment, often acting as a second boom operator, or even second mixer, and also repairing and servicing equipment such as cables and hardware as necessary. As both mixer and boom operator(s) may be busy with their tasks at any given time, the utility may also apply or adjust personal microphones or actors' wireless transmitters, may move microphones or assist in running cables, and may liaise with other departments on issues such as noise minimisation and set lockdown.

A utility may start their career as some form of trainee and move on to utility as their competency increases, or may start as a utility if their experience and knowledge permits. In studio based television production, the route for promotion from sound assistant is to sound technician/operator, and finally to sound supervisor. Formal qualifications are not specified for technicians in studio environments, although employers typically look for basic numeracy and literacy, and a solid foundation in maths and physics. Many applicants have A levels/H grades or have taken courses to certificate, diploma or degree level, such as ft2 (Freelance Film and Television Training). As the film and big budget narrative television industries are typically less corporate in nature than studio based television, utility technicians may have no training other than their experience from simply working in the sound department.

In production sound (on-set film and TV recording, as opposed to post-production re-recording), utilities are a "3rd" position, with the boom operator being "2nd", and mixer the "key" or "1st" position in a sound department, and they assist the 2nd and key. A more specific, non-exhaustive list of duties on production sound environments for Utility Sound Tech includes handling most of the day-to-day operations outside of cameras rolling such as setting up carts for the day's work, ordering expendables from production, setting up bell and light system, setting up playback systems, wiring actors (rigging tiny wireless microphones hidden on actor's costumes), filling out daily timecards for the sound department, cleaning equipment, finding extraneous noisemakers, rigging hidden "plant" microphones on sets and picture vehicles, tracking equipment repairs and losses, coordinating frequencies, wrapping gear, and representing the sound department when the Production Sound Mixer and Boom Operator are not available.

A utility sound technician typical makes between $20-$60 an hour with overtime after 8 hours and double time after 12 hours. This varies depending on their exact role and production budget. Usually the production sound mixer will hire boom operator(s) and utility technicians that they know and trust, although one may be provided by the production in some cases.
