= Battlecry Under a Wintersun =

Studio album by 3 Inches of Blood
- Released: March 2, 2002
- Genres: Heavy metal, power metal
- Length: 37:02
- Label: Megarock
- Producer: Jesse Gander

3 Inches of Blood chronology
Sect of the White Worm (2001)	Battlecry Under a Wintersun (2002)	Advance and Vanquish (2004)

Singles from Battlecry Under a Wintersun
- 1. "Ride Darkhorse, Ride" Released: May 5, 2003; 2. "Destroy the Orcs" Released: October 27, 2003

Professional ratings
Review scores
Source	Rating
AllMusic	3/5 stars
Lambgoat	8/10 stars

Battlecry Under a Wintersun is the debut studio album by Canadian power metal band 3 Inches of Blood. It was released in 2002 by Megarock Records. It is the last release by the band to feature original bassist Rich Trawick and drummer Geoff Trawick. The album peaked at number 18 on the Canadian national college charts and at number 2 on the national loud charts. The album was re-released in 2009 on Minion Records, marking the first time it was made available in the U.S. The reissue also includes 4 bonus tracks, taken from the "Sect of the White Worm" EP.

== Track listing ==
All tracks are written by 3 Inches of Blood except "Journey to the Promiseland", written and performed by guest band S.T.R.E.E.T.S.

No.	Title	Length
1.	"Ride Darkhorse, Ride"	3:26
2.	"Destroy the Orcs"	2:13
3.	"Headwaters of the River of Blood"	3:03
4.	"Heir to the Chaos Throne"	3:42
5.	"Skeletal Onslaught"	3:48
6.	"Journey to the Promiseland"	2:26
7.	"Lady Deathwish"	3:44
8.	"Curse of the Lighthouse Keeper"	3:12
9.	"Blazing Fires of Evermore"	3:16
10.	"Hall of Heroes"	4:21
11.	"Balls of Ice"	3:44

== Personnel ==
- Cam Pipes – clean vocals
- Jamie Hooper – screaming vocals
- Sunny Dhak – lead guitar
- Bobby Froese – rhythm guitar
- Rich Trawick – bass
- Geoff Trawick – drums
- Jesse Gander – producer
