= Cam Pipes =

Canadian singer and bassist

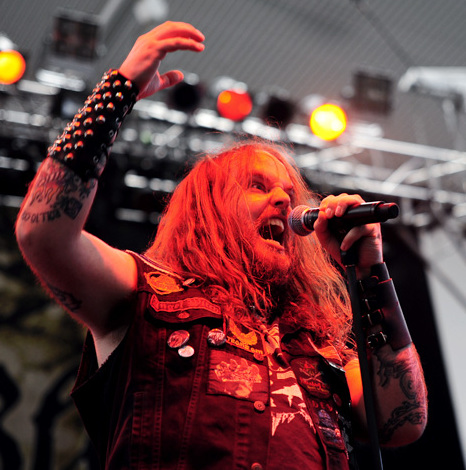
- Pipes in 2010

Background information
- Origin: Vancouver, Canada
- Genres: Heavy metal, power metal, thrash metal, black metal
- Occupations: Musician, singer
- Instruments: Vocals, bass
- Labels: Roadrunner, Century Media
- Formerly of: 3 Inches of Blood, Allfather
- Website: No longer active

Cam Pipes is a Canadian musician who performed as the lead vocalist and bassist in the heavy metal band 3 Inches of Blood. He performs a falsetto vocal style reminiscent of Udo Dirkschneider and King Diamond. Pipes was the only member of 3 Inches of Blood to have been featured on all of their albums, although he was not a founding member of the band.

Pipes' influences include Judas Priest, Iron Maiden, Twisted Sister, Led Zeppelin, Deep Purple, Accept and classical music.

Pipes formerly played bass for black metal band Allfather.

Pipes was also known for playing El Diablo Azul on all three Meat Market films. He also provided the guest voice of a teen with Toki's tell-all book in an episode of Metalocalypse.
