= List of video game crowdfunding projects =

The following is an incomplete list of notable video game projects (in hardware, software, and related media) that have embarked upon crowdfunding campaigns. Only when the amount raised is highlighted in green did the project receive those funds.

| Project | Creator | Platform | Campaign end date | Campaign target | Amount raised | Notes | Release date | Ref. |
|---|---|---|---|---|---|---|---|---|
| Star Racer | Whatnot Games | Kickstarter | 30 December 2023 | $20,000 | $28,810 | Retro science-fiction racing game | Jul 28, 2025 | |
| Postal 2 Redux | Flat2VR Studios | Kickstarter | 13 September, 2025 | $250,000 | $688,457 | Remake of first-person shooter game Postal 2. | TBA | |
| Ahoy | Capstan Games | Kickstarter | 8 July 2025 | £80,000 | £571,449 | Open world multiplayer 18th-century sailing game | TBA | |
| Ephemeris | YrdVaab | Indiegogo | Nov 29, 2024 | €30,000 | €8,400 | 4X space strategy with true 3D combat. | TBA | |
| Stormgate | Frost Giant Studios | Kickstarter, Indiegogo | Feb 1, 2024 | $100,000 | $2,517,187 | A new real-time strategy game by former Blizzard StarCraft II and Warcraft III developers. | Aug 5, 2025 | |
| Rivals 2 | Aether Studios | Kickstarter | Dec 16, 2023 | $200,000 | $1,076,198 | 2.5D platform fighter and the sequel to Rivals of Aether. | Oct 23, 2024 | |
| Loddlenaut | Moon Lagoon | Kickstarter | Jul 12, 2021 | $35,000 | $53,744 | Cozy underwater adventure simulation game combining environmental cleanup with virtual pet mechanics. | Nov 16, 2023 | |
| Friday Night Funkin': The Full Ass Game | Funkin' Crew | Kickstarter | May 18, 2021 | $60,000 | $2,247,641 | Rhythm game. Realization of a Newgrounds prototype. | TBA | |
| Roots of Pacha | Soda Den | Kickstarter | Mar 25, 2021 | $35,000 | $355,388 | Life/farming simulator in a prehistoric setting, inspired by Stardew Valley and Harvest Moon | Apr 25, 2023 | |
| Eiyuden Chronicle: Hundred Heroes | Rabbit & Bear Studios | Kickstarter | Aug 29, 2020 | ¥53,808,516 | ¥481,573,091 | Turn-based RPG, spiritual successor to the Suikoden series being led by the creator of the original games. | Apr 23, 2024 | |
| Magical Girl Witch Trials | Re,AER | Campfire | 30 June 2024 | ¥2,000,000 | ¥66,809,444 | Mystery adventure visual novel game | Jul 18, 2025 | |
| Saint Kotar | Red Martyr Entertainment | Kickstarter | Jul 25, 2020 | €39,000 | €50,178 | Psychological horror point-and-click adventure game. | Oct 28, 2021 | |
| The Wonderful 101: Remastered | PlatinumGames | Kickstarter | Mar 6, 2020 | $50,000 | $2,235,545 | 3D action-adventure hack and slash video game. Remaster of the 2013 Wii U game by PlatinumGames and Hideki Kamiya. | May 19, 2020 | |
| Tales of the Neon Sea | Zodiac Interactive | Kickstarter | Aug 30, 2018 | NZ$14,793 | NZ$22,248 | Cyberpunk adventure game in a pixel art style. | Apr 30, 2019 | |
| Once Upon a Coma | Thomas Brush | Kickstarter | Mar 17, 2018 | $28,000 | $85,683 | 2D action platformer. Sequel to Coma by its original creator, who also created the previously crowdfunded Pinstripe. | Sep 2018 | |
| Starmancer | Ominux Games | Kickstarter | Mar 16, 2018 | $40,000 | $139,685 | Space station sim inspired by Dwarf Fortress. | Aug 5, 2021 (early access) | |
| 40 Winks | Piko Interactive | Kickstarter | Mar 14, 2018 | $20,000 | $131,252 | 3D platform game. First Nintendo 64 game released since the console's discontinuation. | Nov 2018 | |
| Indie Pogo | Lowe Bros. Studios | Kickstarter | Oct 11, 2017 | $25,000 | $41,991 | Crossover fighting game featuring characters and elements from many different indie games. | Jul 10, 2018 | |
| Fantasy Strike | Sirlin Games | Fig | Aug 25, 2017 | $500,000 | $147,819 | Equity crowdfunding campaign. Fighting game by David Sirlin. | Jul 25, 2019 | |
| Pathfinder: Kingmaker | Owlcat Games | Kickstarter | Jul 12, 2017 | $500,000 | $909,057 | Fantasy role-playing video game in the Pathfinder universe. Chris Avellone serves as narrative designer. | Sep 25, 2018 | |
| Blasphemous | The Game Kitchen | Kickstarter | Jun 21, 2017 | $50,000 | $333,246 | 2D action platformer video game in a gothic fantasy world. From the team behind The Last Door. | Sep 10, 2019 | |
| Project Rap Rabbit | Project Rap Rabbit | Kickstarter | Jun 19, 2017 | £855,000 | £161,557 | Music video game by NanaOn-Sha and iNiS, featuring anthropomorphic characters. | Cancelled | |
| Phoenix Point | Snapshot Games | Fig | Jun 8, 2017 | $500,000 | $765,948 | Equity crowdfunding campaign. Turn-based tactics video game similar to the X-COM series. Second crowdfunding campaign from Julian Gollop's Snapshot Games after Chaos Reborn. | Dec 3, 2019 | |
| The Banner Saga 3 | Stoic | Kickstarter | Mar 8, 2017 | $200,000 | $416,986 | Tactical role-playing game set in the Viking Age. Sequel to the previously crowdfunded The Banner Saga. | Jun 26, 2018 | |
| Sunless Skies | Failbetter Games | Kickstarter | Mar 3, 2017 | £100,000 | £377,952 | 2D top-down survival and space exploration game set in the Fallen London fictional universe. Sequel to the previously crowdfunded Sunless Sea. | Jan 31, 2019 | |
| Pillars of Eternity II: Deadfire | Obsidian Entertainment | Fig | Feb 25, 2017 | $1,100,000 | $4,705,524 | Equity crowdfunding campaign. Role-playing video game. Sequel to the previously crowdfunded Pillars of Eternity. | May 8, 2018 | |
| Sundered | Thunder Lotus Games | Kickstarter | Feb 16, 2017 | C$25,000 | C$202,102 | Metroidvania with procedurally generated levels. From the developers of previously Kickstarted Jotun. | Jul 28, 2017 | |
| Apocalypse Now | Erebus | Kickstarter | Feb 15, 2017 | $900,000 | $172,503 | Survival horror role-playing video game. Officially licensed adaptation of the film. The campaign was cancelled before its scheduled 24 February end date. | Cancelled | |
| Kingdoms and Castles | Lion Shield | Fig | Jan 6, 2017 | $15,000 | $108,767 | Equity crowdfunding campaign. Medieval fantasy city-building game. First game to generate a positive return for Fig investors. | Jul 20, 2017 | |
| Chessaria: The Tactical Adventure | Pixel Wizards | Kickstarter | Dec 23, 2016 | €20,000 | €21,438 | Turn-based strategy video game based on chess. | Mar 8, 2018 | |
| Agony | PlayWay | Kickstarter | Dec 10, 2016 | C$66,666 | C$182,642 | First-person survival horror video game set in hell. | May 29, 2018 | |
| Monster Prom | Beautiful Glitch | Kickstarter | Nov 25, 2016 | €8,000 | C$182,642 | Dating sim set in a high school for monsters. | Apr 28, 2018 | |
| Wasteland 3 | inXile entertainment | Fig | Nov 4, 2016 | $2,750,000 | $3,121,716 | Equity crowdfunding campaign. Role-playing video game. Sequel to the previously crowdfunded Wasteland 2. | Aug 28, 2020 | |
| Hypnospace Outlaw | Tendershoot | Kickstarter | Sep 7, 2016 | $28,000 | $35,994 | Adventure video game which is set inside a parody of the early Internet named Hypnospace. | Mar 12, 2019 | |
| 911 Operator | PlayWay | Kickstarter | Aug 20, 2016 | C$9,110 | C$37,924 | Simulation video game wherein players take the role of a dispatcher. | Feb 24, 2017 | |
| Prey for the Gods | No Matter Studios | Kickstarter | Aug 6, 2016 | $300,000 | $501,252 | Action-adventure survival game in a winter landscape. Inspired by Shadow of the Colossus. | Dec 14, 2021 | |
| System Shock | Night Dive Studios | Kickstarter | Jul 28, 2016 | $900,000 | $1,350,700 | First-person shooter action role-playing game. Remake of 1994's System Shock. | May 30, 2023 | |
| Fable Fortune | Flaming Fowl Studios | Kickstarter | Jun 21, 2016 | £250,000 | £58,852 | Fantasy digital collectible card game set in the Fable series by former Lionhead Studios staff. The campaign was cancelled before its scheduled 28 June end date. | Feb 22, 2018 | |
| Boss Fight Books: Season 3 | Gabe Durham | Kickstarter | May 25, 2016 | $5,000 | $36,070 | Book project, the third series of books on video games in the style of 33⅓. The third season of books are, Super Mario Bros. 3 by Alyse Knorr, Mega Man 3 by Salvatore Pane, Soft & Cuddly by Jarett Kobek, Kingdom Hearts II by Alexa Ray Corriea and Katamari Damacy by L.E. Hall. | Jul 16, 2016 (first book) | |
| LUNA: The Shadow Dust | Lantern Studio | Kickstarter | May 6, 2016 | £12,000 | £17,570 | A hand-drawn puzzle point-and-click adventure game | Feb 13, 2020 | |
| Blackroom | Night Work Games | Kickstarter | Apr 29, 2016 | $700,000 | $131,052 | First-person shooter by Doom developers John Romero and Adrian Carmack. Campaign cancelled before its scheduled 28 May end date to focus on development of a demo. | Cancelled | |
| Rock Band 4 for PC | Harmonix | Fig | Apr 5, 2016 | $1,500,000 | $792,817 | Equity crowdfunding campaign. PC port of music video game, Rock Band 4, including Steam Workshop integration to support user-made songs. | Cancelled | |
| Jay and Silent Bob: Chronic Blunt Punch | Interabang Entertainment | Fig | Apr 1, 2016 | $400,000 | $445,467 | Equity crowdfunding campaign. 2D beat 'em up based on the title characters from Kevin Smith | Apr 6, 2026 | |
| The Artful Escape of Francis Vendetti | Johnny Galvatron | Kickstarter | Apr 1, 2016 | A$50,000 | A$32,569 | 2D platform game with a music inspired theme. | Sep 9, 2021 | |
| Mainlining | Rebelephant | Kickstarter | Mar 26, 2016 | £15,000 | £15,822 | Point-and-click hacking game. | Jan 26, 2017 | |
| Pinstripe | Thomas Brush | Kickstarter | Mar 17, 2016 | $28,000 | $106,729 | 2D platform game set in hell. | Apr 25, 2017 | |
| Midnight Stranger | Other Body Enterprises | Kickstarter | Mar 9, 2016 | C$13,000 | C$4,100 | FMV video game. Remake of the 1994 original for modern systems. | Not funded | |
| Knights and Bikes | Foam Swoard | Kickstarter | Mar 3, 2016 | £100,000 | £126,447 | Action-adventure game set in Cornwall by former Media Molecule staff. | Aug 27, 2019 | |
| Battalion 1944 | Bulkhead Interactive | Kickstarter | Mar 3, 2016 | £100,000 | £317,281 | First-person shooter multiplayer video game set in World War II | May 23, 2019 | |
| Fabulous Beasts | Sensible Object | Kickstarter | Feb 25, 2016 | £150,000 | £168,360 | Toys-to-life video game. Players must stack animal shaped toys to build a tower. Renamed to Beasts of Balance following a trademark dispute. | Nov 22, 2016 | |
| Wandersong | Greg Lobanov | Kickstarter | Feb 20, 2016 | $18,000 | $21,936 | Side-scrolling adventure game that uses music as a mechanic for solving various puzzles. | Sep 27, 2018 | |
| Psychonauts 2 | Double Fine Productions | Fig | Jan 12, 2016 | $3,300,000 | $3,829,024 | Equity crowdfunding campaign. 3D platform game. Sequel to Psychonauts | Aug 25, 2021 | |
| Indivisible | Lab Zero Games | Indiegogo | Dec 4, 2015 | $1,500,000 | $1,889,599 | Action role-playing game with Metroidvania-style exploration and combat mechanics inspired by Valkyrie Profile. Soundtrack by Hiroki Kikuta. The campaign was extended past its original 16 November end date. | Oct 8, 2019 | |
| Friday the 13th: The Game | Gun Media | Kickstarter | Nov 14, 2015 | $700,000 | $823,704 | First-person asymmetric multiplayer horror video game. One player controls Jason Voorhees and must kill the other players. Not to be confused with Last Year. | May 26, 2017 | |
| BattleTech | Harebrained Schemes | Kickstarter | Nov 3, 2015 | $250,000 | $2,785,537 | Turn-based strategy game with RPG elements based on the BattleTech franchise. | Apr 24, 2018 | |
| Them's Fightin' Herds | Mane6 | Indiegogo | Oct 22, 2015 | $436,000 | $587,026 | 2D fighting game, formerly based on My Little Pony: Friendship is Magic. | Apr 30, 2020 | |
| Aurion: Legacy of the Kori-Odan | Kiro'o Games | Kickstarter | Oct 20, 2015 | €40,000 | €49,774 | Action RPG in an African fantasy setting, by Cameroonian developers. | Apr 14, 2016 | |
| Allison Road | Lilith | Kickstarter | Oct 12, 2015 | £250,000 | £145,959 | First-person horror video game inspired by P.T.. Campaign cancelled before its scheduled 21 October end date after securing publisher funding. Game cancelled in June 2016. | Cancelled | |
| Battle Chasers: Nightwar | Airship Syndicate | Kickstarter | Oct 10, 2015 | $500,000 | $856,354 | RPG with procedurally generated content. Set in Joe Madureira's Battle Chasers universe by former Vigil Games staff. | Oct 3, 2017 | |
| Saber Rider and the Star Sheriffs – The Game | Team Saber Rider | Kickstarter | Oct 5, 2015 | $75,000 | $96,592 | 2D shoot 'em up based on Saber Rider and the Star Sheriffs. | TBA | |
| Divinity: Original Sin 2 | Larian Studios | Kickstarter | Sep 30, 2015 | $500,000 | $2,032,434 | Role-playing video game. Sequel to Larian's previous Kickstarter project, Divinity: Original Sin | Sep 14, 2017 | |
| Outer Wilds | Mobius Digital | Fig | Sep 17, 2015 | $125,000 | $126,480 | Equity crowdfunding campaign. Open world exploration video game. | May 29, 2019 | |
| Everspace | Rockfish Games | Kickstarter | Sep 11, 2015 | €225,000 | €420,252 | Space combat video game with roguelike elements. From the team behind Galaxy on Fire. | May 25, 2017 | |
| Poi | PolyKid | Kickstarter | Sep 3, 2015 | $80,000 | $27,236 | 3D platform game inspired by Nintendo 64 and GameCube-era platformers. | Feb 1, 2017 | |
| Red Ash: The Indelible Legend | Comcept | Kickstarter | Aug 3, 2015 | $800,000 | $519,999 | 3D action-adventure video game and spiritual successor to the Mega Man Legends series, by Keiji Inafune, its original producer. Comcept's second Kickstarter project after Mighty No. 9. Cancelled after supposed external funding was secured, but currently presumed permanently cancelled. | Cancelled | |
| Shenmue III | Ys Net | Kickstarter | Jul 17, 2015 | $2,000,000 | $6,333,296 | Action-adventure video game. Third game in the Shenmue series, by Yu Suzuki, its original director. Announced at Sony's E3 2015 presentation. Succeeded Bloodstained: Ritual of the Night as the highest funded Kickstarter video game. | Nov 19, 2019 | |
| The Bard's Tale IV | inXile Entertainment | Kickstarter | Jul 10, 2015 | $1,250,000 | $1,519,680 | First person fantasy dungeon crawling role-playing video game. | Sep 18, 2018 | |
| We Happy Few | Compulsion Games | Kickstarter | Jul 4, 2015 | C$250,000 | C$334,754 | First person open world survival video game set in a procedurally generated alternate history 1960's Britain. | Aug 10, 2018 | |
| Squad | Offworld Industries | Kickstarter | Jun 27, 2015 | C$184,000 | C$434,805 | Tactical first-person shooter. First commercial project from the Project Reality mod team. | Sep 23, 2020 | |
| Perception | The Deep End Games | Kickstarter | Jun 25, 2015 | $150,000 | $168,041 | First-person horror video game featuring a blind protagonist navigating the world through echolocation, by former Irrational Games staff. Not to be confused with Pulse. | May 30, 2017 | |
| The Aquatic Adventure of the Last Human | YCJY | Kickstarter | Jun 18, 2015 | 52,000 kr | 61,777 kr | Metroidvania set in a pixel art underwater world. | Jan 19, 2016 | |
| Yooka-Laylee | Playtonic Games | Kickstarter | Jun 17, 2015 | £175,000 | £2,090,104 | 3D platform game and spiritual successor to the Banjo-Kazooie series by members of the original team. | Apr 11, 2017 | |
| Hero-U: Rogue to Redemption | The Coles | Kickstarter | Jun 16, 2015 | $100,000 | $116,888 | Fantasy turn-based RPG with adventure game elements by the designers of the Quest for Glory series. Second Kickstarter campaign for the game necessitated by an increased scope. | Jul 9, 2018 | |
| Bloodstained: Ritual of the Night | Koji Igarashi | Kickstarter | Jun 12, 2015 | $500,000 | $5,545,991 | Metroidvania video game, by former Castlevania producer Koji Igarashi. Succeeded Torment: Tides of Numenera as the highest funded Kickstarter video game, was succeeded by Shenmue III in July 2015. | Jun 18, 2019 | |
| Tokyo Dark | Cherrymochi Game Studio | Kickstarter | Jun 10, 2015 | C$40,000 | C$225,386 | 2D point-and-click adventure game inspired by Heavy Rain and Higurashi When They Cry. | Sep 7, 2017 | |
| Loud on Planet X | Pop Sandbox | Kickstarter | Jun 5, 2015 | C$50,000 | C$53,006 | Rhythm and tower defense game with music and likenesses from Tegan and Sara, Purity Ring, METZ, Metric, Lights, July Talk, Fucked Up, Cadence Weapon, and Austra. | Apr 19, 2016 | |
| Ultimate Chicken Horse | Clever Endeavour Games | Kickstarter | May 17, 2015 | C$25,000 | C$34,155 | Multiplayer platform game. | Mar 4, 2016 | |
| CrossCode | Felix Klein | Indiegogo | Apr 26, 2015 | €80,000 | €90,026 | 2D action RPG in a science fiction setting, inspired by the 16-bit era. The campaign was extended past its original 27 March end date. | Sep 21, 2018 | |
| Ships That Fight Underground | Little Orbit | Kickstarter | Apr 11, 2015 | $600,000 | $601,773 | First-person shooter with six degrees of freedom. Originally developed by Descendant Studios as Descent: Underground. | TBA | |
| Halcyon 6: Starbase Commander | Massive Damage | Kickstarter | Apr 9, 2015 | C$40,000 | C$187,706 | Strategy video game with base building and turn-based tactical elements in a science fiction setting. | Sep 9, 2016 | |
| ToeJam & Earl: Back in the Groove | Humanature Studios | Kickstarter | Mar 27, 2015 | $400,000 | $508,637 | Roguelike action game. Sequel to ToeJam & Earl by Greg Johnson, its original designer. | Mar 1, 2019 | |
| Crowfall | ArtCraft Entertainment, Inc. | Kickstarter | Mar 26, 2015 | $800,000 | $1,766,204 | Fantasy MMORPG by J. Todd Coleman and Gordon Walton, Raph Koster serves as consultant. | Jul 6, 2021 | |
| Underworld Ascendant | OtherSide Entertainment | Kickstarter | Mar 6, 2015 | $600,000 | $860,356 | First person role-playing video game. Sequel to the Ultima Underworld series; by Paul Neurath and former Looking Glass staff. | Nov 15, 2018 | |
| This Is the Police | Weappy | Kickstarter | Feb 26, 2015 | $25,000 | $35,508 | Business simulation game featuring police corruption. | Aug 2, 2016 | |
| Project Scissors: NightCry | Playism Games | Kickstarter | Feb 23, 2015 | $300,000 | $314,771 | Survival horror video game by Hifumi Kono, creator of the Clock Tower series and Takashi Shimizu, creator of the Ju-on and The Grudge series. Campaign to bring the mobile game onto PC platforms. Second campaign run by Playism Games after La-Mulana 2. | Mar 29, 2016 | |
| Strafe | Pixel Titans | Kickstarter | Feb 19, 2015 | $185,000 | $207,847 | First-person shooter video game inspired by first person shooters of the 1990s, featuring procedurally generated levels. | May 9, 2017 | |
| Shadowrun: Hong Kong | Harebrained Schemes | Kickstarter | Feb 17, 2015 | $100,000 | $1,204,726 | Single-player tactical role-playing game in the Shadowrun universe. | Aug 20, 2015 | |
| Into the Stars | Fugitive Games | Kickstarter | Feb 4, 2015 | $85,000 | $111,274 | Space flight simulator game by former DICE staff. Soundtrack by Jack Wall. | Mar 4, 2016 | |
| Clannad | sekaiproject | Kickstarter | Jan 9, 2015 | $140,000 | $541,161 | Visual novel. Campaign to fund English localisations. | Nov 23, 2015 | |
| Aviary Attorney | Sketchy Logic | Kickstarter | Jan 8, 2015 | £7,000 | £18,917 | Adventure game in the style of the Ace Attorney series, featuring the public domain anthropomorphic artwork of J. J. Grandville. | Dec 22, 2015 | |
| Hollow Knight | Team Cherry | Kickstarter | Dec 19, 2014 | A$35,000 | A$57,138 | Metroidvania side-scrolling action adventure video game. | Feb 24, 2017 | |
| Thimbleweed Park | Ron Gilbert & Gary Winnick | Kickstarter | Dec 18, 2014 | $375,000 | $626,250 | Point-and-click adventure game from the designers of Maniac Mansion. | Mar 30, 2017 | |
| Crossing Souls | Fourattic | Kickstarter | Dec 17, 2014 | $45,000 | $51,983 | 2D action-adventure video game inspired by 1980s pop culture. | Feb 13, 2018 | |
| That Dragon, Cancer | Ryan Green & Josh Larson | Kickstarter | Dec 12, 2014 | $85,000 | $104,491 | First person autobiographical video game by Ryan Green, showing through Ryan's eyes, his son's life with terminal cancer. | Jan 12, 2016 | |
| Prismata | Lunarch Studios | Kickstarter | Dec 4, 2014 | C$140,000 | C$140,000 | Turn-based strategy card video game. | Mar 8, 2018 (early access) | |
| Video Games Live: Level 4 | Tommy Tallarico | Kickstarter | Nov 29, 2014 | $150,000 | $187,646 | Fourth album of video game music by Video Games Live. | Feb 18, 2015 | |
| Convoy | Convoy Games | Kickstarter | Nov 29, 2014 | €10,000 | €22,408 | Roguelike video game inspired by Mad Max and FTL: Faster Than Light. | Apr 21, 2015 | |
| Her Majesty's Spiffing | BillyGoat Entertainment | Kickstarter | Nov 21, 2014 | £30,000 | £33,813 | Point-and-click adventure comedy video game. | Dec 7, 2016 | |
| 2Dark | Gloomywood | Ulule | Nov 21, 2014 | $32,967 | $37,284 | The new Survival Horror from Frederick Raynal. | Mar 10, 2017 | |
| Boss Fight Books: Season Two | Gabe Durham | Kickstarter | Nov 19, 2014 | $5,000 | $53,186 | Book project, the second series of books on video games in the style of 33⅓. The second season of books are, Metal Gear Solid by Anthony and Ashly Burch, Baldur's Gate II by Matt Bell, Bible Adventures by Gabe Durham, Spelunky by Derek Yu, and World of Warcraft by Daniel Lisi. | Mar 30, 2015 (first book) | |
| The Flame in the Flood | The Molasses Flood | Kickstarter | Nov 7, 2014 | $150,000 | $251,647 | Roguelike survival video game set in a post-societal America by former Irrational Games staff. Soundtrack by Chuck Ragan. | Feb 24, 2016 | |
| Nevermind | Erin Reynolds | Kickstarter | Nov 3, 2014 | $75,000 | $76,525 | Survival horror video game with dynamic difficulty based on biofeedback. Fourth crowdfunding campaign for the game, and second Kickstarter campaign for the project, with a lowered target after the failure of its previous campaign. | Sep 29, 2015 | |
| Battle Chef Brigade | Trinket Studios | Kickstarter | Oct 27, 2014 | $38,000 | $100,344 | 2D fantasy action game. | Nov 20, 2017 | |
| Bedlam | Skyshine Games | Kickstarter | Oct 25, 2014 | $130,000 | $166,540 | Tactical role-playing game with roguelike elements set in a post-apocalyptic landscape. | Sep 16, 2015 | |
| Elegy for a Dead World | Dejobaan Games | Kickstarter | Oct 21, 2014 | $48,000 | $72,339 | Science fiction writing video game. | Dec 10, 2014 | |
| Human Resources | Uber Entertainment | Kickstarter | Oct 20, 2014 | $1,400,000 | $384,358 | Real-time strategy video game fought between a machine army and Lovecraftian monsters. Uber's second Kickstarter project after Planetary Annihilation in September 2012. The campaign was cancelled before its scheduled 4 November end date after it looked unlikely to succeed. | Cancelled | |
| Pathologic | Ice-Pick Lodge | Kickstarter | Oct 7, 2014 | $250,000 | $333,127 | Psychological horror video game. Remake of the 2005 game by the original developers. Released as Pathologic 2. Ice-Pick Lodge's second Kickstarter project after Knock-Knock in September 2012. | May 23, 2019 | |
| Paradigm | Jacob Janerka | Kickstarter | Oct 6, 2014 | A$14,000 | A$36,557 | Point-and-click adventure comedy video game. | Apr 5, 2017 | |
| Ironcast | Dreadbit | Kickstarter | Oct 3, 2014 | £10,000 | £10,183 | Match-3 puzzle game featuring steampunk mecha. | Mar 26, 2015 | |
| Poncho | Delve Interactive | Kickstarter | Oct 2, 2014 | £22,500 | £8,235 | 2D puzzle platform video game. Released following publisher funding. | Nov 3, 2015 | |
| Moon Hunters | Kitfox Games | Kickstarter | Sep 26, 2014 | C$45,000 | C$178,986 | 2D action role-playing game with co-operative multiplayer in a fantasy world featuring procedurally generated content. | Mar 10, 2016 | |
| Parkitect | Texel Raptor | Kickstarter | Sep 21, 2014 | C$50,000 | C$63,750 | Construction and management simulation theme park video game. | Nov 29, 2018 | |
| GX3 | GaymerX | Kickstarter | Sep 19, 2014 | $80,000 | $97,917 | Inclusive gaming convention in San Francisco. Successor to the previously Kickstarted GaymerX and GaymerX2 conferences. | Dec 2015 | |
| Night Trap Revamped | Night Trap, LLC | Kickstarter | Sep 10, 2014 | $330,000 | $39,843 | HD remaster of the 1992 interactive movie. | Aug 15, 2017 | |
| The Sun Also Rises | Horse Volume | Kickstarter | Sep 6, 2014 | $15,000 | $16,443 | Adventure game exploring the war on terror based on accounts from American servicemen and Afghan civilians. Part of Ouya's Free the Games fund matching scheme. | TBA | |
| Hard West | CreativeForge Games | Kickstarter | Sep 6, 2014 | C$70,000 | C$94,183 | Turn-based tactics video game in a weird west setting. | Nov 18, 2015 | |
| Kona | Parabole | Kickstarter | Sep 6, 2014 | C$40,000 | C$44,271 | Survival adventure game set in wintry 1970s Quebec. Game in French and English. | Mar 17, 2017 | |
| Elysian Shadows | Elysian Shadows Team | Kickstarter | Aug 31, 2014 | $150,000 | $185,322 | 2D role-playing video game inspired by the 16-bit era. Part of Ouya's Free the Games fund matching scheme. | TBA | |
| Cyberith Virtualizer | Cyberith | Kickstarter | Aug 31, 2014 | $250,000 | $361,452 | Omnidirectional treadmill-like device for use with virtual reality head-mounted displays such as the Oculus Rift. | TBA | |
| Jotun | William Dubé | Kickstarter | Aug 21, 2014 | $50,000 | $64,265 | Action video game pitting the players against the Jotun of Norse mythology, set in procedurally generated levels. | Sep 29, 2015 | |
| Timespinner | Lunar Ray Games | Kickstarter | Jul 25, 2014 | $50,000 | $176,667 | Metroidvania game with time travel mechanics. | Sep 25, 2018 | |
| The Deer God | Josh Presseisen | Kickstarter | Jul 23, 2014 | $26,000 | $51,953 | 2.5D platform game. Players control a deer through procedurally generated levels. | Feb 27, 2015 | |
| Areal | West Games | Kickstarter | Jul 22, 2014 | $50,000 | $64,928 | First-person shooter set in a post-apocalyptic open world. Spiritual successor to the S.T.A.L.K.E.R. series by some of its original developers. The developers were criticised for overstating their ties to the S.T.A.L.K.E.R. series and misuse of its assets. The campaign was cancelled before its scheduled 24 July end date after breaching Kickstarter rules. | Cancelled | |
| Sunset | Tale of Tales | Kickstarter | Jul 17, 2014 | $25,000 | $67,636 | First-person interactive fiction set during a revolution in 1970s South America. | May 21, 2015 | |
| Control VR | The Control VR Team | Kickstarter | Jul 5, 2014 | $250,000 | $442,227 | Motion capture suit video game controller with support for virtual reality head-mounted displays. | TBA | |
| Twilight Struggle | GMT Games | Kickstarter | Jul 4, 2014 | $50,000 | $391,047 | Turn-based strategy digital version of the Cold War-set board game. | Apr 13, 2016 | |
| Sheltered | Unicube | Kickstarter | Jul 4, 2014 | £15,000 | £30,148 | Survival strategy video game in a post-apocalyptic setting. | Mar 15, 2016 | |
| AntVR Kit | AntVR | Kickstarter | Jun 23, 2014 | $200,000 | $260,834 | Virtual reality head-mounted display and game controller kit. Shipped to backers in December 2014. | Dec 24, 2014 | |
| Superhot | Superhot Team | Kickstarter | Jun 14, 2014 | $100,000 | $250,798 | First-person shooter where time only moves forward when the player moves. | Feb 25, 2016 | |
| Red Goddess | Yanim Studio | Kickstarter | Jun 6, 2014 | $30,000 | $40,235 | 2.5D Metroidvania game. Second campaign after first KS failed to reach its funding goal. | Jun 30, 2015 | |
| Codemancer | Robert Lockhart | Kickstarter | May 28, 2014 | $12,000 | $52,725 | Educational video game to teach players computer programming. | Aug 12, 2019 | |
| A History of the Great Empires of Eve Online | Andrew Groen | Kickstarter | May 25, 2014 | $12,500 | $95,729 | Book project chronicling the player-driven history of the first ten years of Eve Online. Released as Empires of Eve: A History of the Great Wars of Eve Online. | Apr 4, 2016 | |
| Amplitude | Harmonix | Kickstarter | May 23, 2014 | $775,000 | $844,107 | Music video game. Successor to Amplitude by its original developers, exclusively for PlayStation platforms. | Jan 5, 2016 | |
| DieselStörmers | Black Forest Games | Kickstarter | May 23, 2014 | $50,000 | $52,931 | 2.5D fantasy run and gun video game with co-operative multiplayer. Second Kickstarter campaign for the game previously titled Project Ravensdale. Released as Rogue Stormers. | Apr 21, 2016 | |
| Exogenesis: Perils of Rebirth | Kwan | Kickstarter | May 22, 2014 | $32,000 | $56,288 | Adventure game and visual novel inspired by Ace Attorney and Zero Escape. | Apr 20, 2019 (early access) | |
| The Old City | PostMod Softworks | Kickstarter | May 21, 2014 | $32,000 | $13,567 | First-person exploration video game. The campaign was cancelled before its scheduled 28 May end date after it looked unlikely to succeed. Subsequently, split into episodic format, the first episode – The Old City: Leviathan was released in December 2014. | Dec 13, 2014 (first episode) | |
| Heart Forth, Alicia | Alonso Martin | Kickstarter | May 16, 2014 | $60,000 | $232,365 | Metroidvania RPG inspired by video games of the 1990s. | TBA | |
| The Town of Light | LKA | Indiegogo | May 13, 2014 | €30,000 | €2,469 | Flexible funding campaign. First-person psychological horror video game, set in the Volterra psychiatric hospital. Features virtual reality support. | Feb 26, 2016 | |
| Technolust | Iris V.R. | Kickstarter | May 10, 2014 | C$30,000 | C$64,477 | Cyberpunk adventure game for exclusively for virtual reality devices such as the Oculus Rift. | Apr 20, 2016 | |
| Last Life | Sam Farmer | Kickstarter | May 9, 2014 | $75,000 | $103,058 | Adventure game in a science fiction noir setting. Published by Double Fine Productions. | TBA | |
| Storium | Storium / Stephen Hood | Kickstarter | May 9, 2014 | $25,000 | $251,362 | Collaborative story-telling platform featuring fictional universes by Jason Morningstar, Nancy Holder and others. Stretch goals included fictional universes from Mur Lafferty, Saladin Ahmed, Elizabeth Bear, Steve Jackson Games and the Champions universe among others. | Mar 1, 2016 | |
| Armello | League of Geeks | Kickstarter | May 8, 2014 | A$200,000 | A$305,360 | Digital fantasy role-playing board game. | Sep 1, 2015 | |
| Outcast Reboot HD | Fresh3D | Kickstarter | May 7, 2014 | $600,000 | $268,964 | Open world fantasy action-adventure game. HD remake of Outcast by its original developers. Released as Outcast: Second Contact. | Nov 14, 2017 | |
| Treachery in Beatdown City | Shawn Alexander Allen | Kickstarter | May 7, 2014 | $49,000 | $50,473 | Turn-based RPG in a 2D pixel art beat 'em up style. Second Kickstarter campaign for the game following the failure of the first campaign. | Mar 21, 2020 | |
| Shaq Fu: A Legend Reborn | Big Deez Productions | Indiegogo | May 5, 2014 | $450,000 | $473,884 | Flexible funding campaign. Action video game starring Shaquille O'Neal. Sequel to the 1994 original. The campaign was extended two weeks beyond its initial 20 April end date. | Jun 5, 2018 | |
| Prodigy Tactics | Hanakai Studio | Kickstarter | May 2, 2014 | $100,000 | $212,194 | Fantasy tactical role-playing game played with Skylanders style NFC figurines on a physical game board. | Sep 28, 2018 | |
| Serpent in the Staglands | Whalenought Studios | Kickstarter | Apr 26, 2014 | $10,000 | $28,058 | Fantasy RPG in the style of Baldur's Gate series. | May 28, 2015 | |
| Hero Generations | Heart Shaped Games | Kickstarter | Apr 26, 2014 | $32,000 | $46,190 | Turn-based strategy fantasy video game. Enhanced remake of a Facebook game. Part of Ouya's Free the Games fund matching scheme. | Apr 10, 2015 | |
| Hex Heroes | Prismatic Games | Kickstarter | Apr 24, 2014 | $80,000 | $86,946 | Real-time strategy video game featuring asymmetric co-operative multiplayer and Wii U GamePad support. | TBA | |
| Choice Chamber | OneMrBean | Kickstarter | Apr 21, 2014 | $30,000 | $35,612 | 2D action platform video game to be played across the Twitch video streaming network, incorporating audience interaction in a style similar to Twitch Plays Pokémon. The game was partly funded by Twitch. | Jul 16, 2015 | |
| Chaos Reborn | Julian Gollop | Kickstarter | Apr 17, 2014 | $180,000 | $210,854 | Turn-based strategy video game. Sequel to Chaos: The Battle of Wizards by its original designer. The campaign video features support from Ken Levine. | Oct 26, 2015 | |
| JetGetters | tinyBuild | Kickstarter | Apr 16, 2014 | $50,000 | $51,707 | Multiplayer aerial combat action game inspired by the stunts of Just Cause 2 and Battlefield 3. Second Kickstarter campaign by tinyBuild after No Time to Explain in May 2011. The campaign was cancelled before its scheduled 18 April end date despite achieving its target after the developer secured publisher funding. | Cancelled | |
| AdvertCity | VoxelStorm | Kickstarter | Apr 15, 2014 | £1,200 | £4,477 | Cyberpunk advertising tycoon game. | Apr 17, 2015 | |
| Dead Synchronicity: Tomorrow Comes Today | Fictiorama Studios | Kickstarter | Apr 12, 2014 | $45,000 | $51,501 | Point-and-click adventure game in a post-apocalyptic setting. | Apr 10, 2015 | |
| Earthlock: Festival of Magic | Snowcastle Games | Kickstarter | Apr 11, 2014 | $150,000 | $178,193 | Turn-based RPG. Second Kickstarter campaign for the game, with a lowered target after the failure of the first campaign. | Sep 27, 2016 | |
| Dragon Fin Soup | Grimm Bros | Kickstarter | Apr 11, 2014 | $24,000 | $119,719 | RPG set in a dark fairy tale-inspired world featuring roguelike elements. | Nov 3, 2015 | |
| Duelyst | Counterplay Games | Kickstarter | Apr 10, 2014 | $68,000 | $137,708 | Turn-based strategy collectible card game video game. | Apr 27, 2016 | |
| Frog Fractions 2 | Twinbeard | Kickstarter | Apr 9, 2014 | $60,000 | $72,107 | Comedy video game. Commercial sequel to the free Frog Fractions browser game. Released as part of Glittermitten Grove. | Dec 24, 2016 | |
| Planets³ | Cubical Drift | Kickstarter | Apr 6, 2014 | $250,000 | $310,708 | 3D open world voxel-based RPG. Renamed to Stellar Overload. | Canceled | |
| Age of Ascent | Illyriad Games | Kickstarter | Apr 4, 2014 | $150,000 | $4,810 | Space trading and combat simulator MMO from the developers of grand strategy MMO Illyriad. The campaign was cancelled before its scheduled 14 April end date after it looked unlikely to succeed. | Cancelled | |
| Celestian Tales: Old North | Ekuator Games | Kickstarter | Apr 2, 2014 | NZ$30,000 | NZ$60,630 | Turn-based RPG. Second Kickstarter campaign for the game, with a lowered target after the failure of the first campaign. | Aug 11, 2015 | |
| PrioVR | YEI Technology | Kickstarter | Mar 31, 2014 | $75,000 | $322,103 | Motion capture suit video game controller with support for virtual reality head-mounted displays. Second Kickstarter campaign for the device, with a lowered target after the failure of the first campaign. | TBA | |
| Oscar | Team Sharkeye | Kickstarter | Mar 29, 2014 | C$40,000 | C$40,814 | 2D platform game exploring childhood anxieties. | TBA | |
| GaymerX2 | GaymerX | Kickstarter | Mar 25, 2014 | $10,000 | $24,298 | Gaymer convention in San Francisco. Third Kickstarter campaign by GaymerX after GaymerCon in August 2012 and Read Only Memories in December 2013. Convention held in July 2014. | Jul 2014 | |
| The Book of Unwritten Tales 2 | King Art Games | Kickstarter | Mar 23, 2014 | $65,000 | $171,593 | Point-and-click adventure game in a comedic fantasy setting. Sequel to The Book of Unwritten Tales by its original developers. King Art Games' second Kickstarter project after Battle Worlds: Kronos in April 2013. | Feb 20, 2015 | |
| Treachery in Beatdown City | Shawn Alexander Allen | Kickstarter | Mar 15, 2014 | $50,000 | $21,342 | Turn-based RPG in a 2D pixel art beat 'em up style. | Mar 21, 2020 | |
| Darkest Dungeon | Red Hook Studios | Kickstarter | Mar 14, 2014 | $75,000 | $313,337 | Roguelike dungeon crawling role-playing video game with turn-based combat. | Jan 20, 2016 | |
| Tabletop Simulator | Berserk Games | Kickstarter | Mar 13, 2014 | $10,000 | $37,403 | 3D tabletop gaming simulator with mod support. Stretch goals reached allowed castAR, Oculus Rift, and mod support. | Jun 5, 2015 | |
| Nevermind | Erin Reynolds | Kickstarter | Mar 7, 2014 | $250,000 | $129,615 | Survival horror video game with dynamic difficulty based on biofeedback. Third crowdfunding campaign for the game, first Kickstarter campaign for the game after two campaigns on Indiegogo. | Sep 29, 2015 | |
| La-Mulana 2 | Playism Games | Kickstarter | Feb 23, 2014 | $200,000 | $266,670 | 2D action-adventure platform game. Sequel to La-Mulana by its original creator. | Jul 30, 2018 | |
| Pantheon: Rise of the Fallen | Visionary Realms | Kickstarter | Feb 22, 2014 | $800,000 | $460,657 | Fantasy MMORPG by Brad McQuaid, designer of EverQuest. | Dec 2024 (early access) | |
| Kingdom Come: Deliverance | Warhorse Studios | Kickstarter | Feb 20, 2014 | £300,000 | £1,106,371 | First-person open world role-playing video game in a medieval setting. Crowdfunding success will allow Warhorse Studios access to external investment from Zdeněk Bakala. | Feb 13, 2018 | |
| Outerlands: Season One | Area 5 | Kickstarter | Feb 15, 2014 | $210,000 | $247,481 | Documentary video series examining video games culture. By the team behind The 1UP Show, I am Street Fighter and Grounded: The Making of The Last of Us . | Dec 19, 2017 | |
| Unsung Story | Playdek | Kickstarter | Feb 14, 2014 | $600,000 | $660,126 | Fantasy tactical role-playing game by Yasumi Matsuno, director of Final Fantasy Tactics. | Dec 17, 2020 (early access) | |
| Rain World | Videocult | Kickstarter | Feb 14, 2014 | $25,000 | $63,255 | 2D action platform video game. | Mar 28, 2017 | |
| Mega Man: The Board Game | Jasco Games | Kickstarter | Jan 19, 2014 | $70,000 | $415,041 | Board game project, starring the officially licensed Mega Man character. | Feb 12, 2016 | |
| Contradiction: Spot the Liar! | Tim Follin | Kickstarter | Jan 17, 2014 | £3,000 | £4,010 | Adventure game murder mystery presented through FMV. | Jul 10, 2015 | |
| Diplopia | James Blaha | Indiegogo | Jan 12, 2014 | $2,000 | $20,535 | Flexible funding campaign. Virtual reality video game designed to restore stereo vision in players with amblyopia or strabismus. Kickstarter's prohibition of medical products lead to the project launching on Indiegogo instead. Renamed Vivid Vision and released in October 2017 for home use. | Oct 11, 2017 | |
| Reset | Theory Interactive | Indiegogo | Dec 23, 2013 | €65,000 | €71,398 | First-person science fiction puzzle video game. Players must travel back in time to solve puzzles with their past selves. | TBA | |
| 1979 Revolution: Black Friday | iNK Stories | Kickstarter | Dec 16, 2013 | $395,000 | $304,741 | Action-adventure game set in Tehran during the 1979 Iranian Revolution. | Apr 5, 2016 | |
| Lisa | Austin Jorgensen | Kickstarter | Dec 14, 2013 | $7,000 | $16,492 | 2D role-playing video game in a post-apocalyptic setting. | Dec 15, 2014 | |
| Hand of Fate | Defiant Development | Kickstarter | Dec 13, 2013 | A$50,000 | A$54,095 | Fantasy digital collectible card game with action RPG elements. Ian Livingstone features as a guest designer. | Feb 17, 2015 | |
| Read Only Memories | GaymerX | Kickstarter | Dec 13, 2013 | $62,064 | $64,378 | Cyberpunk adventure game in a pixel art style featuring queer characters. Part of Ouya's Free the Games fund matching scheme. Second Kickstarter campaign from GaymerX after GaymerCon in August 2012. | Oct 6, 2015 | |
| Dex | Dreadlocks Ltd. | Kickstarter | Dec 12, 2013 | £14,000 | £30,647 | Side-scrolling, action role-playing video game set in a cyberpunk world. | May 7, 2015 | |
| Sega Mega Drive/Genesis: Collected Works | Darren Wall | Kickstarter | Dec 9, 2013 | £30,000 | £98,725 | Book project. Documentary art book chronicling the history of the Sega Mega Drive/Genesis. | Nov 6, 2014 | |
| Wings: Remastered | Cinemaware | Kickstarter | Dec 9, 2013 | $85,000 | $91,380 | HD remastering of the 1990 Amiga game Wings. This follows a previously unsuccessful $350,000 Kickstarter campaign from 2012. | Oct 17, 2014 | |
| Festival of Magic | Snowcastle Games | Kickstarter | Dec 9, 2013 | $250,000 | $49,286 | Turn-based fantasy RPG. The campaign was cancelled before its scheduled 21 December end date. First Kickstarter campaign for the game. | Sep 27, 2016 | |
| Tadpole Treble | Matthew Taranto | Kickstarter | Dec 7, 2013 | $30,000 | $34,250 | Music game where the player autoscrolls through the level's music sheet, dodging the notes. | May 6, 2016 | |
| Stasis | Christopher Bischoff | Kickstarter | Dec 7, 2013 | $100,000 | $132,523 | Point-and-click science fiction horror game presented in the isometric perspective. | Aug 31, 2015 | |
| Dyscourse | Owlchemy Labs | Kickstarter | Dec 6, 2013 | $40,000 | $44,134 | Survival adventure game focusing on stranded plane crash survivors. | Mar 25, 2015 | |
| The Mandate | Perihelion Interactive | Kickstarter | Dec 2, 2013 | $500,000 | $701,010 | Space opera role-playing video game featuring procedurally generated content. | TBA | |
| Ever, Jane | Judy L. Tyrer | Kickstarter | Dec 2, 2013 | $100,000 | $109,563 | Free-to-play MMORPG set in the Regency era, inspired by the works of Jane Austen. | Cancelled | |
| Paradise Lost: First Contact | Asthree Works | Kickstarter | Dec 1, 2013 | $70,000 | $144,960 | 2D science fiction action-adventure game, players control an alien life form trapped inside a research installation on Earth. | TBA | |
| Lords of Xulima | Numantian Games | Kickstarter | Nov 29, 2013 | $10,000 | $35,657 | Fantasy role-playing video game. | Nov 14, 2014 | |
| The Escapists | Mouldy Toof Studios | Kickstarter | Nov 28, 2013 | £3,000 | £7,131 | Puzzle role-playing video game, where players must escape a series of prisons. Mouldy Toof's second Kickstarter campaign after Spud's Quest in November 2012. | Feb 13, 2015 | |
| Drone | Evolution Controllers | Kickstarter | Nov 23, 2013 | $30,000 | $54,057 | Bluetooth game controller designed primarily for mobile devices. Second Kickstarter campaign for the controller, with a lowered target after the failure of the first campaign. Shipped to backers in March 2014. | Apr 2014 (began shipping) | |
| Secrets of Rætikon | Broken Rules | Indiegogo | Nov 22, 2013 | $20,000 | $13,612 | Flexible funding campaign. 2D action-adventure game. Players control a bird flying through and exploring the Alps. | Apr 17, 2014 | |
| Night in the Woods | Infinite Fall | Kickstarter | Nov 22, 2013 | $50,000 | $209,375 | 2D adventure game by Alec Holowka and Scott Benson. | Feb 21, 2017 | |
| Sentris | Samantha Kalman | Kickstarter | Nov 21, 2013 | $50,000 | $56,631 | Puzzle music video game. | Aug 12, 2015 | |
| Boogerman 20th Anniversary | Toy Ghost | Kickstarter | Nov 20, 2013 | $375,000 | $40,252 | HD sequel to 1994 Mega Drive side-scrolling action platform video game Boogerman: A Pick and Flick Adventure by the original creators. | Not funded | |
| Scale | Steve Swink | Kickstarter | Nov 16, 2013 | $87,000 | $108,020 | First-person puzzle video game, where players manipulate the size of objects in the game. | TBA | |
| Obduction | Cyan Worlds | Kickstarter | Nov 16, 2013 | $1,100,000 | $1,321,306 | First-person adventure game, spiritual successor to the Myst series by its original creators. | Aug 24, 2016 | |
| castAR | Technical Illusions | Kickstarter | Nov 14, 2013 | $400,000 | $1,052,110 | Augmented reality and virtual reality headset system designed by Jeri Ellsworth and Rick Johnson. Building upon technology spun out of Valve. The campaign video features Bre Pettis. Funds returned to backers in December 2015 following an external investment from Playground Global. | Cancelled | |
| Faeria | Abrakam | Kickstarter | Nov 10, 2013 | $70,000 | $94,008 | Turn-based strategy collectible card game video game. | Mar 8, 2017 | |
| ColecoVision | Rantmedia Games | Kickstarter | Nov 8, 2013 | $250,000 | $8,966 | Officially licensed ColecoVision emulator. | Not funded | |
| The Phoenix Project – City of Titans | Missing Worlds Media | Kickstarter | Nov 4, 2013 | $320,000 | $678,189 | MMORPG with a superhero theme. Spiritual successor to City of Heroes by members of its community. | TBA | |
| HuniePop | Ryan Koons | Kickstarter | Nov 1, 2013 | $20,000 | $53,536 | Pornographic match-3 dating sim. | Jan 19, 2015 | |
| RimWorld | Tynan Sylvester | Kickstarter | Nov 1, 2013 | C$20,000 | C$268,132 | Construction and management simulation science fiction video game set on an offworld colony. | Oct 17, 2018 | |
| Cosmic Star Heroine | Zeboyd Games | Kickstarter | Oct 31, 2013 | $100,000 | $132,689 | 2D science fiction role-playing video game inspired by the 16-bit era. Zeboyd Games' second Kickstarter campaign, after Cthulhu Saves the World in February 2011. | Apr 11, 2017 | |
| 0 A.D. | Wildfire Games | Indiegogo | Oct 20, 2013 | $160,000 | $33,251 | Flexible funding campaign. Open source historical real-time strategy video game. | TBA | |
| SC2VN | Team Eleven Eleven | Kickstarter | Oct 18, 2013 | $7,000 | $8,370 | Visual novel depicting an American eSports professional experiences in the South Korean Starcraft II scene. | Sep 7, 2015 | |
| Citizens of Earth | Eden Industries | Kickstarter | Oct 16, 2013 | C$100,000 | C$36,875 | RPG with comedic narrative. Despite failing its campaign goals, following a publishing deal with Atlus, the game was released in January 2015. | Jan 22, 2015 | |
| PrioVR | YEI Technology | Kickstarter | Oct 18, 2013 | $225,000 | $111,237 | Motion capture suit video game controller with support for virtual reality head-mounted displays. First Kickstarter campaign for the device. | Not funded | |
| The Long Dark | Hinterland | Kickstarter | Oct 16, 2013 | C$200,000 | C$256,217 | First-person survival video game set in a post-apocalyptic winter. | Aug 1, 2017 | |
| Contagion | Monochrome | Kickstarter | Oct 13, 2013 | $50,000 | $87,384 | First-person shooter zombie video game. Spiritual successor to Zombie Panic! Source by its original creator. | Apr 11, 2014 | |
| Hyper Light Drifter | Heart Machine | Kickstarter | Oct 12, 2013 | $27,000 | $645,158 | Action role-playing game combining elements of The Legend of Zelda: A Link to the Past and Diablo. | Mar 31, 2016 | |
| STEM System | Sixense | Kickstarter | Oct 12, 2013 | $250,000 | $604,978 | Motion sensing game controller for use with virtual reality head-mounted displays such as the Oculus Rift. An evolution of the technology which powered the Razer Hydra. | TBA | |
| River City Ransom: Underground | Conatus Creative | Kickstarter | Oct 9, 2013 | C$180,000 | C$217,643 | 2D role-playing beat 'em up video game and officially licensed follow-up to River City Ransom. | Feb 28, 2017 | |
| The Fall | Over The Moon | Kickstarter | Oct 9, 2013 | C$17,000 | C$38,155 | 2.5D science fiction action-adventure game. | May 30, 2014 | |
| Light | Just a Pixel | Kickstarter | Oct 6, 2013 | £20,000 | £5,673 | 2D top-down stealth game. The campaign was cancelled before its scheduled 10 October end date after receiving outside investment from Team17. | Jul 14, 2014 | |
| Shantae: Half-Genie Hero | WayForward | Kickstarter, Independent | Oct 4, 2013 | $400,000 | $947,937 | 2D action platformer video game and fourth entry in the Shantae series. Of the total amount, $776,084 was raised on Kickstarter. | Dec 20, 2016 | |
| Sunless Sea | Failbetter Games | Kickstarter | Oct 3, 2013 | £60,000 | £100,803 | 2D top-down survival and exploration game set in the Fallen London fictional universe. | Feb 6, 2015 | |
| Mighty No. 9 | Comcept | Kickstarter, Independent | Oct 1, 2013 | $900,000 | $4,031,550 | 2D action platformer video game by Mega Man creator, Keiji Inafune. Of the total amount, $3,845,171 was raised on Kickstarter. | Jun 21, 2016 | |
| The Mysterious Cities of Gold: Secret Paths | Ynnis Interactive | Kickstarter | Sep 30, 2013 | $30,000 | $46,680 | Puzzle adventure video game based on The Mysterious Cities of Gold TV series. Campaign to fund localisations outside its native French. | Nov 21, 2013 | |
| Neverending Nightmares | Matt Gilgenbach | Kickstarter | Sep 29, 2013 | $99,000 | $106,722 | Psychological horror video game with themes of mental illness. Part of Ouya's Free the Games fund matching scheme. | Sep 26, 2014 | |
| Man vs Snake | Andrew Seklir & Tim Kinzy | Kickstarter | Sep 21, 2013 | $53,470 | $61,440 | Documentary film project chronicling the competition to set the high score record on Nibbler. The campaign video features Walter Day and Billy Mitchell among others. Premiered at the 2015 Fantastic Fest. | Sep 27, 2015 | |
| Awesomenauts: Starstorm | Ronimo Games | Kickstarter, Independent | Sep 18, 2013 | $125,000 | $407,765 | Downloadable content for platformer-based MOBA. Ronimo turned to Kickstarter after the bankruptcy of the game's original publisher. Of the total amount, $345,835 was raised on Kickstarter. | Oct 16, 2014 | |
| Video Games Live: Level 3 | Tommy Tallarico | Kickstarter | Sep 13, 2013 | $250,000 | $285,081 | Third album of video game music by Video Games Live. | Feb 7, 2014 | |
| Project Phoenix | Creative Intelligence Arts | Kickstarter | Sep 11, 2013 | $100,000 | $1,014,600 | Japanese role-playing game with a squad based RTS game design, from veteran developers. Soundtrack by Nobuo Uematsu. | TBA | |
| StarCraft Universe | Upheaval Arts | Kickstarter | Sep 10, 2013 | $80,000 | $84,918 | MMORPG mod for StarCraft II. | Sep 5, 2016 | |
| Edo Superstar | Jed Henry | Kickstarter | Sep 5, 2013 | $65,000 | $67,764 | Role-playing fighting game featuring anthropomorphic characters in Japanese ukiyo-e style. Jed Henry's second Kickstarter project after Ukiyo-e Heroes in August 2012. | Feb 1, 2017 | |
| Paranautical Activity | Code Avarice | Kickstarter | Sep 3, 2013 | $10,000 | $12,540 | Roguelike first-person shooter. | Oct 20, 2014 | |
| Every Day is Play | Matthew Kenyon | Kickstarter | Sep 1, 2013 | £26,000 | £35,737 | Book project. Coffee table book celebrating the art, design and inspiration from video games. Featuring contributions by eBoy, Jamie Adenuga, and Wil Overton among others. | Sep 14, 2014 | |
| Fran Bow | Killmonday Games | Indiegogo | Aug 30, 2013 | $20,000 | $28,295 | Point-and-click adventure game with a horror theme. | Aug 27, 2015 | |
| Revolution 60 | Giant Spacekat | Kickstarter | Aug 30, 2013 | $5,000 | $12,728 | Action RPG science fiction video game. Campaign to bring the mobile game onto PC platforms. | Sep 6, 2016 | |
| Monochroma | Nowhere Studios | Kickstarter | Aug 24, 2013 | $80,000 | $84,644 | Puzzle platform video game set in a black and white dystopian world. | May 28, 2014 | |
| Shadow of the Eternals | Precursor Games | Kickstarter | Aug 23, 2013 | $750,000 | $323,950 | Survival horror video game, spiritual successor to Eternal Darkness: Sanity's Requiem by Denis Dyack and other members of the original team. Second crowdfunding campaign for the game with a lowered target after the failure of the first campaign. Project placed on indefinite hold in September 2013. | Cancelled | |
| Food Battle: The Game | Smosh | Indiegogo | Aug 23, 2013 | $250,000 | $259,247 | Flexible funding campaign. Action-adventure game based on Smosh's Food Battle video series. | Nov 19, 2014 | |
| Chroma Squad | Behold Studios | Kickstarter | Aug 21, 2013 | $55,000 | $97,148 | Tactical role-playing video game inspired by Super Sentai TV shows in a pixel art style. | Apr 30, 2015 | |
| Odallus: The Dark Call | JoyMasher | Indiegogo | Aug 18, 2013 | $5,000 | $7,533 | Flexible funding campaign. 2D action-adventure video game inspired by Castlevania and other games of the 8-bit era. | Jul 15, 2015 | |
| Gods Will Be Watching | Deconstructeam | Indiegogo | Aug 15, 2013 | €8,000 | €20,385 | Point-and-click adventure game with a focus on ethical dilemmas. Commercial remake and expansion of the free HTML5 original, which took second place in the Ludum Dare 26 game jam competition. Publisher Devolver Digital pledged to match the crowdfunding total in a publishing deal announced during the campaign. | Jul 24, 2014 | |
| 7 Days to Die | The Fun Pimps Entertainment | Kickstarter | Aug 15, 2013 | $200,000 | $507,612 | First-person shooter open world zombie survival game. | Jun 28, 2014 | |
| Project Ravensdale | Black Forest Games | Kickstarter | Aug 15, 2013 | $500,000 | $72,203 | 2.5D fantasy run and gun video game with co-operative multiplayer. The campaign was cancelled before its scheduled 17 August end date after it looked unlikely to succeed. First Kickstarter campaign for the game. Released as Rogue Stormers. | Apr 21, 2016 | |
| Tangiers | Alex Harvey | Kickstarter | Aug 14, 2013 | £35,000 | £42,006 | Stealth video game set in a dark fantasy world inspired by 20th century avant-garde. | TBA | |
| Yatagarasu Attack on Cataclysm | Yatagarasu Dev Team | Indiegogo | Aug 11, 2013 | $68,000 | $118,243 | Flexible funding campaign. Fighting game by former The King of Fighters developers. | Jul 7, 2015 | |
| Celestian Tales: Old North | Ekuator Games | Kickstarter | Aug 10, 2013 | $40,000 | $24,021 | Turn-based Japanese role-playing game. First Kickstarter campaign for the game. | Aug 11, 2015 | |
| Warmachine: Tactics | Privateer Press Interactive | Kickstarter | Aug 10, 2013 | $550,000 | $1,578,950 | Fantasy turn-based tactics video game set in the Warmachine universe. | Nov 20, 2014 | |
| Precinct | Jim Walls | Kickstarter | Aug 6, 2013 | $500,000 | $85,756 | Graphic adventure game. Spiritual successor to the Police Quest series; by Jim Walls and other members of the original team. The campaign was cancelled before its scheduled 16 August end date after it looked unlikely to succeed. | Not funded | |
| Liege | Coda Games | Kickstarter | Jul 28, 2013 | $15,000 | $81,458 | Tactical role-playing game inspired by the 16-bit era. | TBA | |
| Satellite Reign | 5 Lives Studios | Kickstarter | Jul 28, 2013 | £350,000 | £461,333 | Real-time strategy video game in a cyberpunk setting, by Syndicate Wars director, Mike Diskett. | Aug 28, 2015 | |
| Undertale | Toby Fox | Kickstarter | Jul 24, 2013 | $5,000 | $51,124 | Role-playing game. | Sep 15, 2015 | |
| Omni | Virtuix | Kickstarter | Jul 22, 2013 | $150,000 | $1,109,351 | Omnidirectional treadmill-like device for use with virtual reality head-mounted displays such as the Oculus Rift. Backers from outside the United States had their pledges refunded after the international release was cancelled in 2016. | Jan 31, 2017 (began shipping) | |
| Pinball Arcade: Terminator 2 Judgment Day | FarSight Studios | Kickstarter | Jul 21, 2013 | $59,000 | $62,360 | Digitising and licensing Terminator 2: Judgment Day for The Pinball Arcade. | Aug 31, 2013 | |
| Megatokyo Visual Novel Game | Fred Gallagher | Kickstarter | Jul 18, 2013 | $20,000 | $299,184 | Visual novel based on the Megatokyo webcomic. | TBA | |
| The Question Block Lamp | 8-Bit Lit | Kickstarter | Jul 18, 2013 | $100,000 | $131,479 | Light fixture inspired by the Question Block of the Super Mario series. | 2013 | |
| Dark Matter | Interwave Studios | Kickstarter | Jul 18, 2013 | £50,000 | £6,227 | 2.5D science fiction action-adventure game. Following the campaign's failure, Interwave laid off the development team. Released as a truncated version in October 2013. | Oct 17, 2013 | |
| Frontiers | Lars Simkins | Kickstarter | Jul 17, 2013 | $50,000 | $157,381 | First-person open world fantasy role-playing video game with a focus on exploration. Second crowdfunding campaign for the game, on Kickstarter instead of Indiegogo, and with a lowered target after the failure of the first campaign. | TBA | |
| Soul Saga | Disastercake | Kickstarter | Jul 15, 2013 | $60,000 | $195,528 | 3D RPG inspired by the PlayStation era. | TBA | |
| Ozombie | Spicy Horse | Kickstarter | Jul 14, 2013 | $950,000 | $141,513 | Action-adventure game set in the Oz universe; from American McGee's Spicy Horse studio. Renamed to Oz Action Adventure. The campaign was cancelled before its scheduled 5 August end date after it looked unlikely to succeed. As Kickstarter only allows creators to run one campaign at a time, this freed Spicy Horse to launch a campaign for the film rights to Alice: Otherlands. The film rights were only available within a short window of time, whereas Ozombie could be pursued at a later date. | Cancelled | |
| H-Hour: World's Elite | David Sears | Kickstarter | Jul 7, 2013 | $200,000 | $252,662 | Tactical first-person shooter. Spiritual successor to the SOCOM series, by its former creative director. | Feb 17, 2020 | |
| Tobuscus Adventures: Wizards! | Toby Turner | Indiegogo | Jul 5, 2013 | $240,000 | $642,416 | Flexible funding campaign. Video game based on Toby Turner's Tobuscus video series. | Mar 19, 2015 | |
| Boss Fight Books | Gabe Durham | Kickstarter | Jul 2, 2013 | $5,000 | $45,429 | Book project, launching a series of books on video games in the style of 33⅓. The first season of books are, EarthBound by Ken Baumann, Galaga by Michael Kimball, ZZT by Anna Anthropy, Super Mario Bros. 2 by Jon Irwin, and Jagged Alliance 2 by Darius Kazemi. | Jan 15, 2014 (first book) | |
| A Vampyre Story: Year One | Autumn Moon Entertainment | Kickstarter | Jul 1, 2013 | $200,000 | $77,413 | Graphic adventure game by Bill Tiller, prequel to A Vampyre Story. | Not funded | |
| The Untold History of Japanese Game Developers | John Szczepaniak | Kickstarter | Jun 30, 2013 | £50,000 | £70,092 | Book project chronicling the history of Japanese video games through interviews with their developers. | Aug 26, 2014 | |
| ARAIG | ARAIG | Kickstarter | Jun 30, 2013 | $900,000 | $126,625 | Force feedback and electrical muscle stimulation wearable device for use with video games. | Not funded | |
| A Hat in Time | Gears for Breakfast | Kickstarter | Jun 28, 2013 | $30,000 | $296,360 | 3D platform game inspired by Nintendo 64 era video games such as Super Mario 64 and Banjo-Kazooie. | Oct 5, 2017 | |
| Massive Chalice | Double Fine Productions | Kickstarter | Jun 27, 2013 | $725,000 | $1,229,015 | Fantasy turn-based tactics video game. | Jun 1, 2015 | |
| Armikrog | Pencil Test Studios | Kickstarter | Jun 27, 2013 | $900,000 | $974,578 | Graphic adventure game. Spiritual successor to clay-animation-based The Neverhood; by Doug TenNapel and other members of the original team. | Sep 30, 2015 | |
| Unrest | Pyrodactyl Games | Kickstarter | Jun 27, 2013 | $3,000 | $36,251 | Role-playing video game set in ancient India in the midst of an uprising. | Jul 23, 2014 | |
| Video Games: The Movie | Mediajuice Studios | Kickstarter | Jun 18, 2013 | $60,000 | $107,235 | Documentary film project chronicling video game history and culture. The film's second crowdfunding drive was for post-production costs. | Jul 15, 2014 | |
| Pixel Press | Roundthird | Kickstarter | Jun 14, 2013 | $100,000 | $108,950 | Mobile app converting pen and paper designs into playable 2D platform games. | Apr 30, 2014 | |
| Spintires | Oovee Game Studios | Kickstarter | Jun 13, 2013 | £40,000 | £60,935 | Off-road driving simulator. | Jun 13, 2014 | |
| Frontiers | Lars Simkins | Indiegogo | Jun 10, 2013 | $80,000 | $10,356 | First-person open world fantasy role-playing video game with a focus on exploration. First crowdfunding campaign for the game. The campaign was cancelled before its scheduled 1 July end date after it looked unlikely to succeed. | Not funded | |
| Energy Hook | Happion Laboratories | Kickstarter | Jun 9, 2013 | $1 | $41,535 | Action video game with a rope swinging mechanic by Spider-Man 2's technical director. $1 target set to emulate a flexible funding campaign. | Jul 5, 2016 | |
| Hex: Shards of Fate | Cryptozoic Entertainment | Kickstarter | Jun 7, 2013 | $300,000 | $2,278,255 | MMO fantasy digital collectible card game. | Jan 26, 2016 | |
| Delta Six | David Kotkin | Kickstarter | Jun 7, 2013 | $100,000 | $198,185 | Gun shaped game controller with motion sensing capabilities, built on the Arduino platform. Second Kickstarter campaign for the controller, with a lowered target after the failure of the first campaign. | TBA | |
| Shadow of the Eternals | Precursor Games | Kickstarter, Independent | Jun 6, 2013 | $1,350,000 | $284,000 | Survival horror video game, spiritual successor to Eternal Darkness: Sanity's Requiem by Denis Dyack and other members of the original team. The campaign was cancelled prior to its scheduled 19 June end date. First crowdfunding campaign for the game. Of the total amount, $128,039 was raised on Kickstarter. | Not funded | |
| The Stomping Land | Alex Fundora | Kickstarter | Jun 6, 2013 | $20,000 | $114,060 | Multiplayer open world survival game in a prehistoric world populated with dinosaurs. | Cancelled | |
| Downloadable Content: The Return | Penny Arcade | Kickstarter | May 31, 2013 | $10 | $230,360 | Reviving Penny Arcade's Downloadable Content series of podcasts. $10 target set to emulate a flexible funding campaign. Penny Arcade's second Kickstarter project, after Penny Arcade Sells Out in August 2012. | 2013 | |
| Sissyfight 2000 Returns | Team Sissyfight | Kickstarter | May 31, 2013 | $20,000 | $22,735 | Multiplayer turn-based strategy video game. Freely licensed HTML5 remake of the original. | TBA | |
| Tug | Nerd Kingdom | Kickstarter | May 31, 2013 | $215,000 | $293,184 | Open world fantasy role-playing video game with crafting elements. | TBA | |
| Stonehearth | Radiant Entertainment | Kickstarter | May 30, 2013 | $120,000 | $751,920 | Fantasy real-time strategy video game with mod support. | Jul 25, 2018 | |
| Jagged Alliance: Flashback | Full Control | Kickstarter | May 23, 2013 | $350,000 | $368,614 | Tactical role-playing game, prequel to the original Jagged Alliance. | Oct 21, 2014 | |
| The Realm | Atomhawk Design & Lantern Interactive | Kickstarter | May 22, 2013 | £195,000 | £94,527 | Point-and-click adventure game in a future fantasy setting. Following the campaign's failure on Kickstarter's UK platform, Atomhawk vowed a follow-up campaign using Kickstarter's American platform and its broader payment options. | Not funded | |
| Guns of Icarus Online – Adventure Mode | Muse Games | Kickstarter | May 21, 2013 | $100,000 | $198,741 | Steampunk team-based multiplayer airship combat video game. Spiritual successor to Guns of Icarus. Second successful Kickstarter campaign for the game, contributing towards the Adventure Mode expansion pack. | Mar 31, 2017 | |
| Ghost of a Tale | Lionel Gallat | Indiegogo | May 20, 2013 | €45,000 | €48,700 | Action-adventure game from Lionel Gallat, the animation director of Despicable Me. | Mar 13, 2018 | |
| GHOSTS | Visible Games | Kickstarter | May 8, 2021 | £165,000 | £183,246 | Interactive movie horror video game. | TBA | |
| Among the Sleep | Krillbite Studio | Kickstarter | May 18, 2013 | $200,000 | $248,358 | First-person survival horror video game seen through the eyes of a child. | May 29, 2014 | |
| DreadOut | Digital Happiness | Indiegogo | May 15, 2013 | $25,000 | $29,067 | Flexible funding campaign. First-person survival horror video game set in the developer's native Indonesia. First act released in May 2014, second and final act released in February 2015. | May 15, 2014 | |
| Road Redemption | DarkSeas Games | Kickstarter, Independent | May 12, 2013 | $160,000 | $182,791 | Vehicular combat motorcycle racing video game inspired by the Road Rash series. Of the total amount, $173,803 was raised on Kickstarter. | Oct 4, 2017 | |
| Chasm | Discord Games | Kickstarter | May 12, 2013 | $150,000 | $191,897 | 2D platform adventure game featuring procedurally generated Metroid-like dungeons in a pixel art style. | Jul 31, 2018 | |
| C-Wars | Onipunks | Kickstarter | May 11, 2013 | $32,000 | $95,574 | Roguelike science fiction real-time strategy video game with a pixel art style. | TBA | |
| GTFO | Shannon Sun-Higginson | Kickstarter | May 10, 2013 | $20,000 | $33,706 | Documentary film project examining sexism in video gaming. Premiered at the 2015 South by Southwest festival. | Mar 14, 2015 | |
| Risk of Rain | hopoo | Kickstarter | May 8, 2013 | $7,000 | $30,480 | Roguelike science fiction platform game. | Nov 8, 2013 | |
| Camelot Unchained | City State Entertainment | Kickstarter | May 2, 2013 | $2,000,000 | $2,232,933 | MMORPG featuring realm versus realm mechanics. The success of the Kickstarter allowed City State Entertainment to secure an additional $3M of private funding. | TBA | |
| Battle Worlds: Kronos | King Art Games | Kickstarter | Apr 28, 2013 | $120,000 | $260,235 | Turn-based strategy video game. | Nov 4, 2013 | |
| Divinity: Original Sin | Larian Studios | Kickstarter | Apr 26, 2013 | $400,000 | $944,282 | Role-playing video game, prequel to Divine Divinity. | Jun 30, 2014 | |
| From Bedrooms to Billions | Nicola Caulfield & Anthony Caulfield | Kickstarter | Apr 26, 2013 | £18,000 | £60,550 | Documentary film project chronicling the history of the UK video game industry. Second successful crowdfunding campaign for the film, contributing towards post-production costs. Premiered at the 2014 EGX. | Oct 3, 2014 | |
| Buddy & Me | Sunbreak Games | Kickstarter | Apr 20, 2013 | $40,000 | $42,093 | Endless runner video game. | Sep 25, 2013 | |
| Consortium | Interdimensional Games | Kickstarter | Apr 18, 2013 | $50,000 | $70,435 | First-person science fiction role-playing video game with a fourth wall breaking narrative. Second Kickstarter campaign for the game, with a lowered target after the failure of the first campaign. | Jan 8, 2014 | |
| Shovel Knight | Yacht Club Games | Kickstarter | Apr 13, 2013 | $75,000 | $311,502 | 2D action platformer video game inspired by Mega Man and other games of the 8-bit era. | Jun 26, 2014 | |
| J.U.L.I.A. Enhanced Edition | CBE Software | Indiegogo | Apr 12, 2013 | $5,000 | $14,120 | Adventure game. Enhanced remake of the 2012 science fiction video game J.U.L.I.A. by its original developers. Released as J.U.L.I.A. Among the Stars. | Oct 12, 2014 | |
| Pulse | Team Pixel Pi | Kickstarter | Apr 12, 2013 | $75,000 | $80,977 | First-person survival video game featuring a blind protagonist navigating the world through echolocation. | Oct 20, 2015 | |
| Shroud of the Avatar: Forsaken Virtues | Portalarium | Kickstarter, Independent | Apr 7, 2013 | $1,000,000 | $11,813,841 | Fantasy role-playing video game by Richard Garriott. Of the total amount, $1,919,275 was raised on Kickstarter. | Mar 27, 2018 | |
| SoundSelf | Robin Arnott | Kickstarter | Apr 7, 2013 | $29,060 | $36,766 | Interactive sound visualisation responding to the player's chants. | TBA | |
| Torment: Tides of Numenera | inXile entertainment | Kickstarter, Independent | Apr 5, 2013 | $900,000 | $4,188,927 | Fantasy role-playing video game. Succeeded Project Eternity as the highest funded Kickstarter video game. Was succeeded by Bloodstained: Ritual of the Night in June 2015. Including private backers, the project raised over $4.5M. | Feb 28, 2017 | |
| Keep Skullgirls Growing | Lab Zero Games | Indiegogo | Mar 27, 2013 | $150,000 | $828,768 | Campaign to fund extra characters as downloadable content for the Skullgirls video game. Achieving the $725,000 stretch goal gave the Fighting Is Magic team a free license of Lab Zero's Z-Engine. | Aug 2013 (first character) | |
| Mage's Initiation: Reign of the Elements | Himalaya Studios | Kickstarter | Mar 23, 2013 | $65,000 | $125,174 | Adventure and action RPG hybrid where players take on the role of an apprentice mage. | Jan 30, 2019 | |
| There Came an Echo | Iridium Studios | Kickstarter | Mar 21, 2013 | $90,000 | $115,569 | Voice-controlled real-time strategy game starring Wil Wheaton. Iridium Studios' second Kickstarter campaign after Before the Echo (formerly Sequence) in 2010. | Feb 24, 2015 | |
| Train Fever | Urban Games | Gambitious | Mar 20, 2013 | €250,000 | €250,000 | Equity crowdfunding campaign. 50% of the game's revenue will be returned to backers. The campaign was closed on reaching its target amount, before its scheduled 31 March end date. Railroad-focused business simulation game. | Sep 4, 2014 | |
| RIOT: Civil Unrest | Team Riot | Indiegogo | Mar 16, 2013 | $15,000 | $36,139 | Flexible funding campaign. Riot simulation video game inspired by real events. | Feb 12, 2019 | |
| Back to Bed | Bedtime Digital Games | Kickstarter | Mar 16, 2013 | $12,000 | $13,312 | Puzzle video game set in a surrealist dreamscape. | Aug 6, 2014 | |
| Throw Trucks With Your Mind! | Lat Ware | Kickstarter | Mar 14, 2013 | $40,000 | $47,287 | First-person shooter video game controlled using a NeuroSky brain–computer interface device. | Mar 31, 2014 | |
| Dreamfall Chapters: The Longest Journey | Red Thread Games | Kickstarter | Mar 10, 2013 | $850,000 | $1,538,425 | Episodic adventure game, third game in The Longest Journey series. | Oct 21, 2014 (first episode) | |
| At the Gates | Conifer Games | Kickstarter | Mar 8, 2013 | $40,000 | $106,283 | Turn-based strategy video game designed by Jon Shafer. Players control a barbarian tribe during the decline of the Roman Empire. | Jan 23, 2019 | |
| Race the Sun | Flippfly | Kickstarter | Mar 7, 2013 | $20,000 | $21,579 | Endless runner video game. | Aug 19, 2013 | |
| Death Inc. | Ambient Studios | Kickstarter | Mar 6, 2013 | £300,000 | £122,711 | Real-time strategy video game, players assume the role of the Grim Reaper. Following the campaign's failure, Ambient Studios attempted to raise funds by selling alpha access to the game. This too failed to raise the necessary funds, and Ambient Studios shut down in April 2013. | Not funded | |
| Factorio | Tomas Kozelek, Marwin Kovarex, Kasia Mazurek | Indiegogo | Mar 3, 2013 | €17,000 | €21,626 | Real-time strategy science fiction video game. Players must gather resources and build factories on an alien world. | Aug 14, 2020 | |
| Monsters Ate My Birthday Cake | SleepNinja Games | Kickstarter | Feb 16, 2013 | $15,000 | $26,096 | Puzzle adventure video game. | Jul 1, 2014 | |
| Freedom Planet | GalaxyTrail / Strife | Kickstarter | Feb 14, 2013 | $2,000 | $25,472 | 2D platform game inspired by the 16-bit era. | Jul 21, 2014 | |
| Unwritten: That Which Happened | Roxlou Games | Kickstarter | Feb 13, 2013 | $75,000 | $78,017 | Turn-based strategy video game with story elements. Originally scheduled for an August 2013 release. In January 2014, it was announced that game development would continue only as a side project with an undetermined release date. | TBA | |
| Wildman | Gas Powered Games | Kickstarter | Feb 11, 2013 | $1,100,000 | $504,120 | Action RPG designed by Chris Taylor. The campaign was cancelled before its scheduled 15 February end date after it looked unlikely to succeed. On 14 February, Gas Powered Games were acquired by Wargaming. | Not funded | |
| Neocolonialism | Subaltern Games | Kickstarter | Feb 3, 2013 | $10,000 | $11,049 | Turn-based strategy video game and critique of neoliberal economics. | Nov 4, 2013 | |
| Akaneiro: Demon Hunters | Spicy Horse | Kickstarter | Feb 2, 2013 | $200,000 | $204,680 | Free-to-play action RPG inspired by Little Red Riding Hood and Japanese mythology from American McGee's Spicy Horse studio. | Jan 31, 2013 | |
| GameStick | PlayJam | Kickstarter | Feb 1, 2013 | $100,000 | $647,658 | Android based video game console. Shipped to backers in August 2013. | Nov 15, 2013 | |
| GCW Zero | Justin Barwick | Kickstarter | Jan 29, 2013 | $130,000 | $238,498 | Linux based handheld game console. | Aug 2013 (began shipping) | |
| Radio the Universe | 6e6e6e | Kickstarter | Jan 24, 2013 | $12,000 | $81,719 | Action role-playing game inspired by the 16-bit era in a dark fantasy science fiction setting. | TBA | |
| Coming Out on Top | Obscura | Kickstarter | Jan 21, 2013 | $5,000 | $38,601 | Pornographic dating game featuring exclusively gay male relationships. | Dec 11, 2014 | |
| Legends of Dawn | Aurofinity & Dreamatrix | Kickstarter | Jan 18, 2013 | $25,000 | $46,536 | Open world fantasy role-playing video game. | Jun 27, 2013 | |
| Pathfinder Online | Goblinworks | Kickstarter | Jan 14, 2013 | $1,000,000 | $1,091,194 | MMORPG in the Pathfinder Roleplaying Game universe. Second successful Kickstarter campaign for the game, contributing towards the full version. | Cancelled | |
| Full Bore | Whole Hog Games | Kickstarter | Jan 13, 2013 | $12,500 | $16,383 | 2D puzzle platform video game. | May 6, 2014 | |
| Maia | Simon Roth | Indiegogo | Jan 6, 2013 | $500 | $11,435 | Space colony management game, inspired by Dungeon Keeper and Dwarf Fortress. Second successful crowdfunding campaign for the game. Supplement to the original Kickstarter campaign, using Indiegogo to accept pledges via PayPal. Despite meeting the $500 goal, no further stretch targets were realised. | Nov 23, 2018 | |
| Elite: Dangerous | Frontier Developments | Kickstarter | Jan 4, 2013 | £1,250,000 | £1,578,316 | Space trading and combat simulator, fourth game in the Elite series. Highest funding goal to be successfully met on Kickstarter. | Dec 16, 2014 | |
| Phonejoy Play | Phonejoy | Kickstarter | Jan 3, 2013 | $50,000 | $69,859 | Bluetooth game controller designed primarily for mobile devices. | Apr 2014 | |
| War for the Overworld | Subterranean Games | Kickstarter | Jan 3, 2013 | £150,000 | £211,371 | Real-time strategy video game inspired by Dungeon Keeper. | Apr 2, 2015 | |
| The Ship: Full Steam Ahead | Blazing Griffin | Kickstarter | Dec 30, 2012 | £128,000 | £18,247 | Steampunk first-person shooter video game. Sequel to The Ship by members of the original team. | Not funded | |
| Barkley 2 | Tale of Game's Studios | Kickstarter | Dec 28, 2012 | $35,000 | $120,335 | Comedic action role-playing game. Sequel to the freeware video game Barkley, Shut Up and Jam: Gaiden. | Cancelled | |
| Richard & Alice | Owl Cave | Indiegogo | Dec 23, 2012 | $2,000 | $2,000 | Flexible funding campaign. Point-and-click adventure game set in a post-apocalyptic future. | Feb 21, 2013 | |
| Limit Theory | Josh Parnell | Kickstarter | Dec 22, 2012 | $50,000 | $187,865 | Space trading and combat simulator featuring procedurally generated universes. | Cancelled | |
| The Last Door | Alejo AC | Kickstarter | Dec 21, 2012 | £3,852 | £4,690 | Episodic adventure game inspired by the works of HP Lovecraft and Edgar Allan Poe. | Mar 11, 2013 (First Episode) | |
| Dizzy Returns | The Oliver Twins | Kickstarter | Dec 21, 2012 | £350,000 | £25,620 | Puzzle platform video game. Tenth game in the Dizzy series. | Not funded | |
| Godus | 22cans | Kickstarter | Dec 21, 2012 | £450,000 | £526,563 | God game designed by Peter Molyneux. | Aug 7, 2014 | |
| Legend of Dungeon | RobotLovesKitty | Kickstarter | Dec 16, 2012 | $5,000 | $32,999 | Roguelike fantasy beat 'em up video game with co-operative multiplayer. | Sep 13, 2013 | |
| Consortium | Interdimensional Games | Kickstarter | Dec 18, 2012 | $200,000 | $9,667 | First-person science fiction role-playing video game with a fourth wall breaking narrative. The campaign was cancelled before its scheduled 31 December end date. First Kickstarter campaign for the game. | Jan 8, 2014 | |
| Retro Game Crunch | Shaun Inman | Kickstarter | Dec 12, 2012 | $60,000 | $66,694 | Compilation of six retro inspired video games. First game released to backers in February 2013. Complete compilation released in March 2014. | Mar 4, 2014 | |
| Fist of Awesome | Nicoll Hunt | Kickstarter | Dec 10, 2012 | £5,000 | £11,808 | 2D beat 'em up video game in a pixel art style. | Oct 15, 2013 | |
| Sportsfriends | Die Gute Fabrik | Kickstarter | Dec 10, 2012 | $150,000 | $152,451 | Compilation of the local multiplayer video games, Johann Sebastian Joust, Riders, BaraBariBall, and Hokra. | May 6, 2014 | |
| LA Game Space | LA Game Space | Kickstarter | Dec 7, 2012 | $250,000 | $335,657 | Nonprofit physical space in Los Angeles dedicated to video games research, development, talks, and exhibitions. | Cancelled | |
| Pier Solar HD | WaterMelon | Kickstarter | Dec 5, 2012 | $139,000 | $231,370 | HD remake of 2010 Mega Drive RPG video game Pier Solar and the Great Architects. | Sep 30, 2014 | |
| Kung Fu Superstar | Kinesthetic Games | Kickstarter | Dec 4, 2012 | £200,000 | £94,010 | Motion controlled kung fu video game for Windows. The campaign video featured Peter Molyneux's support. Following the campaign's failure, the development team disbanded. | Not funded | |
| Sir, You Are Being Hunted | Big Robot | Kickstarter | Dec 2, 2012 | £40,000 | £92,551 | First-person shooter open world survival video game. | May 1, 2014 | |
| Alpha Colony | DreamQuest Games | Kickstarter | Dec 2, 2012 | $50,000 | $49,972 | Strategy video game inspired by M.U.L.E. and The Settlers of Catan. Second Kickstarter campaign for the game, with a lowered target after the failure of the first campaign. Campaign finished $28 short, highlighting the risks of Kickstarter's all-or-nothing style campaigns. | Not funded | |
| Forced | BetaDwarf | Kickstarter | Dec 1, 2012 | $40,000 | $65,413 | Fantasy top-down action game with co-operative multiplayer. | Oct 24, 2013 | |
| Sui Generis | Bare Mettle Entertainment | Kickstarter | Nov 29, 2012 | £150,000 | £160,055 | Open world fantasy role-playing video game. | TBA | |
| Nevermind (Round 2) | Erin Reynolds | Indiegogo | Nov 29, 2012 | $3,000 | $1,161 | Flexible funding campaign. Survival horror video game with dynamic difficulty based on biofeedback. Second Indiegogo campaign for the game. | Sep 29, 2015 | |
| StarForge | CodeHatch | Indiegogo | Nov 29, 2012 | $75,000 | $135,453 | Open world science fiction survival video game. | Sep 18, 2014 | |
| Maia | Simon Roth | Kickstarter | Nov 28, 2012 | £100,042 | £140,481 | Space colony management game, inspired by Dungeon Keeper and Dwarf Fortress. First successful crowdfunding campaign for the game. | Nov 23, 2018 | |
| Shadowgate | Zojoi | Kickstarter | Nov 25, 2012 | $120,000 | $137,232 | Graphic adventure game. Enhanced remake of the 1987 fantasy video game Shadowgate by members of the original team. | Aug 21, 2014 | |
| Hero-U: Rogue to Redemption | The Coles | Kickstarter | Nov 20, 2012 | $400,000 | $409,150 | Fantasy turn-based RPG with adventure game elements by the designers of the Quest for Glory series. | Jul 9, 2018 | |
| Star Citizen | Cloud Imperium Games | Kickstarter, Independent, Early Access sales since 2016 | Nov 19, 2012 | $500,000 | $174,349,422 (crowdfunded amount until start of Early Access release in December 2017, see notes) | Space combat video game from Chris Roberts, designer of Wing Commander. Of the total amount, $2,134,374 was raised on Kickstarter. Crowdfunding options remained open after the campaign. Official statements from the developer confirm the game was released in Early Access in 2017. At the end of 2017 the developer had raised $174M through crowdfunding. Since then, the developer has not stated a clear split of crowdfund based revenues and straight Early Access sales so the total crowdfund figure is unclear. As of 7 December 2024, the developer alleges a total of $764,245,320 has been raised, which includes both crowdfund and Early Access sales. | Dec 23, 2017 (early access) | |
| Strike Suit Zero | Born Ready Games | Kickstarter | Nov 17, 2012 | $100,000 | $174,804 | Mecha based space combat video game. | Jan 23, 2013 | |
| Distance | Refract Studios | Kickstarter | Nov 16, 2012 | $125,000 | $161,981 | Futuristic arcade racing video game by members of the Nitronic Rush team. The campaign video features support from Aaron Hightower – lead programmer on the arcade version of San Francisco Rush 2049, and Cliff Bleszinski. | Sep 18, 2018 | |
| Project CARS | World of Mass Development | Independent | Nov 11, 2012 | $3.1M | $3,142,808 | Racing simulation video game by Slightly Mad Studios due to be released in November 2014. Note that Slightly Mad Studios themselves also contributed $2,072,400 to the overall funding for the game, amount raised is the total of public funding only. | May 6, 2013 | |
| Delta Six | David Kotkin | Kickstarter | Nov 1, 2012 | $500,000 | $73,449 | Gun shaped game controller with motion sensing capabilities, built on the Arduino platform. The campaign was cancelled before its scheduled 17 November end date. First Kickstarter campaign for the controller. | Cancelled | |
| Shaker | Loot Drop | Kickstarter | Oct 23, 2012 | $1,000,000 | $244,932 | Initially named Old-School RPG, the campaign was cancelled prior to its scheduled 4 November end date by its creators Brenda Brathwaite and Tom Hall. | Cancelled | |
| Project Eternity | Obsidian Entertainment | Kickstarter, Independent | Oct 16, 2012 | $1,100,000 | $3,986,929 | Fantasy role-playing video game. Succeeded Double Fine Adventure as the highest funded Kickstarter video game. Was succeeded by Torment: Tides of Numenera in April 2013. Including private backers, the project raised over $4.5M. Released as Pillars of Eternity. | Mar 26, 2015 | |
| Sensible Software 1986–1999 | Darren Wall | Kickstarter | Oct 7, 2012 | $30,000 | $39,493 | Book project chronicling the history of Sensible Software. | Oct 2013 | |
| Homestuck Adventure Game | MS Paint Adventures | Kickstarter | Oct 4, 2012 | $700,000 | $2,485,506 | Adventure game based on the Homestuck webcomic. Succeeded The Order of the Stick as the highest funded comic related Kickstarter project. Released as Hiveswap. | Sep 14, 2017 (first episode) | |
| Nexus 2: The Gods Awaken | Most Wanted Entertainment | Kickstarter | Sep 28, 2012 | $650,000 | $161,731 | Real-time tactics and space combat simulator game. Sequel to Nexus: The Jupiter Incident from Mithis Entertainment. Like the first campaign for the game, this second campaign ended in failure. | Not funded | |
| Broken Sword: The Serpent's Curse | Revolution Software | Kickstarter | Sep 22, 2012 | $400,000 | $771,560 | Graphic adventure game. Fifth game in the Broken Sword series. | Dec 4, 2013 – Jun 20, 2014 | |
| Pinball Arcade: Star Trek The Next Generation | FarSight Studios | Kickstarter | Sep 16, 2012 | $45,000 | $52,137 | Digitising and licensing Star Trek: The Next Generation for The Pinball Arcade. | Feb 25, 2013 | |
| Chivalry: Medieval Warfare | Torn Banner Studios | Kickstarter | Sep 15, 2012 | $50,000 | $85,934 | First-person melee combat video game. First commercial project from the Age of Chivalry mod team. | Oct 16, 2012 | |
| Planetary Annihilation | Uber Entertainment | Kickstarter | Sep 14, 2012 | $900,000 | $2,229,344 | Real-time strategy video game by members of the Total Annihilation team. | Sep 5, 2014 | |
| Mercenary Kings | Tribute Games | Kickstarter | Sep 13, 2012 | $75,000 | $116,064 | 2D run and gun video game with co-operative multiplayer. Artwork by Paul Robertson. | Mar 25, 2014 | |
| Expeditions: Conquistador | Logic Artists | Kickstarter | Sep 12, 2012 | $70,000 | $77,247 | Tactical role-playing game set during the Age of Exploration. The player leads a Spanish expedition to Hispaniola and Mexico. | May 30, 2013 | |
| Knock-Knock | Ice-Pick Lodge | Kickstarter | Sep 11, 2012 | $30,000 | $41,021 | 2D survival horror adventure game. | Oct 4, 2013 | |
| SolForge | Stone Blade Entertainment | Kickstarter | Sep 11, 2012 | $250,000 | $429,715 | Fantasy digital collectible card game designed by Justin Gary and Richard Garfield, designer of Magic: The Gathering. | May 31, 2016 | |
| Insurgency 2 | New World Interactive | Kickstarter | Sep 8, 2012 | $180,000 | $66,582 | First-person shooter, commercial sequel to the free Insurgency: Modern Infantry Combat mod. Despite failing its campaign goals, New World Interactive raised funds through Steam Early Access and the game was released in January 2014 as Insurgency. | Jan 22, 2014 | |
| Oculus Rift | Oculus VR | Kickstarter | Sep 1, 2012 | $250,000 | $2,437,429 | Virtual reality head-mounted display designed for gaming. The campaign video featured support from several notable video game industry figures. Development units began shipping in March 2013. Kickstarter backers such as Notch criticised Oculus VR's sale of the company to Facebook in 2014. | Mar 29, 2013 (Development units) | |
| Project Giana | Black Forest Games | Kickstarter | Aug 31, 2012 | $150,000 | $186,158 | 2.5D platform game. Sequel to The Great Giana Sisters and Giana Sisters DS. Released as Giana Sisters: Twisted Dreams. | Oct 23, 2012 | |
| GaymerCon | GaymerCon | Kickstarter | Aug 31, 2012 | $25,000 | $91,388 | Gaymer convention in San Francisco, renamed to GaymerX due to a trademark dispute. Held over two days in August 2013. | Aug 2013 | |
| Ukiyo-e Heroes | Jed Henry | Kickstarter | Aug 31, 2012 | $10,400 | $313,341 | Ukiyo-e style Japanese woodblock prints inspired by video game characters. Highest funded illustration project on Kickstarter. | Nov 5, 2012 (began shipping) | |
| Balance of the Planet | Chris Crawford | Kickstarter | Aug 29, 2012 | $150,000 | $13,594 | Educational video game to teach players about environmental concerns. Update to Crawford's 1990 video game of the same name. Achieving the Kickstarter target would have enabled the game to be given away for free, but the campaign was a "dismal failure" according to its creator. | Not funded | |
| Castle Story | Sauropod Studio | Kickstarter | Aug 26, 2012 | $80,000 | $702,516 | Real-time strategy castle building video game. | Aug 17, 2017 | |
| Volgarr the Viking | Crazy Viking Studios | Kickstarter | Aug 23, 2012 | $18,000 | $39,964 | 2D action platform video game inspired by the 16-bit era. | Sep 11, 2013 | |
| Steam Bandits: Outpost | Iocaine Studios | Kickstarter | Aug 19, 2012 | $30,000 | $55,362 | Free-to-play steampunk city-building video game. | TBA | |
| From Bedrooms to Billions | Nicola Caulfield & Anthony Caulfield | Indiegogo | Aug 17, 2012 | $35,000 | $37,027 | Documentary film project chronicling the history of the UK video game industry. First successful crowdfunding campaign for the film, contributing towards production costs. | Oct 3, 2014 | |
| Penny Arcade Sells Out | Penny Arcade | Kickstarter | Aug 15, 2012 | $250,000 | $528,144 | Campaign to remove online advertising from the Penny Arcade webcomic. The stretch goal attained allowed for all home page adverts to be removed for one year. | Aug 2012 | |
| Shadowrun Online | Cliffhanger Productions | Kickstarter | Aug 14, 2012 | $500,000 | $558,863 | MMORPG in the Shadowrun universe, not to be confused with Shadowrun Returns. Released as Shadowrun Chronicles: Boston Lockdown. | Apr 28, 2015 | |
| Defense Grid 2 | Hidden Path Entertainment | Kickstarter | Aug 14, 2012 | $250,000 | $271,726 | Tower defense video game. Despite meeting the initial goal of $250,000, this only provided funding for a Defense Grid: The Awakening expansion pack. The full sequel would have required the $1,000,000 stretch goal. The funding shortfall was met in 2013 allowing Defense Grid 2 to proceed. | Sep 23, 2014 | |
| Video Games: The Movie | Mediajuice Studios | Indiegogo | Aug 10, 2012 | $107,550 | $1,790 | Flexible funding campaign. Documentary film project chronicling video game history and culture. Despite failing to meet their campaign goals, Mediajuice received funds raised. Filming still managed to proceed. | Jun 15, 2014 | |
| Ouya | Ouya | Kickstarter | Aug 9, 2012 | $950,000 | $8,596,474 | Android based video game console. Industrial design by Yves Béhar. Highest funded video game project on Kickstarter, and second highest funded project overall after the Pebble smartwatch. Development units began shipping in March 2013. | Jun 25, 2013 | |
| Star Command | War Balloon Games | Kickstarter | Aug 8, 2012 | $100,000 | $151,806 | Starship simulation video game. Windows and Mac versions. | May 2, 2013 | |
| Detective Grimoire | SFB Games & Armor Games | Kickstarter | Aug 2, 2012 | $25,000 | $29,611 | Point-and-click adventure game. | Jan 2, 2014 | |
| Divekick | One True Game Studios | Kickstarter | Jul 31, 2012 | $30,000 | $32,543 | Two-button fighting game. The campaign was cancelled before its scheduled 1 August end date despite achieving its target after the developer secured publisher funding. | Aug 20, 2013 | |
| Alpha Colony | DreamQuest Games | Kickstarter | Jul 15, 2012 | $500,000 | $101,472 | Strategy video game inspired by M.U.L.E. and The Settlers of Catan. First Kickstarter campaign for the game. | Not funded | |
| Clang | Subutai Corporation | Kickstarter | Jul 9, 2012 | $500,000 | $526,125 | Sword-fighting video game by Neal Stephenson. The campaign video was filmed at Bungie's motion capture studio; Gabe Newell makes a cameo appearance. Development frozen in September 2013 after Subutai failed to raise further funding. Cancelled in September 2014. | Cancelled | |
| Haunts: The Manse Macabre | Mob Rules Games | Kickstarter | Jul 6, 2012 | $25,000 | $28,739 | Turn-based strategy video game with a horror theme. Despite a successful campaign, delays in development meant that Mob Rules Games ran out of funds before project completion, halting Haunts development. The game was released in an incomplete state as an open source project in October 2012. | Oct 23, 2012 (source code) | |
| Dead State | DoubleBear Productions | Kickstarter | Jul 5, 2012 | $150,000 | $332,635 | Turn-based zombie RPG from Brian Mitsoda's DoubleBear Productions. | Dec 4, 2014 | |
| Lilly Looking Through | Geeta Games | Kickstarter | Jul 1, 2012 | $18,000 | $33,516 | Point-and-click adventure game. | Nov 19, 2013 | |
| Pinball Arcade: The Twilight Zone | FarSight Studios | Kickstarter | Jun 17, 2012 | $55,000 | $77,499 | Digitising and licensing The Twilight Zone for The Pinball Arcade. | Nov 30, 2012 | |
| Tex Murphy – Project Fedora | Big Finish Games | Kickstarter | Jun 16, 2012 | $450,000 | $598,104 | Graphic adventure game. Sixth game in the Tex Murphy series. Released as Tesla Effect: A Tex Murphy Adventure. | May 7, 2014 | |
| Tropes vs. Women in Video Games | Anita Sarkeesian | Kickstarter | Jun 16, 2012 | $6,000 | $158,922 | Documentary video series examining female gender tropes in video games. Sarkeesian was subject to an online harassment campaign during the Kickstarter campaign. | Mar 7, 2013 (first episode) | |
| SpaceVenture | Two Guys from Andromeda | Kickstarter | Jun 12, 2012 | $500,000 | $539,767 | Graphic adventure game, spiritual successor to the Space Quest series by its original creators. | Dec 23, 2025 | |
| Xenonauts | Goldhawk Interactive | Kickstarter | Jun 10, 2012 | $50,000 | $154,715 | Turn-based tactics science fiction video game inspired by the X-COM series. | Jun 17, 2014 | |
| Pathfinder Online | Goblinworks | Kickstarter | Jun 8, 2012 | $50,000 | $307,843 | MMORPG in the Pathfinder Roleplaying Game universe. First successful Kickstarter campaign for the game, contributing towards the technology demonstrator. | Cancelled | |
| Carmageddon: Reincarnation | Stainless Games | Kickstarter | Jun 6, 2012 | $400,000 | $625,143 | Vehicular combat racing video game. Fourth game in the Carmageddon series. | May 21, 2015 | |
| Diamond Trust of London | Jason Rohrer | Kickstarter | May 26, 2012 | $78,715 | $90,118 | Turn-based strategy video game. First crowdfunded Nintendo DS game. | Aug 28, 2012 | |
| Cloudberry Kingdom | Pwnee Studios | Kickstarter | May 26, 2012 | $20,000 | $23,582 | Platform game featuring procedurally generated levels. | Jun 30, 2013 | |
| Legends of Eisenwald | Aterdux Entertainment | Kickstarter | May 22, 2012 | $50,000 | $83,577 | Tactical role-playing game set in medieval Germany. | Jun 2, 2015 | |
| Ravaged | 2 Dawn Games | Kickstarter | May 20, 2012 | $15,000 | $38,767 | Multiplayer vehicular combat first-person shooter video game. | Oct 17, 2012 | |
| Jane Jensen's Moebius | Pinkerton Road Studio | Kickstarter | May 19, 2012 | $300,000 | $435,316 | Graphic adventure game from Jane Jensen, creator of the Gabriel Knight series. Released as Moebius: Empire Rising. | Apr 15, 2014 | |
| Grim Dawn | Crate Entertainment | Kickstarter | May 18, 2012 | $280,000 | $537,515 | Action RPG video game by members of the Titan Quest team. | Feb 25, 2016 | |
| République | Camouflaj | Kickstarter | May 11, 2012 | $500,000 | $555,662 | Stealth video game for iOS and Android. As a result of Kickstarter campaign feedback, PC and Mac versions were announced. | Dec 19, 2013 (first episode) | |
| Starlight Inception | Escape Hatch Entertainment | Kickstarter | May 9, 2012 | $150,000 | $158,152 | Space combat video game. | Apr 22, 2014 | |
| Thomas Was Alone | Mike Bithell | Indiegogo | May 8, 2012 | $4,000 | $2,452 | Flexible funding campaign. Platform game. Campaign to fund a voice actor to provide the narration. Despite failing to meet their campaign goals, Bithell received the funds raised, allowing Danny Wallace to be hired. | Jun 30, 2012 | |
| Yogventures! | Winterkewl Games | Kickstarter | May 6, 2012 | $250,000 | $567,665 | Multiplayer open world video game featuring The Yogscast. Development cancelled in July 2014. The Yogscast received $150,000 and the game's assets from Winterkewl at the conclusion of the Kickstarter but stressed that they were under no obligation to fulfil backer rewards following the project's collapse. The Yogscast later clarified that the remaining $150,000 they received from the Kickstarter went toward physical rewards, marketing and supporting the project, and added that they had spent a considerable amount of their own money on top of it. Backers were later offered copies of Tug and Landmark in lieu of the cancelled Yogventures! | Cancelled | |
| Nekro | darkForge | Kickstarter | May 4, 2012 | $100,000 | $158,733 | Action video game with a necromancy theme. | Cancelled | |
| Leisure Suit Larry: Reloaded | Replay Games | Kickstarter | May 2, 2012 | $500,000 | $655,182 | Graphic adventure game. Remake of 1987 video game Leisure Suit Larry in the Land of the Lounge Lizards. | Jun 27, 2013 | |
| Shadowrun Returns | Harebrained Schemes | Kickstarter | Apr 29, 2012 | $400,000 | $1,836,447 | Single-player tactical role-playing game in the Shadowrun universe, not to be confused with Shadowrun Online. | Jul 25, 2013 | |
| Class of Heroes 2 | MonkeyPaw Games, Gaijinworks | Kickstarter | Apr 27, 2012 | $500,000 | $96,951 | Japanese role-playing game developed by Acquire and released in Japan in 2009. Campaign to fund an English language release. Despite failing its campaign goals, the English version was released in June 2013. | Jun 4, 2013 | |
| The Banner Saga | Stoic | Kickstarter | Apr 20, 2012 | $100,000 | $723,886 | Tactical role-playing game set in the Viking Age. | Jan 14, 2014 | |
| Smart Controllers | Evolution Controllers | Kickstarter | Apr 19, 2012 | $60,000 | $34,030 | Bluetooth game controller designed primarily for mobile devices. First Kickstarter campaign for the controller. | Apr 2014 (began shipping) | |
| Wasteland 2 | inXile entertainment | Kickstarter | Apr 17, 2012 | $900,000 | $2,933,252 | Role-playing video game. Sequel to 1988's Wasteland, by members of the original team. | Sep 19, 2014 | |
| Nevermind | Erin Reynolds | Indiegogo | Apr 6, 2012 | $2,000 | $1,324 | Flexible funding campaign. Survival horror video game with dynamic difficulty based on biofeedback. First Indiegogo campaign for the game. | Sep 29, 2015 | |
| FTL: Faster Than Light | Subset Games | Kickstarter | Apr 1, 2012 | $10,000 | $200,542 | Roguelike starship strategy video game. | Sep 14, 2012 | |
| Takedown | Serellan | Kickstarter | Apr 1, 2012 | $200,000 | $221,833 | Tactical first-person shooter from Christian Allen's Serellan studio. Released as Takedown: Red Sabre. | Sep 20, 2013 | |
| Idle Thumbs | Idle Thumbs | Kickstarter | Mar 21, 2012 | $30,000 | $136,924 | Reviving the Idle Thumbs series of video game podcasts. First-person video game Thirty Flights of Loving was produced to promote the campaign. | Jun 19, 2012 | |
| Double Fine Adventure | Double Fine Productions | Kickstarter | Mar 13, 2012 | $400,000 | $3,336,371 | Point-and-click adventure game by Tim Schafer, designer of Full Throttle and Grim Fandango. Accompanied by a 2 Player Productions documentary. 87,142 backers, the most backers until surpassed by the Veronica Mars Movie Project in April 2013. Highest funded Kickstarter project until surpassed by the Pebble smartwatch in April 2012. Highest funded Kickstarter video game until surpassed by Project Eternity in October 2012. Credited with bringing in 60,000 first time backers on the Kickstarter platform, increasing the viability of crowdfunding in video games. Renamed Broken Age, first act released in January 2014, and the full game in April 2015. | Jan 28, 2014 (first act) | |
| Code Hero | Primer Labs | Kickstarter | Feb 24, 2012 | $100,000 | $170,954 | Educational video game to teach players computer programming. Despite a successful campaign, Primer Labs ran out of funds before project completion, exacerbating ongoing delays. | Cancelled | |
| Guns of Icarus Online | Muse Games | Kickstarter | Feb 21, 2012 | $10,000 | $35,237 | Steampunk team-based multiplayer airship combat video game. Spiritual successor to Guns of Icarus. First successful Kickstarter campaign for the game. | Oct 29, 2012 | |
| Angry Video Game Nerd: The Movie | James Rolfe | Indiegogo | Feb 2, 2012 | $75,000 | $325,327 | Flexible funding campaign. Comedy film based on The Angry Video Game Nerd series. Premiered at Grauman's Egyptian Theatre in July 2014. | Jul 21, 2014 | |
| Organ Trail: Director's Cut | The Men Who Wear Many Hats | Kickstarter | Jan 19, 2012 | $3,000 | $16,339 | Zombie survival video game parodying The Oregon Trail. Commercial remake of the free Adobe Flash original. | Aug 9, 2012 | |
| Waveform | Eden Industries | Kickstarter | Jan 3, 2012 | $8,000 | $3,762 | Wave manipulation action game. Despite failing its campaign goals, the game was released in March 2012. | Mar 20, 2012 | |
| StarDrive | Daniel DiCicco | Kickstarter | Dec 30, 2011 | $7,500 | $17,676 | 2D science fiction 4X video game with real-time strategy elements. | Apr 26, 2013 | |
| Cognition: An Erica Reed Thriller | Phoenix Online Studios | Kickstarter | Dec 11, 2011 | $25,000 | $34,247 | Point-and-click adventure game. Jane Jensen served as story consultant. | Oct 30, 2012 (first episode) | |
| BlindSide | Aaron & Mike | Kickstarter | Dec 1, 2011 | $7,000 | $14,191 | Survival horror audio game featuring a blind player character. | May 22, 2012 | |
| Lifeless Planet | David Board | Kickstarter | Oct 24, 2011 | $8,500 | $17,236 | Action-adventure science fiction video game. | Jun 6, 2014 | |
| Zombies, Run! | Six to Start and Naomi Alderman | Kickstarter | Oct 10, 2011 | $12,500 | $72,627 | Augmented reality game designed to complement running sessions for iOS and Android. | Feb 27, 2012 | |
| Venus Patrol | Brandon Boyer | Kickstarter | Oct 7, 2011 | $50,000 | $105,398 | Independent successor to Boing Boing's Offworld video games culture website. | Sep 2012 | |
| Star Command | War Balloon Games | Kickstarter | Oct 6, 2011 | $20,000 | $36,967 | Starship simulation video game. iOS and Android versions. Despite a successful campaign, War Balloon underestimated the funding required, necessitating further debt financing to fund the game. After lengthy delays, the iOS version released in May 2013 with a reduced scope compared to the original campaign vision. | May 2, 2013 (iOS) | |
| Videogame History Museum | Videogame History Museum | Kickstarter | Sep 1, 2011 | $30,000 | $50,266 | Nonprofit museum dedicated to preserving video game history. Campaign towards centralising the museum's collection, the first step towards establishing a permanent venue to host the museum. Opened as the National Videogame Museum in Frisco, Texas. | Apr 2, 2016 | |
| Blade Symphony | Puny Human Games | Kickstarter | Aug 28, 2011 | $15,000 | $19,058 | Action sword duelling video game. | May 7, 2014 | |
| Nexus 2 | Most Wanted Entertainment | GamesPlant | Aug 16, 2011 | €400,000 | €104,867 | Real-time tactics and space combat simulator game. Sequel to Nexus: The Jupiter Incident from Mithis Entertainment. First crowdfunding campaign for the game. | Not funded | |
| Octodad 2 | Young Horses | Kickstarter | Aug 10, 2011 | $20,000 | $24,320 | Stealth-action video game, players must maintain the cover of an octopus disguised as a human. Commercial sequel to the freeware Octodad. Released as Octodad: Dadliest Catch. | Jan 30, 2014 | |
| A House in California | Jake Elliott | Kickstarter | Oct 16, 2010 | $600 | $1,130 | Point-and-click art game. Campaign to fund a physical release of the game. Named Best Small Project at the 2010 Kickstarter Awards. Nominated for the Nuovo Award at the 2011 Independent Games Festival. | Oct 31, 2010 | |
| Indie Game: The Movie | BlinkWorks | Kickstarter | Jul 23, 2011 | $35,000 | $71,335 | Documentary film project covering independent video game development. Second successful Kickstarter campaign for the film, contributing towards post-production costs. Premiered at the 2012 Sundance Film Festival. | Jan 20, 2012 | |
| No Time to Explain | tinyBuild | Kickstarter | May 26, 2011 | $7,000 | $26,068 | Platform game with comedic time travel elements, update to the original Adobe Flash version. | Aug 15, 2011 | |
| Minecraft: The Story of Mojang | 2 Player Productions | Kickstarter | Mar 26, 2011 | $150,000 | $210,297 | Documentary film project covering Minecraft and its developer Mojang. Premiered on Xbox Live in December 2012. | Dec 22, 2012 | |
| Cthulhu Saves the World | Zeboyd Games | Kickstarter | Feb 16, 2011 | $3,000 | $6,898 | 2D comedy role-playing video game inspired by the 16-bit era. An enhanced port of the Xbox Live Indie Games original for Windows. | Jun 13, 2011 | |
| Kentucky Route Zero | Jake Elliott | Kickstarter | Feb 6, 2011 | $6,500 | $8,583 | Magical realist adventure game. Jake Elliott's second Kickstarter project, after A House in California in October 2010. | Jan 7, 2013 (first episode) | |
| Indie Game: The Movie | BlinkWorks | Kickstarter | Jul 20, 2010 | $15,000 | $23,341 | Documentary film project covering independent video game development. First successful Kickstarter campaign for the film, contributing towards the travel and production costs. The film premiered at the 2012 Sundance Film Festival. | Jan 20, 2012 | |
| Sequence | Jason Wishnov | Kickstarter | Apr 27, 2010 | $600 | $2,602 | Rhythm action role-playing video game. | May 6, 2011 | |
| Glorkian Warrior | James Kochalka and Pixeljam | Kickstarter | Mar 22, 2010 | $10,000 | $11,200 | 2D shoot 'em up designed by James Kochalka. | Mar 14, 2014 | |
| Kill Screen | Kill Screen | Kickstarter | Nov 15, 2009 | $3,500 | $5,949 | Video games magazine. | Mar 2010 (first issue) | |
| Flywrench | Mark Essen | Kickstarter | Nov 1, 2009 | $5,000 | $5,070 | 2D action game. | Aug 24, 2015 | |
| Resonance | VinceTwelve | Kickstarter | Nov 1, 2009 | $150 | $2,080 | Graphic adventure game. Campaign to fund the game's submission into competition at the 2010 Independent Games Festival. | Jun 19, 2012 | |

== See also ==
- List of most successful crowdfunding projects
