= The Deer God =

- Developer: Crescent Moon Games
- Publishers: Crescent Moon Games; Mobot Studios; Level 77
- Designer: Josh Presseisen
- Programmer: Kyle McKeever
- Artists: Josh Presseisen; Luke Viljoen
- Composer: Evan Gipson
- Engine: Unity
- Platforms: Linux, OS X, Windows, Xbox One, Android, iOS, Wii U, PlayStation 4, PlayStation Vita, Nintendo Switch
- Release: Linux, OS X, Windows; February 27, 2015; Xbox One; September 1, 2015; Android, iOS; September 3, 2015; Wii U; April 28, 2016; PS4, PS Vita; April 25, 2017; Switch; December 21, 2017
- Genre: Platform
- Mode: Single-player

The Deer God is a platform game developed by Crescent Moon Games and published by Mobot Studios on Wii U and Level 77 on Nintendo Switch. It was first released for Linux, OS X, and Windows in early access on December 2, 2014, followed by a full release on February 27, 2015. The game was released for the Xbox One on September 1, 2015, on Android and iOS on September 3, 2015, on the Wii U on April 28, 2016, on the PlayStation 4 and PlayStation Vita on April 25, 2017, and on the Nintendo Switch on December 21, 2017.

The game revolves around a hunter who is killed by wolves while attempting to shoot a deer during a storm, and, while in purgatory, discovers that God is actually a female deer. She reincarnates him in deer form, telling him he must atone by experiencing life as one. The gameplay involves traveling through procedurally-generated levels while searching for food and defeating predators who oppose the Deer God. The game received mixed to negative reviews from critics, who praised its pixelated graphics and style, but criticized its gameplay as overly-punishing and noted large amounts of software bugs.

== Gameplay ==
The player starts out reincarnated as a deer, and must retrieve relics while fending off predatory animals such as bears, cougars or alligators. The game has a basic moral alignment system in which the player gains good karma when they defeat predators, but gains negative karma when they defeat harmless creatures or they otherwise perish while onscreen. The overworld is procedurally generated at the start of a new run, though enemy placement changes with each death.

The game has two difficulty settings, "hardcore" mode, where the player has a set number of lives and running out leads to a game over, and normal, where the player will respawn as a weak fawn if they run out of lives. As the player increases in good karma, they gain new abilities, but if their negative karma outstrips the good, they have the chance of spawning as a weak creature that is unable to progress until they die and reincarnate as a deer again.

The game has a hunger mechanic in which the player must stop to eat or their health will begin to drain.

== Reception ==
Shaun Musgrave of TouchArcade gave a mixed review to the game's iOS version, saying that it was "beautiful" and "zen-like" at times, but that the game could also be "clumsy, ugly, and lacking in gracefulness". Calling the premise "clever" and the bosses "a real challenge", he was annoyed at the amount of bugs, though noted that the game was being updated to attempt to remove them. Nevertheless, he said that the game's problems ran deeper, calling the controls awkward. He also expressed discontent with the game's karma system, saying it added an unnecessary annoyance if players accumulated negative karma, and called the hunger mechanic "vestigial". Saying that the game told a "simple yet moving story" and was "enchanting", he was nevertheless disappointed by its weaker aspects.

Marsh Davies of Rock Paper Shotgun criticized the game's permadeath mechanic as "unjust" and said that its save system worked poorly, as reincarnating into the form of a baby deer weakened the player drastically and defeated the point of saving in the first place. He called the game "hamstrung by its system of non-progression and by its duff beast-on-beast combat", though he noted that the game featured "lovely" incidental details.

GamesTM magazine rated the game negatively, saying that its visuals and music were "stunning", but that the game was otherwise a "mess" with an unclear message, and a "failed experiment".
