= Nekro =

- Developer: darkForge
- Platforms: Windows, macOS, Linux
- Release: Canceled

Nekro was a cancelled action video game from darkForge that was successfully crowd-funded through Kickstarter. Playing as a necromancer character, players conquer empires while controlling evil minions. Gameplay areas are randomly generated with an overhead perspective. Linking the game to Dungeon Keeper, Forbes described the goal of the game as "you're the villain and it's your job to sow chaos and destruction." Gaming website Joystiq describes the game's developers as finding a "happy medium between hellish gore and shiny-happy creatures".
