= Sentris =

2015 video game

- Developer: Timbre Interactive
- Publisher: Timbre Interactive
- Designer: Samantha Kalman
- Engine: Unity
- Platforms: Linux, Microsoft Windows, OS X
- Release: WW: August 12, 2015
- Genre: Music video game
- Mode: Single-player

Sentris is a music video game where players solve puzzles by composing musical loops. Following a successful Kickstarter crowdfunding campaign in October 2013, an early access version of the game was released for Linux, Microsoft Windows and OS X in August 2014, with an official release in August 2015. A PlayStation 4 version was planned, but it was never realised. An Ouya version was in development, until the Razer acquisition rendered the contract void.

== Gameplay ==
In Sentris, players drop musical notes from various instruments onto a set of rotating concentric circles, these circles represent musical loops which replay the music to the player. Within these circles lie puzzle targets, players must drop the correct note onto the target to succeed. Aside from the puzzle gameplay, Sentris also offers performance and remix modes.

== Development ==
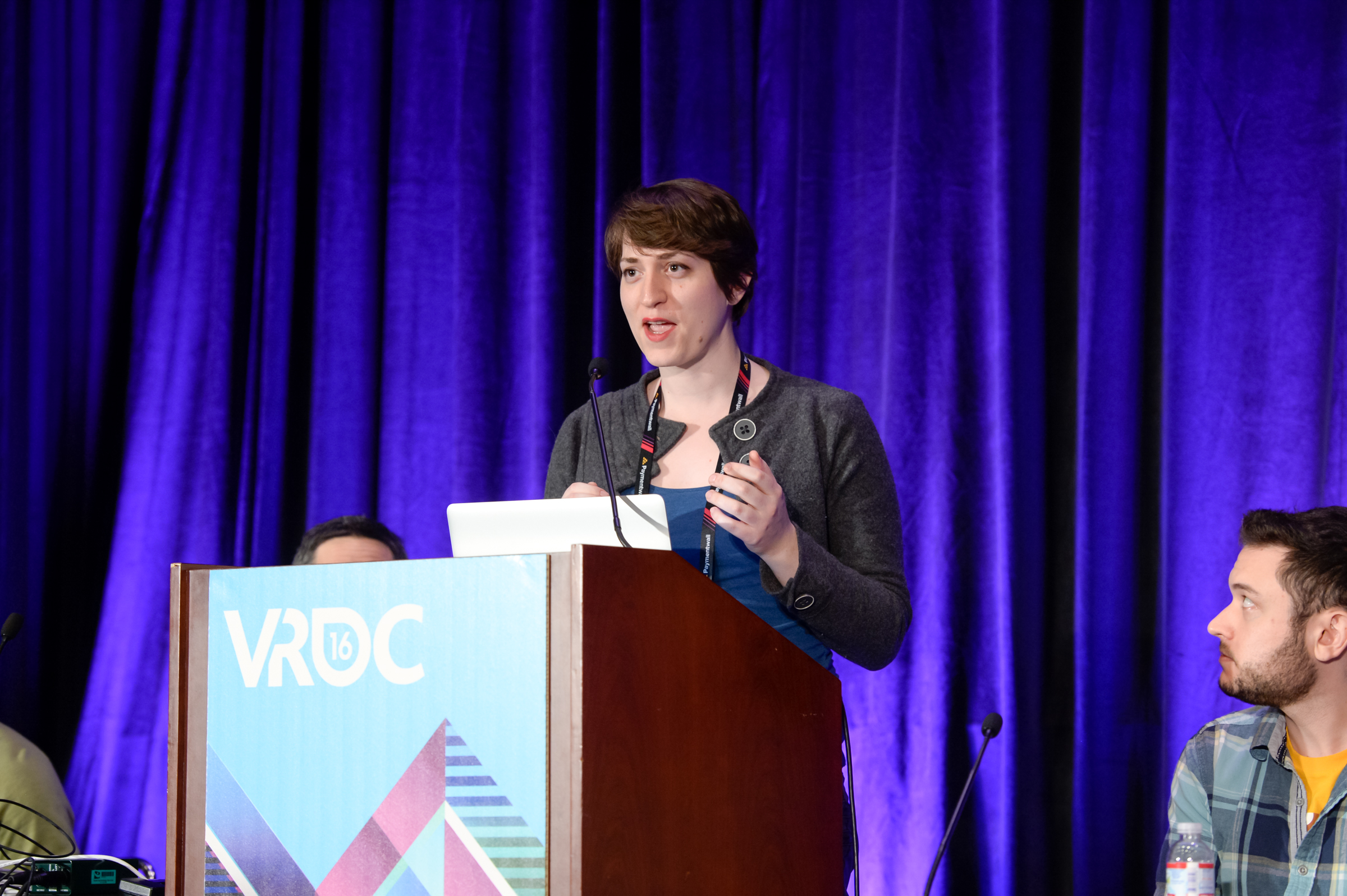
Samantha Kalman designed and developed the game

Sentris is designed and developed by Samantha Kalman, founder and director of Timbre Interactive. While Kalman had prior experience shipping software as QA director at Unity, Sentris is her first commercial video game. Given her experience, Unity was a natural choice for the game engine, Kalman also cites Unity's low cost as an important factor in her decision.

Kalman began working on Sentris full-time in the Summer of 2013. She had first attempted full-time games development in 2011, and though that attempt failed, it did produce Sen, a free music video game with many of the concepts that would be found in Sentris. Kalman was inspired to make a music video game by her time spent playing in a band, she wanted to create a game which captured the joy of creation she felt during jam sessions. Kalman collaborated with musicians, Danny Baranowsky, Disasterpeace and Kasson Crooker on the game.

A well received showing of a Sentris prototype at the 2013 Seattle Indies Expo encouraged Kalman to seek funding on Kickstarter. The crowdfunding campaign began in October 2013 seeking to raise US$50,000, it concluded in November 2013 with US$56,361 raised. Though the campaign was a success, Kalman found it challenging to shift from developing the game to marketing it. She said that if she were to run future Kickstarter campaigns, she would have more help, and better plan the announcements during the campaign.

An alpha version of Sentris was released as an early access title in August 2014. The full version was originally intended for a 2014 release, but was delayed to August 2015. Planned updates include an engine upgrade to Unity 5, which will allow Kalman to access "the [new] audio mixer, new audio effects, and a ton of under-the-hood audio improvements."

== Reception ==
PC Gamer awarded the 62% in a mixed review. Their writer, James Davenport, found its interface unintuitive, requiring a "frustrating thirty-minute decryption session" to get started. He managed to create some worthwhile musical loops, but felt that the game "tries to be both a music creator and a music toy, and it just isn't a great example of either".
