= SC2VN =

2015 video game

- Developer: Team Eleven Eleven
- Publisher: Team Eleven Eleven
- Director: Timothy Young
- Writer: TJ Huckabee
- Platform: Windows
- Release: September 22, 2015
- Genre: Visual novel
- Mode: Single-player

SC2VN (short for Starcraft II Visual Novel) is a free indie visual novel developed by Team Eleven Eleven and released for Windows on September 22, 2015. Set in South Korea during the early days of the competitive StarCraft II: Wings of Liberty scene, it follows Mach, an aspiring professional gamer. The game has been praised for its realistic depiction of esports, including its emotional toll and the possibility of failure. It was followed by a prequel, Don't Forget Our Esports Dream.

== Plot ==
The game's main character is Mach, an aspiring professional gamer who fails to qualify for VSL, a fictional version of the premier StarCraft II league in South Korea. However, he meets a friendly Korean Terran player named Accel who offers to mentor him, recognizing his talent. Mach is quickly drawn into the highest echelons of the StarCraft II scene, helping to create a new team in order to defeat a legendary Brood War player.

Mach's gender is selectable between male and female, and choosing to play as a female Mach changes the player's experience of the esports community, reflecting real life gender discrimination, although the developers did not want the game to feel like an "online harassment simulator".

== Development ==
The game developed by American co-creators TJ Huckabee and Timothy Young, and was funded on Kickstarter, raising about US$7,000. While it was initially envisioned as a joke game and dating sim, the creators decided to take the game seriously following the successful fundraising campaign. Despite the game being free, they still had to get approval from the "highest levels of Blizzard" to get permission to publish the game, which involved "a lot of Skype calls" and licensing agreements.

Due to the historically intense environment of gender discrimination in esports, Young stated that the developers initially intended to set the game on an alternate Earth where female professional gamers were treated equally as men. However, feeling like this would erase a legitimate issue in esports, they made the female characters still face discrimination, while at the same time not suffering overtly for being women.

== Reception ==
Rob Zacny of PC Gamer praised the game for how realistically it depicted esports, saying that "while the game is [...] full of broad, archetypal characters, a lot of the words that come of their mouths are not so very far from the things I've heard in countless interviews". Cassandra Khaw of Ars Technica called the game "at times hilarious, at times meditative" and saying that while the game is "ultimately a triumphant celebration of esports' best aspects", the game "does brush against some serious topics" including the "exploitative nature of the scene". Emanuel Maiberg of VICE stated that the game was "an effective and entertaining crash course in how [StarCraft II] works, its place in South Korean culture, and eSports in general."

== Legacy ==
The game's prequel, Don't Forget Our Esports Dream, released on November 20, 2018, after another Kickstarter campaign that exceeded its US$35,000 goal. It follows two characters from the first game, Jett, the leader of the team, and Bolt, the game's villain, as they try to make something of themselves following major setbacks to their Brood War careers.
