= Mainlining =

2017 video game

- Developer: Rebelephant
- Publisher: Merge Games
- Engine: GameMaker Studio
- Platform: Windows
- Release: 26 January 2017
- Genre: Point and click adventure
- Mode: Multiplayer

Mainlining is a point and click adventure that simulates hacking. Mainlining was released on January 26, 2017 for Microsoft Windows.

== Gameplay ==
Mainlining is a point and click adventure game. The game takes place on the simulated desktop of the player character's computer. Assuming the role of a newly recruited MI7 agent and working within the remit of the Blu Pill Act, the player must use their skill, judgment, and cunning to gather evidence by hacking suspects' computers and phones. As a member of MI7, the player must investigate around in files, folders, websites, online profiles, bank statements, trying to find evidence on a target. The player must submit their evidence, along with the suspect's location, to an "arrest system". If the player gets the right piece of evidence, on the right person and the right place, they get locked up and it is on to the next day's case file.

== Reception ==
Reception

Aggregate score
Aggregator	Score
Metacritic	73/100

Review score
Publication	Score
Hardcore Gamer	3.5/5

Critics gave the game "mixed or average" reviews, according to review aggregator Metacritic.

Hardcore Gamer gave the game a score of 3.5/5.
