= Spud's Quest =

2013 video game

- Steam cover art
- Developer: Mouldy Toof Studios
- Publisher: Clickteam
- Designer: Chris Davis
- Composer: Chris Davis
- Engine: Multimedia Fusion
- Platform: Microsoft Windows
- Release: Kickstarter; September 15, 2013; Steam; July 31, 2014
- Genre: Adventure-Platformer
- Mode: Single-player

Spud's Quest is an independent adventure platformer video game for Microsoft Windows. The game draws its inspiration from a number of classic video games, most notably the Dizzy, The Legend of Zelda, Tomb Raider and Metroid series. This is the first game developed by Mouldy Toof Studios, a one-man studio led by Chris Davis. It was made with Clickteam Fusion 2.5 (CF2.5), a video game creation tool.

Spud's Quest was first released as a short demo on October 23, 2006. Chris Davis later decided to expand it into a larger commercial game. On October 31, 2012, Chris Davis launched a crowdfunding campaign on Kickstarter to fund a complete version of the game, with a funding goal of £5,000. This campaign was successfully funded with £6,033 by 475 backers, and the game was released on September 15, 2013. The game was released on Steam July 31, 2014.

== Description ==
In this game, players take on the role of Spud and his friend Prince Charming, who has been cursed by an evil wizard and turned into a frog. The pair set on a journey to uncover four ancient elemental essences that have the power to banish the evil and remove the curse. The plot draws inspiration from various fairy tales, Arthurian legend, and mythology from Greek, Norse and Mayan.

The game features pixel-art graphics and gameplay ranging between a Metroidvania and a point-and-click Adventure game, with a rich fantasy-based world full of secrets, five dungeons brimming with puzzles and enemies to explore, and plenty of characters to interact with along the way.

== Reception ==
Spud's Quest received generally positive reviews from most reviewers.

Reception

Review scores
Publication	Score
Gamezebo	4.5/5
Indie Game Reviewer	4/5
Retro 101	7/10
ZTGD	87/100
The Star	N/A
