= Star Command (2013 video game) =

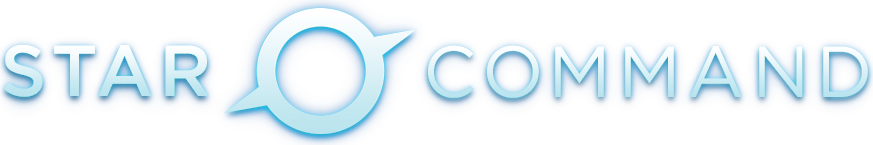
- Developers: Star Command, LLC
- Designers: Jordan Coombs, Justin Coombs
- Programmer: Steve Tranby
- Engine: Cocos2d
- Platforms: iOS, Android
- Release: May 2, 2013
- Genres: Simulation game, Role-playing game
- Mode: Single player

Star Command, is a video game developed initially for iOS, then later Android, and eventually PCs. The game is a space exploration and combat simulation game, with players acting as captain of a starship who is tasked with exploring the galaxy and defending his crew from hostile aliens.

The games developers successfully launched a Kickstarter campaign to fund the game's completion, originally set for December 2011. Major difficulties emerged in hitting deadlines, as the game was more complex to create than anticipated, and funding ran out. A second and far larger Kickstarter was done in 2012, and the game was released on iOS on May 2, 2013. The Android version was released, debuting in the Humble Mobile Bundle 2 on September 25, 2013, with PC and Macintosh versions released after that.

== Gameplay ==
Players must balance attacking their opponents ship with protecting their crew

The game is a simulation game where players control a crew inside their spaceship. The crew can be expanded by players hiring new members to perform different specialized functions, such as scientists and security, and they can also be promoted to higher ranks. The ships different systems are also upgradable. Crew members die permanently when they are killed. Firing ship weapons successfully involves playing a minigame based on correctly timing taps on buttons. Players begin the game on "Beginner" difficulty, with an optional tutorial, and upon completion they have optional difficulty levels of "Normal", "Hard" and then "Black Hole".

== Story ==
Players are members of Star Command, a humanoid interplanetary organization charged with protecting the human race and exploring the universe. The player begins in the Solar System, first encountering a hostile alien race, the Antorians, then assisting a friendly alien race. However, the player is forced to escape the Sol system due to false accusations that the player's ship destroyed a Star Command vessel. While exploring a far away galaxy and meeting many more races, the Antorians decimate the Star Command fleet until the player returns to defeat the Antorian invaders. The Antorians also reveal that it was their plan to frame the player for the destruction of the friendly vessel.

== Development ==
When the game was first revealed in March 2011, they described it as a cross between Star Trek and Game Dev Story. A Kickstarter campaign was launched in October 2011 and was successful, receiving over one thousand contributors and raising $43,000, exceeding their goal of $20,000. The game was initially slated for release in December 2011. In December 2011, developer Jordon Coombs stated that the Alpha phase was expected to be finished that month, that the games musicians had been hired, and release was expected in 2012. Financial difficulties ensued as the money raised only amounted to $6,000 for the project, and $4,000 after taxes. Later the game was announced in an interview to be released in the summer of 2012. The game developers expected the game to take six months to complete like other mobile games, but the games complexity greatly increased the amount of time required. The game was later previewed with a playable demo of the games combat at PAX East in March 2012. A second Kickstarter campaign was launched to provide funding to finish the mobile version of the game and create a PC and Macintosh version. This caused confusion and anger among many fans, wondering why developers wanted more money when they had yet to finish the original version promised. A thirteen-minute preview was released in October 2012. In early April 2013 the developers put out an apology for the game's many missed release dates. The PC version of the game will serve as the test bed for the game, and features added and tested there will be added to the mobile versions thereafter.

== Reception ==
Reception

Aggregate scores
Aggregator	Score
GameRankings	78.03%
Metacritic	76/100

Review scores
Publication	Score
IGN	6.7 of 10
TouchArcade	4.5 of 5
Gamezebo	4 of 5

=== Pre-release ===
In 2011, IGN listed Star Command as one of their iOS titles players should look out for, and in 2012 as one of the top 20 most anticipated games of 2012.

Polygon video game news site played the games beta and noted its charming retro graphics and fun gameplay, as well as the lack of choice and consequence in the storytelling. The Guardian picked it as one of their weekly best IOS app releases, and said that though it is very challenging, it lives up to the hype that had built up pre-release.

=== Sales and reaction ===
The game was the Editors "Pick of the Week" on the American iPhone App Store, and peaked at number 2 Top Selling iPhone app, and number 35 Top Selling iPad app on May 2, 2013.

Kotaku said it is a "Great Game", but mentioned that the exploration and diplomacy aspects of the game, that were initially pitched in 2011 and which developers say is coming, were missed. Gamezebo also missed promised features, yet thought the game was "funny, frenzied, and dripping with style". IGN called the game "Okay", praising the games style and music, but called the game repetitive and lacking depth.

Mark Hattersey's MacUser said the game's origins on the social funding website Kickstarter is "ultimately much more interesting than the game itself", that the "construction and management and mini-game battles are all fine (if basic)" but that combat is "terrible" and "fiddly". The review—which gave the game three out of five—also noted that a number of "promised features" are not present including diplomacy, research and exploration: "This must be the only Star Trek game ever designed where your characters can't beam down to an alien planet".
