= Luna The Shadow Dust =

2020 puzzle adventure game

- Developer: Lantern Studio
- Publishers: Application Systems Heidelberg; Coconut Island Games
- Engine: Unity
- Platforms: Linux; macOS; Windows; Nintendo Switch; iOS; Android
- Release: 13 February 2020: Linux, macOS, Windows; February 13, 2020; Nintendo Switch; October 22, 2020; iOS; June 6, 2024; Android; June 17, 2024
- Genres: Adventure, puzzle
- Mode: Single-player

Luna The Shadow Dust is a 2020 adventure video game developed by Lantern Studio and published by Coconut Island Games and Application Systems Heidelberg. The game tells the story of Üri and Layh.

== Description ==
Luna The Shadow Dust is a hand-drawn puzzle point-and-click adventure game without dialogue.

The plot tells the story of a boy named Üri who taking on an unexpected journey to uncover the secret beyond an ancient tower. During his journey, Üri finds and rescues a strange creature named Layh.

The gameplay focuses on mixing elements of adventure and puzzle gaming. The game takes place in a tall tower, which consists of rooms. The player must find the solution to each room in order to progress to the next. An original aspect of the game is that the player controls two playable characters, each of whom has a unique set of abilities.

== Development ==
Lantern Studio was founded in China in 2015 by Fox Zhuang, Wang Guan, Wang Qian and Beidi Guo who was nominated for Game Dev Heroes 2020.

The game was crowdfunded through Kickstarter in 2016.

== Reception ==
Reception

Aggregate scores
Aggregator	Score
Metacritic	PC: 75/100; NS: 71/100
OpenCritic	61% recommend

Review scores
Publication	Score
Adventure Gamers	3.5/5
Game Informer	7.5/10
Gamezebo	70/100

Luna The Shadow Dust received "generally favorable" reviews according to review aggregator website Metacritic, and 61% of critics recommended the game according to OpenCritic.

=== Accolades ===
Year	Award	Category	Result	Ref.
2016	IndiePlay Shanghai	Excellence in Visual Art	Won	
2018	Indie Prize London	Best Game Audio	Nominated	
2020	IGF Awards	Excellence in Visual Art	Longlisted	
2020	JSUG Awards	The Game That Made Us Cry	Won	
2020	TOMMI Award	Best PC Game	Nominated	
2020	The Aggie Awards	Best Animation	Won	
2020	The Aggie Awards	Best Music	Nominated	
2020	NAVGTR Awards	Outstanding Game, Puzzle	Won	
2020	NAVGTR Awards	Outstanding Game, Original Family	Nominated	
2020	NAVGTR Awards	Outstanding Original Light Mix Score, New IP	Nominated	
