= Monochroma =

2014 video game

- Developer: Nowhere Studios
- Publishers: Nowhere Studios (Steam); Merge Games (Retail)
- Engine: Unity 3D
- Platforms: Microsoft Windows; Mac OS X; Linux; Xbox One
- Release: Microsoft Windows, Mac OS X, Linux; May 28, 2014; Xbox One; June 24, 2016
- Genre: Cinematic puzzle-platformer
- Mode: Single-player

Monochroma is a cinematic puzzle-platform video game, and the first title by Istanbul-based developer Nowhere Studios. It was released on Xbox One on June 24, 2016.

== Plot ==
Monochroma tells the story of two brothers in a dystopian world. While the older brother watches over the younger, the younger brother receives a leg injury. The older brother must carry the younger brother throughout the game. The brothers must complete various puzzles in order to save their world from tyranny.

== Development ==
The game was first announced at GDC 2013. To acquire sufficient funding for the game, the project was first revealed on crowdfunding website Kickstarter to reach a goal of US$80,000, and successfully exceeded the goal, acquiring $84,644. The game was approved on Steam Greenlight on September 19, 2013 and released on May 28, 2014.

== Reception ==
Reception

Aggregate score
Aggregator	Score
Metacritic	(PC) 55/100 (XONE) 66/100

Review scores
Publication	Score
GameSpot	4/10
Hardcore Gamer	3.5/5

Monochroma received "mixed or average" reviews, according to review aggregator Metacritic.

Tom McShea of GameSpot gave the game 4/10, stating that "most of the later puzzles demanding precision that's just not possible" and "there are too many problems heaping frustration upon you". Hardcore Gamer gave it a 3.5/5, saying: "The colorless world may have drained the life from everything in it, but its endless challenges can’t leech the determination of a boy intent on keeping his brother safe."
