= Nevermind (2015 video game) =

- Developer: Flying Mollusk
- Publisher: Flying Mollusk
- Designer: Erin Reynolds
- Platforms: Microsoft Windows, OS X, Xbox One
- Release: Microsoft Windows, OS X; September 29, 2015; Xbox One; January 11, 2017
- Genre: Horror
- Mode: Single-player

Nevermind is a first-person horror video game developed by Flying Mollusk. It was released for Microsoft Windows and OS X in 2015, and for Xbox One in 2017. The story revolves around the minds of people who have suppressed memories of horrible events.

== Plot ==
The players takes over the role of an expert that was recently hired by the Neurostalgia Institute to treat their patients in a mind jacking process known as neuroprobing. Every patient there suffers from a form of repressed mental trauma. In order to help them resolve their issues, the player performs neuroprobing to obtain the recollections of the repressed memories so that the trauma can be cured. By advancing through and being nearer to the goal, things around the player change in hostile ways as their minds fight back.

== Gameplay ==
Nevermind was designed to be played with devices that support biometric feedback (their usage is optional), because the more the player is under stress, the harder the game becomes. If the player gets scared, certain events will occur (for example, the game screen will become foggy and unsteady, making navigation more difficult). The difficulty decreases by calming down. It uses Intel RealSense for the sensors that can track player's pulse in real-time, and Affectiva's Affdex to recognize emotions and translate that into the game's events. While being inside of a patient's mind, the objective is to find ten photos per client, each representing the parts of their memories. Resembling Myst, Nevermind has some puzzle adventure elements, which consist of navigating environments and solving the puzzles before any progress can be made.

== Development ==
Erin Reynolds started with the game's development at the media program for graduate studies at the University of Southern California. For a thesis, Reynolds had a year to develop any kind of game of her choice, which became Nevermind. A team that worked on it created one level, and disbanded after graduation. The following year, Reynolds started a company to build a full version of Nevermind. The aim of the project was to recognize and to help solve the player's anxieties. In early 2014, the developers launched a Kickstarter campaign, asking for $250,000. It ended being unsuccessful, earning $129,615. In October 2014, Nevermind was back for another campaign on Kickstarter, being set at a lower goal of $75,000. The funding was successful with $76,525 being pledged by the backers.
