= Pixel Press =

American video game development company

- Type: Private
- Industry: Video game development
- Founded: 2013
- Founders: Rob Bennet; Robin Rath; Josh Stevens; Daniel Wiseman
- Headquarters: 317 North 11th Street Suite 500, St. Louis, United States
- Area served: United States
- Key people: Robin Rath (CEO); Rob Bennet (CTO); Amber Schey (Sales & Marketing Director); James Macanufo (Creative Director)
- Website: www.projectpixelpress.com

Pixel Press is an American video game development company with headquarters in St. Louis. Founded in 2013, it is known for its development of platforms that simplify the process of creating video games by starting from real-world objects.

== History ==
Pixel Press was founded in January 2013 by Robin Rath, Josh Stevens, Daniel Wiseman and Rob Bennet. Rath and Stevens grew up in Murphysboro, Illinois and played games such as Mario Bros., often drawing their own video game concepts on paper. Rath had the idea of transforming these video game ideas drawn on paper into real video games. After creating a video with the assistance of Rath's father, they launched a Kickstarter campaign.

The campaign was launched in June 2013 with the aim to raise $100,000. It managed to raise $20,000 in the first day and reached its goal in 26 days.

In 2015, Pixel Press was accepted into an accelerator program in San Francisco from which it received $50,000 and mentoring from Zynga staff. The company also launched a second Kickstarter campaign in 2015, successfully raising $68,000 for production and development of its upcoming game, Bloxels.

== Products ==
Pixel Press has developed several platforms which allow their users to create their own video game. Pixel Press' platforms have been used by schools, such as the Grand Center Arts Academy, offering development of skills, such as critical problem solving and design thinking, to its users. The company has hosted annual game jams in St. Louis and their hometown of Murphysboro, to introduce students to game development through its platforms.

The first application developed was named Pixel Press Floors and it was free to download. Its users can draw levels of arcade games on graph paper using special symbols. Upon completion of the drawing, users have to take a picture of it with an iPad and upload it on the app, which processes the picture and creates a video game. Pixel Press' software leverages Computer Vision utilizing the open source OpenCV computer vision library, enabling creators to build from physical objects. With OpenCV as a base, Pixel Press has created Optical Character Recognition systems for its games and is currently working on a 3D object detection and color recognition system for Bloxels.

Pixel Press' second effort was a game that was the result of collaboration with Cartoon Network and Grumpyface Studios. Named Adventure Time Game Wizard, it was designed for Apple, Android and Kindle devices. It was based on Cartoon Network's Adventure Time series, and it allowed its users to design levels of the game, using predefined elements, and play it using several characters from the series.

Bloxels was the third platform developed by Pixel Press. It uses a physical board with a 13x13 grid to create a video game. The users place various color blocks that each represent an in-game item. These blocks are placed on a gameboard and then a picture is taken with the Bloxels app to create a playable level of a game. Games can be further enhanced by creating animated characters and villains within the game. Pixel Press has also developed its own character universe, named B.R.A.V.E. Squad, to introduce users to the platform's features. Unlike other game building platforms, the company does not allow its users to sell the games they create, as the developers see it as an educational tool for children.

Bloxels, Pixel Press' remaining platform, has since undergone a remake: the old apps, including Bloxels Star Wars and Bloxels Builder are no longer supported or available for [first-time] download.
