= Empires of Eve =

2016 book by Andrew Groen about the online video game Eve Online

Empires of Eve: A History of the Great Wars of Eve
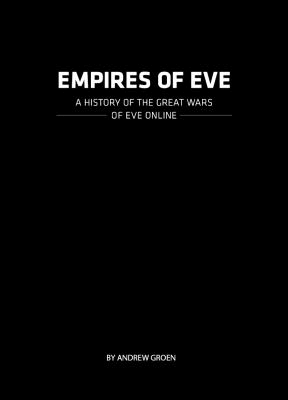
- Author: Andrew Groen
- Language: English
- Genre: Nonfiction
- Publisher: Lightburn Industries
- Publication date: 2016
- Publication place: United States
- Pages: 188 pages
- ISBN: 0990972402

Empires of Eve: A History of the Great Wars of Eve is a book by journalist Andrew Groen about the online game Eve Online. Groen wrote the book to explore the immersion in a relatively-niche game shared by its 50,000 players (not just the developers, as other MMO games were). Groen's book illustrates the in-universe aspect of the game.

Empires of Eve focuses on Eve Online's 2003–2009 period. It details betrayals, alliances, and leaders of the game's player factions in addition to its history, illuminating Eve Online's darker corners to indicate player involvement.

== Background ==
Eve Online is a space-based, persistent-world massively multiplayer online role-playing game (MMORPG) developed and published by CCP Games. It is a single-universe game, shaped by players and developers. Eve Online was released in North America and Europe in May 2003. It was published from May to December 2003 by Simon & Schuster Interactive, after which CCP purchased the rights and began self-publishing via digital distribution. In February 2013, Eve Online reached over 500,000 subscribers. Set more than 21,000 years in the future, Eve Online explains that humanity (having used up most of Earth's resources through centuries of explosive population growth) began colonizing the rest of the Milky Way.

== Development ==
Empires of Eve was written by journalist Andrew Groen. Groen, who had written for Wired and Ars Technica, wanted to write a book about parts of the video-game world which had been overlooked by other journalists. Eve Online was released around that time, and Groen began researching the game. The game met his criterion for uniqueness because of its focus on causation. Groen looked for past work about Eve Online; a 2003 forum post ("Death to Taggart, Death to Ragnar, Death to the memory of this treacherous night" by player Jade Constantine) caught his attention and inspired him to write the book. He spent two years in research, talking to over 70 players, examining forum posts and reading data related to the game. Groen had never played Eve Online before he wrote the book, and said that his idea for a book was not seriously considered; without Empires of Eve, the game's history might have been lost. He began a Kickstarter campaign to raise money for the book in 2014.

== Synopsis ==
Empires of Eve illustrates the betrayals, alliances and leaders of Eve Online, presenting the game's 2003-2009 history from an outsider's perspective. In it, everyone from the miners to the leaders becomes involved and contributes to conflict. Empires of Eve emphasizes the corporations (player-created groups) in the game's history and conflicts, incorporating lesser-known aspects of the game into the main narrative to illustrate its human side.

In the first chapter, the Red Alliance (a Russian player group) makes its last stand against a faction of enemies; Eve Online is then explained to readers unfamiliar with the game. Returning to the game, the Evolution Corporation and Eve Online's alpha and beta testing are explored. This is followed by the formation of the Venal Alliance and the betrayal which leads it to enter the 2003 civil war. The narrative moves on to cover how Evolution, Reikokou and the Jericho Fraction united as the Band of Brothers to battle the Phoenix Alliance (formerly the Venal Alliance) in the Great Northern War of 2004. The Band of Brothers, which played an important part in the war, is documented from its formation through its battle against the Fountain Alliance (its former allies) for Delve in 2005.

Groen then covers the founding of Ascendant Frontier, including its alliance history, betrayals and war with the Band of Brothers (who feel threatened by the Frontier's technological weapons). In 2004, the Goons (player-created groups in Eve Online) are introduced. The Goons fail eight times to hold together a corporation before they succeed, with the founding of Goonfleet. Their failed fight for independence, expansion under the Goonswarm banner and defeat by the Dusk and Dawn Alliance are explored.

Goonswarm aligns with the struggling Red Alliance, reclaiming the Red Alliance home in a battle against the Coalition of the South. The story then focuses on the run-up to the Great War and the battle itself, which ends in an armistice between the survivors. The Great War is a battle between the RedSwarm Federation (Goonswarm, the Red Alliance and the Tau Ceti Federation) against the Band of Brothers. Other factions covered here are the Northern Coalition, Lotka Volterra and the Band of Brothers. The Band of Brothers invades the Northern Coalition in the Maximum Damage campaign, and Red Alliance disintegrates into smaller alliances. The next part of the Great War covers Agamar (a traitor) before concluding with a summary of the book's events and future predictions.

== Publication, promotion and reception ==
Empires of Eve and its companion e-book were published in 2016 by Lightburn Industries. The e-book was for funders and customers who preordered the print edition. Groen promoted Eve Online within the game, in keeping with the book's theme. In 2017, a podcast by Groen based on Empires of Eve began. According to Nate Hohl of GameCrate, Empires of Eve makes the conflicts in Eve Online "a heck more fun to read about than to watch". Russ Allbery of Eyrie.org gave Empires of Eve eight out of ten stars and said that the book "has been very successful within its niche". Peter Freeman of Critically Sane gave Empires of Eve four out of five stars, calling it a "special book that deserves to be read by anyone interested in experimental writing alongside a Game of Thrones-like tale in space". David Andrews of Bookworm Everlasting said that non-fans of Eve Online would still find the book engrossing. Most of the Eve Online players described in the book reacted positively to Empires of Eve.

In early 2018, Groen raised funds for Empires of Eve Volume 2; the sequel will describe Eve Online's 2009–2016 history. Groen said in an early-2018 interview that being an Eve Online player or reading Empires of Eve was not required to enjoy the new book. By spring 2018, Empires of Eve had sold 15,000 copies.
