= Steam Bandits: Outpost =

- Steam Bandits: Outpost logo shown on official site.
- Developer: Iocaine Studios
- Engine: Unity
- Platforms: Windows, Mac OS X, Android, iOS, Linux (after game launch)
- Genres: City Building, Casual
- Modes: Online Singleplayer, Online Multiplayer

Steam Bandits: Outpost is a 2012 free-to-play steam punk themed city building and indie game by American developer Iocaine Studios. The title is the first one planned out of three, all taking place in the same game world with the goal of eventually allowing players of one game to interact with players of the other two.

== Gameplay ==
In Steam Bandits: Outpost, players are tasked with building up, developing, and overseeing towns on various floating islands in the game world. Along the way, players can recruit a variety of airship captains to complete campaigns and missions, duel other players, or cooperate with friends.

The game is slated to support cross-platform play, allowing players from different platforms to interact with one another.

== Business Model ==
Steam Bandits: Outpost has been marketed as an "anti-Facebook game" and eschews the format of "pay-to-win" and "pay-to-continue" games in favor of a "pay-to-style" system.

Players will be able to use real money to purchase Iocaine points which will allow for the customization of a variety of in-game visual aspects including; city overseer avatar, buildings, airship captain appearance, and pets.

== Development ==
On July 27, 2012, Iocaine Studios began their Kickstarter for Steam Bandits: Outpost. On August 10, 2012, the game met its initial funding goal of $30,000. On August 19, 2012, the game completed its Kickstarter funding, raising a total of $55,362.

The game has not had an update or comment on progress from Iocaine Studios since March 21, 2021.
