= Radio the Universe =

Upcoming video game

- Steam thumbnail artwork
- Developer: 6E6E6E
- Publisher: 6E6E6E
- Engine: PIXEL2.0
- Platform: Windows
- Genre: Action role-playing game
- Mode: Single-player

Radio the Universe is an upcoming action role-playing game developed and published by 6E6E6E. The game was originally funded via Kickstarter in 2012. A demo of the game was released for the February 2023 Steam Next Fest, the first time the game was playable since it started development more than a decade earlier. Its full release date has yet to be announced.

The game has retro-styled 16-bit graphics, and takes place in a gothic cyberpunk setting, in which the female protagonist wakes up to find herself inside a "skyless and desolate labyrinth-city". Radio the Universe takes place within the city, as well as an area in the outer space beyond it called the Null Module. The playable demo was well-received for its graphics and gameplay.

== Gameplay ==
The main character (left) battles a robotic enemy.

The game features top-down action RPG combat with an emphasis on open world exploration. The player can use both melee and ranged combat, and the player leaves behind their unspent experience points when they die in a similar manner to the Dark Souls games. These points can be spent to improve the character's attributes at upgrade stations. The game also contains boss battles, environmental hazards, and puzzles.

== Plot ==
The main character wakes up to find herself trapped, whether physically, spiritually, or both, within a tower that was long abandoned and taken over by mechanoid enemies.

== Development ==
The game was successfully funded on Kickstarter in 2012, exceeding its initial goal of US$12,000 and ultimately reaching a total of $81,719, enough to fulfill all stretch goals and greatly expand the scope of the game. Sixe, an indie developer based in Washington, D.C., credited Castlevania: Symphony of the Night, Hotline Miami, Dark Souls and Yume Nikki as inspirations for the game's design, also comparing the game to The Legend of Zelda and describing it as "dark science fiction".

While the game's original estimated release was in March 2014, the game passed several estimated release dates, including late 2016 and winter 2020, with development still ongoing. A demo of the game was released for the February 2023 Steam Next Fest.

== Reception ==
In response to the game's trailer, Tom Sykes of PC Gamer compared the game's aesthetics and gameplay to Hyper Light Drifter, calling it "gorgeous" and saying that he hoped that it was more "revelatory" than the aforementioned game. Jeffrey Matulef of Eurogamer called it "incredibly polished". In a later review of the game's playable demo, Ted Litchfield of PC Gamer said the game "nails the fundamentals", praising the game's focus on efficiently killing enemies.
