= Pathfinder Online =

Online video game

Pathfinder Online was a MMORPG developed by Goblinworks based on Paizo's Pathfinder Roleplaying Game. Its development suffered from wide layoffs, it was unable to find a major publisher, and the game was shut down on November 28, 2021.

== Development ==
A computer game adaptation of the Pathfinder universe, Pathfinder Online, was announced on November 27, 2012 by Goblinworks and Paizo and was successful in attracting Kickstarter crowdfunding in 2013 to finance its development. An official alpha test was announced in late June 2014. Early enrollment was announced on July 29, 2015.

On September 2, 2015, Lisa Stevens, acting CEO of Goblinworks and CEO of Paizo Publishing announced layoffs of most of the Pathfinder Online development team. As of March 2016, the project was in the process of transitioning to a new developer.

On March 17, 2017, a roadmap for the future development of Pathfinder Online was posted on the Goblinworks blog.

On July 27, 2021, it was announced by Goblinworks that they planned to shut the game down permanently on November 28, 2021, after a finale event.
