= Dyscourse =

2015 video game

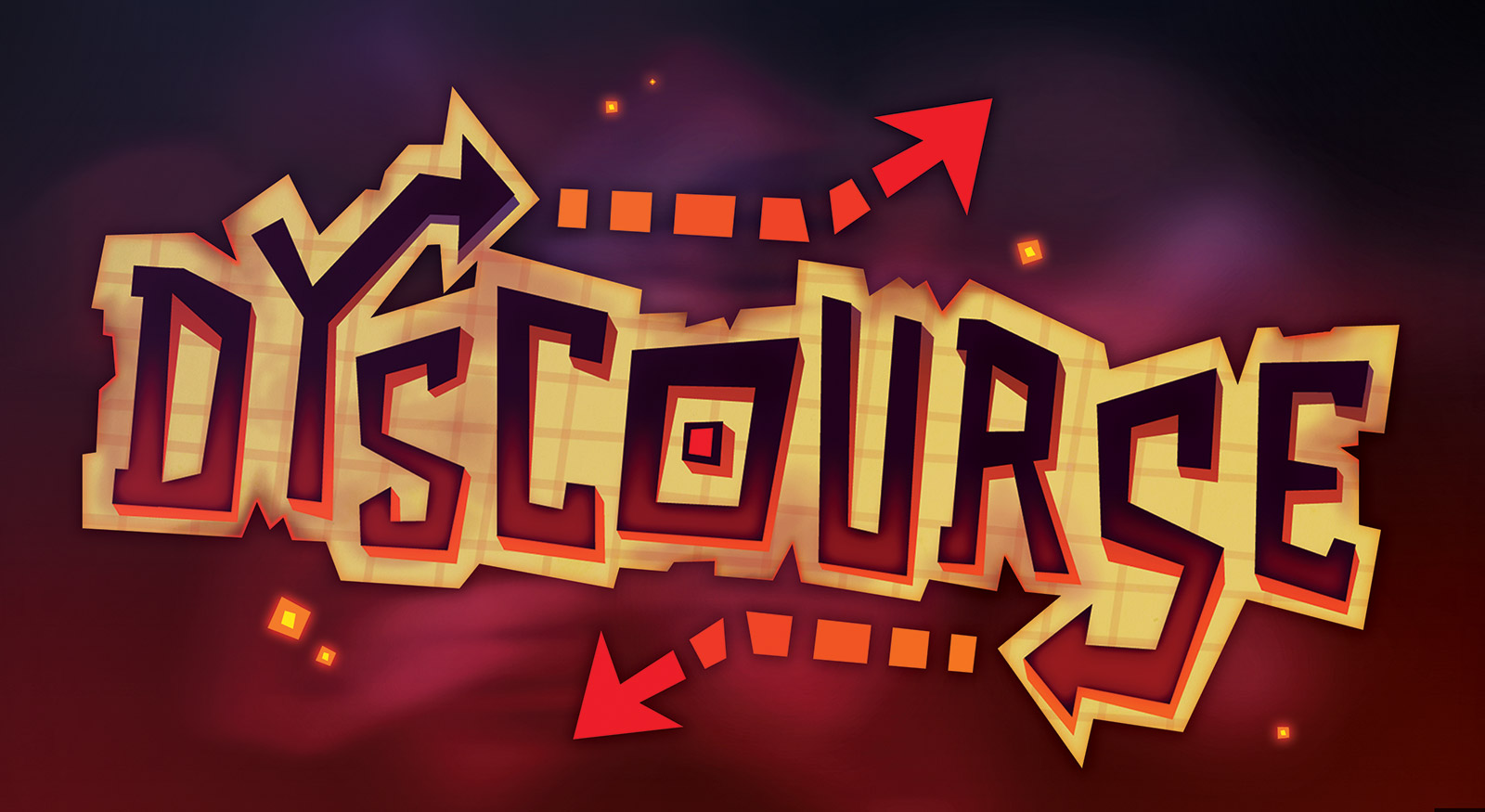
- Developer: Owlchemy Labs
- Publisher: Owlchemy Labs
- Platforms: Linux, Mac, Microsoft Windows
- Release: WW: March 25, 2015
- Genres: Adventure, survival
- Mode: Single-player

Dyscourse is a survival adventure video game developed and published by Owlchemy Labs. It was released on March 25, 2015 for Windows, OS X, and Linux. The game has he player take on the role of Rita, a barista stuck on a desert island after a plane crash. Along with five others, Rita has to lead the group to survive. The game was funded by a Kickstarter campaign, raising over $40,000 from 1,816 backers. Inspirations for the video game are The Oregon Trail, tabletop role-playing game Werewolf: The Apocalypse, and television series Lost.

It received average reviews from video game critics. After its release, Owlchemy Labs switched to creating games made for virtual reality.

== Gameplay ==
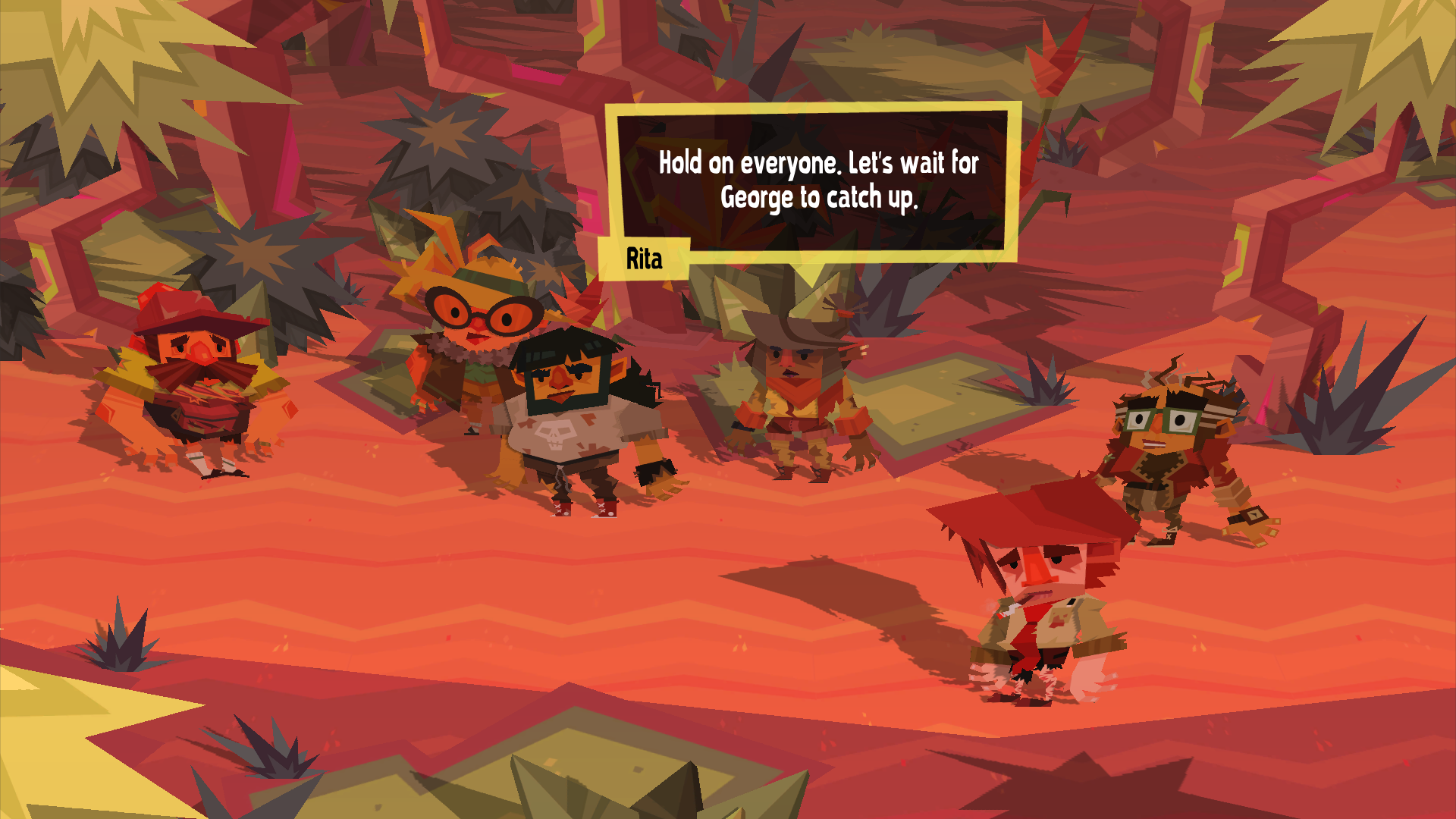
A screenshot of Rita's dialogue

Dyscourse is a survival adventure video game. There are six characters in the game. Rita, an art graduate working as a barista and the game's protagonist; Steve, a pessimist; Teddy, a conspiracy theorist; Garret, a gamer; and George and Jolene, a couple with marital problems. The game is set on a desert island with the six characters being the only survivors of a plane crash. The leadership of the group falls to Rita, allowing the player to make decisions about the group's actions. The choices have effects on the other survivors, including potentially triggering events that lead to their death. The game has numerous potential outcomes depending on the choices made by player, in which all, some, or none of the survivors are rescued by the end of the game. The player is encouraged to replay the game to make different decisions and in turn to obtain alternate endings.

A "memory marker" system is also used, which allows Rita or the other survivors to revisit areas without the need of a map. After completing the game for the first time, the player unlocks the "Day Rewind" feature, which allows players to go back to the beginning of the day.

An additional mode in the game, Indie Island, was later added as downloadable content. This mode offers a similar scenario to the main game. The player controls Emily Park, a game developer on her way to the Game Developers Conference for the first time. The plane on which she is traveling crashes on a desert island with ten indie developers, including Tim Schafer, Edmund McMillen, and Robin Hunicke, who have twelve hours to get off the island before they miss the conference.

== Development and release ==
The game was developed by Owlchemy Labs. The developer's previous works included 2011's Snuggle Truck and 2012's Jack Lumber. Dyscourse was first conceived at an "IndieCabin" retreat with Owlchemy Labs founder Alex Schwartz, CTO Devin Reimer, and artist Carrie Witt. A Kickstarter campaign was launched on November 6, 2013 with a minimum funding goal of $40,000. The Kickstarter ended on December 6 successfully, raising $44,134 from 1,816 backers. The developer described the game as "Lord of the Flies plus a choose-your-own-adventure book, with a dash of Lost, and a sprinkle of The Walking Dead (minus the zombies), crafted with the humour and style Owlchemy Labs is known for." In addition to The Walking Dead, the game's influences include the tabletop role-playing game Werewolf: The Apocalypse and the video game The Oregon Trail. Taking between 60 and 80 minutes to complete, the game contains about 80,000 words of text, with a typical playthrough seeing around fifteen percent of these. The game was shown at the 2014 SXSW gaming showcase.

"Is it that you're more fearful of what's in the forest and desert at night, or is it that the other humans that are with you are more dangerous?"

— Alex Schwartz, founder of Owlchemy Studios on the concept of psychological survival in Dyscourse.

Dyscourse was released to Steam on March 25, 2015. To promote the game, Owlchemy Labs hid thumb drives containing Steam keys for the game all over the United States. One hundred of the keys were hidden in a tree on Hawaii 2, an island in Maine that was bought by the producers of card game Cards Against Humanity. In May 2015, Owlchemy Labs joined forces with the subscription box company IndieBox to offer an exclusive, individually-numbered, physical version of Dyscourse. The limited collector's edition included a flash-drive with a DRM-free copy of the game, official soundtrack, instruction manual, Steam key, and various custom-designed collectibles. After the game's release, Schwartz told GamesIndustry.biz that Dyscourse would be Owlchemy Labs' last game made "for 2D monitors", with future titles being made for virtual reality.

== Reception ==
Reception

Aggregate score
Aggregator	Score
Metacritic	71/100

Review scores
Publication	Score
Destructoid	7/10
GameSpot	7/10
Eurogamer Italy	7/10
Good Game	7/10

Dyscourse received "mixed or average reviews", according to video game review score aggregator Metacritic. Destructoid's Darren Nakamura found the game's brevity to be warranted. Don Saas, writing for GameSpot, praised the game's writing and its "storybook visuals". Steven "Bajo" O'Donnell and Stephanie "Hex" Bendixsen from the Australian television gaming program Good Game both gave the title three and a half stars, with the final rating being a seven out of ten.
