= A Vampyre Story =

2008 video game

- Developer: Autumn Moon Entertainment
- Publishers: Crimson Cow; The Adventure Company; Jordan Freeman Group
- Designers: Bill Tiller; Dave Harris
- Composer: Pedro Macedo Camacho
- Engine: Panda3D
- Platforms: Microsoft Windows, Mac OS X
- Release: EU: November 21, 2008; NA: December 2, 2008
- Genre: Adventure
- Mode: Single-player

A Vampyre Story is a 2008 point-and-click adventure game developed by Autumn Moon Entertainment for Windows and published by Crimson Cow. The game is set in Europe during the 1890s, and follows a young female opera singer turned vampire as she attempts to make the journey back home to Paris in search of fame and normality. The title's distinctive spelling of vampire with a y was derived from the seminal western vampire tale The Vampyre by John Polidori.

== Gameplay ==
A Vampyre Story was created by a number of former LucasArts adventure game developers, and is similar to some of their previous games (such as The Curse of Monkey Island or The Dig) in presentation and style. As such, the game uses a point-and-click interface with a context-sensitive radial cursor, much the same as Monkey Island: upon clicking an interactive item, a graphic menu will appear around the object, displaying the available actions and abilities. As the game progresses, Mona will gradually learn how to use her new supernatural abilities. Consequently, her newfound powers and weaknesses will play a large role in the game's puzzles, requiring Mona to use her abilities to overcome certain challenges and progress through the game.

== Plot ==
Mona De Lafitte, the game's protagonist, is a young and talented Parisian opera student who becomes the object of obsession for a rather pathetic vampire. As a result, Mona is swiftly kidnapped and taken to his castle in Draxsylvania, where she is turned into an undead vampire. Mona must find a way to return home and fulfill her dream of becoming a famous opera singer, while also dealing with the unfamiliar problems inherent in her new condition. Mona is not alone throughout the adventure however, but is followed by her newly acquired and sarcastic sidekick, Froderick the bat.

The game is divided into two main areas: Castle Warg — the home of her kidnapper, Shrowdy von Kieffer, and his mother, the Baroness Vasilia von Kieffer — and the town of Vlad's Landing.

== Development ==
A Vampyre Story was first announced in the June 2004 issue of The Inventory, an online adventure gaming magazine, as the winner of their "Most-Awaited Adventure Game" award. The game was originally given a tentative release date of Halloween 2006, but the loss of publisher backing in April 2005 left the game in unpaid preproduction for the following year. During this time Bill Tiller, Autumn Moon's founder and creative director, generally worked with no more than one or two other people on staff at any one time. This helped to reduce the cost of production while the project was still unfunded. In early July 2006 however, Autumn Moon announced that they had finally acquired a new publisher for A Vampyre Story, the Hamburg-based Crimson Cow, and that full production on the game would begin shortly thereafter, stating an expected 2007 release. In September 2007 however, the first trailer for A Vampyre Story was released, specifying a new date of early 2008. While Autumn Moon has mentioned their interest in the Nintendo DS and Wii as potential release platforms, these were later cancelled.

A "Super Digital Deluxe Edition" was released by Jordan Freeman Group on ZOOM-Platform.com on March 31, 2023. In addition to the game, a number of bonus content items, such as concept art and behind the scenes photos, are included. The game would also be re-released via Steam on July 30, 2023.

== Audio ==
The A Vampyre Story Original Soundtrack was composed and produced by Pedro Macedo Camacho, featuring soprano vocals by Carla Isabel Moniz and violin solos by Carlos Freitas. The soundtrack was released as an extra to the collector's edition of the game. According to an article in Develop Magazine, and an interview in The Pumpkin Post, John Williams’ work on the Harry Potter film series and Michael Land's work on the Monkey Island series were Camacho's main influences.

Several websites mentioned the soundtrack as one of the game's best features and described it as 'absolutely fantastic', 'memorable and melancholy', 'great', and 'ingenious'.

== Reception ==
A Vampyre Story was commercially unsuccessful. The Los Angeles Times reported in 2013 that it "sold between 30,000 and 35,000 copies, well short of the expectations to move 80,000 units."

== Sequel and prequel ==
A Vampyre Story was intended as the opening chapter of a larger saga, and Autumn Moon Entertainment commenced production on the sequel prior to the game's release. A Vampyre Story 2: A Bat's Tale was described as picking up directly after the events of A Vampyre Story, which ended with a cliffhanger. Originally slated for a release in 2009 or 2010 - a much quicker turnaround than the first installment - the sequel's development has been indefinitely stalled due to budgetary contentions between Autumn Moon and the game's publisher, Crimson Cow Games.

With the publishing rights to the sequel owned by Crimson Cow, Autumn Moon decided to work independently on an episodic prequel called A Vampyre Story: Year One. The series will depict Mona's first year of captivity in Castle Warg, including her introduction to Froderick the bat. Bill Tiller initially announced the project in 2010, stating that he was working on the game in his free time. He later considered collaborating with MunkyFun, where he was at the time working as the studio's art director and which had previously been commissioned to assist in the building of Autumn Moon's graphic adventure engine.

Ultimately, Tiller announced that he would attempt to get the game funded via Kickstarter, and launched the project on June 1, 2013. Though the campaign proved unsuccessful, Tiller and a skeleton crew from the previous Autumn Moon games decided to keep the project going. The effort to convert the Autumn Moon engine to Unity led to Duke Grabowski: Mighty Swashbuckler!.

== See also ==
- Runaway: A Twist of Fate – cartoon adventure game released around the same time
- So Blonde – cartoon adventure game from the same year
