= A Vampyre Story: Year One =

Vampyre Story

- Promotional art featuring Mona
- Developer: Autumn Moon Entertainment
- Designer: Bill Tiller
- Composer: Pedro Macedo Camacho
- Engine: Unity
- Platform: Microsoft Windows
- Genre: Adventure
- Mode: Single-player

A Vampyre Story: Year One is a discontinued episodic point-and-click adventure game prequel to A Vampyre Story, formerly in development by Autumn Moon Entertainment for Windows. The game would have consisted of up to four self-contained episodes. Each episode would have taken place during one of the four seasons of the year. Autumn Moon attempted to crowd fund the game in 2013, but the Kickstarter campaign was unsuccessful. However, the game was still in development for a while.

== Gameplay ==
Like its predecessor, A Vampyre Story: Year One would have used a point-and-click interface with a context-sensitive radial cursor, much the same as The Curse of Monkey Island.

== Plot ==
The game would have followed Mona De Lafitte, at a point when she has just recently been imprisoned in Castle Warg, the castle she escaped from in the first game. The game would have begun when she first meets the bat who will become her sidekick, Froderick.

== Development ==
After developing two graphic adventure games under his Autumn Moon studio, Bill Tiller found himself unable to attract publishers to invest in additional titles, and proceeded to take other jobs in the industry. With development of A Vampyre Story 2: A Bat's Tale stalled due to financial problems with its publisher Crimson Cow Games, Tiller conceived of a prequel as an opportunity to continue to work on the franchise independently as well as fill in the backstory between the Mona and Froderick characters.

A Vampyre Story: Year One was first announced in October 2010 as an episodic adventure game that was intended to be released on iPad first, with a PC version following afterward. Later, it was verified that the game would be targeting Windows first, with other platforms a later possibility.

In April 2012, Bill expressed an interest in exploring crowdfunding to complete development due to the success of Broken Age on the Kickstarter platform. He considered collaborating with MonkeyFun, a studio that had previously assisted in the development of Autumn Moon's engine and where Bill served a stint as an art director, but they were ultimately not interested in a graphic adventure game.

The modest team finally launched their Kickstarter project on June 1, 2013, using for their pitch video a three-minute cinematic starring the game's cast. The campaign's goal was for US$200,000, which would fund the first of up to four self-contained episodes as well as upgrading the existing Autumn Moon engine to Unity. It was also confirmed that Pedro Macedo Camacho would reprise his role as composer. Tiller speculated that the campaign could serve to raise awareness for the franchise that he hoped might elevate Crimsom Cow's willingness to resume production of A Vampyre Story 2: A Bat's Tale.

In July 2013, after the Kickstarter campaign proved unsuccessful, Tiller stated that development of A Vampyre Story: Year One would continue without funding. The team proceeded with the effort to convert their engine to Unity, creating a tech demo that would become Duke Grabowski: Mighty Swashbuckler!.
