= Panda3D =

Software game engine

- Logo for Panda3D.
- Developers: Disney Interactive until 2010, Walt Disney Imagineering, Carnegie Mellon University
- Release: 2002; 24 years ago
- Stable release: 1.10.16 / 25 December 2025; 10 months ago
- Written in: C++, C, Python
- Operating system: Microsoft Windows, Linux, macOS, FreeBSD
- Type: Game engine
- License: Revised BSD (Panda3D License for versions before May 28, 2008)
- Website: www.panda3d.org
- Repository: github.com/panda3d/panda3d

Panda3D is a game engine that includes graphics, audio, I/O, collision detection, and other abilities relevant to the creation of 3D games. Panda3D is free, open-source software under the revised BSD license.

Panda3D's intended game-development language is Python. The engine itself is written in C++ and utilizes an automatic wrapper-generator to expose the complete functionality of the engine in a Python interface. This approach gives a developer the advantages of Python development, such as rapid development and advanced memory management, but keeps the performance of a compiled language in the engine core. For instance, the engine is integrated with Python's garbage collector, and engine structures are automatically managed.

The manual and the sample programs use Python by default, with C++ available as an alternative. Both languages are fully supported. Python is the most commonly used language by developers, but C++ is also common.

The users of Panda3D include the developers of several large commercial games, a few open source projects, and a number of university courses that leverage Panda3D's short learning curve.

== History ==
The Disney VR studio is a branch of Disney that was created to build 3D attractions for Disney theme parks. They built an attraction called "Aladdin's Magic Carpet," and the engine they created for that eventually became Panda3D. The engine in its current form bears little resemblance to those early years. Over time, Panda3D was used for additional VR rides at Disney theme parks, and was eventually used in the creation of Toontown Online, an online game set in a cartoon world, and later for the second MMORPG, Pirates of the Caribbean Online.

In 2002, the engine was released as open source. According to the authors, this was so that they "could more easily work with universities on Virtual Reality research projects." However, it took some time for Panda3D to take off as an open-source project. From the article:

The system, although quite usable by the team that developed it, was not quite "open source ready." There were several interested users, but building and installing the system was incredibly complex, and there was little in the way of documentation or sample code, so there was no significant open source community right away.

However, the open-sourcing of the engine allowed Carnegie Mellon's Entertainment Technology Center to join in the development of the engine. While Disney engineers continued to do the bulk of the development, the Carnegie-Mellon team built a role for itself polishing the engine for public consumption, writing documentation, and adding certain high-end features such as shaders.

Panda3D's name was once an acronym: "Platform Agnostic Networked Display Architecture." However, since that phrase has largely lost its meaning, the word "Panda3D" is rarely thought of as an acronym any more.

== Design ==
Panda3D is a scene graph engine. This means that the virtual world is initially an empty Cartesian space into which the game programmer inserts 3D models. Panda3D does not distinguish between "large" 3D models, such as the model of an entire dungeon or island, and "small" 3D models, such as a model of a table or a sword. Both large and small models are created using a standard modeling program such as Blender, 3ds Max, or Maya. The models are then loaded into Panda3D and inserted into the Cartesian space.

The Panda3D scene graph exposes the functionality of OpenGL and DirectX in a fairly literal form. For instance, OpenGL and DirectX both have fog capabilities. To enable fog in Panda3D, one simply stores the fog parameters on a node in the scene graph. The fog parameters exactly match the parameters of the equivalent calls in the underlying APIs. In this way, Panda3D can be seen as a thin wrapper around the lower-level APIs. Where it differs from them is that it stores the scene, whereas OpenGL and DirectX do not. Of course, it also provides higher-level operators, such as loading models, executing animations, detecting collisions, and the like.

Panda3D was first engineered before the existence of vertex and pixel shaders. It acquired support for manually written shaders in 2005. However, users have been slow to leverage modern per-pixel lighting techniques in their games. The developers theorize that this is because shader programming can be quite difficult, and that many game developers want the engine to handle it automatically.

To remedy this situation, the Panda3D developers have recently given Panda3D the ability to synthesize shaders automatically. This synthesis occurs if the 3D modeler marks a model for per-pixel lighting, or if the modeler applies a normal map, gloss map, self-illumination map, or other capability that exceeds the capabilities of the fixed-function pipeline. The intent of the synthesis is to render the model as the modeler intended, without any intervention from the programmer.

== Non-graphical capabilities ==
Panda3D provides capabilities other than 3D rendering. Chief among these are:

- Performance analysis tools
- Scene graph exploration tools
- Debugging tools
- A complete art export/import pipeline
- 3D Audio, using either FMOD, OpenAL or Miles Sound System
- Collision detection
- Physics system, and full integration for the Open Dynamics Engine and Bullet integration
- Keyboard and Mouse support
- Support for I/O devices
- Finite state machines
- Networking
- Artificial intelligence

== Software license ==
=== Summary ===
Panda3D is open source and is, as of May 28, 2008, free software under the revised BSD license. Releases prior to that date are not considered free software due to certain errors in the design of the old Panda3D license. Despite this, those older releases of Panda3D can also be used for both free and commercial game development at no financial cost.

=== Evolution ===
In 2002, when the engine was open sourced, the goal of the developers was to create a free software license. However, the license had a few flaws that made it non-free: it arguably required submitting changes to Panda.Project@Disney.com, and it explicitly prohibited the export of the software to various nations against which the United States had trade embargoes.

On May 28, 2008, the trunk of Panda3D development switched to the BSD license. However, old releases still use the old license.

Panda3D makes use of several third-party libraries whose licenses are not free software, including FMOD, Nvidia Cg, DirectX, and MFC. Most of these modules can be easily excluded from the installation, however.

== Projects employing Panda3D ==
- Toontown Online (defunct) and their private servers
- Pirates of the Caribbean Online (defunct) and their private servers
- Ghost Pirates of Vooju Island
- A Vampyre Story
- Dungeon Rampage

== See also ==
- Blender Game Engine
- Pygame
- VRPN
