= Ghost Pirates of Vooju Island =

2009 video game

- Developer: Autumn Moon Entertainment
- Publisher: Dtp entertainment
- Designer: Bill Tiller
- Composers: Pedro Macedo Camacho; Eduardo Tarilonte; Jonathan vd Wijngaarden
- Engine: Panda3D
- Platform: Microsoft Windows
- Release: GER: November 2009; EU: February 19, 2010; NA: August 30, 2010
- Genre: Graphic adventure game
- Mode: Single-player

Ghost Pirates of Vooju Island is an adventure game developed by Autumn Moon Entertainment and released in 2009. The concept and design were created by William 'Bill' Tiller, who was also responsible for the visual look of The Curse of Monkey Island. The game was released in November 2009 in Germany, throughout the rest of Europe on February 19, 2010, and finally in the United States on August 30, 2010 by German publisher dtp entertainment. The game is built on the open-source Panda3D game engine.

The game had limited commercial success but was nonetheless followed by a small crowdfunded spinoff, Duke Grabowski: Mighty Swashbuckler!

== Gameplay ==
The gameplay follows standard point-and-click adventure games. Having been cursed, the three protagonists -- Papa Doc, Jane Starling and Blue Belly - are able to interact with the world directly or as ghosts. As ghosts, they are capable of moving through walls and manipulating things without being seen or heard. However they are unable to pass through or touch "ghost warding barriers" such as lines of salt. In normal human form, the characters can use individual sets of skills, communicate telepathically and switch player characters to solve certain puzzles. Of the three playable characters, Papa Doc is a "Vooju" priest with expertise in reading hieroglyphics, Jane Starling is a nimble pirate and forger, and Blue Belly is skilled in cooking.

== Plot ==
The protagonists must try to prevent the resurrection of a demon god, which is being orchestrated by Papa Doc's wife, the Vooju witch Queen Zimbi, aided by the pirate crew of Greenbeard and an army of zombies. After Zimbi captures the pirate king Flint and knocks out the three protagonists, they find themselves cursed with their souls separated from their bodies.

In the first part of the game, the three protagonists have to find a way to reacquire their bodies, reattach their souls, and obtain a ship in order to leave Vooju island and seek help. They have to do so before they are turned into zombies or before the cock crows thrice, otherwise they are forever lost as ghosts.

In the second part of the game, the three have to gather allies and stop Greenbeard's attempt to attack Blue Belly's home port. In the final part of the game the three heroes must defeat Zimbi's evil mother Mama Malidei and stop the demon god's resurrection.

== Reception ==
Reception

Aggregate scores
Aggregator	Score
GameRankings	69% (12 reviews)
Metacritic	66 / 100 (14 reviews)

Review scores
Publication	Score
Adventure Gamers	3.5 out of 5
GamesTM	7 out of 10
GameZone	5 out of 10
PC Format	71%
PC Gamer (UK)	47%
PC Zone	48%

This game received mixed reviews and had limited commercial success. GameRankings gave it a 69% based on 12 reviews, and Metacritic gave it a 66 out of 100 based on 14 reviews.
