= Duke Grabowski: Mighty Swashbuckler! =

2016 video game

- Developer: Venture Moon Industries
- Publisher: Alliance Digital Media
- Designer: Bill Tiller
- Composer: Pedro Macedo Camacho
- Engine: Unity
- Platforms: macOS, Windows, Linux, Ouya
- Release: macOS, Windows; October 6, 2016; Linux; October 17, 2016; Android; December 12, 2016
- Genre: Adventure
- Mode: Single-player

Duke Grabowski: Mighty Swashbuckler! is a point-and-click adventure game spinoff of Ghost Pirates of Vooju Island, developed by Venture Moon Industries for Windows, macOS, Linux, and Android via Ouya. In August 2014, a crowdfunding campaign was launched to fund the title, originally envisioned for a modest two-to-four hours of gameplay. As it neared completion, however, the game found a publisher and additional episodes are planned. The first episode was released on October 6, 2016.

== Gameplay ==
Duke Grabowski, Mighty Swashbuckler! employs a traditional point-and-click interface, with gameplay consisting of solving inventory and dialogue puzzles.

== Plot ==
The game follows Duke Grabowski, a brutish pirate who must convince his crew that he has what it takes to become a captain.

== Development ==
In 2013, Autumn Moon Entertainment made an unsuccessful attempt to crowdfund, via Kickstarter, A Vampyre Story: Year One. A key objective of the project was to convert the company's proprietary engine to Adventure Creator, an extension of Unity.

Despite the failure of the Kickstarter, the team, consisting of Bill Tiller, Gene Mocsy and Jeremiah Grant, decided to continue the effort without funding. Duke Grabowski began as a proof of concept for the new engine, but the team found the character so enjoyable that they decided to expand the tech demo into a complete, albeit small, adventure game. In August 2014, a Kickstarter was launched with a modest goal of $40,000, which it narrowly achieved.

Despite being developed by the core creative team of Autumn Moon, the game is being released under a new label, Venture Moon Industries. The three developers formed this company so that they would share ownership of the property, whereas Autumn Moon is owned by Bill Tiller. Since Duke Grabowski is a spin-off of Ghost Pirates of Vooju Island, Tiller is licensing the IP to Venture Moon through Autumn Moon.

Also contributing to the project are LucasArts adventure veterans Alyssa Clark, Dave Grossman, and Larry Ahern, the latter two making cameo appearances in the game. The soundtrack will consist of selections from the Ghost Pirates score composed by Pedro Macedo Camacho as well as new music by Jared Emerson-Johnson.

In May 2016, Venture Moon announced that the game had reached an agreement with a publisher, Alliance Digital Media. The partnership allowed the team to work on the game full-time, and broadened the scope of the project as well - Duke Grabowski was expanded into an episodic series, with the game that was originally crowdfunded serving as a self-contained first episode.
