= Bill Tiller =

American computer game designer and writer

- Born: November 1, 1967 (age 58)
- Occupations: Game designer, writer, artist

William Tiller is an American computer game designer, writer, and artist. At LucasArts, he was the lead artist and art director of The Dig, the lead background artist on The Curse of Monkey Island, and the lead artist on Indiana Jones and the Infernal Machine. He created the games A Vampyre Story and Ghost Pirates of Vooju Island for Autumn Moon Entertainment, a studio he co-founded with Mike Kirchoff in 2002. He worked as a game designer on the iOS title Perils of Man.

== Career ==
Tiller was hired by LucasArts adventure games by Collette Michaud in 1992 as an animator for Brian Moriarty's version of The Dig. He stayed with the project through all of its incarnations, and was ultimately the lead artist and art director on the final version of the game. He was the lead background artist of The Curse of Monkey Island, and the lead artist of Indiana Jones and the Infernal Machine. In 2001, he left LucasArts to work at ArenaNet.

In 2002, co-founded Autumn Moon Entertainment to develop his own adventure games. Their first release was A Vampyre Story in 2008, followed by Ghost Pirates of Vooju Island in 2009. Due to financial issues with the publisher of the Autumn Moon games, Crimson Cow, Tiller has maintained a freelance career in the industry. His royalty checks from his work on Snuggle Truck has allowed Tiller to keep working on his own adventure games. Before the success of Snuggle Truck, Tiller served as the art director for MunkyFun, which is itself a studio founded by a number of ex-LucasArts developers. In 2013, Tiller started a crowdfunding effort for an episodic, independent prequel to the A Vampyre Story saga called A Vampyre Story: Year One. The Kickstarter campaign was unsuccessful, however, the game remains in development. In 2013, Tiller collaborated with IF Games in Switzerland as one of the game designers for the 3D adventure Perils of Man, which saw release in 2014. In August 2014, Bill Tiller began a Kickstarter campaign for a spin-off of Ghost Pirates of Vooju Island titled Duke Grabowski: Mighty Swashbuckler!.

== Games ==
- 1993: Star Wars: Rebel Assault, artist (LucasArts)
- 1994: Super Star Wars: Return of the Jedi, artist (LucasArts)
- 1994: Indiana Jones' Greatest Adventures, artist (LucasArts)
- 1995: Full Throttle, artist (LucasArts)
- 1995: The Dig, lead artist, art director (LucasArts)
- 1997: Outlaws, artist (LucasArts)
- 1997: The Curse of Monkey Island, lead background artist (LucasArts)
- 1999: Indiana Jones and the Infernal Machine, lead artist (LucasArts)
- 2002: The Lord of the Rings: The Two Towers, concept artist (Stormfront Studios)
- 2008: A Vampyre Story, project leader, artist, writer (Autumn Moon Entertainment)
- 2009: Ghost Pirates of Vooju Island, project leader, artist, writer (Autumn Moon Entertainment)
- 2011: Bounty Bots, art director (Munky Fun)
- 2011: Snuggle Truck, artist (Owlchemy Labs)
- 2013: Jack Lumber, artist (Owlchemy Labs)
- 2014: Perils of Man, game designer (IF Games)
- 2015: Skylanders: Imaginators, senior concept artist (Activision)
- 2016: Duke Grabowski: Mighty Swashbuckler!, project leader, artist, writer (Venture Moon Industries)
