= The Diplomat (American TV series) =

Political thriller series (2023–present)

- Genre: Drama; Political thriller
- Created by: Debora Cahn
- Starring: Keri Russell; Rufus Sewell; David Gyasi; Ali Ahn; Rory Kinnear; Ato Essandoh; Nana Mensah; Bradley Whitford; Allison Janney
- Music by: Nathan Barr; Dimitri Smith; Marcelo Zarvos
- Country of origin: United States
- Original language: English
- No. of seasons: 4
- No. of episodes: 30

Production
- Executive producers: Debora Cahn; Janice Williams; Keri Russell; Simon Cellan Jones; Peter Noah; Eli Attie; Alex Graves
- Producers: Daniel Toland; Russ Hammonds; Amanda Johnson-Zetterström; Nishchal Shome; Pam Roberts
- Cinematography: Julian Court; Philipp Blaubach; Giorgio Scali; David Franco
- Editors: Gary Levy; Agnes Grandits
- Running time: 41–56 minutes
- Production companies: Let's Not Turn This Into a Whole Big Production; Well Red

Original release
- Network: Netflix
- Release: April 20, 2023 – present

The Diplomat is an American political thriller television series created by Debora Cahn. First airing in 2023, it stars Keri Russell as a veteran US diplomat who is unexpectedly appointed as the ambassador to the United Kingdom amid an emerging international crisis.

The series premiered on Netflix on April 20, 2023. The second, third, and fourth seasons followed in October 2024, 2025, and 2026, respectively. On October 29, 2026, the series was renewed for a fifth season.

The Diplomat has received critical acclaim for its writing, pacing, and performances, particularly those of Keri Russell, Rufus Sewell and (beginning in season 2) Allison Janney. The series has been nominated for ten Primetime Emmy Awards, including twice for Outstanding Drama Series. Russell has won an Actor Award and has been nominated for three Primetime Emmy Awards and three Golden Globe Awards, while Janney has won a Primetime Emmy Award.

The show has been praised for its nuanced portrayal of foreign policy and the often invisible work of diplomacy, as well as its character-driven storytelling that blends political intrigue with personal drama and elements of romantic comedy.

== Premise ==
The series centers on Kate Wyler, the new US ambassador to the United Kingdom, as she helps to defuse an international crisis, forges strategic alliances and adjusts to her new place in the spotlight. She also manages her deteriorating marriage to fellow career diplomat Hal Wyler.

== Cast ==
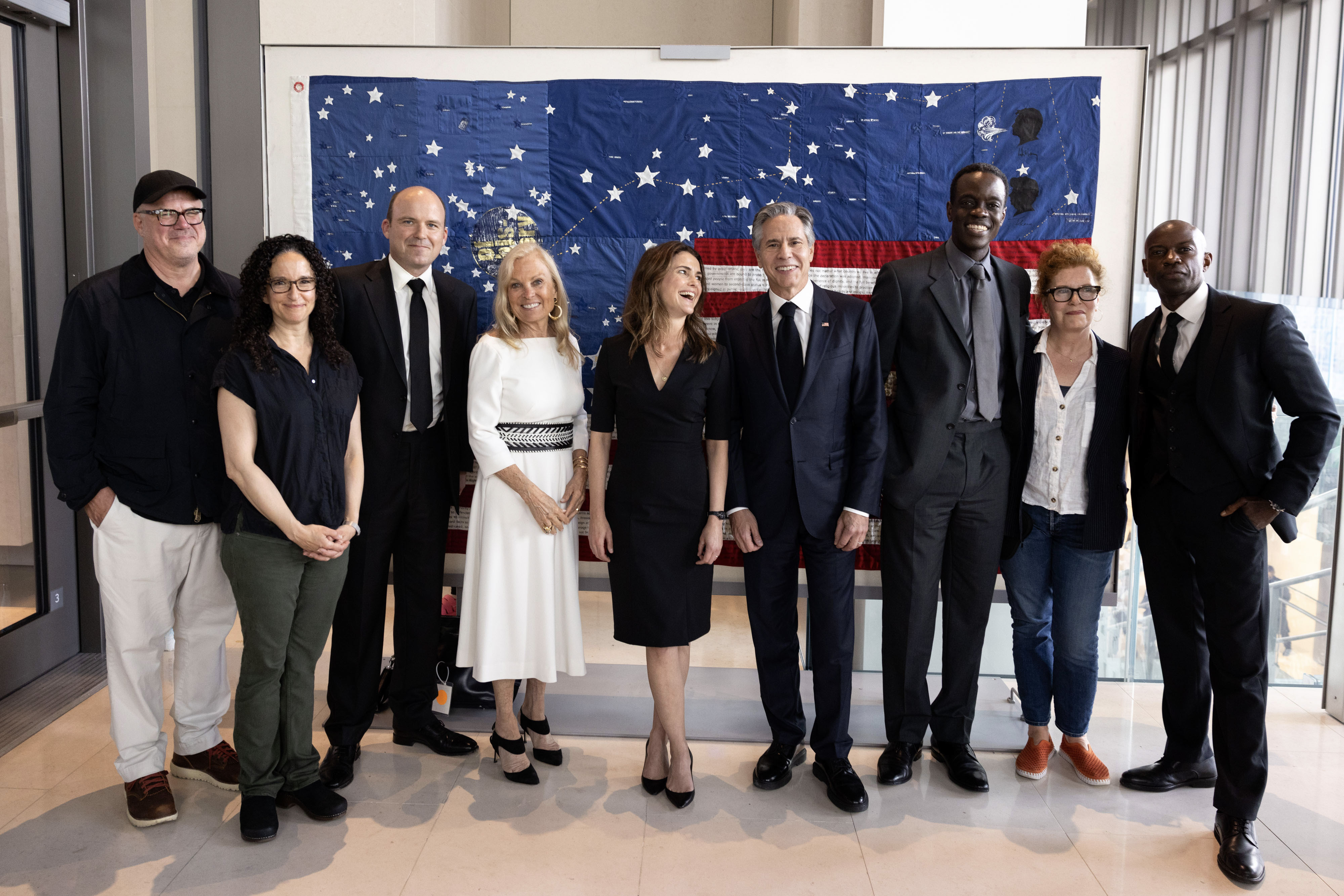
Then-Secretary of State Antony Blinken and Ambassador Jane Hartley met the cast and producers of The Diplomat at the US Embassy in London in 2023.

=== Main ===
- Keri Russell as Katherine "Kate" Wyler, newly appointed US Ambassador to the UK
- Rufus Sewell as Hal Wyler, Kate's husband and former US Ambassador to Lebanon and Iraq, later Vice President of the United States
- David Gyasi as Austin Dennison, UK Foreign Secretary (seasons 1–3)
- Ali Ahn as Eidra Park, CIA London Station Chief
- Rory Kinnear as Nicol Trowbridge, UK Prime Minister
- Ato Essandoh as Stuart Hayford, Deputy Chief of Mission of the US Embassy in London
- Nana Mensah as Billie Appiah (season 4; recurring seasons 1–3), White House Chief of Staff
- Bradley Whitford as Todd Penn (season 4; recurring season 3), Grace Penn's husband and First Gentleman of the United States
- Allison Janney as Grace Hagen Penn (season 4; guest season 2; recurring season 3), Vice President of the United States and later President of the United States

=== Recurring ===
- Celia Imrie as Margaret "Meg" Roylin, a former campaign manager of the British Conservative Party (seasons 1–4)
- Miguel Sandoval as Miguel Ganon, United States Secretary of State (seasons 1–4)
- Michael McKean as William Tresselt "Bill" Rayburn, President of the United States (seasons 1–2)
- Penny Downie as Frances Munning, Winfield House residence manager (seasons 1–4)
- Rosaline Elbay as Nora Koriem, Chief of Staff to the Vice President (seasons 2–4)
- Aidan Turner as Callum Ellis, British spy who is Kate's lover, much to Hal’s chagrin (seasons 3–4)

=== Supporting ===
- Pearl Mackie as Alysse, US embassy assistant (seasons 1–2)
- Christine Kavanagh as Gwen Hempill, UK Foreign Affairs Representative
- Jess Chanliau as Ronnie Buckhurst, US embassy officer (season 1)
- Anna Francolini as Pippa
- T'Nia Miller as Cecilia Dennison, Austin Dennison's sister (season 1)
- Richard Dillane as Tom Libby, MI6 Chief
- Rupert Vansittart as Julian Hoope, British diplomat
- David Bark-Jones as Alistair Kemper-Waithe
- Adrienne Warren as CIA officer, alias Georgia (season 2)
- Simon Chandler as Sir Merritt Grove MP (season 1)
- Alysia Reiner as Special Agent Ivy Griffin, head of Penn's Secret Service detail (season 2, guest season 3)
- Bhav Joshi as Anu Kapoor
- Bijan Daneshmand as Rasoul Shahin, Iranian Deputy Minister of Foreign Affairs
- Adam Silver as Howard
- Georgie Henley as Pensy, Winfield House residence assistant
- Joey Eden as Dan
- Reza Diako as Basir
- Sharif Dorani as Parham Najjar, Iranian ambassador to the UK
- Dana Haqjoo as Farid Namazi, deputy Iranian ambassador to the UK
- John Schwab as Roger Post
- Micky Sébastian as Brielle Fournier, French Minister of the Interior
- Pandora Colin as Lydia Trowbridge, Nicol Trowbridge's wife (seasons 2–3)
- Nancy Carroll as Philippa Pemberton, MI5 Director General (seasons 2, 4)
- David Alan Basche as Brad Chapman, a wealthy donor (season 2)
- Clare Burt as Jemma Doud MSP, First Minister of Scotland (season 2)
- Raphael Sbarge as Senator Matthew Pikorski, Chairman of the Committee on Foreign Relations (season 3)
- Damian Young as Governor Robert Synar, Governor of Pennsylvania (season 3)
- Tracy Ifeachor as Thema Aseidu-Dennison (season 3)
- Abigail Marlowe as Foreign Secretary Robyn Palmer (season 4)
- Jodie Whittaker as Prime Minister Bethan Vaughn (season 4)

== Series overview ==
Season	Episodes	Originally released
1	8	April 20, 2023
2	6	October 31, 2024
3	8	October 16, 2025
4	8	October 15, 2026

== Episodes ==
=== Season 1 (2023) ===
No. overall	No. in season	Title	Directed by	Written by	Original release date
1	1	"The Cinderella Thing"	Simon Cellan Jones	Debora Cahn	April 20, 2023
Amid diplomatic tensions between the United States and Iran, the British aircraft carrier HMS Courageous is attacked in the Persian Gulf. Forty-one sailors die. Career diplomat Kate Wyler accepts reassignment as the US ambassador to the UK on the request of US President William Rayburn and White House Chief of Staff Billie Appiah. Arriving in London with her diplomat husband Hal, she is introduced to deputy chief of mission Stuart Hayford and CIA station chief Eidra Park. Appiah asks Hayford to groom Wyler as a potential replacement for the US vice president. Wyler meets British Foreign Secretary Austin Dennison and Prime Minister Nicol Trowbridge. Realizing that Hal arranged the meeting, Kate convinces Secretary of State Miguel Ganon to keep Rayburn from making statements for one day. The US mission discovers that an Iranian military boat was in the carrier's vicinity around the time of the attack. After learning that Ganon is trying to fire her, Wyler agrees to a magazine shoot to boost her profile. Upon discovering that the Wylers are planning to divorce, Hayford discusses Kate's consideration for the vice presidency with Hal. Hal is drugged by unknown assailants and driven away.
2	2	"Don't Call It a Kidnapping"	Simon Cellan Jones	Peter Noah	April 20, 2023
Hal regains consciousness from being drugged and takes a phone call from the deputy foreign minister of Iran, Rasoul Shahin, an acquaintance who stresses that Iran is not the perpetrator of the attack. He claims that a planned assassination of a retired US general (in retaliation for the killing of Qasem Soleimani) was called off to prevent a diplomatic escalation. After his release, Hal informs Eidra of the encounter, while Kate attends a memorial for the fallen sailors. At the event, Trowbridge says to a grieving widow that he will "rain hellfire" on Iran should they be found responsible. This statement goes viral, heightening tensions. Following a vehicle-ramming attack targeting a Muslim family, Eidra decides to relay some of Hal's information to the CIA before it can be fully verified, though Kate is unsure. Rayburn announces a surprise visit to London to meet Trowbridge. Kate opposes the trip but fails to convince Ganon and Dennison. She discovers Hal had tipped off Shahin about his presence in London via a mutual contact in Italy. While awaiting Rayburn's arrival, she implores Hal to leave her; he blurts out the potential vice presidency offer, leaving her stunned.
3	3	"Lambs in the Dark"	Andrew Bernstein	Debora Cahn	April 20, 2023
Kate convinces Rayburn that Iran is not behind the attack by revealing Hal as the source. Kate reaches an agreement with Dennison for a lunch between Rayburn and Trowbridge where the president can in turn convince the prime minister. Eidra learns from Kate that Hal had reached Shahin first. Rayburn intends to send a carrier battle group to escort the British carrier to port, but Kate learns from Dennison that Trowbridge lied about the condition of the carrier to get the Americans involved. Kate talks with Appiah about the vice presidency, slowly warming to the idea. However, after learning Hal floated her name to try to keep their marriage, Kate attacks him. Kate convinces Rayburn to hold off the carrier group, but also tries to resign as ambassador and turn down the vice presidency offer. Rayburn rejects her resignation, and Appiah pretends to not hear her.
4	4	"He Bought a Hat"	Andrew Bernstein	Amanda Johnson-Zetterström	April 20, 2023
Kate, Hayford, and Eidra formulate a plan to send a hidden signal to Iranian intelligence requesting information about the carrier attack. Kate attends a gala where Trowbridge makes a surprise appearance and reveals publicly Rayburn's U-turn, causing a rift in US–UK relations. Iran responds, and Kate has Dennison summon the Iranian ambassador while she secretly makes her way to their meeting. Hayford reveals to Kate that he was a campaign manager alongside Appiah before he grew disillusioned, and subsequently joined the Foreign Service to get out of Washington, D.C. The Iranian ambassador writes down the name Roman Lenkov, head of a Russian mercenary group who appears to have directed and provided funding for the attack, then collapses and later dies. While debriefing later, Dennison accidentally spills a drink on Kate's blouse and begins wiping it off before awkwardly handing over his handkerchief to her. Kate goes home and has sex with Hal.
5	5	"The Dogcatcher"	Liza Johnson	Story by : Mia Chung; Teleplay by : Mia Chung and Anna Hagen and Debora Cahn	April 20, 2023
Kate, Hal, and Hayford attend a meeting at the country house Chevening, hosted by Dennison, to formulate a strategy on Iran and Russia. Trowbridge crashes the meeting and demands a shift to a tough response toward Russia. The group suggests a list of sanctions, but Trowbridge insists on military action. Dennison points out that this might elicit a nuclear response. Hal spends time with Dennison's sister Cecilia, they kiss while skinny dipping in a pond, and Hal confesses the incident to Kate. The Iranian ambassador's death is revealed to be a heart attack, clearing suspicion from Kate and Dennison. Kate shocks the meeting by giving Trowbridge a list of Russian targets.
6	6	"Some Lusty Tornado"	Liza Johnson	Anna Hagen	April 20, 2023
Kate's bombshell derails the meeting and causes Dennison to lose trust in her. Hal takes Kate to raid the kitchen, where they find Trowbridge and share a supper. Kate convinces him to give her a chance to come up with diplomatic responses. Kate, Dennison, and their teams spend the night crafting a package of sanctions on Russian oligarchs, but Trowbridge wants to bomb Russian forces in Syria. Kate and Dennison admit they have feelings for each other. Kate realizes Trowbridge is in contact with former Conservative Party campaign manager Margaret Roylin, who engineered Trowbridge's selection as party leader at the expense of Dennison. Eidra is unable to find the person in the Russian government who gave the order for the attack. With Cecilia's help, Kate talks to Roylin, who explains that Trowbridge needs a show of force to prevent an imminent referendum on Scottish independence from succeeding, and suggests bombing Lenkov fighters in Libya. Trowbridge agrees, but Ganon does not. Hal realizes that Ganon wants to be president and is trying to make Rayburn look bad, and urges Kate to take the plan directly to Rayburn. Hayford and Eidra agree to go public with their relationship. Rayburn overrules Ganon's objection to the plan for military action against Lenkov in Libya.
7	7	"Keep Your Enemies Closer"	Alex Graves	Peter Noah	April 20, 2023
Kate meets with the Russian ambassador, who gives her information that Lenkov will be visiting a villa in southern France. After meeting Appiah, Hal tells Kate that Rayburn intends to fire Ganon. Kate flies back to Washington, D.C. to deliver the information to Rayburn personally, but her attempts to speak are all interrupted in a short, crowded meeting. Rayburn authorizes an operation with the British to arrest Lenkov. Kate meets with a colleague, who tells her that the diplomatic situation in Kabul, Afghanistan, where she was previously assigned, has deteriorated badly. Back in London, Trowbridge expresses his frustration to Kate about the aborted Libya plan.
8	8	"The James Bond Clause"	Alex Graves	Debora Cahn	April 20, 2023
The morning after Trowbridge rejects the plan to arrest Lenkov, Dennison informs Kate that Trowbridge now supports it. They plan to go to Paris to convince the French to support a British special operation. Appiah asks Hayford to tell Eidra that Kate is being considered to replace the vice president. Hayford says that he will go to Washington with Kate if she accepts the post. Eidra feels betrayed by this, recalling that Hayford had persuaded her to refuse a posting in Cairo, and ends their relationship. Kate persuades Hal to deliver a speech at Chatham House in her stead while she is in Paris; he requests that a draft of the speech be sent to Appiah. His speech attracts the attention of Merritt Grove, a Tory MP. On a walk after lunch, Kate tells Dennison that her marriage to Hal is on the rocks. Kate learns that Hal attempted to put Grove in contact with Appiah, and believes that he is maneuvering to become secretary of state. She forbids him from contacting Grove and instructs Hayford to stop him. In Paris, Kate receives approval from the French government for the operation, but learns that Lenkov is to be assassinated by the operatives and not arrested. Kate tells this to Dennison, who still believed that the operation was to be an arrest. Kate says that the only person to benefit from Lenkov's death would be the person who hired him, and they conclude that he was hired by Trowbridge. Later, in London, Hal, Hayford, and US embassy officer Ronnie Buckhurst reach Grove, but are caught in a car-bomb explosion; this leaves Kate devastated. A British man identifying as Dolphin 3–6 later tries to make radio contact, to no avail.

=== Season 2 (2024) ===
No. overall	No. in season	Title	Directed by	Written by	Original release date
9	1	"When a Stranger Calls"	Alex Graves	Story by : Debora Cahn; Teleplay by : Anna Hagen & Debora Cahn	October 31, 2024
Grove is dead, while Hal, Hayford and Ronnie are seriously injured and hospitalized. Kate and Dennison return to London; Dennison tells Kate that Grove has organized donations to the Conservative Party from Russian sources like Lenkov. Kate shares her theory to Eidra that Trowbridge or a high-ranking member of the British government is involved in the bombing and the attack on the carrier. Dennison tries to get MI6 to confirm the kill order for Lenkov, and learns that Roylin is missing, despite Trowbridge's efforts to find her. Hal wakes up. Trowbridge's wife, Lydia, who Trowbridge relies on for advice, warns Dennison to not interfere in Trowbridge's relationship with Roylin. At a COBR meeting, MI5 reveals the bomb was British. Eidra tells Kate she will investigate Trowbridge secretly to shield her from potential blowback. Ronnie dies, while Hayford is conscious but has amnesia of the events before the bombing. Roylin calls Kate.
10	2	"St. Paul's"	Alex Graves	Peter Ackerman	October 31, 2024
Kate, Hal, Dennison and Trowbridge attend Grove's funeral at St Paul's Cathedral. Eidra smuggles Roylin into the service, allowing her to be spotted by Dennison and Trowbridge, then smuggles her out before Trowbridge can confront her. Hal asks Kate if she slept with Dennison. Kate replied she did not, but had planned to in Paris. Dennison tells Kate he is trying to rescind the kill order. Hayford returns to work. Kate arranges a meeting between Dennison and Roylin at the embassy. Roylin says that Lenkov was hired by British extremists opposed to Scottish independence, one of whom was Grove, implies that Grove was killed because of Kate's call to her asking about Grove, and that Dennison is rattling the extremists by investigating the kill order. Kate persuades Dennison to hold off for one day. Eidra keeps Roylin under CIA protection with the aim of extracting more information. Trowbridge unexpectedly arrives at the embassy, and demands from Kate the reason she called Roylin. Kate lies and does not mention Grove. Hayford accuses Kate of causing Ronnie's death through her association with Roylin. Kate and Hal have a fight about the extent of her responsibility in Ronnie's death.
11	3	"The Ides of March"	Tucker Gates	Peter Noah	October 31, 2024
Lenkov is killed by British special forces. Kate and Eidra suspect that Roylin used them to delay Dennison. Hayford favors handing Roylin over to British police. Roylin denies having a role in Lenkov's death. Dennison tells Kate that he has enough votes to pass a motion of no confidence that will force Trowbridge to resign. He asks Kate for permission to deliver the news to Trowbridge at an Independence Day party at Winfield House, which she grants. Eidra tells Kate that while many members of parliament are angry with Trowbridge, the public think he is a hero. Hayford tells Appiah that Kate is not an ideal candidate for vice president. Trowbridge tells Kate that he has been invited to visit Scotland by the First Minister, and he invites Kate and Hal. With Dennison's motion losing support, he tells Kate he intends to resign and expose Trowbridge alone. While trying to leave the party before the fireworks, Hayford is delayed by a woman who has trouble getting her car. Hayford struggles with the explosions of the fireworks due to PTSD, and he invites the woman into his car. Hal also has a similar reaction, and Kate comforts him.
12	4	"The Other Army"	Tucker Gates	Story by : Julianna Dudley Meagher; Teleplay by : Debora Cahn	October 31, 2024
Hayford learns that the woman from the party was a CIA officer sent by Eidra to test him, as Appiah is concerned about his mental state. Eidra admits to recording the interactions between Hayford and the woman, but she did not realize that they had sex while the recording was taking place, which Hayford accidentally admits. Hayford berates Eidra for having recorded them. He also admits to Kate that his resentment toward her is affecting his work; she tells him he needs to decide if he will work with her or leave. With Roylin refusing to talk, Kate persuades Eidra to let Hal talk to Roylin first and screen for relevant information. Hal relays to Kate and Eidra that Trowbridge is not involved in the attack. Roylin confesses that she hired Lenkov, but maintains that the staged false flag attack was supposed to cause little damage. Roylin asked another conspirator, an MP named Stendig, to talk a panicking Grove out of approaching the US for asylum, but Stendig planted the bomb. Kate and Eidra create a plan for Roylin to confess to Trowbridge, then gauge his reaction to judge his innocence. Hal convinces Dennison to not resign and come to Scotland. Hayford retracts his assessment of Kate to Appiah. Hal buys a burner phone and does some investigating of his own, arousing suspicion from Eidra. Roylin confesses to Trowbridge as Kate, Eidra and Dennison observe covertly. Trowbridge, infuriated by Roylin's confession, attacks her, and ends up slamming her head to the ground as the observers rush in to intervene.
13	5	"Our Lady of Immaculate Deception"	Alex Graves	Anna Hagen	October 31, 2024
Trowbridge refuses to take Roylin into custody, leaving Eidra no choice but to keep her under CIA protection over Kate's objection. When Trowbridge questions Kate about the chain of events, he realizes she suspected him of being involved. Kate loses the trust of both Trowbridge and Dennison, while the two men mend their relationship. Eidra's report alarms the CIA director, who wants Roylin out of CIA protection, as well as the White House, which dispatches vice president Grace Penn to London. Kate and Hal travel back to London to join Penn for a meeting with Trowbridge and Dennison to work out a solution. Trowbridge favors burying the story, and Dennison suggests that Eidra send Roylin home. Penn gives Kate a sobering reality check about the vice presidency, causing her to have second thoughts, but Hal dismisses Penn's election chances. Kate nevertheless persuades Penn to consider fighting to stay. Kate wants to call Appiah to support Penn, but Hal prevents it, telling Kate that Penn gave the idea to Roylin to attack the ship.
14	6	"Dreadnought"	Alex Graves	Debora Cahn	October 31, 2024
Hal tells Kate that Rayburn is unaware of Penn's involvement. Kate tells Hayford she intends to become vice president. Trowbridge agrees to have MI6 launch a secret investigation into the conspiracy but ultimately postpones it. Penn tells Kate that Trowbridge called Rayburn to support Penn taking a portfolio overseeing nuclear power, which means Penn will stay as vice president, and she intends to take it. At a dinner where it was to be announced, Hayford manages to get Trowbridge to not mention the portfolio, at Appiah's request. Penn demands an explanation, and Hal reveals they know she gave Roylin the idea to attack the British ship. Penn takes Kate aside for a lecture on the importance of a naval base in Scotland which houses the UK's nuclear arsenal and is also the only base in Europe where US nuclear submarines can dock. If Scotland had gone independent, the US would have lost a vital tool for detecting Russian naval activity. Hal suggests Kate inform Ganon of Penn's involvement, which she eventually agrees with. However, instead of calling Ganon, Hal goes directly to Rayburn via video conference and reveals Penn's role in the affair. Soon afterward, Hal frantically calls Kate, still meeting with Penn (who, during their meeting, accuses Kate of still chasing the vice presidency), telling her that the shock caused Rayburn's death and that Penn is now President of the United States. Kate watches in horror as Secret Service members rush outside to secure the new president.

=== Season 3 (2025) ===
No. overall	No. in season	Title	Directed by	Written by	Original release date
15	1	"Emperor Dead"	Alex Graves	Debora Cahn	October 16, 2025
Penn is informed that she has become president, and that Rayburn died while on a call with Hal. Kate convinces Penn to move to the embassy to hold her swearing-in ceremony instead of remaining at Winfield, and has Eidra interrogate Hal about the circumstances of the call. Appiah announces Rayburn's death while Penn arrives at the embassy, and Hal defends his actions to Penn with Kate's support. Trowbridge calls Kate to announce his intention to attend the ceremony and inform her that the Metropolitan Police will finally take custody of Roylin. Kate also invites Dennison to attend, while Hal tells Hayford to arrange for Kate's return to Washington, D.C. for confirmation as vice president. Penn agrees to offer Roylin asylum, but Roylin declines, saying that she will be safe with Penn as president. Penn is sworn in on an original Gutenberg Bible brought by Trowbridge, but does not make any moves towards nominating Kate as vice president, to which Hal objects. While Roylin, still awaiting transfer, takes a large dose of drugs in a CIA safe house, Penn asks Hal to become her nominee in front of Kate.
16	2	"Last Dance at the Country Club"	Alex Graves	Anna Hagen	October 16, 2025
Hal tries to convince Kate it is a good idea for him to take the vice presidency when she is passed over. A flashback to Baghdad in 2010 occurs, with Hal as US ambassador to Iraq and Kate as his then girlfriend and employee. The State Department wants to appoint Hal as US ambassador to the United Nations International Organizations in Vienna, and he asks Kate to marry him. In the present timeline, Kate struggles with having to resign to become Second Lady of the United States. As a condition for his acceptance as vice president, Hal convinces Appiah to have President Penn appoint Kate as United States Special Envoy for Europe. Roylin kills herself with a drug overdose, putting Eidra's job with the CIA in jeopardy; Kate conveys the news to an enraged Trowbridge. Kate chooses to remain in London as ambassador to the UK, rather than return with Hal to Washington, D.C.
17	3	"The Riderless Horse"	Tucker Gates	Eli Attie	October 16, 2025
Kate, Hal, Appiah, and Penn are in the Oval Office, along with several politicians who are concerned about the arrangement of Kate as ambassador and second lady. Hal and Kate agree to separate and have a "secret divorce". Meanwhile, Hayford arranges a meeting between Kate and the director of the CIA in the hopes that Kate would vouch for Eidra to keep her job, but Kate forgets to attend the meeting. Penn begins to rethink Hal's appointment as vice president, as he has been making unsustainable promises to numerous senators in a potentially successful bid to ratify UNCLOS and deliver Penn a quick political victory. Hal confronts the alternative candidate, Governor Bob Synar of Pennsylvania, at the funeral of President Rayburn, ridiculing Synar's lack of foreign policy knowledge and his position on the F-35 fighter jet. Penn stops considering Synar, and after Kate tells her about Hal's drive for UNCLOS and assures her that he can be reined in, Penn decides to proceed with nominating Hal.
18	4	"Arden"	Tucker Gates	Jessica Brickman	October 16, 2025
Hal Wyler becomes Vice President of the United States and gets UNCLOS ratified. Hal and Kate undergo issues with communication due to their long-distance relationship, with British officials treating Kate as a direct line to the vice president. Kate and Dennison are alone at his home when they begin to kiss each other. Kate urges sexual relations, but Dennison rejects her offer, saying that the timing is wrong. Kate also deals with new challenges as Second Lady of the United States and US ambassador to the UK, as well as complications with her new Secret Service protection detail. Meanwhile, Eidra attends a secret meeting with Dennison and Tom in hopes that it would save her career. During the meeting (and in efforts to oust Trowbridge from power), Dennison asks Eidra if Trowbridge told her to kill Roylin and Eidra says no. Eidra then meets with Kate, and expresses disappointment in the latter's efforts to prevent Eidra's termination.
19	5	"Birdwatchers"	Liza Johnson	Peter Noah	October 16, 2025
Five months later, Kate hosts a multi-lateral event when Hal makes a surprise entrance. He discovers Kate is intimate with another man, Callum Ellis, a British spy who informs Kate of a Russian submarine in distress off the British coast. Hal confronts Kate where she argues they have an understanding, and the three share a tense conversation. Eidra is overwhelmed by her duties as the go between for Russian assets to defect to the United States. Hal and Kate have a private conversation where she reveals her advances toward Dennison were rebuffed and that she has had sex with Callum in the shower at the Ministry of Defence; Kate then leaves the room and goes to her office to cry. In a conversation with Kate, Eidra reveals that a former Lenkov colonel, Boris Andreyev, is claiming the US was responsible for the Courageous bombing. Hal later discloses to Eidra that the US was behind the attack. Hal, Kate, and Eidra board Air Force Two to go to brief President Penn.
20	6	"Amagansett"	Liza Johnson	Peter Ackerman & Debora Cahn	October 16, 2025
The Wylers arrive at the Penns' private residence on Long Island to deal with potential fallout of Andreyev's allegations, along with Appiah. The trip is marked by tension among the two couples, and Todd makes it clear he feels he is playing second fiddle. They decide to secretly fly prime minister Trowbridge to President Penn's beach house to inform Trowbridge of Penn's part in the attack, and agreeing that the two governments will publicly blame Roylin while privately informing Trowbridge of the truth. Todd and Kate believe this will lead to Penn's impeachment. Kate objects to the plan, believing Hal agreed to it because Penn would be impeached and he would become president. Kate later proposes blaming the attack on deceased President Rayburn to avoid the political consequences. Todd brings the idea to Penn and criticizes Appiah's advice. After Trowbridge and Dennison arrive in New York, Penn tells Trowbridge that Rayburn was involved in the bombing. Dennison demands obedience from the US president in order to protect the secret, but Kate declines. Penn and Trowbridge hold a joint press conference where Trowbridge breaks the deal and blames Rayburn for the attack.
21	7	"PNG"	Alex Graves	Julianna Dudley Meagher	October 16, 2025
Hal, Ganon, and Appiah discuss the press conference fallout in the Oval Office, where Hal insists the US should not apologize. Upon her return to the UK, Kate is forced to smuggle herself back into Winfield amid widespread British protests. Kate meets with Callum at Winfield to discuss developments with the Russian submarine, which was found 12 miles off the UK coast. Callum urges Kate to speak with Trowbridge and offer US help retrieving the submarine, but diplomatic channels are closed. When Kate learns Trowbridge added a bilateral meeting with China to his schedule, she worries he will ask the Chinese to help with the submarine, which Callum explains is an unacceptable risk as it is carrying a fully operational Poseidon nuclear torpedo, which is designed to maximize fallout. Hayford, still unaware that Penn and not Rayburn was the mastermind of the conspiracy, calls Appiah suspecting that a scandal involving Todd, which was the reason Penn had been expected to resign from the vice presidency, was manufactured to keep Penn silent. Feeling guilty about the absence of an apology from the US, Kate apologizes for the HMS Courageous attack to Winfield's British residence manager, Frances Munning. After Kate shares news of the doomsday weapon with the White House, President Penn calls Trowbridge and agrees to a summit in the UK.
22	8	"Schrodinger's Wife"	Alex Graves	Debora Cahn	October 16, 2025
President Penn flies to London to meet with Trowbridge to confer her personal apologies for the attack and respond to the nuclear situation. Trowbridge leaves their meeting and refuses to believe Penn's claim. A state dinner is hosted between the Penns, Wylers, Trowbridges, and Dennisons (Austin having married four weeks prior) at Chequers where tensions are eased slightly. Todd asks Penn if she's having an affair with Hal, which she categorically denies. In order to convince Trowbridge, Penn orders US underwater drones into British territorial waters to take photos of the submarine and provide proof to Trowbridge. Trowbridge turns down US assistance, until Hal tells Kate to suggest to Trowbridge that he should bury the submarine in concrete to ensure that no country, not even the US, can access it. After the meeting, Kate begs Hal to take her back as his wife, and Hal agrees. As the delegations prepare to leave, Callum privately tells Kate that he thinks the Russians have retrieved the weapon, as radiation levels around the sub dropped dramatically. Kate tells Hal who confers quietly with Penn, leading Kate to realize that the two had secretly ordered the recovery of the Poseidon weapon before the meeting with Trowbridge and used Kate's suggestion as a cover. As this could lead the Russians to declare war on the British if they assume they took the weapon, Kate confronts Hal, who then tells Penn that Kate has figured it out, to Penn's alarm.

=== Season 4 (2026) ===
No. overall	No. in season	Title	Directed by	Written by	Original release date
23	1	"Windsor"	Alex Graves	Story by : Debora Cahn & Anna Hagen; Teleplay by : Debora Cahn	October 15, 2026
As Hal and Kate argue over the decision to secretly take the Poseidon, a motorcade taking them and the Penns to Heathrow Airport is rerouted to Windsor Castle after protestors shut down the highway. Kate encourages Penn to take a meeting with Callum, whom Kate has invited to Windsor to propose an explanation for the drop in radiation levels around the sunk Russian submarine. She also expresses a concern that Penn may be too swept up in Hal’s charisma, and mentions that Todd is suspicious of their dynamic. Penn forbids Kate to meet with Callum, but Kate does so anyway; she lies to him, saying the readings he is relying on are faulty. Kate breaks up with Callum and then takes Hal to a chapel to privately renew their vows. As the Americans prepare to leave Windsor, Penn is shot.
24	2	"Redcoats"	Alex Graves	Debora Cahn	October 15, 2026
The Penns are immediately airlifted to the USS Gerald R. Ford while Hal and Kate are rushed into the basement of Windsor Castle for their protection. As she prepares to go into surgery, Penn transfers her powers to Hal for the time she will be anesthetized and orders him to draft remarks to deliver in the event she dies on the operating table. Trowbridge pledges to Kate that the United Kingdom will do everything possible to find the shooter. In speaking with Hal, Billie speculates that Kate, upset over the removal of the Poseidon, might have inadvertently said something about it that led to Penn getting shot; Hal says no, but later asks Kate whether she told Callum about the Poseidon, which she denies. While Hal and Kate argue over the focus of his contingency speech, they also discuss his role as vice president. Hal is notified that Penn has made it out of surgery, but Billie privately tells him she is not sure Penn should take up the reins of power so soon after the operation.
25	3	"The Typo"	Liza Johnson	Jessica Brickman	October 15, 2026
Eidra and Stuart rekindle their relationship and begin planning to live together. Eidra is informed that the shooter has been found dead, having committed suicide. Penn is openly irritable at a briefing on the shooter, generating concerns amongst her staff and Todd. While discussing the plan to bury the submarine in concrete, the British point out to Kate that their estimated cost of the project is twice that of the Americans. She realizes that the British are including costs of radiation containment that the Pentagon comptroller did not, given the secret removal of the Poseidon. Hal is unable to convince Penn to increase the amount to conceal their deception. This stalls the negotiations, so Hal flies to the UK to negotiate with Trowbridge directly. At the meeting, Trowbridge appears unfocused and brusque, prompting an irate Hal to tell him bluntly that the US took the Poseidon. Trowbridge does not acknowledge this, but informs Hal and Kate that Dennison was killed in a helicopter crash in India minutes before the meeting and then walks out to tell Dennison's wife about it.
26	4	"Pagliacci"	Liza Johnson	Peter Noah	October 15, 2026
It is revealed that Trowbridge was distracted by hallucinations at the meeting with the Americans and did not fully process what Hal told him, although MI6 Chief Tom Libby was also present and heard it. At a press conference, Trowbridge lashes out at unspecified countries which bully the United Kingdom; recognizing this as a criticism of the US, Hal tells Kate that, if she feels Trowbridge will reveal what he said about the Poseidon, she should blackmail Trowbridge with the tape of him trying to strangle Margaret Roylin to keep him in line. Trowbridge selects Robyn Palmer, a little-known official from the Department for Transport, as Dennison's successor. Kate meets with Trowbridge and apologizes for Hal’s behavior, but Trowbridge refuses to engage and bars Kate and Hal from Dennison’s funeral; Kate reacts by calling Palmer into the room and informing her that Roylin orchestrated the attack on the HMS Courageous and that, when Trowbridge found out, he tried to strangle Roylin. As Kate watches on television, Trowbridge announces his resignation to the press.
27	5	"Special Envoy"	Tucker Gates	Eli Attie	October 15, 2026
Kate has been feeling unwell as she grapples with her role in toppling Trowbridge’s government. Todd is dispatched to London for a diplomatic tour, and he asks Kate if he can be posted there as a special envoy to get away from the White House. Bethan Vaughn is chosen to be the new Prime Minister. Billie learns that Vaughn received a call from the Kremlin and did not disclose it to the US; she asks Kate to question Vaughn about it. At their first meeting, Vaughn fakes a telephone call to avoid answering Kate's question. After meeting with Palmer, who has been retained as foreign secretary, Kate concludes that the British government is keeping her at arm’s length because she blackmailed Trowbridge. At an event honoring Todd, Vaughn informs Kate that the Kremlin called with a request to retrieve the dead sailors on the submarine and that, despite knowing the Poseidon is no longer there, she acceded to the request. Irritated by Todd's questions about her health, Kate tells him, not realizing Frances can hear her, that she is under stress because her actions brought down Trowbridge's government.
28	6	"The Dead"	Tucker Gates	Julianna Dudley Meagher	October 15, 2026
Penn orders Kate to tell Vaughn to revoke her permission or the United States will send “warships” to block the Russians from reaching their submarine. Kate arranges for Todd to be given the security clearance he needs to participate in the embassy's work. Frances relays to a shocked Stuart what she overheard about Kate blackmailing Trowbridge, and he in turn tells Eidra. Kate informs Eidra and Todd about Penn’s threat to send warships; Todd advises Kate to fully convey the threat to Vaughn. Kate tells Stuart and Eidra about the Poseidon and also reveals that it was Penn who ordered the attack on the HMS Courageous, not Rayburn. They advise her that Penn’s threat is illegal and that, rather than meeting Vaughn with Todd present as planned, she should meet with her alone. Kate suggests to Vaughn that the Russian sailors be extracted by joint US-UK forces to deny Russia a reason for coming for the Poseidon, but Vaughn says no; Kate refrains from passing on the threat. Kate lies to Penn, telling her Vaughn has agreed to revoke her permission.
29	7	"Phony Negroni"	Alex Graves	Anna Hagen	October 15, 2026
Hal, Penn, Billie, and Miguel join Todd and Kate in Italy for the G7 summit, and Billie—under the impression that Vaughn has denied access to the Russians—asks Stuart to figure out why a Russian ship just left Murmansk. Stuart is confused, forcing Kate to tell him and Eidra that she lied to Penn. Kate welcomes Hal and they discuss their relationship. Hal is upset that Kate had been restraining herself and not saying what she feels. As the Penns reunite, Todd suggests something is wrong with Grace, which offends her. Stuart feigns incompetence to stall Billie’s request for information, and when Billie asks what is wrong with him, Stuart reveals he knows Penn planned the attack on the Courageous. Kate admits to Hal she lied to Penn and suggests that the Americans extract the Russian sailors, pressing Hal to deliver the idea to Penn. The Penns and Wylers have dinner together that night, which quickly goes awry after the subject of Penn's erratic behavior comes up again and Penn learns Kate lied to her. Penn again orders Kate to give the threat and take Todd with her as a witness, before dismissing her and Hal abruptly from dinner.
30	8	"Warships"	Alex Graves	Debora Cahn	October 15, 2026
Hal resents Kate using their marriage to gain his support, though she insists her feelings were genuine. When Todd reveals Grace has deployed warships, he ignores their advice and warns Palmer that American forces may attack Russian submarines, potentially destroying NATO. After meeting Vaughn, Kate learns Britain will escort the Russian ships. Penn demands Britain choose between America and Russia. Meanwhile, Stuart prepares a formal dissent against Penn's foreign policy, encouraged by Kate. When Penn retaliates by recalling him to Washington, Kate promises Stuart and Eidra she will intervene. At the G7, Penn announces a Russian submarine leak, concealing the Poseidon, and threatens anyone interfering. Kate publicly resigns, followed by Billie and Ganon. Outside, Kate approaches the press, spots Hal emerging, and announces that the Vice President has a statement.

== Production ==
In January 2022, Netflix announced it had given a series order to The Diplomat from creator Debora Cahn. In February of that year, it was announced Keri Russell would star in the series. In March, it was announced Ali Ahn and Rufus Sewell had joined the cast. In April 2022, David Gyasi, Ato Essandoh, Rory Kinnear, Miguel Sandoval, Nana Mensah, Michael McKean, Celia Imrie and Penny Downie joined the cast. The series was released on April 20, 2023.

Filming took place at a range of locations in the United Kingdom. In London, producers obtained permission to film inside the American embassy in Nine Elms, and the Foreign Office in Westminster, including The Durbar Court and the Foreign Secretary's office. Outside of London, Wrotham Park in Hertfordshire doubled as Winfield House, the residence of the US Ambassador to the United Kingdom, while Ditchley Park, Oxfordshire was used to represent Chevening, the foreign secretary's country residence in Kent. Filming also took place at the Old Royal Naval College, Greenwich, and Cotswold Airport, Gloucestershire. A number of scenes were filmed within London North Studios, located in Mill Hill, north west London, where sets for The Oval Office and US Embassy are located. Filming also took place in Paris, France, at the Palais-Royal and the Louvre, including the latter's Pyramid and Escalier Daru.

On May 1, 2023, Netflix renewed the series for a second season. Filming for season 2 began in June 2023 with locations including St Paul's Cathedral. Other filming locations included the Old Royal Naval College, One Great George Street, Inveraray Castle, Ardkinglas, RAF Halton, Wilton House and Blenheim Palace. In January 2024, it was announced that Allison Janney had been cast as US Vice President Grace Penn for season two. The second season was released on October 31, 2024. On October 10, 2024, ahead of the second season's premiere, Netflix renewed the series for a third season. On January 24, 2025, Bradley Whitford was cast as Todd Penn, the husband of Janney's Grace Penn, for the third season. The third season premiered on October 16, 2025.

On May 14, 2025, ahead of the third season's premiere, Netflix renewed the series for a fourth season. Following the renewal it was reported that Janney, Whitford, and Mensah would be promoted to series regulars for the fourth season. In August 2026, it was announced that the fourth season would premiere on October 15, 2026. On October 29, 2026, the series was renewed for a fifth season.

=== Title conflict ===
The choice of title reportedly caused frustration among the British producers of a Barcelona-set series also titled The Diplomat, which was announced in early 2020 and began airing in the UK two months before the Netflix series. Neither party has indicated a willingness to change the title to avoid confusion.

== Reception ==
=== Critical response ===
Critical response of The Diplomat
Season	Rotten Tomatoes	Metacritic
1	84% (55 reviews)	74 (23 reviews)
2	95% (44 reviews)	76 (23 reviews)
3	97% (31 reviews)	84 (14 reviews)
4	97% (29 reviews)	90 (12 reviews)

==== Season 1 ====
Rotten Tomatoes reported an 84% approval rating with an average of rated reviews of 7.8/10 based on 55 critic reviews. The website's critics consensus reads, "Keri Russell's scrappy performance negotiates the best possible terms for The Diplomat, a soapy take on statecraft that manages to make geopolitical crises highly bingeable entertainment." Metacritic assigned a score of 74 out of 100 based on 23 critics, indicating "generally favorable" reviews.

Julian Borger wrote in The Guardian that there "is a fair amount to be incredulous about", with Netflix having "taken a lot of liberties to keep The Diplomat racing along like a thriller." However, "for all the dramatic licence taken with the plot and characters", the producers "made sure they got at least some of the details absolutely right." He argued that "most current and former diplomats were ready to overlook the impurities" and were appreciative that diplomacy was being "given its moment under the bright lights." Nevertheless, Borger noted that some felt that the series was a "missed opportunity" that "carries on a long tradition of shows that put a foreign policy focus in the title, and then veer completely off into something that has nothing or little to do with actual diplomacy."

The Evening Standard described the first series as "an interesting take on the time-honoured political drama" that "doesn't reach the lofty heights of The West Wing" but "does have a refreshing lack of the moral high ground." The Radio Times was more critical, calling it a "simplistic, bland, and easily digestible political drama" that "isn't particularly thrilling or complex" and "never feels particularly high stakes."

Meanwhile, the Financial Times lamented that the series "spurns the opportunity to provide a considered look at international relations in favour of a generic and improbably-plotted yarn" and "lacks delicacy and nuance." The paper described it as "so exaggerated that it has little to say about actual statecraft and so dry and insistently talky that it struggles to entertain."

==== Season 2 ====
Rotten Tomatoes reported a 95% approval rating with an average of rated reviews of 8.1/10 based on 44 critic reviews. The website's critics consensus reads, "Maintaining explosive momentum with Keri Russell as the arresting eye of the storm, The Diplomat's sophomore season solidifies it as among television's most entertaining dramas." Metacritic assigned a score of 76 out of 100 based on 23 critics, indicating "generally favorable" reviews.

The Guardian was enthusiastic about the second season, calling it "several great shows all at once" and concluding that "The Diplomat should slot effortlessly into any list of the best dramas of the year."

==== Season 3 ====
Rotten Tomatoes reported a 97% approval rating with an average of rated reviews of 8.1/10 based on 31 critic reviews. The website's critics consensus reads, "Elevating both the geopolitical and personal stakes while remembering to have fun, The Diplomat goes from strength to strength throughout its dishy third season." Metacritic assigned a score of 84 out of 100 based on 14 critics, indicating "universal acclaim".

Variety's Alison Herman praised the third season and wrote, "In Season 3, The Diplomat recommits to this core mission, a pivot that pays dividends."

==== Season 4 ====
Rotten Tomatoes reported a 97% approval rating with an average of rated reviews of 8.5/10 based on 29 critic reviews, with an average rating of 8.6/10. The website's critics consensus reads, "Between political crises and marriages that could use their own diplomatic intervention, The Diplomat remains a wickedly entertaining game of power, egos, and shifting allegiances." Metacritic assigned a score of 90 out of 100 based on 12 critics, indicating "universal acclaim".

The Guardian's Sarah Dempster gave the perfect five stars (out of five) for the season and wrote, "Several big things happen involving snipers, security breaches and globular Russians smushing their chins into their chest while mumbling about the fall of the west. The tension! The near-cartoonish absurdity! But, as always, it’s the small stuff that proves most captivating: the perpetual microshifts in power; the twinges of affection in the interminable game of 4D chess that is the Wylers’ marriage."

== Accolades ==
Award	Year	Category	Nominees	Result	Ref.
AACTA Awards	2025	Best Drama Series	The Diplomat	Nominated	
AARP Movies for Grownups Awards	2024	Best Actor (TV/Streaming)	Rufus Sewell	Nominated	
American Film Institute Awards	2025	Top 10 Programs of the Year	The Diplomat	Won	
American Society of Cinematographers Awards	2024	Episode of a Half-Hour Series	Julian Court (for "The James Bond Clause")	Nominated	
Artios Awards	2024	Television Pilot and First Season – Drama	Julie Schubert, Lucinda Syson, and Natasha Vincent	Nominated	
Astra TV Awards	2024	Best Streaming Series, Drama	The Diplomat	Nominated	
Astra TV Awards	2024	Best Actress in a Streaming Series, Drama	Keri Russell	Won	
Astra TV Awards	2024	Best Supporting Actor in a Streaming Series, Drama	Rufus Sewell	Nominated	
Astra TV Awards	2024	Best Directing in a Streaming Series, Drama	Alex Graves (for "The James Bond Clause")	Nominated	
Astra TV Awards	2025	Best Actress in a Drama Series	Keri Russell	Nominated	
Astra TV Awards	2025	Best Supporting Actress in a Drama Series	Allison Janney	Nominated	
Astra TV Awards	2025	Best Writing in a Drama Series	Debora Cahn (for "Dreadnought")	Nominated	
British Academy Television Awards	2026	Best International Programme	Debora Cahn, Janice Williams, Alex Graves, Keri Russell, Melissa Gelernter, and Pam Roberts	Nominated	
Critics' Choice Television Awards	2024	Best Drama Series	The Diplomat	Nominated	
Critics' Choice Television Awards	2024	Best Actress in a Drama Series	Keri Russell	Nominated	
Critics' Choice Television Awards	2024	Best Supporting Actor in a Drama Series	Rufus Sewell	Nominated	
Critics' Choice Television Awards	2025	Best Drama Series	The Diplomat	Nominated	
Critics' Choice Television Awards	2025	Best Actor in a Drama Series	Rufus Sewell	Nominated	
Critics' Choice Television Awards	2025	Best Actress in a Drama Series	Keri Russell	Nominated	
Critics' Choice Television Awards	2025	Best Supporting Actress in a Drama Series	Allison Janney	Nominated	
Critics' Choice Television Awards	2026	Best Drama Series	The Diplomat	Nominated	
Critics' Choice Television Awards	2026	Best Actress in a Drama Series	Keri Russell	Nominated	
Critics' Choice Television Awards	2026	Best Supporting Actress in a Drama Series	Allison Janney	Nominated	
Critics' Choice Television Awards	2026	Best Supporting Actor in a Drama Series	Ato Essandoh	Nominated	
Directors Guild of America Awards	2025	Outstanding Directorial Achievement in Dramatic Series	Alex Graves (for "Dreadnought")	Nominated	
Directors Guild of America Awards	2026	Outstanding Directorial Achievement in Dramatic Series	Liza Johnson (for "Amagansett")	Nominated	
Golden Globe Awards	2024	Best Television Series – Drama	The Diplomat	Nominated	
Golden Globe Awards	2024	Best Actress in a Television Series – Drama	Keri Russell	Nominated	
Golden Globe Awards	2025	Best Television Series – Drama	The Diplomat	Nominated	
Golden Globe Awards	2025	Best Actress in a Television Series – Drama	Keri Russell	Nominated	
Golden Globe Awards	2025	Best Supporting Actress – Series, Miniseries or Television Film	Allison Janney	Nominated	
Golden Globe Awards	2026	Best Television Series – Drama	The Diplomat	Nominated	
Golden Globe Awards	2026	Best Actress in a Television Series – Drama	Keri Russell	Nominated	
Location Managers Guild Awards	2023	Outstanding Locations in Contemporary Television	Ashton Radcliffe, Matt Winter, Alphonse Huynh, and Ollie Bradbury	Nominated	
Online Film & Television Association	2023	Best Actress in a Drama Series	Keri Russell	Nominated	
Primetime Emmy Awards	2024	Outstanding Lead Actress in a Drama Series	Keri Russell	Nominated	
Primetime Emmy Awards	2025	Outstanding Drama Series	Debora Cahn, Janice Williams, Keri Russell, Alex Graves, Peter Noah, Peter Ackerman, Brad Carpenter, Chris Arruda, and Pam Roberts	Nominated	
Primetime Emmy Awards	2025	Outstanding Lead Actress in a Drama Series	Keri Russell	Nominated	
Primetime Emmy Awards	2026	Outstanding Drama Series	Debora Cahn, Janice Williams, Keri Russell, Alex Graves, Peter Noah, Eli Attie, Peter Ackerman, Jessica Brickman, Pam Roberts, Brad Carpenter, and Melissa Gelernter	Nominated	
Primetime Emmy Awards	2026	Outstanding Lead Actress in a Drama Series	Keri Russell	Nominated	
Primetime Emmy Awards	2026	Outstanding Lead Actor in a Drama Series	Rufus Sewell	Nominated	
Primetime Emmy Awards	2026	Outstanding Supporting Actress in a Drama Series	Allison Janney	Won	
Primetime Emmy Awards	2026	Outstanding Writing for a Drama Series	Peter Ackerman and Debora Cahn (for "Amagansett")	Nominated	
Primetime Creative Arts Emmy Awards	2026	Outstanding Casting for a Drama Series	Julie Schubert, Lain Kunin, Ellinor Isherwood, Lucinda Syson and Natasha Vincent	Nominated	
Primetime Creative Arts Emmy Awards	2026	Outstanding Guest Actor in a Drama Series	Bradley Whitford (for "Amagansett")	Nominated	
Producers Guild of America Awards	2024	Best Episodic Drama	The Diplomat	Nominated	
Producers Guild of America Awards	2025	Best Episodic Drama	Debora Cahn, Janice Williams, Keri Russell, Alex Graves, Peter Noah, Peter Ackerman, Pam Roberts, Brad Carpenter, and Chris Arruda	Nominated	
Producers Guild of America Awards	2026	Best Episodic Drama	The Diplomat	Nominated	
Satellite Awards	2025	Best Drama Series	The Diplomat	Nominated	
Satellite Awards	2025	Best Actress in a Drama Series	Keri Russell	Nominated	
Satellite Awards	2026	Best Drama Series	The Diplomat	Nominated	
Satellite Awards	2026	Best Actress in a Drama Series	Keri Russell	Nominated	
Screen Actors Guild Awards	2024	Outstanding Performance by a Female Actor in a Drama Series	Keri Russell	Nominated	
Screen Actors Guild Awards	2025	Outstanding Performance by an Ensemble in a Drama Series	Ali Ahn, Sandy Amon-Schwartz, Tim Delap, Penny Downie, Ato Essandoh, David Gyasi, Celia Imrie, Rory Kinnear, Pearl Mackie, Nana Mensah, Graham Miller, Keri Russell, Rufus Sewell, Adam Silver, and Kenichiro Thomson	Nominated	
Screen Actors Guild Awards	2025	Outstanding Performance by a Female Actor in a Drama Series	Allison Janney	Nominated	
Screen Actors Guild Awards	2025	Outstanding Performance by a Female Actor in a Drama Series	Keri Russell	Nominated	
Screen Actors Guild Awards	2026	Outstanding Performance by an Ensemble in a Drama Series	Ali Ahn, Penny Downie, Rosaline Elbay, Ato Essandoh, David Gyasi, Rory Kinnea, Nana Mensah, Graham Miller, Keri Russell, and Rufus Sewell	Nominated	
Screen Actors Guild Awards	2026	Outstanding Performance by a Female Actor in a Drama Series	Keri Russell	Won	
Writers Guild of America Awards	2024	Drama Series	Eli Attie, Debora Cahn, Mia Chung, Anna Hagen, Amanda Johnson-Zetterstrom, and Peter Noah	Nominated	
Writers Guild of America Awards	2024	New Series	Eli Attie, Debora Cahn, Mia Chung, Anna Hagen, Amanda Johnson-Zetterstrom, and Peter Noah	Nominated	
Writers Guild of America Awards	2025	Drama Series	Peter Ackerman, Eli Attie, Debora Cahn, Anna Hagen, Julianna Dudley Meagher, and Peter Noah	Nominated	

== Viewership ==
Season 1 featured in the global Netflix top 10s for four weeks, picking up 173.46 million hours watched. The season featured in the Nielsen top 10 charts for two weeks in the US picking up 44.90 million hours watched.
