= Chorus (video game) =

- Developer: Fishlabs (Note: Co-developed with Dambuster Studios)
- Publisher: Deep Silver
- Artist: Kareem Leggett
- Composer: Pedro Macedo Camacho
- Engine: Unreal Engine 4
- Platforms: PlayStation 4; PlayStation 5; Stadia; Windows; Xbox One; Xbox Series X/S
- Release: 3 December 2021
- Genre: Space combat
- Mode: Single-player

Chorus is a 2021 space combat game developed by Fishlabs and published by Deep Silver. It was released for PlayStation 4, PlayStation 5, Stadia, Windows, Xbox One, and Xbox Series X/S on 3 December 2021.

Chorus received generally positive reviews from critics and failed to meet the sales expectations of Embracer Group.

== Gameplay ==
Chorus is a space combat video game played from a third-person perspective. The game's protagonist, Nara, pilots a sentient starcraft known as Forsaken. Forsaken can be armed with a variety of weapons such as missile launchers, gatling guns and laser cannons. Forsaken also has three slots for mods, which can be used to alter the ship's performance in combat. The game is set in an open world, and the players can complete various optional quests. As Nara explores the world, she will encounter various ancient temples. Upon exploring these temples and solving puzzles, Nara will gain aether powers that grant her new combat abilities. For instance, the "Rite of the Hunt" ability allows Forsaken to warp directly behind enemies.

== Synopsis ==
Nara (portrayed by Jess Chanliau, voiced by Cassie Bradley), a top pilot with a checkered past, and her sentient starfighter Forsaken must work together to defeat the Circle, an oppressive cult led by the Great Prophet who seeks to dominate the whole galaxy.

== Development ==
Chorus was developed by Fishlabs, which is most known for developing the Galaxy on Fire series for mobile devices. Development of the game commenced in 2017. The game was announced on 7 May 2020 during Microsoft's Xbox 20/20 event.

== Reception ==
Reception

Aggregate score
| Aggregator | Score |
|---|---|
| Metacritic | (PC) 76/100 (PS5) 73/100 (XSXS) 78/100 |

Review scores
| Publication | Score |
|---|---|
| GamesRadar+ | 3.5/5 |
| Hardcore Gamer | 4/5 |
| IGN | 8/10 |
| Push Square | 7/10 |
| Shacknews | 7/10 |

Chorus received "generally favorable" reviews from critics, while the PS5 version received "mixed or average" reviews, according to review aggregator website Metacritic. The game won Best German Game at Deutscher Computerspielpreis in 2022.

Jon Bailes of GamesRadar+ wrote that the game "conjured the feel of a good Star Wars scene", praising its ship designs, space battles, controls, and special powers while criticizing the bland story and bad bosses. Dan Stapleton of IGN praised the game's scenery and dogfights while calling the story "respectable even though it threatens to drown you in lore." Ollie Reynolds of Push Square praised the slick combat, DualSense feedback, side missions and accessibility options while criticizing the poor dialogue, low framerate, and in-game map.

In February 2022, Embracer Group (parent company of Deep Silver) revealed that Chorus had failed to meet sales expectations.

== Accolades ==
| Date | Award | Category | Nominee(s) | Result | Ref. |
|---|---|---|---|---|---|
| 16 November 2022 | Hollywood Music in Media Awards | Best Original Score – Video Game | Pedro Macedo Camacho | Won | |
| 16 November 2022 | Hollywood Music in Media Awards | Best Original Song – Video Game | Pedro Macedo Camacho, Vocals performed by Úyanga Bold | Nominated | |
