= Audiosurf 2 =

2015 video game

- Developer: Dylan Fitterer
- Publisher: Dylan Fitterer
- Platforms: Microsoft Windows, OS X, Linux
- Release: WW: May 26, 2015
- Genres: Puzzle, Music
- Modes: Single-player, multiplayer

Audiosurf 2, previously named Audiosurf Air, is a music-based puzzle video game created by Dylan Fitterer, and the sequel to Audiosurf. It was launched on October 2, 2013, for Windows through Steam Early Access, OS X and Linux versions were released on January 9, 2015. The game is Steam Workshop compatible, allowing players to create and share mods for the game. It came out of early access on May 26, 2015.

== Gameplay ==
The game uses the player's own music library to generate a course the player needs to navigate through. The sequel adds a wakeboarding mode that lets players distort the songs and features two boats that tug players along and provide opportunities to jump and pull off tricks.

== Development ==
A sequel to Audiosurf, Audiosurf Air, was announced via Dylan Fitterer's Twitter account and the Audiosurf launch screen in March 2012. An early access version was released via Steam on October 2, 2013. Audiosurf 2 left Early Access in May 2015.

== Reception ==
Reception

Aggregate score
Aggregator	Score
Metacritic	76/100

IGN awarded the game a score of 7.5 out of 10, saying "Audiosurf 2's excellent Mono mode carries this hypnotic rhythm game through music management issues and lesser modes".
