= Fairytale Fights =

2009 video game

- European PlayStation 3 cover
- Developer: Playlogic Game Factory (Note: Additional development by Abstraction Games, Geniusprogrammer.net and Hydravision Entertainment)
- Publisher: Playlogic Entertainment
- Director: Olivier Lhermite
- Producer: Elke Herinckx
- Designers: Tj'ièn Twijnstra; Rogério Silva
- Programmers: Erik Bastianen; Marcel Meulemans
- Artists: André van Rooijen; Robin Keijzer; Gerrit Willemse; Jeroen Backx; Peter van Dranen; André van Rooijen
- Writers: Robin Keijzer; Paul van der Meer
- Composers: Pedro Macedo Camacho; Jonathan van den Wijngaarden
- Engine: Unreal Engine 3
- Platforms: PlayStation 3, Xbox 360
- Release: EU: October 23, 2009; NA: October 27, 2009
- Genres: Hack-and-slash, action-adventure
- Modes: Single-player, multiplayer

Fairytale Fights is a 2009 hack and slash action-adventure game developed by Playlogic Game Factory and published by Playlogic Entertainment for PlayStation 3 and Xbox 360. The game allows the player a chance to reclaim the fairytale status of Little Red Riding Hood, Snow White, Jack, The Naked Emperor and more.

== Gameplay ==
Fairytale Fights was developed with the Unreal Engine 3. The game has a volumetric liquid system, where blood drenches the surroundings when the player slice up the enemies multiple times in a frenzied attack. They are also able to slide through the pools of blood and melt their enemies using acid potions. Players have full control over how and when to slice their enemies, called dynamic slicing technology. The game features a multiplayer system for online and offline play, with drop-in-drop-out gameplay. Fairytale Fights features 140 weapons, and 3 difficulty levels.

== Reception ==
Fairytale Fights received mixed reviews, with a 51% average score for the Xbox 360 version on Metacritic. Some critics were more positive about it, such as Games Master magazine in the UK, which called it "a likeable, if slight, slice of gory Brothers Grimm gaming". However, many sources were considerably more scathing. IT Reviews said that "the dodgy controls combined with some awkward camera viewpoints, plus the overly repetitive levels, slowly sap much of the joy from the experience". GameSpot went further, criticising the game's lack of pacing, lousy boss fights and "shallow, repetitive combat". Andy Eddy of Team Xbox added that Fairytale Fights's "annoyingly bad game design" held it back from being a better game. He went on to say "Sadly, [Fairytale Fights'] gimmicks aren't strong enough to maintain the game across its entirety."

A considerable number of glitches marred the Xbox 360 release in particular, leading to less than positive reviews before the much delayed patch was eventually released. Until the game was patched, several achievements were unobtainable and multiplayer was severely affected, something which has since been remedied.

=== Awards ===
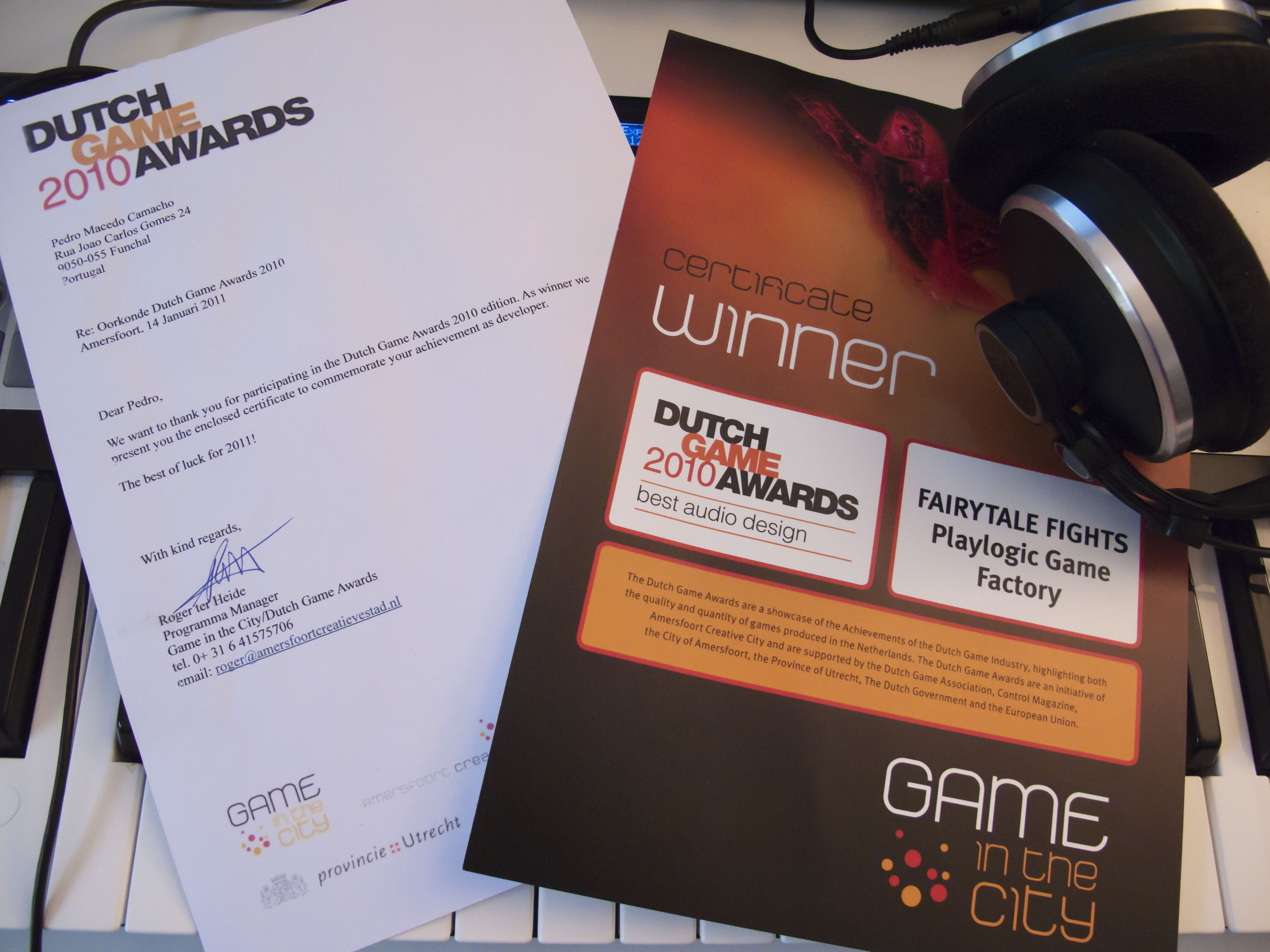
Dutch Games Awards 2010 Best Audio Design Award won by Pedro Macedo Camacho for his work on Fairytale Fights with Jonathan van den Wijngaarden

Despite the mixed reviews across the web, Fairytale Fights won two Dutch Game Awards out of its three nominations during the 2010 Control Industry Award ceremony. It was nominated for Best Audio Design, Best Visual Design and Best Console game of 2009–2010, taking home both the awards for Best Audio Design and Best Visual Design.
