= Angel Mako =

Greek video game developer (born c. 2007)

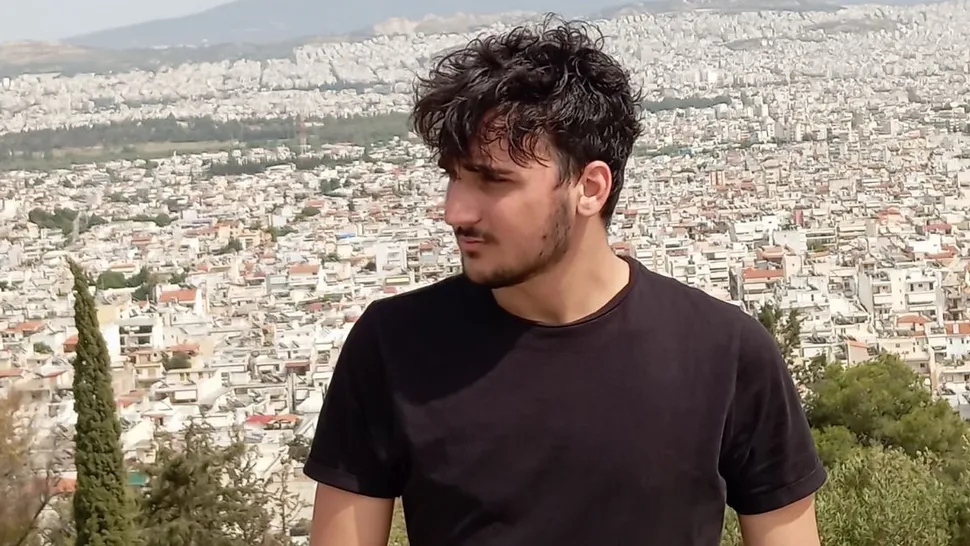
- Born: Angelos Mako c. 2007
- Occupation: Video game developer
- Years active: 2024–present
- Known for: Reviving Dungeon Rampage

Angel Mako (born c. 2007), also known as Angelos Mako, is a Greek video game developer known for acquiring rights to and reviving the Facebook game Dungeon Rampage returning it to service eight years after shutdown.

== Career ==
=== Fan project ===
In 2021 Mako joined a community project focused on reviving Dungeon Rampage. The group aimed to build a new game rather than restore the original, and made limited progress; Mako took over the project in 2024 and redirected it toward restoration. Contributors raised the risk of a copyright claim from the rights holders, prompting him to seek a licence before development continued.

Using a saved copy of the game's credits screen, Mako created a LinkedIn account and contacted the original staff. Jason Yeung, the game's creative director, referred him to Mike Goslin, who had run Rebel Entertainment; Mike Goslin in turn helped the project acquire the licence.

=== Gamebreaking Studios ===
Mako contacted Scott Rogers, author of Level Up! The Guide to Great Video Game Design, who shortly afterwards posted that Gamebreaking Studios was seeking co-development clients. Talks with the studio about rebuilding the game in Unity initially stalled over cost. Gamebreaking Studios is an employee-owned, remote-first developer based in Irvine, California, with 26 staff and no outside investment.

No copy of the game's code could be found: the original lead artist supplied art source files, but the codebase appeared lost. Mako traced the last engineer to have worked on the game, who still had the final build on a laptop he had given to his young daughter who had the files intact.

The recovery persuaded Gamebreaking Studios to take on the project. About three months into the collaboration the build ran during a video call, making Mako the first person to play the game in eight years.

=== Release ===
A Kickstarter campaign launched in May 2025 met its US$25,000 goal within 24 hours and closed at $70,463. The team regained access to the original game's Facebook page, and the game reached more than 100,000 Steam wishlists by June 2025. Its demo was played by over 80,000 people.

== Games ==
Year	Title	Role(s)
2025	Dungeon Rampage (Early Access revival)	Project Lead
