= Audiosurf =

2008 video game

- Developer: Dylan Fitterer
- Publishers: Audiosurf, LLC
- Composer: Pedro Macedo Camacho
- Engine: Quest3D
- Platforms: Windows, Zune HD
- Release: February 15, 2008
- Genres: Puzzle, music
- Modes: Single-player, multiplayer

Audiosurf is a 2008 music-based puzzle video game created by Invisible Handlebar, a company founded by Dylan Fitterer. Its track-style stages visually mimic the music the player chooses, while the player races across several lanes collecting colored blocks that appear in sync with the music. The game was released on February 15, 2008, over Steam, a few days after winning the Independent Games Festival 2008 Excellence in Audio Award, heavily influenced by the soundtrack composed by Pedro Macedo Camacho. The full version was for a long time only available for purchase through Steam, but was later released as a retail product in Europe, by Ascaron. Audiosurf was the first third-party game to use Valve's Steamworks technology. The Zune HD version was also released as Audiosurf: Tilt. A sequel, Audiosurf 2, was released in May 2015.

== Gameplay ==
Audiosurf playing "Through the Fire and Flames", using the Ninja Mono character

In Audiosurf, the player controls a levitating vehicle and maneuvers it through a multi-lane highway, collecting blocks.

Such vehicles include: Mono, Double Vision, Eraser, Pointman, Pusher, and Vegas. Variants for some vehicles include: Ninja, Pro and Elite.

The music used in the game is chosen from the user's own library, from almost any DRM-free format, as well as standard redbook CDs. In addition, Audiosurf includes the soundtrack to The Orange Box as part of the download. An "Audiosurf Radio" tab is included on the "Song Select" screen that allows the user to play the Audiosurf Overture, as well as a shifting selection of songs by featured independent artists.

The goal of the game is to score points by collecting colored blocks (called 'cars') and forming clusters of 3 or more of the same color. The more blocks one accumulates in a cluster, the more points are scored. In the default color setting of the game, blocks that appear in hot colors such as red and yellow are worth more points, while cool colors such as blue and magenta are worth less. Players are also awarded bonus points at the end of each track based on the feats they achieved. These include finishing the song with no blocks left in the grid or collecting all the blocks of a certain color. Each track for each difficulty level has three medals: bronze, silver, and gold. These are awarded upon reaching the point total required for them. There are also additional game modes in the game where the goal changes. There are three different high score lists for each song, for casual, pro, and elite characters respectively.

Audiosurf synchronizes the environment, traffic patterns, and scenery with the events in the current song. Each music file imported to the game by the user is first analyzed by the game engine, and an ASH file (containing the dynamics of the sounds and how the track and blocks are arranged) associated with the music is created and saved. The game loads the environment from the ASH files, with the track's elevation, surface, and layout reflected in the dynamics of the music being played.

The player can choose between 14 different characters to play in the game. The characters are divided between three difficulty levels and each has its own unique ability. An "Ironmode" option is also available during character selection, which makes the game more difficult.

== Development ==
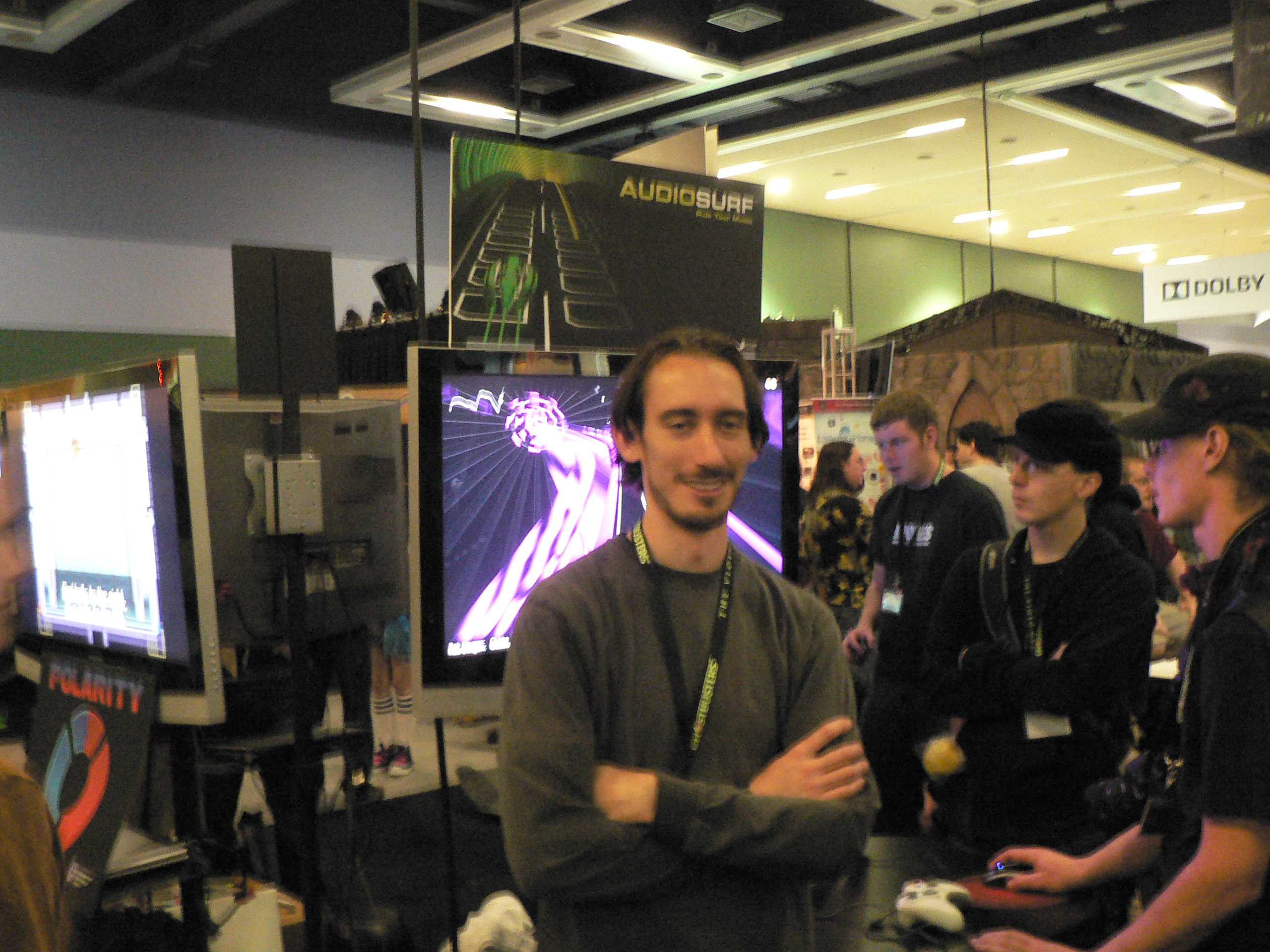
Dylan Fitterer, the creator of Audiosurf, in front of the game's booth at PAX 2008

The game was the brainchild of Dylan Fitterer who worked for a majority of the project alone, only bringing in outside help near the end. Fitterer wanted to create a game that would fuse gameplay with a music visualizer. Fitterer has cited the game Rez as his biggest influence. Fitterer also cited a music visualizer from WildTangent, which got him thinking about music in a 3D space.

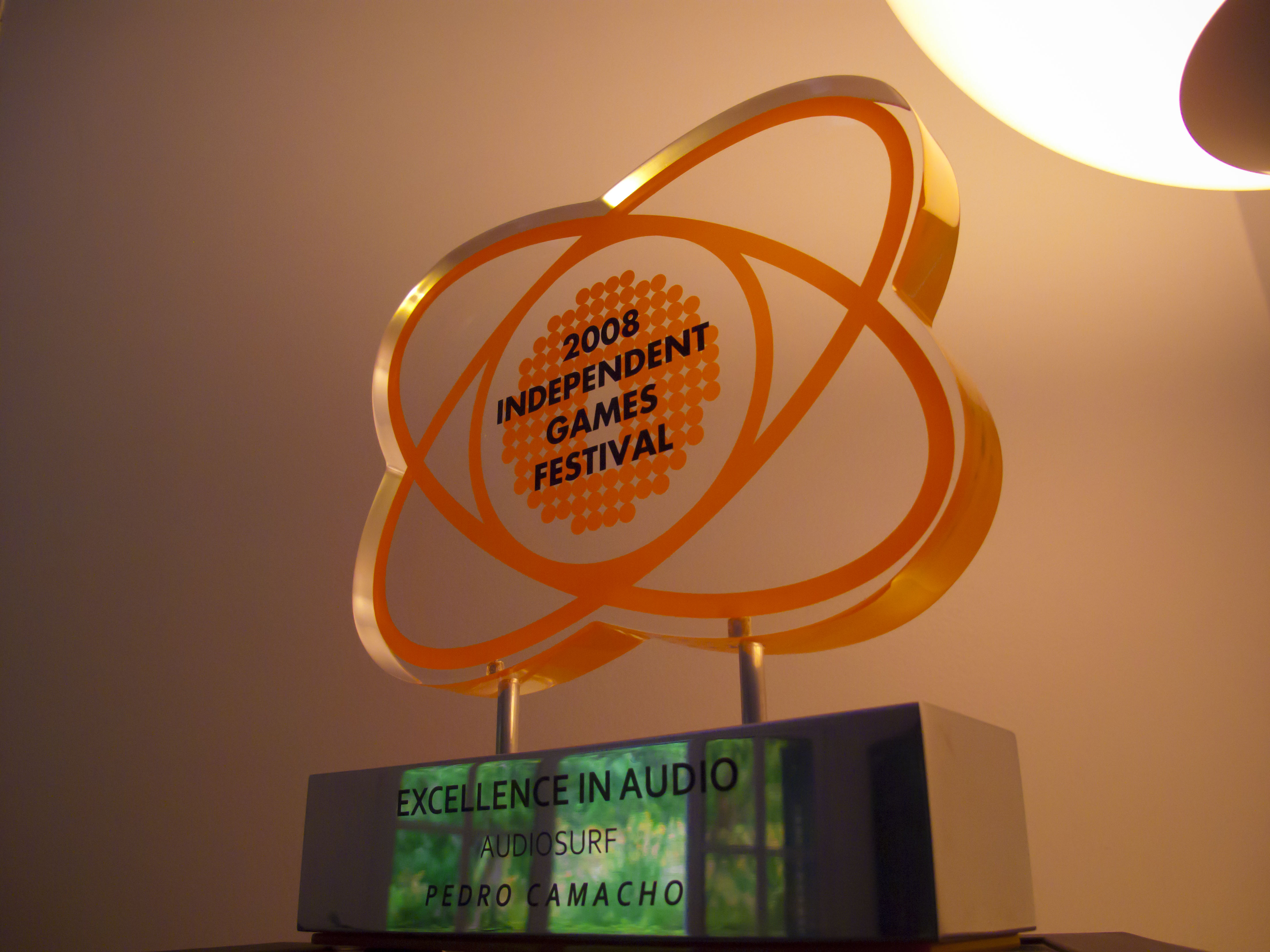
IGF 2008 Excellence in Audio Award won by Pedro Macedo Camacho for his work on Audiosurf

Pedro Camacho created the soundtrack and was the sound effects supervisor on Audiosurf. "Audiosurf Overture" was a track previously done by Camacho as the main demo track for a virtual synthesizer called Predator from Rob Papen. The IGF awarded composer stated on his website that "this award would have never been possible to achieve if not coupled with such an amazing game by Dylan Fitterer".

== Release ==
=== Audiosurf: Tilt ===
A portable version of the game called Audiosurf: Tilt was released on November 11, 2009, for the Zune HD. It was available to download for free from the Zune Marketplace. The gameplay is largely simplified, though it retains the same basic principles. There are no characters to choose from in this version, nor is there an Ironmode. The game follows one basic formula, in which the player tries to collect all the blocks while dodging roadblocks (it can be played at "normal" and "turbo" speeds). In addition, there is a "Watch Lightshow" mode, in which the player does not collect blocks at all. Simply put, it is similar to a full-screen display that matches up to music in many popular music player applications (Windows Media Player, Xbox 360, etc.).

== Reception ==
Reception

Aggregate score
Aggregator	Score
Metacritic	85/100

Review scores
Publication	Score
1Up.com	A
Eurogamer	7/10
IGN	8.6/10

Audiosurf was positively received with the broad majority of critics. On Metacritic, the title holds an average of 85 out of 100, suggesting favorable reviews. 1Up.com awarded Audiosurf an "A" rating citing the massive replay value. IGN gave the title an 8.6 out of 10, and stated that "[Audiosurf is] one of those games that offers something for everyone". Eurogamer were slightly less impressed, giving the game a 7 out of 10, criticizing its rough edges, yet remained convinced that the title had enough potential to become "a bite-sized obsession".

== Sequels ==
A sequel, Audiosurf 2, was released in May 2015.

Fitterer announced a new game, Audiomech: Your Future Transformed, in 2025.

== See also ==
- Amplitude
