= Jess Chanliau =

American-French actor

Jess Chanliau is an American-French actor. Chanliau played the role of Ronnie in the 2023 Netflix series The Diplomat.

== Career ==
Born in the United States to an Irish mother and a French father, Jess Chanliau grew up bilingual alongside a twin brother. After moving to Paris, they attended the French Collège and Lycée, accompanied by lessons at the private acting school Cours Florent. For their final year of school, Chanliau returned to high school in the United States, took acting classes at the Marin School of the Arts (affiliated with Novato High School), and graduated in 2011.

After graduating from high school, Chanliau continued their education at the Pacific Conservatory of the Performing Arts in Santa Maria, California, until 2013. According to Chanliau, the cross-gender role of Viola in Shakespeare's Twelfth Night was particularly relevant here, as was the portrayal of a "queer Mercutio" in Romeo and Juliet, since Chanlieu identifies as trans, non-binary, and androgynous, but is otherwise mostly read as female and cast in corresponding roles.

Following their time in Santa Maria, Jess Chanliau attended the Royal Conservatoire of Scotland in Glasgow, interrupted by a semester at the Conservatoire National Supérieur d'Art Dramatique in Paris, graduating in 2017 with a Bachelor of Arts degree.

In 2018, Chanliau played twenty different characters alongside Martin McCormick in his autobiographical two-person play South Bend. After premiering at the Edinburgh Festival Fringe, the two toured Scotland with the play.

After several minor roles, including an episode appearance in the 2020 television adaptation of Aldous Huxley's Brave New World, they landed their first leading role in the British horror film Patients of a Saint. The film was screened at the Berlin International Film Festival in 2019.

Chanliau gained further recognition in 2023 for their role as Ronnie, the right-hand of envoy Stuart Heyford in the Netflix series The Diplomat.

== Filmography ==
- 2014: The Riven
- 2020: Brave New World (television series, one episode)
- 2020: Patients of a Saint (Inmate Zero)
- 2023: The Diplomat (television series)

== Other roles ==
- 2021: Chorus (video game) as Nara

== Personal life ==
Chanliau uses the gender-neutral pronoun they.
