= Perils of Man =

2014 video game

- Developer: IF Games
- Publisher: IF Games
- Director: Mike Huber
- Producer: Nathan Ornick
- Designers: Gene Mocsy; Bill Tiller
- Writer: Stephen Beckner
- Composer: Paul Shapera
- Engine: Unity
- Platforms: iOS; Windows
- Release: 28 April 2015
- Genre: Adventure
- Mode: Single-player

Perils of Man is a 2014 computer adventure game designed by Gene Mocsy and Bill Tiller and developed and published by IF Games. It follows protagonist Ana Eberling as she attempts to solve the mystery of her father's disappearance. As the plot unfolds, Ana discovers a dark family history and a powerful technology that has been hidden from the public for generations.

Perils of Man was acclaimed by critics for its graphic design. Touch Arcade stated it was “A powerful set up for a storyline, it highlights on the emotions of grief, loss and fear, and does so incredibly well. It's definitely worth experiencing one of the finest looking games to grace the iPad in some time.” The game contains elements of steampunk fiction and the art style has been likened to that of Tim Burton.

Chapter 1 of the game was released for free on Apple's App Store in April 2014. The full game was released in 2015 and it is available for Mac and PC on the Apple's App Store and Steam.

== Gameplay ==
Perils of Man is a third-person, touch-driven, stylized adventure game in which the player must solve various puzzles and follow certain procedures in order for the story to proceed. As a pure point-and-click adventure game, Perils of Man follows the guidelines first introduced by LucasArts. It is impossible to die or to get stuck at any point in the game, which allows the user to fully enjoy Perils of Man's universe without the fear of making a mistake or the constant need to save the game.

== Plot ==
In the game, the player controls the actions of Swiss teenager Ana Eberling, who receives a gift from her father on her 16th birthday. Since her father had disappeared over 10 years ago, she takes this as a sign that he must still be alive despite the fact that her mother Nadia claims to have seen his ghost. Ana vows to get to the bottom of the mystery and starts by exploring the old family mansion in Zurich where she soon discovers a secret laboratory hidden in the basement. Here she befriends a mechanical bird, Darwin, who joins her adventure. After she discovers a strange set of goggles that let her see through time, she is catapulted on an adventure to sites in history that are doomed to catastrophe.

== Development ==
The game was produced in Zurich, Switzerland, and involved a distributed production team of more than 60 people. The game was developed in Unity for mobile devices. The project was sponsored by Swiss reinsurer Swiss Re as part of their 150-year anniversary.

== Reception ==
Reception

Aggregate score
Aggregator	Score
Metacritic	61/100 (PC)

Review scores
Publication	Score
Game Informer	4/5
TouchArcade	4.5/5
148Apps	4/5

Perils of Man Chapter 1 won the SGDA Award 2014 for Best Swiss Video Game of the year and an EDI shortlist award in 2013. Based on 18 reviews, Metacritic gave the PC version an aggregate score of 61% ("mixed or average reviews").

Gamers Sphere said “Perils of Man sets new standards for the point-and-click genre. I never felt like I solved a puzzle or completed a task for no reason, like I do in some adventure games. Each challenge felt naturally placed and seemed to affect the game just as it should.” Expert Reviews called it “Hauntingly atmospheric. Adeptly touching on sensitive psychological territory”, while Just Adventure said “The quality of production is clearly evident from the opening moments. Exploring the richly detailed doll-house environments, and being drawn into the somewhat nutty family history of the Eberlings and their secret invention will certainly leave you wanting more.”
