= Dungeon Rampage =

- Developers: Rebel Entertainment; Gamebreaking Studios (2025 revival)
- Publishers: Rebel Entertainment; Gamebreaking Studios (2025 revival)
- Engine: Adobe Flash (Adobe AIR for revival)
- Platforms: Adobe Flash; Windows
- Release: Open beta December 2011; Facebook; September 5, 2012; Windows (Steam); December 5, 2025 (early access); November 3, 2026 (1.0)
- Genres: Hack and slash, dungeon crawl, action role-playing
- Modes: Single-player, online cooperative multiplayer

Dungeon Rampage is a cooperative multiplayer hack and slash dungeon crawler originally developed and published by Rebel Entertainment, a Burbank, California–based division of IAC. Built in Adobe Flash, it entered open beta on Facebook in December 2011 and officially launched in September 2012, with versions also playable on Kongregate and the game's own website. Players control one of several cartoon heroes and fight through isometric dungeons in groups of up to three, in real time.

The game drew comparisons to Diablo, Gauntlet and Castle Crashers, and reached roughly 700,000 to 800,000 monthly active users around its launch. After the original servers went offline in 2017, fan Angel Mako obtained the rights to the game and revived it alongside Gamebreaking Studios. Following a Kickstarter campaign that raised $70,463, the revival entered early access on Steam on December 5, 2025.

== Gameplay ==
Dungeon Rampage is a real-time beat 'em up–style dungeon crawler viewed from a top-down isometric perspective. Its developers described the play as closer to an arcade title than to typical Facebook games of the period. Dungeons blend premade and procedurally generated layouts, so each run differs.

Players choose a hero from a roster that numbered six at the open beta, including the Berserker, Ranger, Sorcerer, Battle, Vampire Hunter and Chef Ghost Samurai. New players start as the Berserker and buy other heroes with in-game coins. Each hero has a variety of weapons to pick from and a special attack, the Dungeon Buster, which becomes available as the buster meter fills.

Defeated enemies and broken objects sometimes drop coins, xp, food and mana. Treasure chests hold weapons in four rarity tiers. Heroes can also equip pets, such as rhinos, wolves and dragons, that fight alongside them. The nominal plot follows a group of heroes battling the evil Lord Dinglepus and his monsters.

The original game used two currencies: coins, earned in play, and gems, bought with real money. The 2025 revival is a one-time purchase with no microtransactions, in which all heroes, maps and former premium items are earned through play, and it supports groups of up to four players.

== Development ==
=== Original game ===
Rebel Entertainment was founded in 2011 in Burbank, California, as a division of IAC. Rebel was led by general manager Mike Goslin and staffed by developers formerly at Atari, Zynga, Electronic Arts and Disney; Jason Yeung served as creative director.

The team drew on action role-playing and MMO mechanics and aimed at more serious players than typical farming-style social games. Goslin compared it to Blizzard's Diablo III, though far less serious in tone. The game's code combined a Flash client, and a C++ and PHP backend.

=== Revival ===
The revival was led by Angel Mako, a Greek fan who began playing Dungeon Rampage at about age seven and was ten when its servers closed in 2017. In 2024 he took over a fan remake project organized on Discord. To protect the project from copyright claims, he sought the rights directly, contacting former Rebel staff on LinkedIn using names from the game's credits. Jason Yeung referred him to Mike Goslin, who helped Mako secure the game's license at age 17.

Through designer Scott Rogers, Mako connected with Gamebreaking Studios, a co-development studio in Irvine, California. The two first discussed rebuilding the game from scratch in Unity, but could not due to budget constraints. The original lead artist had supplied art source files, but the source code was still missing until the project's last engineer found the final build on an old laptop he had given to his young daughter. With the code recovered, Gamebreaking agreed to restore the original game rather than remake it. The work required repairing interdependent Flash, C++ and PHP systems, and after about three months the game ran again during a video call with Mako.

The restored version still uses Flash, now packaged with Adobe AIR. Gamebreaking removed microtransactions, added support for modern resolutions, and introduced anti-cheat measures to address the cheating that had affected the original.

== Release ==
Dungeon Rampage entered open beta on Facebook in December 2011. Over the following months it gained more than 2 million registered users and about 700,000 monthly active users, and players completed more than 47 million dungeon runs during the beta. Rebel publicly emerged from stealth in mid-2012 with the game already running.

The official launch followed on September 5, 2012, simultaneously on Facebook, Kongregate and the game's own website. To mark it, Rebel gave its roughly 800,000 monthly players a Chieftain skin for the Berserker and introduced the Pyromancer as the first post-launch hero. The servers were shut down in 2017.

Gamebreaking launched a Kickstarter campaign for the revival on May 19, 2025. It met its $25,000 goal within 24 hours and closed in June 2025 with $70,463 from 1,603 backers. A free Steam demo drew more than 80,000 players. The revival entered Steam early access on December 5, 2025, priced at $9.99 with regional pricing, launching with four heroes. Planned early access updates include controller support, Steam achievements, four more heroes from the original game, and the return of Ultimate Rampage, a roguelite challenge mode. The full 1.0 release, which ends early access, is scheduled for November 3, 2026.
