= Pedro Camacho =

Portuguese composer

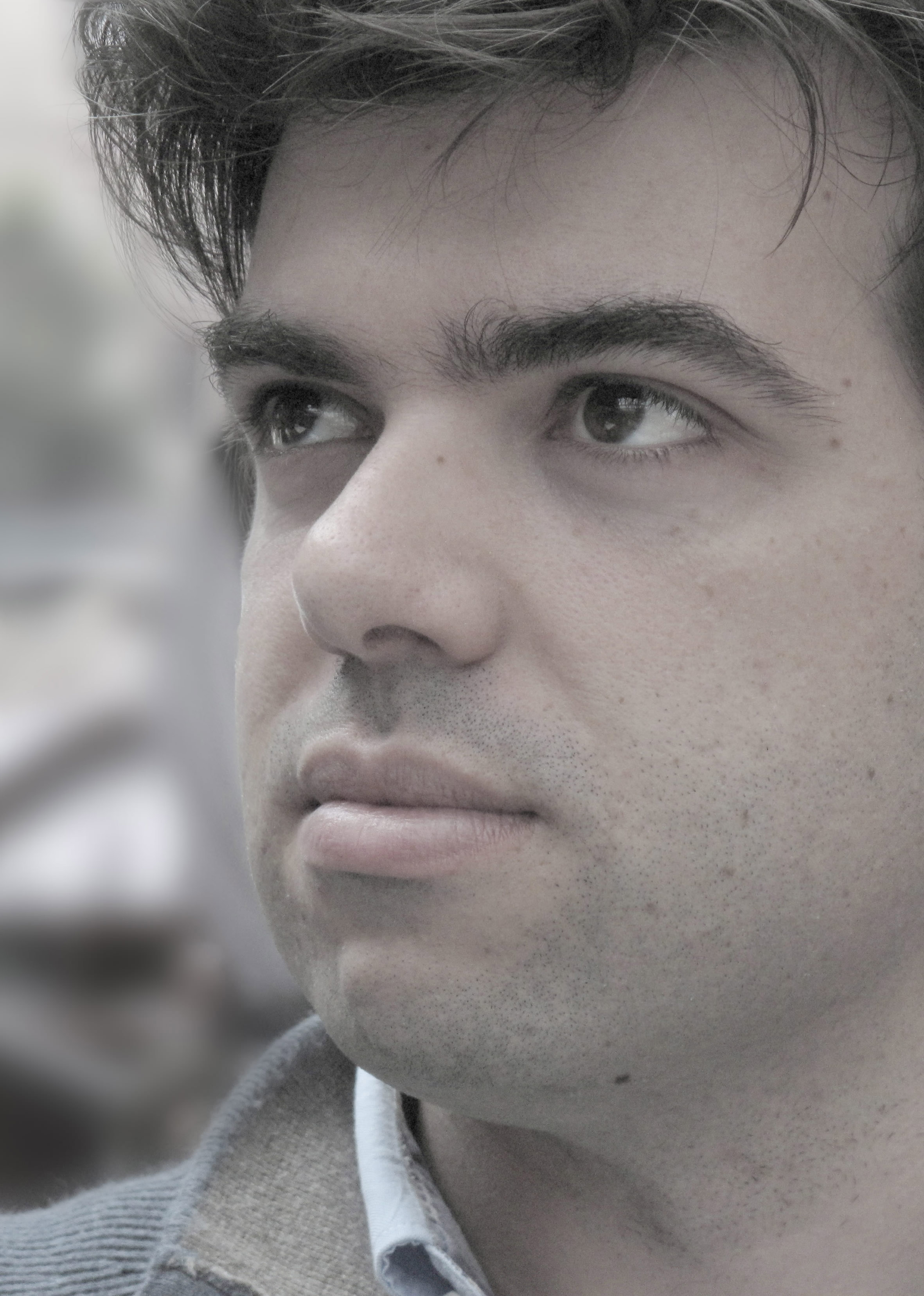
- Camacho in 2014

Background information
- Birth name: Pedro Macedo Camacho
- Origin: Funchal, Portugal
- Occupation: Composer
- Instrument: Piano
- Years active: 1995–present
- Website: musicbypedro.com

Pedro Macedo Camacho is a Portuguese composer of classical music as well as film and video game scores. He is best known for his scores to Star Citizen and World of Warcraft: Shadowlands.

== Biography ==
Camacho was born in Funchal, a city in Madeira, and started learning composition with Argentinean composer Roberto Pérez in his home city's Conservatoire and Arts School.

After three years, Camacho moved to Lisbon, where he continued his studies in the National Conservatoire for another four years with composer and teacher Eurico Carrapatoso. As a pianist, Camacho started with teacher and musicologist, Robert Andres, and then with the Portuguese teacher, Melina Rebelo.

Pedro continued to learn with Carrapatoso until 2006 and, after his long classical training on composition and orchestration, Pedro was taught film scoring in Berklee College of Music.

Camacho claims that composing has been an important part of his life since he was ten years old, when he started composing short musical pieces using the vintage tracker program OctaMED on an Amiga 500.

Camacho's career in concert music began in 2011, when he was commissioned to write the Requiem to Inês de Castro by Orquestra Clássica do Centro which premiered in March 2012. In this concert Camacho's composition teacher, Eurico Carrapatoso, also adapted one of his works to serve as opening to the Requiem.

== Works ==
=== Video games ===
Year	Title	Developer
2007	Fury	Auran, Codemasters
2007	Crime City	Games2Gaze
2007	Audiosurf	Invisible Handlebar
2007	Color Trail	Real Time Solutions
2007	Darwin the Monkey	Rocksolid Games
2007	Days of Sail	immersionFX
2007	Bonnie and Clyde	Mediaramas
2008	A Vampyre Story	Autumn Moon Entertainment
2008	Sacred 2: Fallen Angel	Ascaron
2008	Zeno Clash	Ace Team
2009	Fairytale Fights	Playlogic Game Factory
2009	Ghost Pirates of Vooju Island	Autumn Moon Entertainment
2010	GooseGogs	Crimson Cow
2011	Afterfall: InSanity	Nicolas Entertainment Group
2018	Wolfenstein II: The New Colossus	MachineGames
2020	World of Warcraft: Shadowlands	Blizzard Entertainment
2021	Chorus	Fishlabs
2024	Call of Duty: Black Ops 6	Treyarch
TBA	Star Citizen	Cloud Imperium Games

=== Other projects ===
Year	Title	Notes
2006	Stilt Walkers	Film
2010	Dom Duardos	Theater
2010	3DMark11	Software
2012	Requiem to Inês de Castro, Op. 1	Concert music
2013	Caixa Geral de Depósitos "Turn Around"	Commercial
2013	Sonae's Maxmat	Commercial
2019	Te Deum	Concert Music
2020	Gatorade China	Commercial
2021	From the Dark	Concert Music

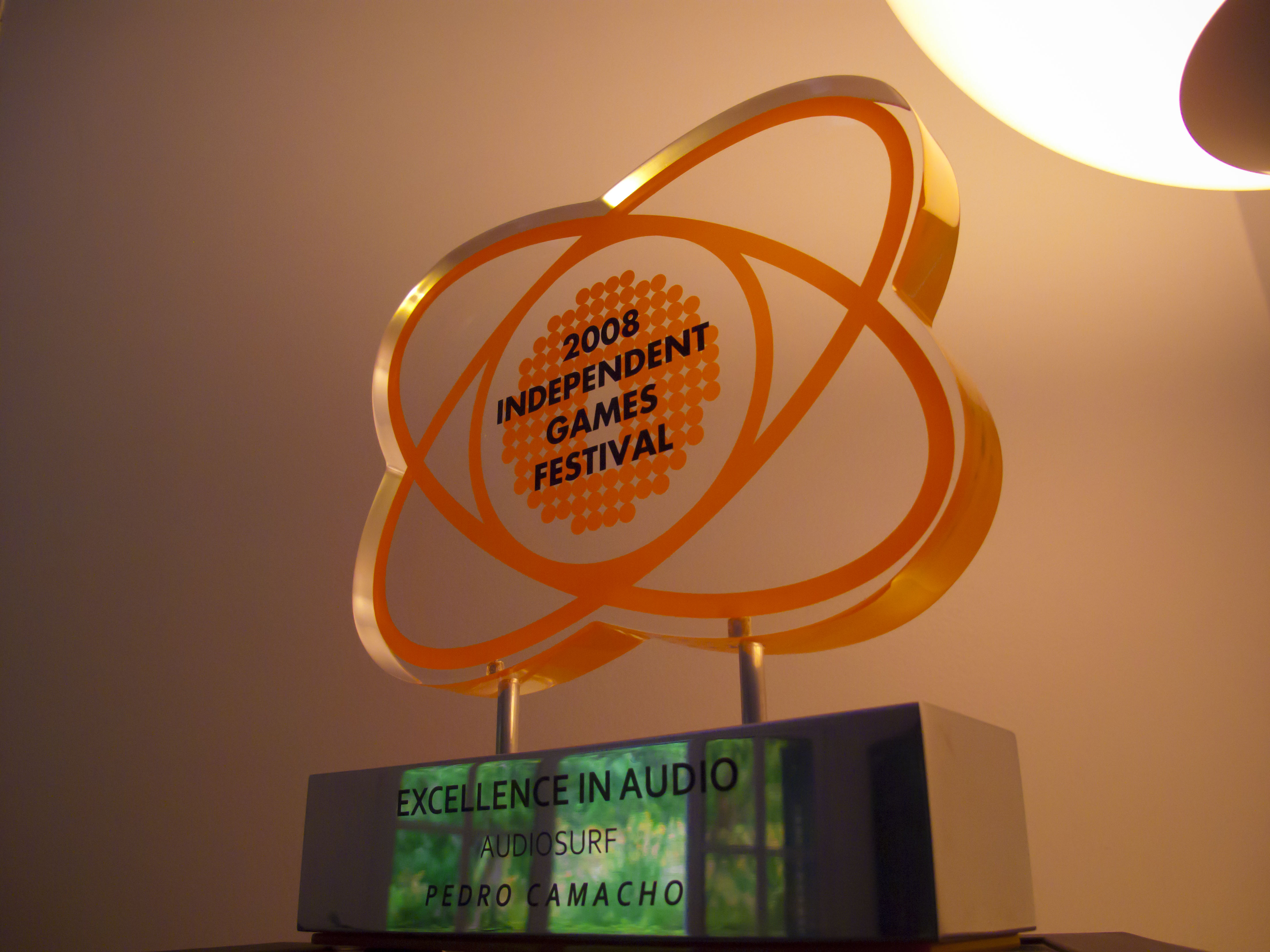
IGF 2008 Excellence in Audio Award won by Camacho for his work on Audiosurf

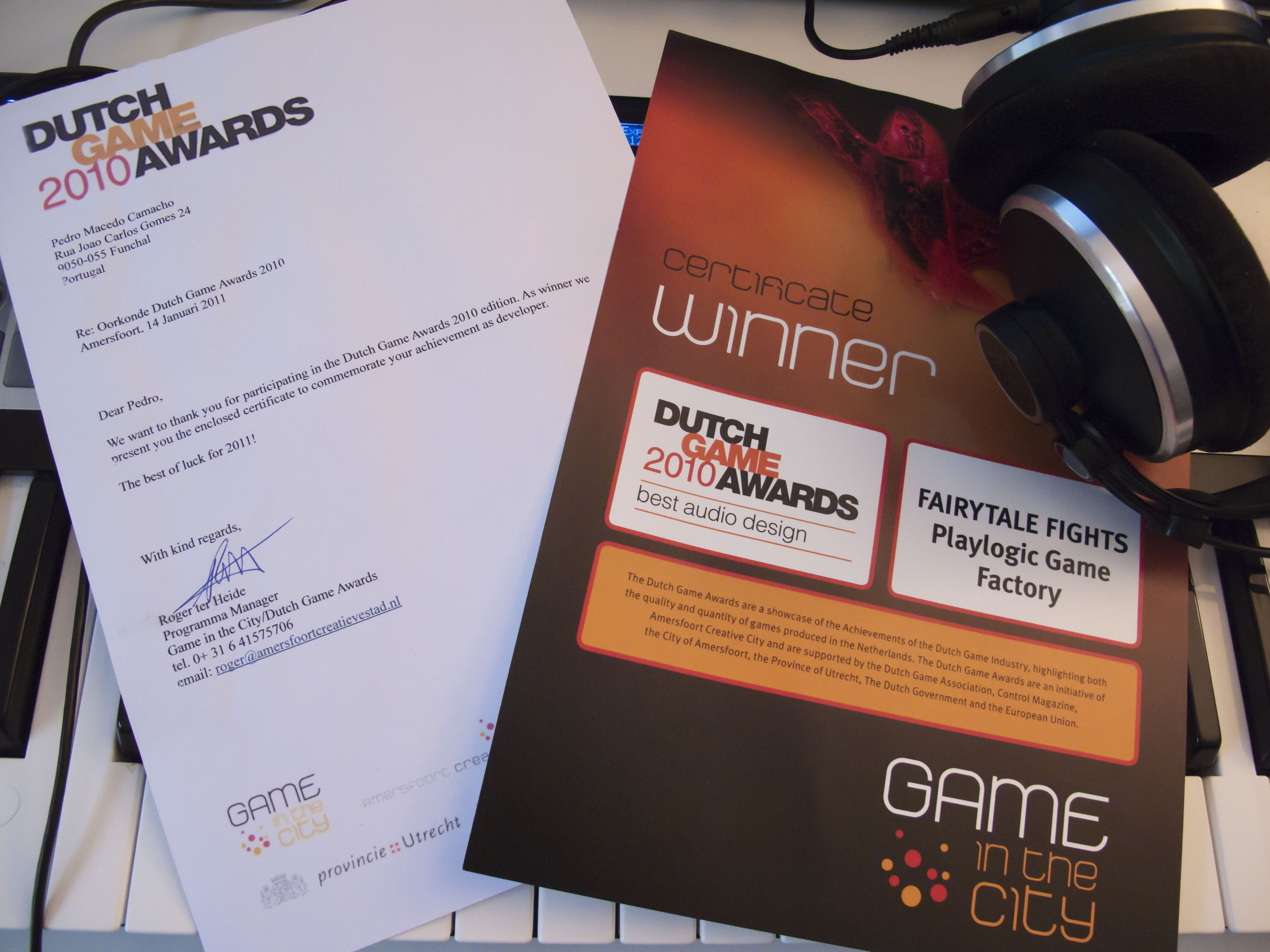
Dutch Games Awards 2010 Best Audio Design Award won by Camacho for his work on Fairytale Fights

== Awards and nominations ==
Year	Award	Nominated work	Result
2008	Independent Games Festival Excellence in Audio Award	Audiosurf	Won
2010	Dutch Games Awards Best Audio Design	Fairytale Fights	Won
2015	Motion Picture Sound Editors Awards	Star Citizen	Nominated
2017	Cannes Lions International Festival of Creativity	AMCV Doctors	Nominated
2018	D.I.C.E. Awards	Wolfenstein II: The New Colossus	Nominated
2022	13th Hollywood Music in Media Awards Best Score - Video Game	CHORUS	Won
2022	13th Hollywood Music in Media Awards Best Song - Video Game	CHORUS Main Theme featuring Úyanga Bold	Nominated
