= Snuggle Truck =

2011 video game

- App icon
- Developer: Owlchemy Labs
- Publisher: Owlchemy Labs
- Producers: Alex Schwartz; Yilmaz Kiymaz
- Designer: Alex Schwartz
- Programmer: Yilmaz Kiymaz
- Artist: Bill Tiller
- Composers: Daniel DP Perry; Brian Dutton; Luke Thomas
- Engine: Unity
- Platforms: iOS, Mac OS X, Windows, Blackberry PlayBook, Nokia N9, Linux, Android
- Release: April 28, 2011: iOS
- Genre: racing
- Mode: Single-player

Snuggle Truck is a 2011 side-scrolling racing game developed by the American studio Owlchemy Labs. Approximately two million copies have been downloaded for iOS, with 1.3 million downloads during the 9 days after becoming free-to-play. On March 26, 2012, both Snuggle Truck and Smuggle Truck were included in the Humble Bundle for Android 2, though the latter is only available on Android. On February 3, 2012, it was released on Windows through Steam.

== Development ==
Originally, the game was titled Smuggle Truck and involved smuggling immigrants across the United States border. It was rejected by the App Store because of its subject matter. The characters were swapped for stuffed animals, now revolving around getting them into a zoo, and the game retitled Snuggle Truck in 2011.
