= Jack Lumber =

2012 video game

- Developer: Owlchemy Labs
- Publishers: Sega (iOS); Owlchemy Labs (Win, Mac, Lin, Droid)
- Platforms: iOS; Microsoft Windows; OS X Linux; Android; Windows Phone
- Release: iOS; 16 August 2012; Windows, OS X, Linux; 30 April 2013; Android; 19 July 2013; Windows Phone; 16 July 2014
- Genres: Arcade, action
- Mode: Single-player

Jack Lumber is a video game developed by Owlchemy Labs. The iOS version was the first game published by Sega's third-party publishing program Sega Alliance.

In addition to mobile stores, the game is also available on Steam. This version was released independent of Sega because, according to Owlchemy Labs founder Alex Schwartz, "[W]orking with publishers has been a big experiment, and so far it hasn't been financially successful for Owlchemy." There are also plans to release it on other platforms that "don't involve a publisher."

== Plot ==
At the beginning of the game, a cutscene shows the death of lumberjack protagonist Jack Lumber's grandma when an evil tree falls on her. Jack is outraged, and goes on a rampage, cutting down every tree he sees on his way to fight the evil tree and keeping the animals he comes across in his cabin. The story progresses through letters from a competing lumberjack and a park ranger.

== Gameplay ==
The game is a slicing game along the lines of Fruit Ninja, but according to Eli Hodapp of Touch Arcade, "it feels like the game is only merely inspired by the Fruit Ninja mechanic instead of just falling in line with other re-skins and clones". In order to avenge Jack's grandma, the player must slice logs that fly across the screen longways, and sometimes with additional restrictions like multiple required swipes or logs you can only cut in one direction. When the player begins a swipe, the logs slow to "Lumbertime" (extreme slowdown) and a countdown timer begins. The player must slice all the logs correctly before the time runs out. Bonus points are awarded for special slices such as straight shots and syrup bottles, and woodland animals sometimes show up that need to be avoided.

Like many mobile games, unlockables abound and in-app purchases are available. Beards increase the difficulty but give higher point values, syrup gives the player certain one-time perks like the ability to redo a cut, and paintings provide decoration in Jack's cabin. Optional side missions are assigned three at a time and give small bonuses of logs, the in-game currency. Completing the main game will unlock "Infinitree" mode, a mode with endless logs to cut and three lives.

== Reception ==
Reception

Aggregate score
Aggregator	Score
GameRankings	85.00%

Review scores
Publication	Score
GameZone	8/10
IGN	8/10
Polygon	8.0/10
AppSpy	3/5
148Apps	4.5/5
MacLife	4/5

Polyon's Chris Plante titled his review "Axe-identally in love" and concluded by saying "Jack Lumber is quirky, stylized, and unlike anything on iOS." David Flodine of AppSpy said that it's "kinda like Fruit Ninja with bullet time". To promote the game, the developers showed it off at the 2012 World Lumberjack Championships.
