= Gaymer (disambiguation) =

Gaymer is an umbrella term used to refer to LGBTQ gamers.

Gaymer may also refer to:

- Gaymer Cider Company, an English cider company
- GaymerX, an American gaming convention
- Gail Gaymer Martin (1937–2023), American novelist
- Henry Gaymer (died 1596), English politician
- Janet Gaymer (born 1947), English lawyer

== See also ==
- Gayme (disambiguation)
