= Gaming in Color =

Gaming In Color
- Directed by: Philip Jones
- Written by: Philip Jones; Ryan Paul
- Produced by: Philip Jones; Ryan Paul; Anne Clements
- Starring: Colleen Macklin; George Skleres; Naomi Clark; Matthew Michael Brown; Joey Stern; Shane Cherry; Jessica Vazquez; Matt Conn
- Cinematography: Ryan Paul
- Edited by: Ryan Paul
- Music by: Matt Hopkins (2 Mello)
- Production company: MidBoss
- Distributed by: Devolver Digital Films
- Release date: April 22, 2014
- Running time: 62 minutes
- Country: United States
- Language: English
- Budget: $75,000

Gaming In Color is a documentary film by MidBoss about queer people in gaming. Directed by Philip Jones, Gaming In Color focuses on lesbian, gay, bisexual, transgender, and queer (LGBTQ) issues in video games, gaymer culture and events, and the rise of queer themes in gaming. The film is largely interview based, and features notable gay gaming personalities in the industry and communities.

George Skleres from Riot Games and Colleen Macklin star in the film, both of whom appeared at the GaymerX convention, a prominent topic.

== History ==
The film was funded on Kickstarter in May 2013, with 1,026 backers, pledging $51,158. The successful Kickstarter campaign came after an initial campaign seeking $125,000 was cancelled. The new campaign noted that resources had been donated and the film's crew had changed, so the new campaign reflected an adjusted budget of $50,000. It was filmed throughout 2013, conducting individual interviews as well as shooting a great amount of GaymerX in August. The crew worked to include varied stories and experiences that fell into the same broad category. Later in 2013, the film was acquired by MidBoss who completed the filming, editing, and all post-production, releasing it on their own.

On April 22, 2014, Gaming In Color released for digital sales on their VHX distribution page. Throughout the year, the film screened at game conventions, festivals, queer events, universities, and tech camps worldwide, including events at MIT, UC Berkeley, and GaymerX2. The film won Best Documentary at the Gen Con 2014 Film Festival, and later screened several times on Twitch to over 20,000 combined live viewers.

In January 2015, MidBoss announced that Gaming In Color would be partnering with Devolver Digital and their film branch for the film's major digital distribution, and released the news that Gaming In Color will launch on iTunes, Amazon, PlayStation, Xbox, and Vudu on May 19.

== Plot ==
Common topics in the film include why games matter, what a game is, what they do for individuals, and how they affect culture are explored. Sexuality in culture bridges the gap to sexuality in games, to make room for the topic of non-traditional sexualities and expressions being a part of culture, and thus video games. Hate speech and bigotry are common in online spaces, and how that affects people personally when they play games is commented on. Solutions to harmful activity is postulated, and many point to the GaymerX convention for doing good work in creating a safe space in adding visibility, to influence a more open-minded gaming community, as well as more LGBTQ characters in mainstream games.

The film also stars Naomi Clark, Joey Stern (Geeks OUT organizer), Shane Cherry (NYC Gaymers promoter), Jessica Vazquez (games journalist), and Matthew Michael Brown ("Gaymer" of The Tester, Season 2 winner). Everyone in the main cast is either LGBTQ, and/or active in gay gaming work of some kind. Many GaymerX attendees also make appearances, including GameRevolution’s Editor in Chief, Nick Tan.
