= Steven Blum (disambiguation) =

Steve Blum (born 1960) is an American voice actor.

Steven Blum may also refer to:

- H Steven Blum (born 1946), U.S. Army general
- Steven G. Blum, American attorney and educator
- Stephen Blum (born 1942), American educator and ethnomusicologist
- Stephen Blum, founder of PubNub
