= Gail Martin =

Gail Martin may refer to:

- Gail Z. Martin (born 1962), American writer and author
- Gail R. Martin (1944–2026), American biologist attributed with coining the term "embryonic stem cell"
- Gail Gaymer Martin (1937–2023), American Christian speaker and novelist
- Gail Martin (1923–2013), Archery Hall of Fame Bow maker.

== See also ==
- Luis Miguel Gail Martín (born 1961), former Spanish footballer
