= LGBTQ themes in video games =

Lesbian, gay, bisexual, transgender and queer (LGBTQ) characters have been depicted in video games since the 1980s. GLAAD estimates games with LGBTQ characters or storylines account for less than 2% of all games, this could be seen as an example of heteronormativity, as when sexuality is used in game content, games generally rely on heterosexual narratives. While the frequency of LGBTQ content in video games has increased over time it has faced accusations of tokenism. In 2018, Sam Greer of GamesRadar+ found only 179 games commercially released games with any LGBTQ representation, only 83 of which have queer characters who are playable characters, and only 8 of those games feature a main character who is pre-written as queer as opposed to them being queer as an option. LGBTQ games and characters were one the targets of the Gamergate harassment campaign.

== Tropes ==
Video games contain a number of recurring tropes, themes and archetypes in regard to LGBTQ+ identity.

=== Bury Your Gays ===
As in other media, LGBT characters in games often suffer from the "bury your gays" trope, a trope where LGBTQ characters die or generally suffer. According to Kotaku, these characters are "largely defined by a pain that their straight counterparts do not share". Facing challenges that "serve as an in-world analogy for anti-LGBTQ bigotry", they are defined by tragedy that denies them a chance at happiness.

=== Comical and Villainous Gender-Variance ===
Meghan Blythe Adams gives examples of video games which depict gender-variant characters as humorous, pitiable, monstrous or all three. They argue that gender variant characters are often portrayed using stereotypes associated with transgender women and gay men with transphobic and homophobic depictions being presented as comedy. Gender variance has also been used as a tool to offer social commentary about sexism or homophobia. The censorship codes of Nintendo and Sega limited the usage of gender inversion to exclusion of cross-dressing until 1994.

== Depictions of LGBTQ characters ==
=== Transgender characters in video games ===
Capcom created Final Fight for the arcade in 1989. The game involved players choosing among three fighters on a quest to save the mayor's daughter, who was kidnapped by a criminal gang known as Mad Gear. In 1990, Capcom presented Nintendo with a version of the game for the 16-bit Super Nintendo Entertainment System (SNES). According to David Sheff's book Game Over, Nintendo stated that Capcom could not put a female enemy in a video game published for the SNES, as that violated Nintendo's ban on violence against women. Capcom countered that there were no female enemies in the game, revealing that the female characters Roxy and Poison were transsexuals. The characters were nevertheless removed from the international versions of the SNES port (the Japanese Super Famicom version retained the characters). However, in 1993, Sega obtained the rights to release the game for their Sega CD. In a sign of Sega's more liberal policies, Poison and Roxy could remain in the international versions, but with less-provocative clothing, and there could be no indication of their transgender status. (Sega of America later removed a homosexual boss and unlockable playable character called Ash from the international versions of Streets of Rage 3.)

In the 2016 role-playing video game Baldur's Gate: Siege of Dragonspear, there is an optional dialogue tree in which the cleric Mizhena mentions that she was raised as a boy, indicating that she is a trans woman. This, along with a reference to the Gamergate controversy, attracted contention resulting in online harassment and insults towards the developers, especially against the game's writer Amber Scott. The game's Steam, GOG and Metacritic pages were bombarded with complaints that the transgender reference constituted "political correctness," "LGBTQ tokenism", "SJW pandering" and pushing a political agenda. On an April 2016 post, Beamdog announced they would expand Mizhena's story, saying in part, "In retrospect, it would have been better served if we had introduced a transgender character with more development." Paul Tumburro of CraveOnline termed this as "spineless and disappointing" stating that Beamdog's founder Trent Oster refused to acknowledge the transphobic criticisms leveled at the game.

In The Legend of Zelda: Ocarina of Time, developers introduced a not-obviously gendered character named Sheik. Eventually, Sheik is revealed to be Princess Zelda in disguise. Sheik never self identifies with any set of pronouns in the game; however, a character in the game refers to Sheik with male pronouns. Sheik's presence and gender ambiguity in Ocarina of Time created the “Sheik Gender Debate.” Two sides were taken in this debate – one that believed Sheik was simply cross dressing. The other side believed that Sheik was Princess Zelda assuming a male gender identity using some sort of magic. In 2014, Polygon asked Nintendo for a comment on the “Sheik Gender Debate.” Bill Trinen gave an official statement saying “The definitive answer is that Sheik is a woman – simply Zelda in a different outfit.”

In the 2011 puzzle game, Catherine, Erica Anderson is revealed to be a transgender woman throughout the game. Erica's portrayal has sparked controversy throughout the years due to her identity being treated as a joke. During the true ending of Catherine, Toby, who had slept with Erica, learns of her identity and feels betrayed and disgusted. In the ending credits of the original release of the game, Erica is listed under her deadname, Eric Anderson. This was changed by Atlus in the 2019 PC release of Catherine.

In the 2017 Nintendo game, The Legend of Zelda: Breath of the Wild, Link cannot enter Gerudo Town unless he dresses up as a woman. The player must find a character named Vilia in order to buy the women's clothing for Link. Vilia outwardly appears female, but upon speaking to her, the noises made when she speaks are deep. During a dialogue sequence between Link and Vilia, Vilia's face mask blows off in the wind to reveal – to Link's surprise – what appears to be facial hair. It is revealed that Vilia is merely a cross-dressing male Hylian in official media, such as Creating a Champion. However, it is not uncommon for fans to consider Vilia to be a trans woman.

The 2018 indie game Celeste had hinted and led to speculation by media and players that the player-character, Madeline, was a trans woman. This was later confirmed by the game's lead developer, Maddy Thorson, who herself has come out as a trans woman, the game in part an allusion to her own identity issues prior to opting to coming out.

Released in 2020 by Dontnod Entertainment, Tell Me Why features two main characters, one of which being Tyler Ronan, a trans man and the first transgender protagonist to be featured in a triple-A video game. The development team worked closely with LGBT charity GLAAD in order to ensure that Tyler's story was an "authentic representation of the trans experience". As part of this, trans actor August Aiden Black was cast to voice Tyler and worked collaboratively with the writers and developers.

The Last of Us Part II, released in 2020, features a trans masculine character named Lev.

Bridget from the fighting game series Guilty Gear was first introduced as a child who was assigned male at birth, was raised as a girl due to the superstitions of her village, and was secure in her gender identity as a feminine-presenting boy. In the 2021 game Guilty Gear Strive, Bridget appears as a DLC character, and she comes out as a transgender woman.

=== Gay characters in fighting games ===
Having gay male characters in fighting games can challenge the perception of homosexuality and masculinity. Nevertheless, hints about a particular character's sexual orientation in a fighting game often take the form of stereotypical femininity in an otherwise tough masculine character.

In the Mortal Kombat series, Kung Jin is a homosexual character. The story mode of Mortal Kombat X features an exchange between Jin and Raiden that implies Jin's sexuality. Jin's homosexuality was confirmed by NetherRealm Studios cinematic director Dominic Cianciolo. The same game also implies that Mileena and Tanya are in a relationship, or at least show obvious attraction to each other.

In Fighting EX Layer, the character Sharon has been revealed to be lesbian, making her one of the first openly lesbian characters in a fighting game.

=== Gay characters in action games ===
In 1996, Night Slave was a shooter RPG released for the PC-98 that have cut scenes in which occasionally contain lesbian adult content.

The PlayStation 3 game The Last of Us (2013) was praised for its gay and lesbian characters, including teenage protagonist Ellie. GLAAD, the American organization promoting the image of LGBTQ people in the media, named the supporting character Bill one of "the most intriguing new LGBT characters of 2013".

=== LGBTQ visual novels and independent games ===
Many visual novels and independent games are created by independent creators and may sometimes include or be focused on LGBTQ themes and narratives. Many of these narratives themselves sometimes come from the personal perspective of a member of the development team. These depictions tend to be more similar to the struggles of being LGBTQ in the real world but often take place in universes where homosexuality is normalized and acceptable. One of the first known games with LGBTQ themes was Caper in the Castro in 1989, a detective adventure game that was written in the onset of the United States AIDS crisis when queer people were being mistreated and their struggles were being largely ignored. The game's author, C.M. Ralph, wrote the story to help promote awareness of LGBTQ themes of the time.

In the 2013 exploration visual novel Gone Home, the player takes on the role of a young woman who returns to her dilapidated household which is mysteriously empty. By collecting clues, she uncovers that her sister has recently come out to her family as a lesbian which caused an issue between the protagonist's parents and the elder daughter herself. This leaves the house in disarray and leaving the player a non-linear way of piecing together the situation.

In the 2015 action-visual novel Life Is Strange, the player takes on the role of Max Caulfield, an eighteen-year-old student and photographer who has discovered that she can turn back time at will. She uses this power to try and save her town after seeing its destruction in a vision in tandem with solving a mystery of a girl who had gone missing before the beginning of the story. Throughout the story, Max and Chloe Price bond. Chloe is a friend from Max's childhood and helps Max throughout the series as they try to stop the destruction of their town together as they develop a better understanding of one another as both friends and lovers. Chloe Price is an implied lesbian, while Max Caulfield's sexuality is mostly unknown. Ultimately, Life is Strange is met with some criticisms on the writing with the player ultimately having to choose between saving Chloe and letting all other characters and their town be destroyed or by letting Chloe die and saving the entirety of the town. If the player chooses a route where the main love interest is Chloe Price, the protagonist has a goodbye kiss in the Sacrifice Chloe ending.

In the 2017 independent visual novel Butterfly Soup, the player takes on the respective roles of four queer Asian-American girls who attend their first year of high school and their local baseball club. The plot mostly follows the lives of Diya and Mihn-Soo, and deals with many themes such as child abuse and homophobia but retains a very lighthearted theme overall.

In the 2017 visual novel Dream Daddy: A Dad Dating Simulator, the protagonist which is a created character, can assume the identity of a cisgender male, or a transgender male, and is also given the option to be bisexual or homosexual, which is denoted by having a conversation with the protagonist's daughter about her life up to this point. Most of the characters themselves don't reference their sexuality in any way, but some are clearly bisexual or at least, bi-curious, as evidenced by the character Joseph who in-game is married with a wife and several children but is still a romance-able character. The character Damian who is a romance-able option in the game is also revealed to be a transgender male at the beginning of his playable content as evidenced by his dialogue and his use of a chest binder.

In the 2018 visual novel Monster Prom, the player can play as one of four characters based on contemporary popular monsters in popular culture. Monster Prom is treated as a single-player experience and also a competitive experience. Monster Prom, while more on the side of fantasy deals with themes like coming of age situations and a queer outlook on specific historical events, as well as Lovecraftian fiction and aesthetics. Monster Prom also is the first major visual novel to include an option to identify as non-binary, with the option to use different pronouns at the beginning of the game.

== Same-sex relationships ==
Same-sex relationships as an option available to players in video games were first portrayed in the role-playing genre.

The original Game Boy game Great Greed, released in September 1992, featured the possibility of the player's male protagonist's marriage to a variety of characters at the end of the game that included any of the king's daughters (except the eleven year old), the elderly court magician, the queen, and even the king himself. While possibly not the absolute earliest appearance of same-sex relationships in video games it is much earlier than the current runner-up, Fallout 2.

Fallout 2 (1998) is the second game to allow players to marry a character of the same sex, and Persona 2: Innocent Sin (1999) allows players to engage in a same-sex relationship. Star Trek: Voyager – Elite Force (2000) depicted a romance between the player character and NPC Telsia Murphy, which played out the same way regardless of whether the player chose to play male "Alexander" or female "Alexandra". Fable (2004) allowed same-sex marriage among a wide range of domestic activities. In life simulator The Sims (2000), the sexual orientation of characters was set depending on the player's actions. However, same-sex couples were described as "roommates", and they could not get married. Same-sex marriage was made available in the 2004 sequel Sims 2.

BioWare's RPGs, including the Star Wars: Knights of the Old Republic series (since 2003), Mass Effect series (since 2007), and Dragon Age series (since 2009) are particularly noted for their inclusion of LGBT characters and same-sex romance options. The Elder Scrolls series made same-sex relationships available in The Elder Scrolls V: Skyrim (2011). Among Japanese RPG series, Final Fantasy allowed same-sex relationships with a patch to Final Fantasy XIV in 2014, and Fire Emblem did so with Fire Emblem Fates (2016).

The release of The Temple of Elemental Evil, a role-playing video game developed by Troika Games, created controversy in 2003 due to the availability of the option for a male character to enter a same-sex marriage. In the town of Nulb, a pirate named Bertram begins flirting with male characters in the party and offers a lifetime of love and happiness in exchange for his freedom. This relationship was noted as another example of video games "pushing the boundaries" by The Guardian. Game developers and publishers generally did not object to the inclusion of a homosexual story option. Criticism of the relationship came primarily from gamers who felt that gay characters should not be included in video games. Industry observer Matthew D. Barton commented on the irony of so-called "geeky gamers", subject to stereotyping themselves, stereotyping gays in their opposition. Producer Tom Decker defended the move, saying in an interview with RPG Vault: "I particularly felt strongly that since we had several heterosexual marriages available in Hommlet, we should include at least one homosexual encounter in the game and not to make it a stereotyped, over the top situation, but on par with the other relationships available in the game". Bertram was named #6 on GayGamer.net's Top 20 Gayest Video Game Characters.

Undertale (2015) which won IGN's best PC Game of 2015 features a gender-neutral playable main character, Frisk. During the game, depending on the route the player takes, may encounter a dating simulation in which the gender of both parties are unclear and a major plot line is the development of a lesbian relationship between Undyne and Alphys.

The Outer Worlds (2019) features companion Parvati Holcomb, an asexual homoromantic, who can develop a relationship with Junlei Tennyson, a fellow engineer, with the help of the player by means of a sidequest.

Kingdom Come: Deliverance II (2025) introduced same-sex romance into the series for the first time with the addition of two male love interests for the series' main character Henry. The most significant love interest, Sir Hans Capon (based on the historical figure Jan Ptáček of Pirkštejn), had been previously introduced in Kingdom Come: Deliverance as Henry's best friend.

== LGBTQ themes by company or market ==
=== Company policies ===
==== Nintendo ====
In order to legally release a game for a Nintendo system, a developer must first obtain permission from Nintendo, which reserves the right to preview the games and demand changes before allowing their release. In this way, Nintendo exercises quality control and can prevent any content they deem objectionable or offensive from being released on their systems. Prior to the introduction of the Entertainment Software Rating Board in 1994, a game sold for a Nintendo system could neither display, nor make reference to, illicit drugs, tobacco and alcohol, violence against women, blood and graphic violence, profanity, nudity, religious symbols, political advocacy, or "sexually suggestive or explicit content."

In 1988, a creature in Nintendo's Super Mario Bros. 2, the miniboss named Birdo, was described in the original instruction manual as thinking he was a girl and wanting to be called "Birdetta". This was later censored by Nintendo of America in future appearances of the character. In 1992, Enix was ordered to remove a gay bar from Dragon Warrior III, among other content changes, before the game could be sold for a Nintendo system. The SNES version of Ultima VII: The Black Gate also had to be substantially altered from its original computer edition in order to remove potentially objectionable content, including ritual murders, and the option to have a male or female "bedmate" if the player paid a fee at the buccaneer-run island.

By the late 1990s, Nintendo had largely abandoned these censorship policies, as they felt the inclusion of ESRB ratings on the packaging would suitably communicate to consumers whether potentially objectionable content could be found in the game. In 2000, British video game developer Rare released Banjo-Tooie for the Nintendo 64, featuring a gay frog bartender named "Jolly Roger." The frog wanted Banjo & Kazooie to rescue his co-worker, Merry Maggie, a cross-dressing amphibian who appeared to be Jolly Roger's lover. Jolly Roger would return as a playable character in the Game Boy Advance game Banjo-Pilot (2005). Rare would also release Conker's Bad Fur Day (2001) for the Nintendo 64, featuring an alcoholic squirrel named Conker and his adventures in a world where all of the characters are foul-mouthed creatures who made various dirty jokes in reference to hangovers, homosexuality and oral sex. Enix re-released Dragon Warrior III for the Game Boy Color and was allowed to keep all of the original content, provided the game was given a Teen rating by the ESRB.

Although there is no policy anymore against featuring such content, Nintendo has come under fire for omitting the option of same-sex romance and LGBTQ expression in their franchises (as well as third-party games released on Nintendo Consoles) on several occasions, with the most notable and vocal controversy stemming from the video game Tomodachi Life. Marriage plays a big role in the game, which does not include the option of same-sex marriage. In 2026, Nintendo released Tomodachi Life: Living the Dream on the Nintendo Switch, which allowed same sex marriages and non-binary identity options.

With the release of the Nintendo Switch, the current Nintendo president, Shuntaro Furukawa has been quoted, saying that the company will not censor third party releases, believing that the rating systems such as CERO and the ESRB for example, are more than enough to provide content regulation as well as the built in parental controls. Since then, games with LGBTQ themes and expressions have been released on the console itself unchanged, with ports such as Dream Daddy: A Dad Dating Simulator and 2064: Read Only Memories listed on the eShop itself. Nintendo's stance on this applying to their first party franchises however is currently unknown, though the release of Animal Crossing: New Horizons made news over its genderless options.

==== Sega ====
Like Nintendo, Sega policed the content of games for Sega systems. Unlike Nintendo, Sega's initial system of censorship was more liberal. Their content code allowed games to have blood, more graphic violence, female enemies, and more sexually suggestive themes.

Although Sega allowed LGBTQ themes and characters in games sold for its home console systems, Sega often chose to tone down or erase LGBT characters when porting Asian games to American markets. In Phantasy Star II, a musician's homosexuality was edited so that the only acknowledgment of his sexual orientation was his practice of charging all male characters less money for his music lessons.

In 1992, when Final Fight CD was released for the Sega CD and Vendetta was released for the Sega Genesis, minor transgender and homosexual enemies were censored. Sega removed a gay villain from Streets of Rage 3 wearing Village People-esque attire.

=== Entertainment Software Rating Board (ESRB) ===
In 1994, several top gaming publishers formed the Entertainment Software Association (ESA) as the trade association of the video game industry. Shortly after its creation, the ESA established the Entertainment Software Rating Board (ESRB) to independently assign individual games content ratings and descriptors according to a variety of factors. Identification of sexuality falls under the sexual content description which is allowed for games rated Teen to Adults Only.

Following the establishment of the ESRB, console developers relaxed their in-house regulations in favor of ESRB ratings. In 1994, Sega dissolved its Videogame Rating Council after only one year in existence.

=== Asian games ===
Most games made in Japan, Korea and Taiwan are produced for local audiences. In Japanese popular culture, gay and bisexual men were often considered bishōnen, which translates as "beautiful boys." This was also tied to the success in Japan of comic books and animation with open and subtle LGBTQ characters. A select genre of adult pornographic Japanese games called H-games includes gay male and gay female subgenres. This material generally does not make it over to the west in English, and western reviews of the gay male video games tend to see the homosexuality as a gimmick in an otherwise mediocre game. However, homosexuality, while relatively innocuous among celebrities in Japan, can still be considered an oddity due to Japan's regimented and conservative social structure. Despite a lack of strong social stigma, homosexuality in men is commonly misconstrued with transgenderism and transvestism in Japan and open homosexuality is rare, due to conformity.

== Marketing to LGBTQ consumers ==
The belief that young, white, heterosexual males were the force driving the industry forward was strongly challenged by the record-breaking success of The Sims. Video game developer Maxis had resisted Will Wright's goal of creating the title on the grounds that "girls don't play video games." The title was seen as unappealing to young heterosexual males. In the 1990s, the industry began to make some effort to market games to women by creating software titles with strong, independent female characters, such as those in Tomb Raider and Resident Evil. Some video game companies are now moving to further expand their marketing base to include the perceived market of affluent homosexual young men by including LGBT characters and supporting LGBTQ rights.

BioWare included female same-sex scenes in Mass Effect, female same-sex relationships in Mass Effect 2 and same-sex relationships for either gender in Mass Effect 3, and allowed sexual interaction between any gender groups in Dragon Age: Origins. In Dragon Age II, this was taken even further by allowing all romance-able party members to be romanced by any gender (with the exception of a particular DLC-only companion), as opposed to the first game's requirement of choosing between two bisexual rogues.

== Recognition ==
GLAAD announced it had created a new category to recognize video games and debuting in its 30th Annual GLAAD Media Awards in 2019, acknowledging those games with positive depictions of LGBTQ themes.

== Criticism ==
Critics of the suppression of gay identity often conclude that, as homosexuality is normalized in broader culture, it will be in video games as well.

A 2006 survey exploring gay gamers was the first academic study of any gamer group. With about 10,000 respondents, the survey exhibited a reverse bell curve of gamer sexuality, with most people identifying as either completely heterosexual or homosexual.

A 2009 academic paper explored the cultural production of LGBTQ representation in video games and found that factors that would lead to a significant increase in LGBTQ content included: the presence of motivated producers in the industry (those that are personally, politically, or commercially interested in LGBTQ content), how the audience for a text or medium is constructed (what the public backlash from both the LGBTQ community and conservative groups will be, as well as industry-based reprisals in the form of censorship or ratings), the structure of the industry and how it is funded, and how homosexuality, bisexuality, or transgender identities can be represented in the medium.

== See also ==
- Gaymer
- GaymerX
- Gender representation in video games
- List of video games with LGBT characters
- LGBTQ themes in Western animation
- LGBTQ themes in anime and manga
- Media portrayal of LGBTQ people
