= And You Thought There Is Never a Girl Online? =

Japanese light novel series

- And You Thought There Is Never a Girl Online
- First light novel volume cover featuring Ako Tamaki

ネトゲの嫁は女の子じゃないと思った? (Netoge no Yome wa Onna no Ko Janai to Omotta?)
- Genre: Romantic comedy
- Light novel
- Written by: Shibai Kineko
- Illustrated by: Hisasi
- Published by: ASCII Media Works
- Imprint: Dengeki Bunko
- Original run: July 10, 2013 – present
- Volumes: 24
- Manga
- Written by: Shibai Kineko
- Illustrated by: Kazui Ishigami
- Published by: ASCII Media Works
- Magazine: Dengeki G's Comic
- Original run: August 30, 2014 – September 29, 2018
- Volumes: 8
- Anime television series
- Directed by: Shinsuke Yanagi
- Produced by: Kei Fukura; Takao Kiyose
- Written by: Tatsuya Takahashi; Gō Zappa; Shibai Kineko
- Music by: Maiko Iuchi
- Studio: Project No.9
- Licensed by: Crunchyroll; AUS: Madman Entertainment; NA: Universal Pictures; UK: MVM Films
- Original network: AT-X, Tokyo MX, BS11, Sun TV
- Original run: April 7, 2016 – June 23, 2016
- Episodes: 12
- icon

And You Thought There Is Never a Girl Online? (Japanese: ネトゲの嫁は女の子じゃないと思った?, Hepburn: Netoge no Yome wa Onna no Ko Janai to Omotta?; lit. "You Thought Your Online Game Wife Wasn't a Girl?") is a Japanese light novel series, written by Shibai Kineko and illustrated by Hisasi. ASCII Media Works has published twenty-three volumes since 2013 under their Dengeki Bunko imprint. A manga adaptation with art by Kazui Ishigami was serialized in ASCII Media Works' seinen manga magazine Dengeki G's Comic from August 30, 2014, to September 29, 2018, and has been collected in eight tankōbon volumes. An anime television series adaptation by Project No.9 aired from April 7, 2016, to June 23, 2016.

== Premise ==
Teenager Hideki Nishimura plays a massively multiplayer online role-playing game called Legendary Age (LA), but one day he proposes online to a girl who tells him she is really a man, so he swears off online marriages. Two years later, he has been involved with a guild and eventually accepts an in-game marriage offer from his persistent guildmate, Ako. When the guild has their first-ever real-life meeting, Hideki is shocked to discover that his teammates are not only all girl gamers, but they also attend his school. The story follows their adventures as they form a school club to play the game while Hideki tries to help Ako, who is infatuated with Hideki as his game character, try to separate fantasy from reality.

== Characters ==
Hideki Nishimura (西村 英騎, Nishimura Hideki)
Voiced by: Toshiyuki Toyonaga (Japanese); Dallas Reid (English)
The viewpoint character of the light novels, Hideki is a first-year high school student who plays Legendary Age (LA), under the name Rusian (ルシアン, Rushian), a male knight. At first, he distrusts girls online after having been rejected by a girl who told him that she was actually a guy in real life. He is Ako's in-game husband in Legendary Age after reluctantly accepting her many repeated in-game proposals. Over the course of the series, Hideki begins to develop real feelings for Ako and attempts to help her differentiate reality from the gaming world. Outside of LA, he is an otaku.^{LN 1}

Ako Tamaki (玉置 亜子, Tamaki Ako)
Voiced by: Rina Hidaka (Japanese); Trina Nishimura (English)
The cover girl of the series, Ako is Hideki's schoolmate who goes by the game name Ako (アコ), a female cleric, in LA. She was first Hideki's in-game wife as a result of her repeated in-game proposals to him and his reluctant acceptance.^{LN 1} In real life, she attends the same school as Hideki, but was often absent due to her heavy addiction to the online game. She was shy and a loner at school, but is extremely happy to meet Rusian in real life. She had a hard time distinguishing between the gaming world and reality, as she believed she is Hideki's actual wife and will often and casually call her guildmates by their game character names at school. Occasionally, Ako would go into psychotic trances in reaction to non-gaming "normies", saying that they should die.^{LN 1} Ironically, despite being a recluse at first, she is the only one in the group that can cook.

Akane Segawa (瀬川 茜, Segawa Akane)
Voiced by: Inori Minase (Japanese); Jad Saxton (English) (Note: In the first few episodes, Akane's in-game character Schwein is voiced by Masaya Matsukaze in the Japanese dub,^{Ep. 1} and by Jessie James Grelle in the English dub.)
A petite twin-tailed blonde classmate, she despised otakus at first and didn't like when Hideki acted like one or tried to interact with her. However, she is actually a gamer herself under the moniker Schwein (シュヴァイン, Shuvain), a male knight (sword dancer). Her character name is German for pig, which she did not know until Kyo informs her offline, much to her chagrin. Although she is popular at school, she had turned down many boys so she can have more gaming time.^{LN 1}

Kyō Goshōin (御聖院 杏, Goshōin Kyō)
Voiced by: M·A·O (Japanese); Mallorie Rodak (English) (Note: In the first few episodes, Kyo's in-game character Apricot is voiced by Wataru Hatano in the Japanese dub,^{Ep. 1} and by J. Michael Tatum in the English dub.)
The student council president at Hideki's school and the leader of the Alley Cats guild in LA. She has long dark hair and goes under the character name Apricot (アプリコット, Apurikotto), a male mage at the beginning of the series. Her guild mates call her Master. She comes from a wealthy family; her father is on the school board, and her family has several companies. She often uses in-game purchases to boost her game attributes, but does not depend on her family's money but on her personal investments to fund it. Outside of the guild, she didn't have any friends as her family didn't give her much chance to socialize. She sponsors the creation of the school's game club.^{LN 1}

Nanako Akiyama (秋山 奈々子, Akiyama Nanako)
Voiced by: Hitomi Ōwada (Japanese); Tia Ballard (English)
Akane's friend who discovers she plays online games, and agrees to keep it a secret. Shortly afterwards, she begins playing LA under the character name Sette (セッテ),^{Ep. 5} who is a summoner. She has purplish-blue hair then pink in the anime.

Yui Saito (斉藤 結衣, Saitō Yui)
Voiced by: Yoshino Nanjō (Japanese); Monica Rial (English)
Hideki's teacher who watches over him and the girls, and becomes their club's advisor.^{Ep. 3} She gives him advice on how to interact with girls and balance his gaming life. It is later revealed that she was the LA player Nekohime (猫姫), a catgirl who rejected Hideki's in-game proposal two years prior, stating that she was actually a guy.^{LN 1} She has a large fan following in LA.

== Media ==
The first light novel volume was published on July 10, 2013, by ASCII Media Works under their Dengeki Bunko imprint. As of February 2026, twenty-four volumes have been published.

=== Light novel ===
No.	Japanese release date	Japanese ISBN
1	July 10, 2013	978-4-04-891799-5
2	October 10, 2013	978-4-04-866030-3
3	February 8, 2014	978-4-04-866332-8
4	May 10, 2014	978-4-04-866572-8
5	August 9, 2014	978-4-04-866780-7
6	December 10, 2014	978-4-04-869090-4
7	April 10, 2015	978-4-04-865065-6
8	August 8, 2015	978-4-04-865340-4
9	December 10, 2015	978-4-04-865587-3
10	April 9, 2016	978-4-04-865914-7
11	June 10, 2016	978-4-04-865956-7
12	October 8, 2016	978-4-04-892452-8
13	February 10, 2017	978-4-04-892664-5
14	June 9, 2017	978-4-04-892952-3
15	October 7, 2017	978-4-04-893401-5
16	February 10, 2018	978-4-04-893615-6
17	June 9, 2018	978-4-04-893900-3
18	November 10, 2018	978-4-04-912098-1
19	April 10, 2019	978-4-04-912460-6
20	September 10, 2019	978-4-04-912799-7
21	April 10, 2020	978-4-04-913182-6
22	November 10, 2023	978-4-04-913582-4
23	December 8, 2023	978-4-04-915142-8
24	February 10, 2026	978-4-04-915603-4

=== Manga ===
No.	Japanese release date	Japanese ISBN
1	March 10, 2015	978-4-04-869365-3
2	October 10, 2015	978-4-04-865470-8
3	April 9, 2016	978-4-04-865918-5
4	June 10, 2016	978-4-04-865919-2
5	February 2, 2017	978-4-04-892703-1
6	October 7, 2017	978-4-04-893352-0
7	March 10, 2018	978-4-04-893731-3
8	November 10, 2018	978-4-04-912183-4

=== Anime ===
An anime television series adaptation by Project No.9 aired from April 7 to June 23, 2016, on AT-X. The opening theme is "1st Love Story" by Luce Twinke Wink☆, while the ending theme is "Zero Ichi Kiseki" (ゼロイチキセキ; lit. 'Zero One Miracle') by Yoshino Nanjō. Following Sony's acquisition of Crunchyroll, the series was moved to Crunchyroll. Universal Pictures originally announced that they would release the series in the UK. However, it was later revealed that MVM Entertainment would release the series within the region.

No.	Official English title (Note: All English titles are taken from Funimation.) Original Japanese title	Original release date
1	"And you thought there is never a girl online?" "Netoge no Yome wa Onnanoko Janai to Omotta?" (Japanese: ネトゲの嫁は女の子じゃないと思った？)	April 7, 2016
In the MMORPG Legendary Age, Hideki Nishimura (in-game name Rusian) receives a marriage proposal from his guild mate Ako who has been persistently asking him. Along with players Schwein and Apricot, they are members of the Alley Cats guild. In the real world, Hideki is a high school student who openly expresses otaku behavior amongst his friends, leading to regular disapproval by classmate Akane Segawa. In game, Rusian ultimately accepts Ako's proposal, and reveals to his guild mates that his hesitation stemmed from his previously proposing to a female character named Nekohime, only for the latter to turn him down and confess to be a cross-player (a guy playing a girl). Apricot organizes a real life meeting of the guild members. While Hideki is shocked that Ako is actually a real girl named Ako Tamaki, even more surprising are Apricot and Schwein's real identities, which are student council president Kyo Goshoin and Akane, respectively. While the members formally introduce their real life selves and share their common dislike for "normies" (non-gamers), Hideki is still in disbelief at Ako's true beauty in contrast to her 2D appearance.
2	"I thought we couldn't play net games at school?" "Gakkō ja Netoge wa Dekinai to Omotta?" (Japanese: 学校じゃネトゲはできないと思った？)	April 14, 2016
Hideki apologizes for assuming his guild mates were all guys, and they all look forward to seeing each other at school, although Akane and Hideki agree to keep their real life apart from their game life and interact like they usually do at school. On LA, Hideki begins to picture Schwein and Apricot as their real-life girl counterparts. The next day, Ako visits but casually calls Hideki by his online alias Rusian, and declares that she is his wife, catching the other students' attention. Hideki and Akane pull Ako aside and try several ways to explain that their school life and game life are supposed to be separate. However, Ako perceives this as their not wanting to be her friend. Kyo organizes a Net Game club and recruits Hideki, Akane, and Ako. The club's purpose is to enable Ako to play with her guild mates under the same building to demonstrate the coexistence of her real and gaming friends. Later that day, Rusian surprisingly meets Nekohime in the game.
3	"I thought net games and reality were different?" "Netoge to Riaru wa Chigau to Omotta?" (Japanese: ネトゲとリアルは違うと思った？)	April 21, 2016
Homeroom teacher Saito tells Hideki that Ako has been attending school more and opening up a little thanks to him, and tasks him to watch over her. As the Net Game Club finishes another gaming session, Akane dotes on how the club's activities have blurred the distinction between fantasy and reality for Ako even more. The club has a limited time to find a faculty advisor or be disbanded. After Rusian consults Nekohime for advice, Hideki tries his luck to reassure Ako of the distinction, only to later have an overly jealous Ako stalk Rusian in the game talking to Nekohime. Ako stops going to school again, but later appears at the guild hub telling players that she is going to have an offline meeting with an unknown stranger. Akane and Kyo confront Hideki to try and stop Ako as Hideki admits that spending time with the real Ako has made him develop feelings for her outside the game. Hideki runs to the contact place to persuade Ako to not meet the person but then Saito shows up. Hideki discovers Saito is actually Nekohime. Kyo recruits Saito to be the club's new advisor.
4	"I thought her secret wasn't going to get out?" "Ano Ko no Himitsu ga Barenai to Omotta?" (Japanese: あの子の秘密がバレないと思った？)	April 28, 2016
As Hideki notices Ako's usual behavior getting worse and the club members sympathizing with her, Ms. Saito proposes to shut down the club and to quit gaming for the remaining school term, to which Kyo threatens her again with her Nekohime accent. Shortly after under Kyo's persuasion, the players try their luck with Legendary Age's mystery box feature, to which Ako's pulls yield underwhelming luck. After Hideki cheers her up with popsicles, Ako is in distress the following day as rumors about her and Hideki's relationship begin to surface and starts becoming a center of attention to other girls. As Hideki seeks advice from his fellow players about it, Akane's friend Nanako Akiyama walks inside the club room, and Akane becomes shaken as Nanako questions her about the club and why she's there. Frantically covering up for herself, Akane is left in despair after shoving her friend out the door. Meanwhile in the game, as they are waiting for Schwein and Master, Rusian and Ako explore the sights and briefly crosses paths with Nekohime and her crazy fanatic guild. After saving a newbie player named Sette, she learns the basics of the game from Rusian while triggering Ako's jealousy. As Akane is in high spirits the next day for having Nanako keep her gaming secret, Alley Cats prepares for another quest as Sette finds Rusian and runs into his guild.
5	"I thought reincarnating would give me my big chance?" "Tensei Sureba Wanchan Aru to Omotta?" (Japanese: 転生すればワンチャンあると思った？)	May 5, 2016
As Rusian explains to the guild that Sette is a fresh player, Schwein offers to teach her, to which she playfully declines. The next day, as Ako suggests that the club should play a different game, Kyo's searches result in them playing the FPS game Ultra Force, using Ako's hatred of normies to snipe targets with exceptional skill. After an all-night Ultra Force gaming session, a sleep-deprived Hideki finds Ako exhibiting behavior similar to the game, while Nanako questions them on their whereabouts within Legendary Age. Hideki and the others soon realize her identity as Sette within the game, and while a dazed Akane rocks back and forth, a frustrated Ako storms off after Nanako clarifies her in-game marriage as her perception of a way to take Hideki away from her. After no signs of communication with Ako in the real world, Hideki decides to talk to Ako in the game, revealing her intention of maxing out her level and reincarnating as a different character. Completely devoted to playing Legendary Age, Ako has blocked the in-game chat as well, leaving Hideki to bring back Ako on his own. Deciding to confront Ako at her house, Ako's mom gives Hideki the key to her room, where he helps her to max out her character. Staying at her house overnight, Rusian and Ako confront their fellow players in the morning with Hideki intending to drop out of school like Ako, and while Ako goes against it, he states that the players will miss her as much as they do him. Knowing how she really feels and empathizing with her struggle with reality, Hideki convinces Ako to come back to school again, standing by her side all the way.
6	"I thought if I declared my love, I was sure to succeed?" "Kokuhaku Shitara Seikō Kakutei Da to Omotta?" (Japanese: 告白したら成功確定だと思った？)	May 12, 2016
As Rusian shares a story about Yuyun, a crossplay-marrying player he met during his solo playing days, he struggles to get his feelings of affection across to Ako outside the game. As Nanako tries to help Ako adjust to real-life conventions, the group helps Sette with a job promotion quest, and is now a Summoner able to call upon pets as supporting party members. Despite the easygoing attitude of the group, Nanako mentions the final exams coming up, leading Kyo to announce a temporary suspension of club activities until exams are over. When Hideki questions Ako about her previous test scores which are all below passing, Hideki and the other guild members pull through to help her study within the game, to which everyone passes, including Ako. While an exhausted Ako logs off to rest, Rusian has an honest conversation with Schwein and Master about how to confess to Ako, to which none of them have any real love experience to say much. Nevertheless, they still think of ways for Hideki to confess, and as Hideki and Ako have an afternoon stroll while talking about the upcoming training camp, they have a stop at the park, where their methods are revealed as extremely vague and lackluster. Despite this, Hideki gathers his courage and asks Ako to be his girlfriend, and much to his shock, she declines the proposal. After Kyo and Akane do a comical dance to console Hideki, Akane calls up Ako revealing that her in-game wife mentality was the reason for her decline.
7	"I thought if I went to the beach, I would become a normie?" "Umi ni Ittara Riajū ni Nareru to Omotta?" (Japanese: 海に行ったらリア充になれると思った？)	May 19, 2016
Alley Cats summer vacation training camp has finally started and Kyo has a few surprises to help Ako better understand the real world whilst helping connect her and Hideki's relationship. After enjoying Kyo's private beach and villa for a couple hours, Ms. Saito gets angered that the group isn't using the most of their "youth" and demands they all hangout together for the rest of the day. Night falls and Kyo sets up a special line of fireworks where Hideki then pronounces his love to Ako on the villa steps, but even with Ako accepting and pronouncing hers, she still sees their relationship as husband and wife. To no avail, Kyo sees the vacation as a failure and thus sets up another at Hotel Flores, a hotel that is collaborating with Legendary Age. The group then spends most of the day going on "code quests" that give the player items when they purchase stuff from different areas in the hotel. Around midday Hideki returns to his hotel room and starts up Legendary Age with Ako where she then invites Hideki (Rusian) to her room via the game. As Hideki randomly logs out and logs back in, Ako suggests that they should engage in couples chat, yet something doesn't seem right about the newly logged in Rusian.
8	"I thought I was giving up being a net game husband?" "Netoge no dan'na o Akirameru to Omotta?" (Japanese: ネトゲの旦那を諦めると思った？)	May 26, 2016
Hideki suddenly becomes logged out of his Legendary Age account, and after failing to log back in multiple times, realizes a hacker has taken over his account and is chatting with Ako. Rushing to her room to warn Ako of the impostor posing as Rusian, Hideki takes a look at their couples chat box in which the hacked Rusian made very sexually aggressive advances on her, much to Ako's horror. As she apologizes for briefly mistaking the hacked Rusian for the real one, Kyo and the others drop by to assess the damage done to Hideki's account. Despite regaining access to his account, his character Rusian has been terminated, and while Ako grieves over his disappearance, the group resolves to do what they can to help. While Akane and Kyo scour the game's shops and auction houses for Rusian's sold items, Hideki consults the guild leader Black Magician under a backup character named Peroshiki to help him find his items, to which he agrees to. As Nekohime drums up help from her guild mates, Master and Peroshiki come across a merchant under the name Rontan selling some of Rusian's items at ridiculously high prices. Taking note of Rontan as a prime suspect, members of Nekohime's Elite Guard manage to recover Rusian's wedding ring as a monster drop item, much to Ako's delight. As Hideki and Kyo have a talk at school about how fragile Ako's ties to Hideki are, Kyo assures him that the tone of the chat box brought Ako back to her senses, reinvigorating Hideki. At the guild hub, the Black Magician sends the Alley Cats a URL of a hacking blog under Lon, an experienced hacker and RMTer (Real Money Trader), who recently bragged about Hideki's account hack. Hatching a sinister plot to catch the hacker, the group (excluding Ako) go through hours of unknown activity over the computer. Coming to Hideki's house to check on him, Ako realizes the deletion of Rusian has also annulled their marriage, much to her shock. Putting his plan into motion, Hideki makes an RMT with the hacker who is under the name Shoko, which catches the attention of admin Game Master Nyack. Also accused of hacking Rontan and several other characters, Shoko confronts Peroshiki who gave away his IP address on the trading board Hideki and the others made three days ago, working nonstop to authenticate several years worth of posts. While Peroshiki faces a three-day suspension for an attempted RMT, GM Nyack restores Rusian's character, and he and Ako soon reinstate their marriage.
9	"I thought if we stayed over, we would get along better?" "Otomari shitara Nakayoku nareru to Omotta?" (Japanese: お泊まりしたら仲良くなれると思った？)	June 2, 2016
It's an all-girls slumber party at Kyo's extravagant mansion as they gather to finish their summer break homework, especially Ako who hasn't made any progress with it. Cut off from contact with Hideki as well, the other girls take this as an opportunity for Ako to socialize without having him there, much to her chagrin. As the girls are led by a maid into Kyo's room, Ako struggles to stay focused and gets up for a bathroom trip. Distrusted by the others into believing she'll run away, Nanako walks with her, and the pair soon become caught up exploring the mansion due to Ako's curiosity. Stumbling upon a study with a hidden room behind the bookshelf, they become chased by the maid after discovering a secret book chronicling Kyo's "growth" and the lost pair calls out to the others from the courtyard. While they decide to carry out the remainder of their work from there, Ako's minimal progress draws the attention of a frustrated Akane. After going through dinner and bath time, Nanako asks Ako about Hideki's preferences in girls, to which not even she doesn't know. With cellphone in hand, Ako prepares to contact him as the others realize the troubling situation, where her video chat will leave the girls in full view of their naked bodies. While Ako leads the girls on a chase, Nanako manages to calm the dilemma as Ako throws her the cellphone only for her to turn it off. As the girls get settled in a single bed, Nanako also questions Ako about the views of her wife mentality, where she gives a scenario in how husbands and wives in the game and in real life have certain bonuses. Perceiving Ako as unfaithful, the girls quickly log into Legendary Age to confront Rusian about his views on Ako's mentality.
10	"I thought we would do our best at the culture festival?" "Bunkasai nara Ganbaru to Omotta?" (Japanese: 文化祭なら頑張ると思った？)	June 9, 2016
Nearing the end of summer vacation, Rusian tells Ako another story about a burdened healer he met during solo play, hoping that Ako will see their marriage from a more realistic standpoint. Back at school again, Akane drags Hideki into the halls, lamenting on her sullied reputation as a normal high schooler. Finding no trace of Ako yet, Hideki calls her only to realize that she has been completely oblivious of her first day at school, expecting the group to be playing the game. As the group meets in the club room once again, they are confronted by Ms. Saito in regards to the upcoming culture festival, to which they must present their club contributions to the other students. Taking advantage of Legendary Age's recent Siege Warfare update, a PvP battle among other guilds held once every week, Kyo suggests that their guild should participate in representing Maegasaki High, as victors will have a banner hoisted on top of their castle for the week in commemoration. After some rounds of practice sparring, Kyo finds herself in a bit of trouble after realizing Apricot's mage role is not suited for PvP. Participating in the next siege battle against a guild known as the Cleaning Crew, Alley Cats witnesses another guild storming in only to be demolished in under ten seconds, much to their surprise. After being party wiped twice for their first attempt and an altercation between another guild, Master gets into even more trouble after realizing the prohibited use of premium items in Siege Warfare. Witnessing Nekohime's Elite Guard siege the castle only to lose it moments later, the Alley Cats group mocks Nekohime, much to her chagrin. While Ako gets into some trouble at school after being put in charge of her class' maid cafe, Master enlists some reinforcements in the game in the form of mercenary guild Wallenstein.
11	"I thought we could win by delegating to others?" "Taninmakase de Kateru to Omotta?" (Japanese: 他人任せで勝てると思った？)	June 16, 2016
Master and Wallenstein's leader Bats make a formal alliance to help Alley Cats win their siege battle. Evaluating the guild members one by one, Bats gives Alley Cats a vague strategy rundown assuring that his guild can handle the dirty work, with Akane and Nanako capitalizing on his pretentious attitude. Arriving at Fort Cantor with defending guild Emperor Sword on guard, Bats instructs Ako and Sette to run across opposite sides of the castle, spreading out their stationary guards. As Rusian and Schwein charge the defending line, Alley Cats soon witness Wallenstein's true power as they eliminate the entire defending party with little effort, instructing the others to take cover. Once the carnage begins to clear, Ako and Sette runs inside and regroups with the others, where Fort Cantor becomes captured in the name of Alley Cats. While Wallenstein takes their leave, the group feels unsatisfied with their easy victory feeling somewhat unaccomplished. However, once their moment of reprieve is up, Bats instantly dissolves the alliance and stages a takeover on the castle, single-handedly killing every guild member except for a grief-stricken Ako. While real world Ako procures maid outfits from Kyo's maids for her class' maid cafe, more problems arise as she neglects shift duties and serving manuals a week before the cultural festival, to which Hideki helps her classmates become notified. On the matter of taking revenge on Wallenstein, Hideki forms alliances with Nekohime's Elite Guard as well as the Dark Magician's guild TMW. With only one more siege battle before the culture festival, will their combined efforts be enough to take down Wallenstein?
12	"My net game wife is a girl online!" "Netoge no yome wa on'nanoko nandesu yo!" (Japanese: ネトゲの嫁は女の子なんですよ！)	June 23, 2016
With only one chance to take back Fort Cantor from Wallenstein, Kyo explains her plan to the others of taking and defending the castle until time runs out. Rallying the alliance party composed of members from Nekohime's Elite Guard, Yuyun witnesses the guild Emperor Sword retake Fort Cantor as the alliance party Alley Cat Princess Elite Guard makes their move. Destroying the front gate using the gi, Sette provides a distraction to the first wave of defending guards by taking advantage of the chat window, allowing Schwein to kill them in one fell swoop. Exploiting the opening, the alliance makes quick work of the remaining members before arriving inside and placing the Alley Cats siege crystal. Tasked with defending the castle for 20 minutes, the alliance demolishes Emperor Sword's invading army using a well-executed Meteor spell performed by Master. With 10 minutes remaining, Wallenstein makes their return, quickly eliminating Kyo's stationary line and Rusian's secondary defense. Arriving in the courtyard, Schwein's forces are shot down by their archer, until Schwein teleports in with her finishing move and kills her. Arriving inside the castle, the surprises keep coming as Sette gets herself killed to disable Wallenstein's abilities, and additional forces from Nekohime's guild conduct an ambush on the remaining members, killing their mage and healer. As Rusian stalls out Wallenstein's knight, Bats arrives to Master, the lone defender of the crystal. Despite being the only thing standing in his way, Bats becomes increasingly irritated as his attacks have no effect on her. Calling upon his knight to inflict Master with a stun skill, Ako takes the stun as Bats slices her down. With Rusian stalling the knight and Master still immune to Bats' attacks, the group manages to hold out until Alley Cats is declared the lords of Fort Cantor. Using a Drop of Yggdrasil per hit to nullify all of her damage, Master tells Bats that despite the huge monetary loss, doing it for the sake of her friends is what made it worthwhile. Admitting defeat and giving respects to Alley Cats, Wallenstein gallantly takes their leave. At the culture festival, the Net Game Club shows off their screenshot of their most recent victory, and Ako's maid cafe becomes a big success. During cleanup, Hideki promises Ako an in-game reward for staying strong during the culture festival, and while mere moments away from kissing each other, the rest of group comes in to talk about Legendary Age's Player Housing update. While Hideki tries to clear up the misunderstanding, Ako exclaims her in-game reward is similar to a real life one, to which Hideki shouts that the game and reality are separate, much to her frustration.

== Works cited ==
- "LN" is shortened form for "light novel" and refers to a volume of the And You Thought There Is Never a Girl Online? light novels.
- "Ch." is shortened form for "Chapter" and refers to a chapter number of the And You Thought There Is Never a Girl Online? manga.
- "Ep." is shortened form for "Episode" and refers to an episode number of the And You Thought There Is Never a Girl Online? anime.
