= FareCompare =

Private U.S. company

FareCompare LP
- Type: Private
- Industry: Travel technology Travel services
- Founded: 2001
- Headquarters: Dallas, Texas, United States
- Key people: Rick Seaney, CEO; Graeme Wallace, CTO
- Products: Travel and airfare information
- Services: Airfare Comparison
- Owner: XXI Technologies
- Number of employees: Unknown
- Parent: XXI Technologies
- Website: farecompare.com

FareCompare L.P. is a privately owned company involved in areas including travel advice, planning, and airfare. The company's primary product is an airfare comparison shopping site FareCompare. It also offers online group travel booking services. The company was founded in 2004 and is headquartered in Dallas, Texas.

== History ==
FareCompare was developed out of XXI Technologies, a business which performed technical consulting and data mining for the oil industry and other companies. While working on a project for Hotels.com, the company was introduced to the central airfare databases which the airlines had jointly developed (see Orbitz). The large database, containing up to 160 million new ticket prices daily, had previously been challenging to search in real-time. XXI Technologies came up with new techniques for rapidly processing the volume of data in order to make it searchable.

After Expedia purchased Hotels.com, the work by XXI Technologies was discarded. However, the developers considered the fast processing to be a differentiating feature which might fill a significant market need, so they began operating under a new company name, FareCompare L.P. XXI Technologies became the holding company for the concern and FareCompare.com launched in March 2006. The two principal founders are Rick Seaney, Chief Executive Officer, and Graeme Wallace, Chief Technical Officer.

== Products ==
FareCompare offers users airfare price comparison, as well as hotel and package pricing. It is a meta-search engine that pulls data from a number of sources including major airline companies and IATA data in order to provide real-time search for air flights based primarily upon low pricing. It has been known for leveraging new versions of Java in order to exploit the latest advances in performance improvements.

Other consumer products include Fare Alerts and weekly Fare Deals.

== Research ==
FareCompare applies data mining techniques to airfare information in order to offer its service. Statistical data from the company's historical price index is also used by financial analysts to assess and predict airline industry stock prices.

== Controversy ==
Directly after launch, FareCompare attracted disfavor from major airlines for communicating the pricing details their analyses uncovered in airfares, such as the dates consumers should book travel in order to avoid higher pricing, along with other high price avoidance tactics. The company data has been used in news reports and programs about travel tips.
