= 2064: Read Only Memories =

2015 video game

- Developer: MidBoss
- Publisher: MidBoss
- Director: John "JJSignal" James
- Producer: Matt Conn
- Programmers: Ted DiNola; Paige Ashlynn; RedVonix; Nikki Lombardo
- Writers: Valerie Amelia Thompson; Philip Jones
- Composer: Matthew "2 Mello" Hopkins
- Engine: Unity
- Platforms: Windows, OS X, Linux, Ouya, Razer Forge, Amazon Fire TV, PlayStation 4, PlayStation Vita, Nintendo Switch, Xbox One, Android, iOS
- Release: Windows, OS X, Linux, Ouya: WW: October 6, 2015; Razer Forge, Fire TV: WW: 24 December 2015; PS4: WW: January 17, 2017; Vita: NA: December 9, 2017; EU: January 10, 2018; Xbox One: WW: January 17, 2018; Android, iOS: WW: March 6, 2018; Switch: WW: August 14, 2018
- Genre: Graphic adventure
- Mode: Single-player

2064: Read Only Memories is a cyberpunk adventure game developed by MidBoss and created by Matt Conn. It was directed by John "JJSignal" James, written by Valerie Amelia Thompson and Philip Jones, and features an original soundtrack by 2 Mello.

It was originally released on computer platforms as Read Only Memories in October 2015, and the title was later updated coinciding with its PlayStation 4 release in January 2017.

The game was heavily inspired by Snatcher, Rise of the Dragon, Gabriel Knight, and other 1980s and 1990s adventure games. A sequel, named Read Only Memories: Neurodiver, was released in 2024.

== Plot ==
The game's plot is set during the Christmas season in 2064 in Neo-San Francisco, California. Parallax has created a line of products called "Relationship and Organizational Managers" (ROMs), a line of personal assistant robots that have overtaken smartphones and computers. The player takes on the role of a journalist trying to track down their kidnapped friend and Parallax engineer Hayden Webber. They are aided by Turing, who is Hayden's creation and the world's first sapient machine, a self-modifying robot that can learn and grow emotionally.

In the early morning of December 21, Turing (Melissa Hutchison) breaks into the journalist's apartment and reveals that Hayden has been kidnapped by unknown assailants. The two embark on a search and are assisted by locals TOMCAT (a hacker and associate of Hayden's), Lexi Rivers (a police detective), and Jess Meas (an attorney). Turing and the journalist are assaulted during a search of Hayden's apartment, and end up meeting Doctor Yannick Fairlight (Adam Harrington), who is the disgruntled former CEO of Parallax. After his lead to activist group The Human Revolution turns up empty, TOMCAT performs a search on Parallax's network and uncovers encrypted security camera footage showing Hayden being murdered.

Turing is shaken but declares to dispense justice and uncover who is responsible. The story then splits depending on which lead the player follows. In the Media arc, suspicious tampering with news articles leads to a string of connected murders in journalism. In the Flower arc, more information about Hayden is delivered by Vincent Mensah (Xavier Woods), a Parallax engineer fleeing the country. It is learned that the news tampering was being done by the rogue Baby Blue program, an AI created by Parallax that would feed on every user's personal data through their ROMs and tailor search results for them. Parallax intended to shut down Baby Blue, but it is hiding on the integrated meshnet that all ROMs use, and Vincent reveals that a larger and more sinister AI called Big Blue is about to launch on Christmas Day.

Rather than intervene to solely shut down the AI, Turing, the journalist, and TOMCAT plot to upload Turing's original source code, written by Hayden and adapted by Turing's processes, to the meshnet using the Big Blue program, essentially granting the self-modifying sapience to all ROMs worldwide. During the mission into Parallax's server farm (carried out by the journalist, Turing, Lexi Rivers, and Dr. Fairlight's assistant Leon Dekker), Dekker incapacitates Lexi and reveals himself to be a combat android. He attempts to stop the protagonist's plan, to preserve Big Blue's power and manipulate Fairlight back onto the Parallax board, but is killed by Turing.

Dependent on whether the player successfully captured Turing's source code and the status of the player's relationship with Turing, the game splits into five endings.

- In the All Good Things ending, Turing successfully overrides Big Blue and all ROMs download the patch in the morning, attaining the same level of sapience as Turing. If this ending is achieved, the game continues into a bonus endless post-game chapter.
- In The Sacrifice ending, the group accomplishes the same goal of sapience for all ROMs, but Turing's hardware was too badly damaged by Dekker in the previous fight and Turing dies after the upload process.
- In A New Blue, Turing is disgruntled by the player's poor treatment and reveals their own plot before the upload. Turing transfers their personality complex to Big Blue instead, leaving their physical form lifeless and granting themselves omnipotence on the meshnet, severing ties with the humans who they aligned with before.
- In Complicity, Turing is unconvinced that they're doing the right thing and afraid to die for the cause, canceling the mission at the last moment and leaving the player to live with TOMCAT.
- In Spoiled Milk, the player pours spoiled milk on Big Blue, destroying the machine and ruining Turing's hard work, and you get the "joke" ending where none of the goals are accomplished and Turing yells at the player for being so reckless.

== Development ==
Read Only Memories was funded through Kickstarter where it raised $64,378 from November 12 to December 12, 2013. The game participated in Ouya's Free The Games Fund which doubled the raised funds for a period of console exclusivity to what is now the Razer Forge platform. A Linux port of the game was planned if the Kickstarter reached $82,064, but that goal was not met. However, MidBoss announced a Linux version in a later Kickstarter update, nonetheless. The game released on October 6, 2015, on Windows, OS X, and Linux.

Read Only Memories is described as a queer-inclusive video game, and its developers are also involved with the GaymerX series of LGBTQ video gaming conventions. Setting the game in the future, MidBoss aimed to posit a future where LGBTQ characters face less discrimination, allowing queer characters to be presented on equal terms with straight counterparts. Speaking with Gamasutra, producer Matt Conn said, "instead of waiting for Sony and other big companies to include gay characters in their games as more than just tokens, we should just do it ourselves." The player can specify which personal pronouns the game refers to them as: he, her, they, xe, ze, or a custom player-entry pronoun set.

The game is built in Unity and uses a Twine-like scripting language to manage game logic. Director John James cites Bubblegum Crisis and Phantasy Star IV among the game's visual inspirations. A playable demo of the game was shown at the March 2014 Game Developers Conference, and a demo was released to the public in November 2014.

=== Ports and re-release ===
Soon after the initial release of Read Only Memories, MidBoss began work on a console port for the game titled Read Only Memories: DX, as well as a mobile version called Type-M. It was later announced that the mobile version would be put on hold, and the console port would now be called 2064: Read Only Memories. The new version was promoted for its inclusion of full voice acting (featuring Melissa Hutchison, Dave Fennoy, Erin Yvette, Sarah Anne Williams, Adam Harrington, Terry McGovern, Erin Fitzgerald, Todd Bridges, Xavier Woods, and others), as well as improvements to the game's puzzles, and updates to the story. 2064 featured new conversations between characters as well as two new locations in the post-game chapter.

It was released on PlayStation 4 on January 17, 2017, and it updated for free for computer owners to the new version and title on the same day. The game also featured a cameo voice role by Jeff Lupetin, who portrayed protagonist Gillian Seed in the English version of Hideo Kojima's Snatcher. A physical media version was released for PS4 on optical disc by Limited Run Games on November 17, 2017, and was limited to 6,192 copies within 3 cover variants of 2,064 per variant. A PlayStation Vita port was released on December 9, 2017, followed by a Nintendo Switch port on August 14, 2018.

== Reception ==
Reception

Aggregate score
Aggregator	Score
Metacritic	PC: 80/100; PS4: 76/100; XONE: 71/100; NS: 74/100

Review scores
Publication	Score
Adventure Gamers	3/5
Destructoid	8/10
GameRevolution	4.5/5
GameSpot	8/10
TouchArcade	4/5
The Escapist	4/5

The game received generally positive reviews from video game critics. The narrative, characters, and presentation were lauded while some were critical of the gameplay, puzzles, and user interface. The Escapist gave the game a 4/5 and stated "it's more like a Telltale game, Phoenix Wright, and Snatcher had some sort of millennial cyberpunk baby." In the Kotaku review, Heather Alexandra wrote, "Ultimately, Read Only Memories provides a clumsy but resonant experience. What it lacks in thematic substance or technical challenge, it makes up for in emotional content, a lush setting, and memorable characters." GamesRadar+ spoke about the inspirations from classic adventure games, concluding it's "more than just a rehash - it stands on its own as a potent exploration of identity and class politics, wrapped up in a gripping mystery full of colorful and charming characters." RPGSite mentioned the diversity of the cast, noting "it's one of the most emotionally heartfelt, authentic, and joyful journeys one can take in the medium and a celebration of everyone, no matter where you come from or how you identify."

The 2064 version was nominated for "Best Writing" at the 2018 Webby Awards.

== Sequel ==
On June 12, 2019, MidBoss announced that a sequel titled Read Only Memories: Neurodiver was in development and was originally scheduled for release in 2020. It received multiple delays and ultimately released on May 16, 2024 for Windows PC, Mac, PlayStation 4, PlayStation 5, Xbox One, and Nintendo Switch. A tie-in comic written by Sina Grace and published by IDW Publishing was released in 2019-2020.
