= Matt Conn =

Founder and former CEO of MidBoss

- Born: October 30, 1987 (age 39); San Francisco, California

Matt Conn (born 1987 in San Francisco, California) is the founder and former CEO of MidBoss. He is known for the creation of GaymerX, the cyberpunk story adventure game Read Only Memories, and producing the LGBTQ video game documentary Gaming In Color.

He is also a founding member at BandPage, which was acquired by YouTube in 2016 and for winning the Travel Channel television program America's Worst Driver.

On March 26, 2018, Conn stepped down from the board of GaymerX and as CEO of MidBoss after allegations of sexual misconduct, underpaying workers, and workplace harassment.

== GaymerX ==
GaymerX (initially GaymerCon) was founded in February 2012 and launched its Kickstarter on August 1, 2012 with a goal of $25,000. It hit its goal within five days and ended up raising just over $91,000. The first convention was held on August 3 and 4, 2013 in San Francisco, California. The launch was covered by sites such as Examiner and GamePolitics.com.

Throughout the fundraising campaign, organizers added new support levels, in addition to existing support levels that included admission to the event and voice acting from Ellen McLain. At a session during the convention, McLain took part as assistant on a marriage proposal to help an attendee propose to his boyfriend by voicing a version of the song "Still Alive" with reworked lyrics.

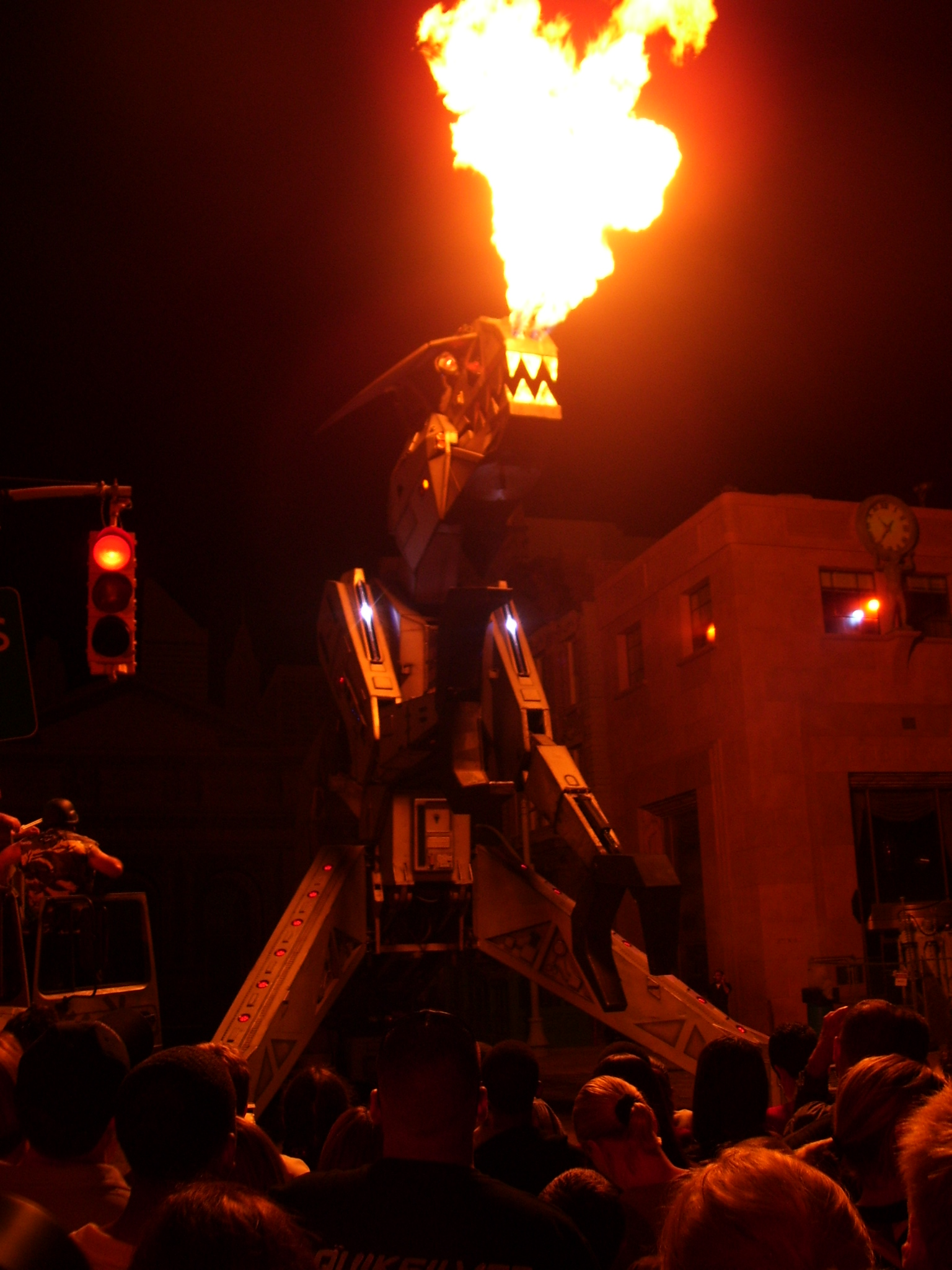
Robosaurus, featured on America's Worst Driver

GaymerX2 was held at the InterContinental Hotel on July 11–13, 2014 in downtown San Francisco. It featured celebrities like former WWE performer Fred Rosser (Darren Young) and sponsors like Indiecade, Ubisoft, Riot Games, and 2K Games.

GaymerX ran from 2013 until 2017 and has held events in San Francisco, San Jose, and New York City. It also inspired a spin-off event, GX Australia, in Sydney, Australia.

== 2064: Read Only Memories ==
2064: Read Only Memories is a cyberpunk adventure game for the PC, Mac, PlayStation 4, PlayStation Vita, Xbox One and Linux. It was successfully funded on Kickstarter for $64,378 on December 12, 2013.

== America's Worst Driver ==
On this series, which aired in mid-2010, Conn was penalized for being the worst driver in San Francisco by having his car destroyed by construction equipment. In the finale, Conn was named the winner of the program, and had a car representing him destroyed by Robosaurus.
