= Pridefest (video game) =

2016 video game

- Pridefest logo
- Developer: Mad Marshmallow
- Publishers: Atari; LGBT Media
- Platforms: iOS, Android
- Release: January 27, 2016
- Genre: Social simulation
- Modes: Single-player, Multiplayer

Pridefest is a social simulation game developed by Mad Marshmallow and published by Atari for iOS and Android. Atari announced the game on July 17, 2014, shortly after the company sponsored and participated in GaymerX2. The game was released on January 27, 2016. The game generated controversy over perceived insensitive handling of its subject matter, which led Atari to sell the game's rights to LGBT Media.

== Gameplay ==
Players can launch and manage an LGBT pride parade in a city of their choosing. They can customize parade floats by selecting size, components, mascots, and decorations, as well as surrounding structures and side attractions, which factor into a city happiness metric. Players complete quests or challenge goals to unlock new parades, earn festival supplies, or secure bonuses. Social elements of the game include avatar customization, chatting with friends, and the ability to bring one player's parade to a friend's city or join a friend's parade.

== Development ==
This was Atari's first LGBT-themed video game, and their second major outreach to the LGBT gaming community after sponsoring and participating in GaymerX2. The company formed an advisory board including members of the LGBT gamer community to help avoid stereotypes and "to develop an engaging and fun game that is inclusive to all gamers".

Atari did not plan to include political aspects of LGBT pride parades in the game. According to the company, "Pridefest will be a fun, social game first and foremost. We do not have a political component in the game."
