= Gayme =

Gayme may refer to:

- Gayme Magazine, a NAMBLA magazine
- Gayme Show, an American television series
- Gaymes, a nickname for the Gay Games
- LGBTQ themes in video games
- Dennice Gayme, American mechanical engineer
- Maui Gayme (born 1983), Chilean alpine skier
- Mikael Gayme (born 1979), Chilean alpine skier

== See also ==
- R v Gayme, a Supreme Court of Canada case
- Gaymer (disambiguation)
- Gayming Magazine, a British LGBTQ online video game magazine
