= Read Only Memories: Neurodiver =

2024 video game

- Developer: MidBoss
- Publisher: Chorus Worldwide
- Director: John James
- Producer: Via Pruitt
- Programmer: Sergio Kossio
- Artist: John James
- Composer: Ken Snyder
- Platforms: Linux; macOS; Nintendo Switch; PlayStation 4; PlayStation 5; Windows; Xbox One; Xbox Series X/S
- Release: WW: May 16, 2024
- Genres: Adventure, visual novel
- Mode: Single-player

Read Only Memories: Neurodiver is a 2024 visual novel developed by MidBoss and published by Chorus Worldwide. It is the sequel to 2064: Read Only Memories. Players control a person with extrasensory perception in a cyberpunk story with adventure game elements.

== Gameplay ==
Players control a psychic detective named Luna who can use a creature called a neurodiver to experience someone's memories. Players investigate a fellow psychic who has been causing damage to people's memories. Players mostly read text, as in visual novels, though there are some adventure game elements where players must solve puzzles. It uses retro-style pixel art.

== Development ==
Developer MidBoss is based in Berkeley, California. Chorus Worldwide released Read Only Memories: Neurodiver for Linux, macOS, Windows, PlayStation 4 and 5, Xbox One and Series X/S, and Switch on May 16, 2024.

== Reception ==
On the review aggregation website Metacritic, Read Only Memories: Neurodiver received positive reviews for Windows and Switch, but the PlayStation 5 and Xbox Series X/S versions received mixed reviews. Fellow review aggregator OpenCritic assessed that the game received fair approval, being recommended by 59% of critics. In Japan, four critics from Famitsu gave the game a total score of 30 out of 40. Rock Paper Shotgun called it stylish and occasionally endearing, but the reviewer became exhausted with all the pop culture references and metahumor. Slant Magazine felt that it failed to live up to the promise of its Scanners-style premise. RPGFan said they enjoyed Neurodiver but felt conflicted because the story was so short that it left them feeling unsatisfied. Shacknews praised the world and characters but criticized the writing for being simple. Digitally Downloaded called it "a phenomenal psychic mystery game" and said it can be enjoyed on a breezy or a deeper philosophical level.
