= Pride Fest =

Pride Fest may refer to:

- PrideFest (Denver)
- PrideFest (Milwaukee)
- PrideFest (St. Louis)
- Pridefest (video game)

== See also ==
- Pride parade
