= Night Slave =

1996 video game

- Title screen
- Developer: Melody
- Publisher: Melody
- Platform: NEC PC-9821
- Release: JP: March 8, 1996
- Genre: Run and gun
- Mode: Single-player

Night Slave (ナイト・スレイブ) is a 1996 eroge run and gun video game developed and published by Melody for the NEC PC-9821. The game's design and gameplay draws inspiration from the Assault Suits series, particularly Assault Suits Valken (1992), as well as the Gradius series. It employs many action role-playing game elements such as permanently levelling up the mecha and various weapons using power-orbs obtained from defeating enemies as well as storyline cutscenes, which occasionally contain lesbian adult content. The game's armaments system also employs recoil physics, while the gameplay is varied, including environments such as rainy jungles, snowy wastes, and alien bases.
