= Jaime Woo =

Canadian writer and game developer

- Occupation: Writer
- Writing career
- Period: 2000s-present
- Notable work: Meet Grindr

Jaime Woo is a Canadian writer and game developer. He is best known for his 2013 book Meet Grindr: How One App Changed the Way We Connect, an exploration of the impact of Grindr on social interaction in the gay male community which was a shortlisted nominee for the Lambda Literary Award for non-fiction at the 26th Lambda Literary Awards.

Woo was a cofounder of the Toronto-area video game convention Gamercamp, created the For All Gamers Sake archive of LGBT-themed indie video games, and was a speaker at the 2014 edition of GaymerX.

He has also contributed to publications including Hazlitt, the Financial Post, The Globe and Mail, The Daily Dot, Huffington Post and The Grid.
