= MidBoss =

Game development company

MidBoss LLC
- Industry: Video games
- Founded: August 2, 2012
- Founder: Matt Conn
- Headquarters: San Francisco, California, U.S.
- Area served: Global
- Key people: Cade Peterson (CEO)
- Products: Kitsune Tails
- Website: MidBoss.com

MidBoss is an American video game and media production company that was founded by members of the GaymerX team as they expanded beyond GaymerX into other ventures, specifically Gaming in Color and 2064: Read Only Memories.

On March 26, 2018, Matt Conn stepped down as CEO of MidBoss after allegations of sexual abuse, underpaying workers, and workplace harassment. Cade Peterson was tapped as the new CEO in April 2018.

== 2064: Read Only Memories ==
2064: Read Only Memories is a cyberpunk adventure game, released for Microsoft Windows, macOS, SteamOS, Linux and Ouya on October 6, 2015, and on PlayStation 4 on January 17, 2017. It was successfully funded for $64,378, via Kickstarter on December 12, 2013.

== Gaming in Color ==
Gaming in Color is a documentary film that focuses on queer gamers and industry workers, and the movement to include LGBTQ characters and themes in video game narratives. This project also received funding through a Kickstarter campaign in May 2013, and was distributed by Devolver Digital into wide release on major platforms on May 19, 2015.

== GaymerX ==
MidBoss was the governing body that ran the first three years of GaymerX, an LGBTQ-oriented gaming and geek culture, or gaymer, convention, with panels primarily focused on LGBTQ issues and debates in the gaming industry, founded by Matt Conn, before they became a 501c3 non-profit in late 2015. It was founded in February 2012 and launched its Kickstarter on August 2, 2012 with a goal of $25,000. It hit its goal within 5 days and ended up raising just over $91,000. The first convention happened on August 3 and 4, 2013 in San Francisco, California.
