= Real-time web =

Type of network web

The real-time web is a network web using technologies and practices that enable users to receive information as soon as it is published by its authors, rather than requiring that they or their software check a source periodically for updates.

== History ==
Examples of real-time web are Facebook's newsfeed, and Twitter, implemented in social networking, search, and news sites. Benefits are said to include increased user engagement ("flow") and decreased server loads. In December 2009 real-time search facilities were added to Google Search.

The absolutely first realtime web implementation worldwide have been the WIMS true-realtime server and its web apps in 2001-2011 (WIMS = Web Interactive Management System); based on the True-RealTime Web (WEB-r) model of above; built in WIMS++ (server built in Java) (serverside) and Adobe Flash (ex Macromedia Flash) (clientside). The true-realtime web model was born in 2000 at mc2labs.net by an Italian independent researcher.

== Real-time search ==
A problem created by the rapid pace and huge volume of information created by real-time web technologies and practices is finding relevant information. One approach, known as real-time search, is the concept of searching for and finding information online as it is produced. Advancements in web search technology coupled with growing use of social media enable online activities to be queried as they occur. A traditional web search crawls and indexes web pages periodically, returning results based on relevance to the search query. Google Real-Time Search was available in Google Search until July 2011.

== See also ==
- Comet
- Collaborative real-time editor
- Firebase
- Internet of Things (IoT)
- Meteor
- Microblogging
- Mojolicious
- Node.js
- Prospective search
- PubNub
- Push Technology
- Vert.x
