= Kitsune Tails =

2024 video game

- Steam cover art
- Developer: Kitsune Games
- Publishers: Kitsune Games, MidBoss
- Director: Eniko Fox
- Designer: Elizabeth Dumler
- Artists: Allison Shabet; Wayne Kubiak
- Writer: James Yarrow
- Composers: Jorge Saldías; Manuela Malasaña
- Platforms: Microsoft Windows; Linux; Nintendo Switch; Xbox One; Xbox Series X; PlayStation 4; PlayStation 5
- Release: PC: August 1, 2024
- Genre: Platformer
- Mode: Single-player

Kitsune Tails is a 2024 platform game developed by Kitsune Games and published by MidBoss. Set as the follow up to Super Bernie World, Kitsune Tails controls a young female kitsune, Yuzu, one of Inari's messengers.

== Gameplay ==
Yuzu carrying a lantern

Kitsune Tails is a 2D retro-style platformer featuring power-ups in the form of outfits, often stated as being very close to the gameplay of Super Mario Bros. 3. The game takes place across five different worlds themed after Japanese mythology with different levels included in each world, such as haunted house levels. Cutscenes play after certain levels and the seasons change as the player progresses. The player can also collect coins throughout the levels and minigames to buy powerups in shops. Kitsune Tails features modding tools such as ability to make custom levels and minigames.

== Story ==
Kitsune Tails follows the story of Yuzu, a Kitsune on her first mission as messenger of the goddess Inari. On this journey she encounters healer Akko, who begins to develop feelings for her. However, Yuzu's childhood friend Kiri grows jealous of Akko and tricks her into leaving during a festival, resulting in her capture and imprisonment. Yuzu sets off to pursue Kiri to find out what happened and free Akko.

== Development and release ==
Developer Kitsune Games is based in Cyprus. Kitsune Tails was originally announced around January 2021. A preview build was released to some reviewers in July 2023. Kitsune Tails released on PC via Steam and itch.io on August 1, 2024. The release for other platforms is yet to be announced but is planned.

== Reception ==
The 2023 preview build was given positive reviews by Screen Rant and PCMag, with both outlets praising the game's characters, love story, and "cozy" nature. Kotaku praised the narrative, stating that "it's a cute story to watch unfold and the promise of seeing a new cutscene gave me motivation to beat every level I could," although noting the controls felt floaty at times, and PCGamesN stated that "the PC finally has its very own answer to Super Mario Bros. 3." Siliconera also reviewed the game positively, stating "Kitsune Tails is a challenging and precise platforming game featuring an adorable queer story about friendship and love." Boss Rush Network gave the game a 3.5/5, stating it is overall a "fine game" but criticizing the "lackluster dialogue and voice acting."

=== Awards ===
The Melbourne Queer Games Festival awarded Kitsune Tails with the 2024 silver medal. It also won "Best LGBTQ+ Indie Game Award" at the 2025 Gayming Awards.
