= Butterfly Soup 2 =

2022 video game

- Developer: Brianna Lei
- Engine: Ren'Py
- Platforms: Windows; macOS; Linux
- Release: October 29, 2022
- Genre: Visual novel
- Mode: Single-player

Butterfly Soup 2 is a visual novel developed by Brianna Lei and published in October 2022 for Windows, macOS, and Linux. It is the sequel to the 2017 Butterfly Soup, and begins shortly after the conclusion of the first game. It has the player follow the perspectives of four LGBT Asian-American girls in Fremont, California, alternating between their first year of high school in 2009 and when they were young children. The coming-of-age story centers on the romance between Akarsha and her friend Noelle, their struggles with their parents' expectations and influence, and their experiences as second-generation immigrants.

Lei developed the game over the five years after the original, beginning with plotlines and elements that she had cut from the first game. She wanted to focus on a less straightforward relationship than in Butterfly Soup, as well as relating the characters to her personal experience as an LGBT, second-generation Asian-American. Critics praised the game's story and writing, especially for its exploration of its themes and nuanced characterization. It was nominated for the Excellence in Narrative award at the 2023 Independent Games Festival, and for the "Best LGBTQ Indie Game" of 2022 by Gayming Magazine.

== Gameplay ==
Butterfly Soup 2 is a visual novel, wherein the player advances through scenes with static two-dimensional images of characters. Its gameplay follows the same template as the original Butterfly Soup. The player's primary interaction with the game is selecting dialogue options and deciding the order of actions. The game is mostly linear, with the exception of scenes where the player can select the next location or object to engage with. Unlike many visual novels, Butterfly Soup 2 does not feature a branching narrative; the player's choices can impact the wording of individual scenes but do not change the overall story. The game's plot alternates its focus between four major protagonists, with the player taking the role of the four different viewpoint characters from a first-person perspective.

== Plot ==
Akarsha in conversation with Noelle

The game is set in Fremont, California, in 2009. The plot of Butterfly Soup 2 starts a few months after the first game ended. It follows four LGBT Asian-American girls as they attend their first year of high school and bond as members of a baseball club. The four protagonists are the strong and shy Indian-American Diya, the short and aggressive Korean-American Min-Seo, the quirky and energetic Indian-American Akarsha, and the smart and dedicated Chinese-American Noelle. Additional characters include Min's twin brother Jun-Seo and baseball captains Chryssa and Liz.

The narrative focuses on each of the four girls in turn, alternating between the present day and when they were younger. It opens with Akarsha in 2009, at a surprise party for Noelle's birthday. Diya and Min, who began a relationship at the end of the previous game, are shown to be very affectionate with each other. However, Akarsha plays pranks on Noelle, leading Noelle to yell at her. After meeting Akarsha's parents, Noelle says that Akarsha uses humor to avoid being seen trying something and failing. Akarsha privately agrees; she has a crush on Noelle, and thinks she may like her back due to understanding her so well. When Noelle doesn't respond to Akarsha's text asking for a date, Akarsha pretends this was a joke by her brother and continues to play pranks on Noelle.

Diya's chapter begins as a flashback to the third grade, when she is picked up by her mother from school; while they talk, her mother tells her to stay away from Min because she is a "freak" for not looking feminine. In 2009, Diya is once again picked up from school, but she is much less talkative around her mother and hides that she is dating Min. Diya thinks to herself that she is scared of her mother's reactions, particularly if she says something that disagrees with her mother's culture from India. Min's section begins in the fourth grade, where she argues with her racist classmates. Soon after, she rides home with her father, who experiences road rage while shouting at her to stop reacting outwardly to racism. Min notes that he seems to instead take his anger out on his children. In the present day, the baseball club is making a film project for class. When Min is unintentionally racist to Ester, a half-Black, half-Chinese girl, this leads to an argument between the two girls. Min talks about it with Diya and Noelle, and realizes that she is upset and disinclined to apologize because she experiences unapologetic racism from many people. The three discuss how much it is possible to change their beliefs from what they are taught as children.

In Noelle's section, she is shown being bad at Chinese language classes in fifth grade. Her parents insist that she continue classes to avoid embarrassing them to their family friends, but ultimately allow her to quit to not waste money. In the present day, they travel to Taiwan to see their family. Noelle likes the country, but finds that she cannot communicate with her family as they do not speak English and has no relationship with them as she has never met them before. She does not know much about the culture or her parents' history, and cannot pretend to be Taiwanese like her parents want her to be. At school, Akarsha is hurt at a baseball game, and after crying over her, Noelle realizes over the next week that she has a crush on her. At a school multicultural fair, Akarsha and Noelle realize that their romantic style is less overt than Diya and Min's. Akarsha admits that she sent the texts asking out Noelle, though Noelle doesn't remember them. The game ends with the four deciding that they cannot be exactly what their parents want them to be, but that they can be happy regardless. In an after-credits scene, adult Akarsha and Noelle lose the key to their sex handcuffs, forcing them to go to the fire department with Akarsha half-dressed, as the two flirt antagonistically with each other.

== Development ==
Butterfly Soup 2 was developed by Brianna Lei between 2017 and its release in October 2022. After finishing Butterfly Soup in September 2017, Lei planned to create a sequel that would include the parts of the game that were cut from the original design. The first draft of the original game had been intended to be much longer than the final result, covering the characters' entire freshman year. Lei decided early on in development, however, that the game was too long for her background in creating short stories and games, and ended it halfway through the school year. When Butterfly Soup was released, Lei had a 141-page document of cut and unused ideas. She announced plans to work on the sequel in late 2017, and in February 2018 she suggested the game might be completed by the following summer, while also warning that development could take longer.

With Butterfly Soup 2, Lei wanted to explore Noelle and Akarsha's relationship, as well as the experience of being a second-generation immigrant. Akarsha and Noelle's dynamic was based on her experience with school-age crushes, with several of Akarsha's attempts at attracting Noelle drawn from her own as a child. Akarsha's attempt to ask out Noelle over text and then blame her brother was inspired by a friend having done the same to Lei, using some of the actual wording from those real-life chat messages. Lei additionally wanted the start of a relationship that was less straightforward than Diya and Min's from the first game, with the two people not being interested in each other at the same time. She has explained that Diya and Min do not recognize that Akarsha or Noelle like each other romantically until the end of the game because they "would never ever treat each other the way Noelle and Akarsha do". Lei was hesitant about adding the after-credits scene due to its implied sexual nature, but decided to include it to avoid "doing the same thing as Noelle's mom" by not treating sex as "just a normal part of life".

Lei explored her experience as a second-generation immigrant, finding a great deal of commonality between her life as Chinese-American and that of other second-generation immigrant friends. Although each of the four main characters has a different relationship with their parents and their ancestral cultures, she found similarities in how children from different cultures were alienated from both their birth and historical cultures, as well as how that strained their relationships. Noelle's story became the heart of this concept, as a journey of self-discovery outside of parental and cultural expectations. Lei used Noelle's story to show the tension between rejecting Noelle's parents' expectations and losing her connection to her Taiwanese culture and family, and that she was inversely rejecting her own homosexuality because of her parents' expectations, and regretting that as well. Lei originally planned for Noelle's attempt to translate her mother's poem in Taiwan to be successful, but after two months of trying and failing to learn Mandarin, she felt that it would be "insincere" to give that plotline a happy ending.

Lei found it cathartic to write a story about the characters finding happiness regardless of the similar issues from her own life. She has said that there is not much media about the experience of being a "queer Asian American girl", and she wanted to write a story that would have been helpful for understanding her situation growing up. Diya was the most difficult character to write, as her general quietness could make writing her conversations "like pulling teeth". Some of the baseball elements were inspired by the documentary The History of the Seattle Mariners. The monologue at the end of the game was inspired by the lyrics of the song "You! Me! Dancing!", while the quote used in it—"Out of the crooked timber of humanity, no straight thing was ever made"—was taken from No Straight Thing Was Ever Made by Urvashi Bahuguna; the dual meaning of "straight" was based on Lei's own original misinterpretation of the meaning in the title.

Lei released the game on itch.io on October 29, 2022. It was originally released in English for Windows, macOS, and Linux, with fan-made translations to several other languages added later. It also has unofficial web browser and Android ports. Lei allowed players to purchase the game for any price. Although she has ideas for a third game in the series, she intends to make other games before returning to it.

== Reception ==
Butterfly Soup 2 was nominated for the Excellence in Narrative award at the 2023 Independent Games Festival, the same award the original game was nominated for at the 2018 festival. It was nominated for the "Best LGBTQ Indie Game" of 2022 by Gayming Magazine. Digital Spy listed it as one of the best games of 2022, Kotaku described it as one of the "most heartfelt" and "funniest" games of the year, and TheGamer said it had one of the best romance stories in video games.

Critics were very positive towards the game, focusing primarily on the story and its complex characters and themes. Rock Paper Shotgun's review said that the game was deeper and more nuanced than its prequel, and Jess Lee of Digital Spy called it "just as good and perhaps more confidently written". Khee Hoon Chan of Gayming Magazine praised the writing, particularly the interactions between the different personalities of the characters and the game's exploration of issues around race, heritage, and sexuality. Liv Ngan of Eurogamer applauded the "authentic and impactful representation" of Asian and Asian-American characters. Carolyn Petit of Kotaku also greatly liked the writing and the multi-dimensional characters.

Jay Castello of Rock Paper Shotgun and Jade King of TheGamer both applauded the characterization and the game's willingness to sympathetically explore the flaws and strengths of the four main characters. Andrew King of TheGamer appreciated that Diya and Min's relationship was still interesting while also being stable instead of using tropes around relationship drama. The Kotaku reviewer also positively noted the art style, which she felt made the situations feel both real and universal. Kotaku's reviewer felt that the relationship between Akarsha and Noelle was less believable than Diya and Min's from the first game and the overall conclusion more happy than realistic. They concluded, however, that "these feel like nitpicks in the face of how moving, funny, observant, and nourishing so much of Butterfly Soup 2 is."
