= Colleen Macklin =

American game designer

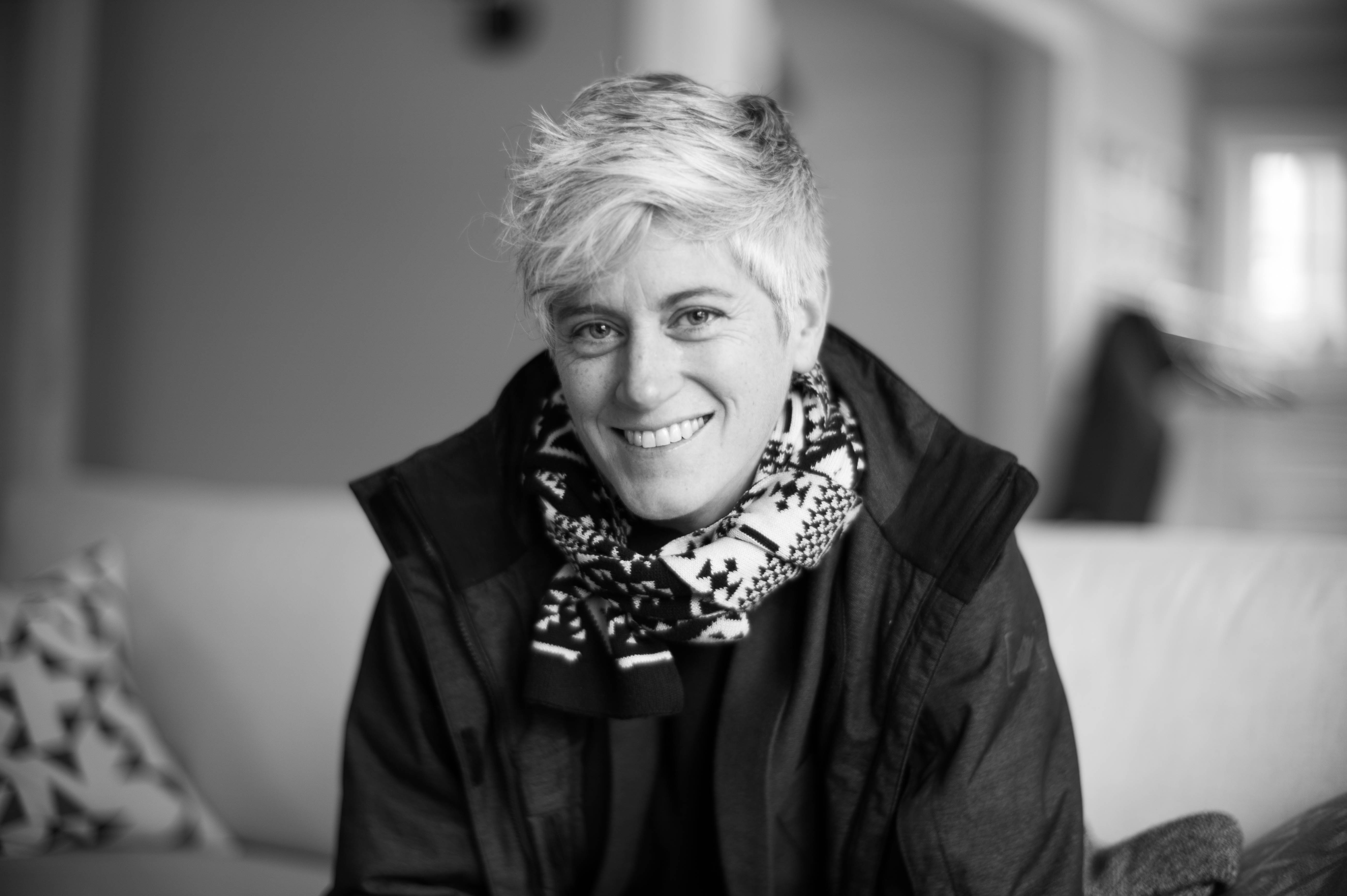
- Colleen Macklin, 2014
- Occupations: Video game designer Professor
- Years active: 1993 - Present
- Notable work: PETLab
- Website: https://www.colleenmacklin.com/

Colleen Macklin is an American game designer, an associate professor of media design at Parsons The New School for Design and founder and co-director of PETLab (Prototyping Education and Technology Lab) which focuses on games for experimental learning and social engagement.

== Education ==
She has a BFA in Media Arts from Pratt Institute and has done graduate studies in computer science at City University of New York and in international affairs at The New School.

== Career ==
On July 26, 2012, the White House Office of Science and Technology Policy launched an Academic Consortium on Games for Impact. Macklin was one of 16 academics invited to join the invitation-only group.

PETLab, the research group Macklin founded and co-directs, is known for encouraging "creative approaches to, and deeper, dynamic understandings of, the complex issues society faces today, such as climate change, wealth and resource distribution, and media literacy." The project also aims to get games to teach the player by allowing them to reflect on not only what the game is about but also how it's structured.

She was part of game design group Local No. 12 who made games like Dear Reader, an online word puzzle game, and The Metagame, a board/card game .

In 2011, she was a visiting scholar at University of California, Los Angeles's Art | Sci Center + Lab.

Macklin also speaks about "what it means to be a woman in games" as well as speaking on the topic of gay gamers. In 2014, Macklin appeared in the LGBTQ video games documentary film Gaming In Color.

== Books ==
- Iterate: Ten Lessons in Design and Failure (2019)
- Games, Design and Play: A Detailed Approach to Iterative Game Design (2016)
- Games, Learning, and Society: Learning and Meaning in the Digital Age; Chapter 22 (2012)

== Movies ==
- Gaming in Color (May 19, 2015)
- Gameloading: Rise of the Indies (April 21, 2015)

== Selected talks and exhibitions ==
- "#1ReasonToBe panel" (March 2014), Game Developers Conference, San Francisco, California, United States
- "Media Lab Conversations Series: Colleen Macklin" (January 30, 2014), MIT Media Lab, Cambridge, Massachusetts, United States
- "We're Here..." (October 26, 2013), QGCon: The Queerness and Games Conference, Berkeley Center for New Media, Berkeley, California
- "Keynote Speaker" (November 2012), 2012 National Council of Arts Administrators Conference, Columbus, Ohio, United States
- "Blur 02: Power at Play in Digital Art and Culture" (2002), New York City, New York, United States
