= BandPage =

Music startup based in San Francisco, California

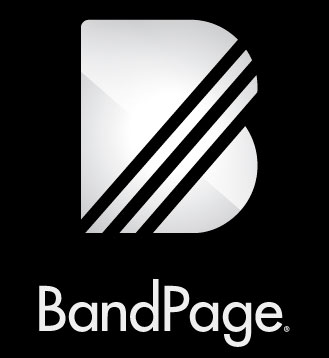
- Website type: Tools & Application For Musicians
- Founded: September 2009; 17 years ago
- Headquarters: San Francisco, California, United States
- Owner: Google
- Launched: March 2010
- Current status: Inactive

BandPage was a music startup based in San Francisco, California that produced the application BandPage, which powered over 500,000 artists' Facebook Pages. Artists could upload and share tracks, videos, photos, and their touring schedule within Facebook. In August 2010, Billboard named BandPage one of the "Top 10 Best Digital Media Startups".

On February 12, 2016, BandPage was acquired by Google via subsidiary YouTube for $8 million, which discontinued features on the band page editor and other website features.

== See also ==
- Social network
- Social software
