= Online wedding =

Online video game event

Something most often seen in massively multiplayer online role-playing games (MMORPGs), online weddings date back to the beginning of online communities and early online games such as MUDs. Two people who wish their avatars, or characters, to be married will create an event that resembles a standard wedding. This became very popular with the introduction of Ultima Online, which not only provided rings, outfits and decorations, but sometimes even Gamemasters to officiate. This tradition has carried forward into several other MMORPGs and virtual communities.

Some games offer special Bonuses to players who participate in a virtual wedding. In many cases the participants do not know each other outside the virtual community. Some couples may not even know each other's true name, gender, etc. Some do, in fact, extend this union outside the virtual, but most do not.

There is no legal recognition for virtual marriages. Some couples have joined in what appear to be legally binding unions through other mediums such as instant messaging or videoconferencing. These ceremonies are presided by the same appropriate officials and witnesses needed for a standard union. Some of these unions occur across state or even national borders.

== History ==
In 1997 gaming magazine Next Generation reported that 20 virtual weddings had taken place in Meridian 59, an MMORPG which was commercially launched in September of the previous year.

== The Lord of the Rings Online ==
In April 2007 Salon.com reported that The Lord of the Rings Online had dropped a planned feature for in-game players marriage because of the controversy around the possibility of same-sex and inter-species weddings. One developer stated that the design rule was for weddings to be allowed if examples could be found in the book, as between elves and humans. The online magazine for gaymers GayGamer.net commented that, while Tolkien was a devout Roman Catholic, his stance on gay marriage isn't known as the topic wasn't a public issue at the time. Video game critic Ian Bogost compared it to the case of The Sims 2, a blockbuster video game that did allow same-sex marriage.
