= Steven G. Blum =

American lawyer

Steven G. Blum is an American attorney and educator who has been teaching in the Department Legal Studies and Business Ethics at the Wharton School of the University of Pennsylvania since 1994. He is a visiting professor at the ALBA Graduate Business School in Athens, Greece. Blum's research interests include ethics in the professions, how interests and incentives influence professional conduct, the training and socialization of professionals, and the effects of conflict-of-interest and asymmetric information on the financial services industry. Blum has six times won the William G. Whitney Award for outstanding teaching.

Mr. Blum was first admitted to the bar in 1984. He clerked for the judges of the New Hampshire Superior Court (1984-1985). He has admitted to practicing law in New Hampshire, Pennsylvania, and the District of Columbia.

He has consulted and conducted negotiation training programs at Citigroup, General Electric, Bristol-Myers Squibb, Marathon Oil (MAP), Dupont, The Association of American Medical Colleges, University of Buffalo School of Medicine, and The University of Vermont College of Medicine. He frequently teaches in executive education programs at The Wharton School. He was an expert in university student judicial systems and held related positions at Dartmouth College and The University of Pennsylvania.

Mr. Blum is the author of the book, Negotiating Your Investments: Use Proven Negotiation Methods to Enrich Your Financial Life. '

Mr. Blum earned the Bachelor of Arts degree from Wesleyan University (1981), the degree of Juris Doctor from Northeastern University (1984), a Master's degree in the Law of Taxation from New York University (1996) and a Master's degree in Education from Harvard University (1989). In addition, he completed the Specialization in Negotiation and Dispute Resolution at the Program On Negotiation (PON) at Harvard Law School (1990).
