= Butterfly Soup =

2017 video game

- Developer: Brianna Lei
- Engine: Ren'Py
- Platforms: Windows; macOS; Linux
- Release: September 16, 2017
- Genre: Visual novel
- Mode: Single-player

Butterfly Soup is a visual novel developed by Brianna Lei and published in September 2017 for Windows, macOS, and Linux. The game has the player follow the perspectives of four LGBT Asian-American girls in Fremont, California, alternating between their first year of high school in 2008 and when they were young children. The coming-of-age story shows them as they join a baseball club and centers on the romance between the main characters, Diya and her friend Min.

Lei developed the game over two and a half years, inspired by sports anime and teen drama shows to write a game that relied on the personalities and characterization of the protagonists. Lei tried to develop a game that she would have wanted when she was in high school, with elements of her own upbringing as an Asian-American child and an open perspective on sexuality. Critics praised the game's story and writing, especially for its realistic depiction of teenagers and strong characterization. It was named the "best visual novel" of 2017 by PC Gamer and was nominated for the Excellence in Narrative award at the 2018 Independent Games Festival. A sequel, Butterfly Soup 2, was released in 2022.

== Gameplay ==
Butterfly Soup is a visual novel, wherein the player advances through scenes with static two-dimensional images of characters. The player's primary interaction with the game is selecting dialogue options and deciding the order of actions. The game is mostly linear, with the exception of scenes where the player can select the next location or object to engage with. Unlike many visual novels, Butterfly Soup does not feature a branching narrative; the player's choices can impact the wording of individual scenes but do not change the overall story. The game's plot alternates its focus between four major protagonists, with the player taking the role of the four different viewpoint characters from a first-person perspective.

== Plot ==
Diya in conversation

The game is set in Fremont, California in 2008. It follows four LGBT Asian-American girls as they attend their first year of high school and bond as members of a baseball club. The four protagonists are the strong and shy Indian-American Diya, the short and aggressive Korean-American Min-Seo, the quirky and energetic Indian-American Akarsha, and the smart and dedicated Chinese-American Noelle. Additional characters include Min's twin brother Jun-Seo and baseball captains Chryssa and Liz.

The narrative focuses on each of the four girls in turn, alternating between the present day and their time during the third grade. It opens with Diya in third grade, showing her friendship with Min and hinting at Min's budding crush on Diya, before Min abruptly moves away to Florida. In the present day, it shows Diya's friendship with Akarsha and Noelle and her realization that she is a lesbian. It finishes with the trio collectively deciding to try out a new baseball club and discovering that Min has moved back to Fremont.

In Noelle's section, the narrative shows her relationship with Diya and Min in third grade, and her discontent with her academically demanding parents. In the present day, the four girls play a practice scrimmage with the baseball club. Noelle decides to join the club with the other girls after her mother tells her that any time spent with her friends is wasted. In Akarsha's section, set entirely in the present, the girls play a baseball game against a team from Jun's school. They win due to Min's knuckleball pitching, which she had promised Diya in third grade that she would learn. Diya and Akarsha both come out to each other, and Akarsha informs her that Min likes Diya back.

In Min's section, the game shows her relationship with her abusive parents and her discomfort with traditional femininity. The baseball club goes for a team outing at a restaurant, where Min asks out Diya. Akarsha and Noelle advise Min for their lunch date the next day at a shaved ice dessert store. At the date, after realizing that the pair have followed them to the store and are also advising the nervous Diya, Min kisses her, and the group returns to school. In an after-credits scene, adult Diya and Min adopt a dog together.

== Development ==
Butterfly Soup was developed by Brianna Lei over the course of two and a half years. Prior to its release, the 23-year-old Lei had been developing indie video games for five years. She did so primarily while a student in Interactive Media+Games at the University of Southern California and later professionally as a game writer. She has said that her most popular game prior to Butterfly Soup was her first, Pom Gets Wi-Fi.

When developing the concept for Butterfly Soup, Lei was inspired by sports anime shows such as Haikyu!! and Free! and teen drama series such as Skins. She felt that the "mundane" settings caused the stories to rely on the personalities and characterization of the protagonists, and wanted to make a game with a similar style. The art and gameplay style were inspired by the Ace Attorney series of visual novels. Lei did not have much experience with visual novels, and so was not concerned with genre conventions. She settled on a concept of a "baseball yuri" game set in the San Francisco Bay Area. Lei created characters from multiple Asian backgrounds based on her own experience growing up in California, and also as a reaction to watching teen dramas that did not have Asian characters from more than one background. She wanted to make the characterization one that she would have wanted when growing up, as part of her general development philosophy to make games that she would want to play, rather than making design decisions based on imagined audience preferences.

The first draft of game, with the working title "Queen of Diamonds", was intended to be much longer than the final result, covering the characters' entire freshman year. It concluded with the graduation of the two older baseball captains. Additionally, the project had Diya and Min as the sole protagonists with Diya as the only point of view character and Min a member of a different baseball team, and had the pair's first kiss much later in the year. Akarsha and Noelle were included as supporting characters, and the story would cover multiple baseball games throughout the year. Lei decided early on in development, however, that the game was too long for her background in creating short stories and games, and ended it halfway through the school year with only a single full baseball game and Diya and Min's date as the conclusion. She also elevated Akarsha and Noelle to major characters due to their strong personalities, and split the viewpoint between all four main characters. Shortening the game, however, resulted in removing planned plot and character arcs for Akarsha, Noelle, and supporting characters, which she later moved to Butterfly Soup 2. Lei found that development took over a year longer than she had planned; she has said that she eventually had to force herself to stop writing new scenes instead of finishing artwork in order to actually release the game.

Lei wrote the plot of the game first, and then built the dialog around humorous lines and other elements of her personal life. Diya was the first character designed; even before deciding on the baseball theme Lei had designed Diya to have a baseball aesthetic. She gave Diya deafness in one ear, which led to her having social anxiety; she then designed Min to have an opposing design as "tiny and hyper aggressive". Akarsha and Noelle were then designed to be the same height in contrast. The four girls were "loosely designed" to be the opposite of each of the others in one aspect, such as Noelle and Akarsha representing order vs. chaos, and Noelle and Min representing logic vs. emotion.

Lei released a demo of the game on itch.io on May 29, 2017, followed by a full release on September 16. It was originally released in English for Windows, macOS, and Linux, with fan-made translations to several other languages added later. It also has unofficial web browser, Android, and iOS ports. Lei allows players to purchase the game for any price. She felt that the game should even be available for free because her younger self would have "needed a game like this", while being unable to pay for it without discussing the purchase and the game's subject matter with her parents.

== Reception ==
Butterfly Soup was named the "best visual novel" of 2017 by PC Gamer and was nominated for the Excellence in Narrative award at the 2018 Independent Games Festival. Polygon listed it as one of the best indie games of 2017. Rock Paper Shotgun described it as "an insta-hit, and [...] a contemporary classic", and said it was one of the most popular visual novels of 2017 for players and critics. Carolyn Petit of Kotaku, in 2023, said that it was "a masterpiece, a rare and profound game that was, for me, one of the defining and essential works" of its time. A paper presented at the International Conference on the Foundations of Digital Games in 2018 described it as at the time the most popular example of "queer romance in games", and Verge: Studies in Global Asias used it in 2021 as a primary example of a new wave of visual novels that were politicized games with queer themes. Laptop Mag noted it as still being one of the foremost titles on itch.io in June 2022.

Critics were very positive towards the game, focusing primarily on the writing, particularly the themes and humor. Caty McCarthy of VG247 called it a "cult hit" and that it had been widely praised for its subject matter, tone, and humor. D. M. Moore of The Verge praised the writing, which they felt created believable teenage characters. Brittany Vincent of PC Gamer similarly praised the writing, and said that the game's "frank treatment of sexuality", and the way it integrated the character's feelings into their characterization without relying on tropes, made it special. Allegra Frank of Polygon focused their review on the writing as well, and called it "one of the most moving, memorable stories I've experienced all year". They said that the characters all felt like real teenagers, and praised how the game used race and sexuality without letting it overwhelm the characters. Patricia Hernandez of Kotaku named the game as one of her five favorite of the year due to its writing, particularly the humor and characterization. While critics did not focus on the gameplay as much as the writing, The Verge's review did praise the game's use of the player's choices in controlling the pacing and in revealing who the characters were, rather than controlling them or changing the narrative.

== Legacy ==
After the release of the game, Brianna Lei planned to create a sequel to cover the parts of the game that were cut from the design. She said a few months later in early 2018 that it was planned for release in mid-2019, though she warned that she was likely underestimating how long it would take. She released the sequel, Butterfly Soup 2, for Windows, macOS, and Linux on October 29, 2022. It continues the story of the four protagonists, with further emphasis on Noelle and Akarsha. The game is a similar length to the original, and is also available for "pay what you want" on itch.io.
