= Katherine Cross =

Local legend in Oklahoma, US

Katherine Cross (March 13, 1899 – October 10, 1917) was a young Oklahoma woman, whose headstone epitaph which read, "Murdered by human wolves," was a source of local legend. Her grave (the headstone has been stolen as of July 2016) is located in Konawa Cemetery in Konawa, Oklahoma.

Cross may have been the victim of a botched abortion. A fictionalized account of her death appears in the novella "Murdered by Human Wolves," by Steven E. Wedel.

== Life and legend ==
Cross was born on March 13, 1899, to J.T. and M.K. Cross. She died at the age of 18, on October 10, 1917. The cause of her death was not commonly known, leading her grave to become a popular "ghost story" setting and source of legend. Many modern legends pertaining to the unusual epitaph, "Murdered by human wolves," claim that her body was found shredded to pieces, that she was killed by werewolves, or that she was killed by the Ku Klux Klan.

According to the October 25, 1917, Seminole County News, however, Cross died while under the care of Dr. A.H. Yates and Fredrick O'Neal, a schoolteacher from Konawa who was acting as his assistant. Her death certificate lists the cause of death as a "criminal operation" and many feel because to the time period and the location that this refers to a botched abortion.

This, according to the news article, was the "Second Charge" against Yates and O'Neal. They were held in county jail for the death of 18-year-old Elise Stone. Stone was admitted to Dr. Yates' office on August 15, 1917, and remained there for four days, after which she was taken home and died there. According to Dr. Yates, her death was the result of a "congestive chill". Although most of Konawa was satisfied with Dr. Yates' explanation, the few who were suspicious contacted County Attorney A.G. Nichols. Nichols and the county physician, with an order from M.L. Rascoe, Justice of the Peace, exhumed her body to perform an autopsy and the findings also listed the cause of her death as a "criminal operation."

== In fiction ==
A fictionalized account of Cross's death appears in a 2004 novella by Steven Wedel, "Murdered by Human Wolves." In the story, a family of werewolves, along with the town doctor, kill Cross. The novella comes with a nonfiction account of the author's interview with Mary Franklin, a paranormal researcher who has studied Cross's life.

This headstone is also referenced in the Reservation Dogs episode "Deer Lady." The episode is centered on the child abuse that took place in American Indian boarding schools, culminating in the death of one of the episode's characters. The episode closes on the character's headstone, which reads "Killed by human wolves", referring to the workers at the boarding school featured in the story.
