= Gail Gaymer Martin =

American novelist (1937–2023)

- Born: August 28, 1937; Detroit, Michigan, U.S.
- Died: September 10, 2023 (aged 86); Arizona, U.S.
- Education: Wayne State University
- Occupation: Novelist
- Writing career
- Period: 1994–2023
- Genre: Romance

Gail Gaymer Martin (August 28, 1937 – September 10, 2023) was an American novelist and Christian speaker.

== Early life and teaching career ==
Gail Martin was born on August 28, 1937, and raised in Michigan. She studied at Wayne State University and gained her Bachelor and master's degrees.

Martin worked as an English teacher, Public Speaking teacher and guidance counsellor at Madison High School. She was also an adjunct instructor of English and public speaking at Davenport University.

== Writing career ==
Martin started her writing career when she formatted several Christmas programs for her church and submitted them to CSS Publishing in September 1994.

In January 1995, Martin received her first book contract, six months before she retired from her job as school counselor. She sold her first novel to Barbour Publishing in 1998 which was released in October 1998.

Martin co-founded American Christian Fiction Writers.

== Personal life and death ==
Martin lived in Sedona, Arizona, with her husband, Bob Martin. Along with writing, Gail Martin enjoyed music and singing as a soloist and choir member at her church; she was a member of the Detroit Lutheran Singers.

Gail Martin died on September 10, 2023, at the age of 86.

== Awards ==
In 2002, Martin won the American Christian Fiction Writers (ACFW)'s Carol Award in the short contemporary romance category for A Love For Safe Keeping.

In 2012, she won the Romantic Times Reviewers Choice award.

== Books ==
=== Novels ===
- Seasons (1998) ISBN 978-1-57748-477-6
- Dreaming of Castles (1999) ISBN 978-1-57748-555-1
- Better to See You in Once Upon a Time (2000) ISBN 978-1-57748-975-7
- Upon a Midnight Clear (2000) ISBN 978-0-373-87123-0
- Yuletide Treasures in Christmas Thread (2000) ISBN 978-1-57748-811-8
- To Keep Me Warm in Home For Christmas (2001) ISBN
- Apple of His Eye in The English Garden (2001) ISBN 978-1-58660-389-2
- Her Longing Secret (2001) ISBN 978-0-373-19545-9
- Secrets of the Heart (2001) ISBN 978-0-373-87154-4
- Let's Pretend... (2002) ISBN 978-0-373-19604-3
- Once a Stranger in German Enchantment (2002) ISBN 978-1-58660-396-0
- Over Her Head (2002) ISBN 978-1-58660-603-9
- A Love For Safe Keeping (2002) ISBN 978-0-373-87168-1
- The Christmas Kite (2003) ISBN 978-0-373-78508-7
- All Good Gifts in The Harvest (2003 co-authored with Cynthia Rutledge) ISBN 978-0-373-87230-5
- The Butterfly Garden in Easter Blessings (2003 co-authored with Lenora Worth) ISBN 978-0-373-87209-1
- Then Came Darkness Hidden Motives (2004) ISBN 978-1-59310-257-9
- That Christmas Feeling Christmas Moon (2004 Hardcover) ISBN 978-0-373-78528-5
- Michigan (2004) ISBN 978-1-59310-434-4
- An Open Door From Italy With Love (2004) ISBN 978-1-59310-081-0
- Adam's Promise (2005) Large Print ISBN 978-0-7862-7759-9
- Out on a Limb (2005) ISBN 978-1-59310-117-6
- Finding Christmas (2005) ISBN 978-0-373-81123-6
- Christmas Moon (2005 Paperback, co-authored with Catherine Palmer)
- Mackinac Island Anthology (2006) ISBN 978-1-59789-032-8

==== Loving series ====
- Loving Treasures (2002) ISBN 978-0-373-87184-1
- Loving Hearts (2003) ISBN 978-0-373-87206-0
- Loving Ways (2003) ISBN 978-0-373-87241-1
- Loving Care (2004) ISBN 978-0-373-87249-7
- Loving Promises (2005) ISBN 978-0-373-87301-2
- Loving Feelings (2005) ISBN 978-0-373-87313-5
- Loving Tenderness (2005) ISBN 978-0-373-81237-0

==== Monterey Peninsula series ====
- And Baby Makes Five (2007) ISBN 978-1-59789-638-2

==== Michigan Island series ====
- In His Eyes (2006) ISBN 978-0-373-87387-6
- With Christmas in His Heart (2006) ISBN 978-0-373-87405-7
- In His Dreams (2007) ISBN 978-0-373-87443-9
- Family in His Heart (2008) ISBN 978-0-373-87463-7

=== Miscellaneous ===
- And Baby Makes Five, (2008)
- The Christmas Kite, (2008)
- Dad In Training, (2009)
- Monterey Memories, (2009)
- Groom In Training, (2010)
- Bride In Training, (2010)
- A Dad of His Own, (2011)
- A Family of Their Own, (2011)
- Christmas Gifts, (2011)
- A Dream of His Own, (2012)
- Her Valentine Hero, (2013)
- The Firefighter's New Family, (2014)
- Rescued by the Firefighter, (2014)
- With Christmas in His Heart & The Forest Ranger's Christmas, (2020)

=== Nonfiction ===
- Writing The Christian Romance (2007) ISBN 978-1-58297-477-4
