= GaymerX =

American non-profit

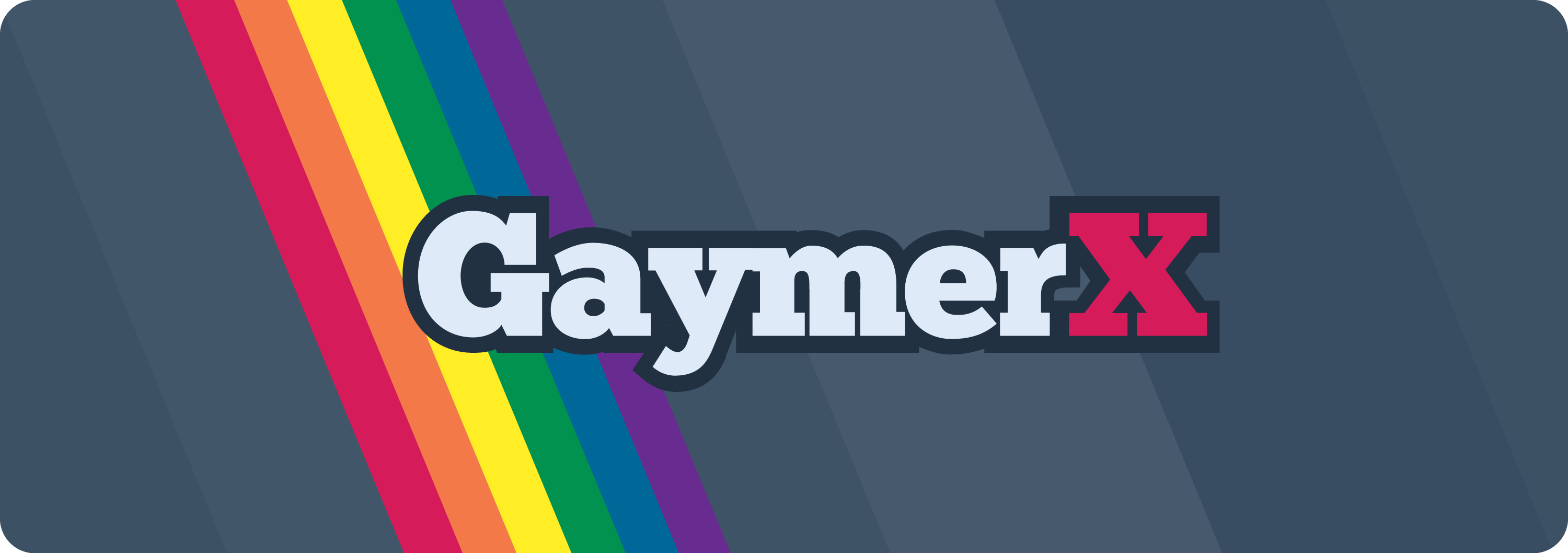
- Tax ID no.: 47-4583146 (EIN)
- Legal status: Active
- Location: Berkeley, California, United States

GaymerX is an American public-benefit nonprofit corporation based in California dedicated to celebrating and supporting LGBTQ people and culture in the world of gaming, with a focus on video games. GaymerX puts on a fan-facing convention with LGBTQ-oriented gaming and geek culture, or gaymer, with panels primarily focused on LGBTQ issues and debates in the gaming industry.

== History ==
GaymerX was founded in August 2013 by Matt Conn and Toni Rocca as part of MidBoss.

The goal was to establish a space for those who felt larger gaming conventions like E3 were unwelcoming places for LGBTQ gamers. The first GaymerX event was financed through a crowdfunding campaign on Kickstarter, and occurred on August 3–4, 2013 in San Francisco, CA. Organizers have said the event is about uniting gay gamers, not creating a division among gamers, as they want to create a "safe place" for LGBTQ gamers.

The planned convention began with significant news coverage of its initial Kickstarter launch, but the event achieved more widespread attention after the anti-gay Westboro Baptist Church, known widely as a hate group that pickets espousing homophobic statements, announced that they would protest the convention.

GaymerX began with a Kickstarter project launched on August 1, 2012, which was covered by sites such as Examiner and GamePolitics.com. The convention raised over $14,000 in its first two days, exceeded its goal of $25,000 as early as August 6, and ended with over $90,000. Throughout the fundraising campaign, organizers added new support levels, in addition to existing support levels that include admission to the event and voice acting from Ellen McLain. At a session during the convention, McLain took part as assistant to a marriage proposal to help an attendee propose to his boyfriend by voicing a version of the song Still Alive with reworked lyrics.

Logo for GaymerX2.

GaymerX2 was held at the InterContinental Hotel between July 11–13, 2014 in downtown San Francisco. It featured Darren Young, the first openly gay wrestler in the WWE, who revealed that he would be a playable character in the upcoming WWE 2K15.

In July 2017 Gaymerx officially incorporated as a 501c3 nonprofit, separating it from MidBoss. At this time a board of directors was formed consisting of Raymond Lancione, Tanya DePass, Brian Kunde, Soraya Een Hajji, Steven Harmon, and Eugenio Vargas. Matt Conn was replaced by Toni Rocca as executive director.

In 2018 Matt Conn was accused of labor rights violations. While Matt had not been affiliated with GaymerX since the organization split from MidBoss the previous year, he was the head of MidBoss, which had been a major sponsor of past events. In response GaymerX announced they were cutting all ties with MidBoss, and would no longer allow them to sponsor future events. Although shortly afterwards Matt resigned from MidBoss, the two organizations have had not had any further relationship.

In April 2018 GaymerX named a new Executive Director, Katie Kaitchuck, replacing Toni Rocca. Since her appointment, they have launched a new scholarship program to help LGBTQ developers get into the industry.

In January GaymerX East 2019 was announced and planned to take place on April 27–28 at the Microsoft Conference Center in Times Square. On February 14, 2019, it was announced that GaymerX East 2019 had been cancelled.

=== Events ===
Name	Dates	Venue	Location	Atten.	Guests of Honor
GaymerX	Aug 3 – Aug 4, 2013	Hotel Kabuki & Hotel Tomo	San Francisco, California	1,400	Ellen McLain, Zach Weiner, Matthew Michael Brown, Anna Anthropy, John Patrick Lowrie, Pandora Boxx
GaymerX2	Jul 11 – Jul 13, 2014	InterContinental Hotel	San Francisco, California	1,900	David Gaider, Mattie Brice, Alexis Ohanian, Gordon Bellamy, Darren Young, Zach Weiner, 2 Mello, Colleen Macklin, Jaime Woo
GXDev: Everyone Creates	Jan 9 - Jan 11, 2015	PubNub	San Francisco, California	60	Johnnemann Nordhagen, Anna Kipnis, Kortney Ziegler, Matt Conn
GX3: Everyone Games	Dec 11 – Dec 13, 2015	San Jose Convention Center	San Jose, California	2,429	Jennifer Hale, Zach Weiner, Anita Sarkeesian, Rob Jagnow, Jamin Warren, Natasha Allegri, Trixie Mattel
GaymerX • Year Four	Sep 30 – Oct 2, 2016	Santa Clara Convention Center	Santa Clara, California	2,100	Dave Fennoy, David Gaider, Tim Cain, Kitty Powers
GaymerX East	Nov 12 – Nov 13, 2017	Microsoft Technology Center	New York City, New York	?	Kitty Powers, Mattie Brice, Robert Yang, SAMMUS, Shawn Alexander Allen, Tanya DePass
GaymerX East 2019	cancelled (was Apr 27 – Apr 28, 2019)	Microsoft Conference Center in Times Square	New York City, New York		Brandon Stennis, Katherine Cross, D.J. Kirkland

== GXDev: Everyone Creates ==
GXDev: Everyone Creates, was a game jam and hackathon that happened over January 9–11, 2015 and featured over 40 developers who produced over 10 games featuring queer content and themes, including one about "dating butts", and one about polyamory.

Award	Game Name
Judge's Choice	Patchwork
Crowd Choice	Fatal[e]
Diplomacy Award	Here’s Your Fuckin’ Papers
#suchridiculous	Cheek 2 Cheek
The Whole Picture (Most Complete)	Cactus Seeking Hug
Best Feminism	Fatal[e]
LSD Award	Cosmic Endeerment
Tobii EyeX Award	Cosmic Endeerment
Firebase Award	We Are Here
Volume Award	Consensual Chaos
Strangest Game	Patchwork
Prismatic Award for Diversity	Cheek 2 Cheek
Best Message	Shiny Things

== See also ==
- ClexaCon – Former annual fan convention
- Flame Con – LGBTQ+ multi-genre fan convention in the United States
- Gaylaxicon – LGBT-focused science fiction convention
- LGBTQ culture in San Francisco
- Video games in the United States – Video game industry in the United States
