= Gaymer =

LGBTQ gamer

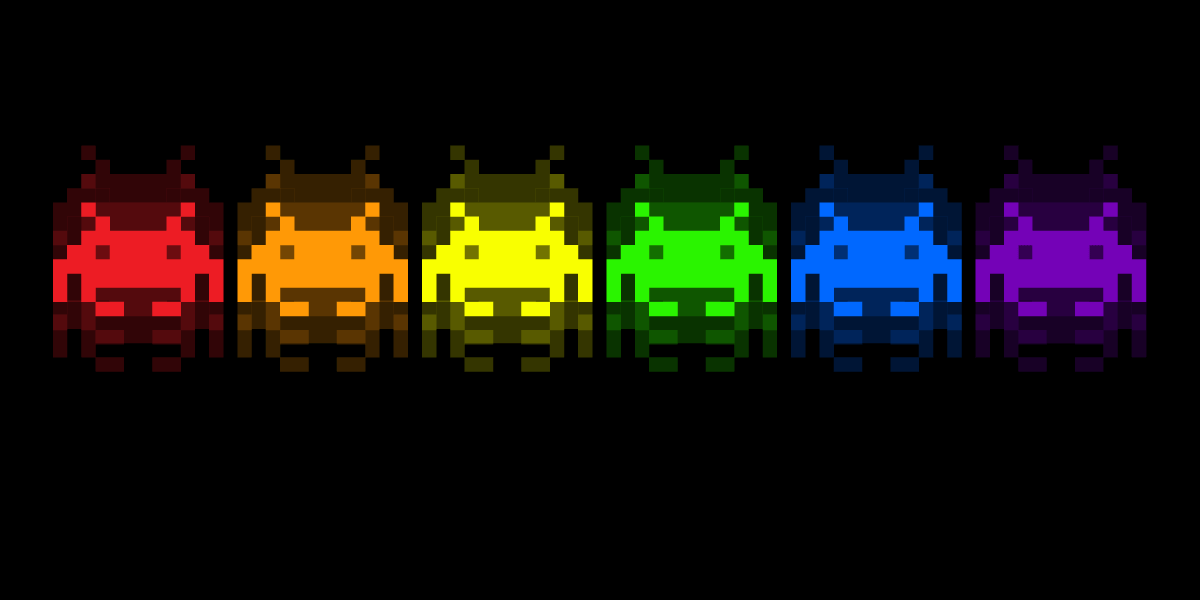
Background designed by the Electronic Frontier Foundation to represent gaymers

Gaymer and gay gamer are umbrella terms used to refer to the group of people who are identified as homosexual and have an active interest in video games or tabletop games, also known as gamers. Bisexual and transgender gamers are often categorized under this term.

This demographic has been the subject of two large surveys that attracted press coverage: by Jason Rockwood in 2006, who noted the level of prejudice that gaymers endure, and by Paul Nowak in 2009 focusing on what gaymers expect of video games. A gaming convention oriented to LGBTQ gaming and geek culture, GaymerX, first took place on August 3 and 4, 2013, in San Francisco.

Chris Vizzini, owner of the gaming site Gaymer.org, was involved with a controversy and legal dispute over the trademark of the term gaymer, which ended when Vizzini surrendered the right to the term and the trademark was cancelled. In recent years, more and more representation of gaymer culture can be seen and predominantly featured in video game studios worldwide.

== Surveys ==
=== 2006 University of Illinois ===
In 2006, a sociological study at University of Illinois at Urbana-Champaign looked at the gay gamer subgroup focusing on the profile of a "gaymer", and concerns they have regarding the perception of them in the gaming community and visibility of gay characters in games. The study's author noted the level of prejudice that gaymers endure: "Gay gamers experience a double edged sword of prejudice... The mainstream gay culture and media is not supportive of video games. Then you have the video game culture that is not supportive of gay culture. So you have these people stuck in the middle who have this double edged prejudice." With approximately 10,000 respondents, the survey exhibited a reverse bell curve of gamer sexuality with most people identifying as either completely heterosexual or homosexual. Only a "very small minority" of the respondents to the first survey supported the use of the term gaymer.

=== 2009 Full Sail University ===
In late August 2009, Full Sail University student Paul S. Nowak began a second survey of gaymer play preferences. The survey focused on "questions of content such as plot, genre, customization and other in-game experiences."

The survey team reported that over 7000 people participated in the survey. The results of Nowak's survey were used by Nowak to "build a profile of the gay gamer community and gain unique insight into this financially untapped demographic". These results were not published in an academic journal, though a later Nowak's book lists gaymers as preferring role-playing video games, pertaining to the hardcore explorer/achiever gamer type, and appreciating good plot and good quality homosexual content, which he defines as game content "which reflects homosexual orientation in a positive or equal-to-heterosexual-orientation context".

== Social and cultural aspects ==
=== Marketing to LGBT consumers ===
The misconception that young, white, heterosexual males were the force driving the industry forward was strongly challenged by the record-breaking success of The Sims. Video game developer Maxis had resisted Will Wright's goal of creating the title on the grounds that "girls don't play video games." The title was seen as unappealing to young heterosexual males. In the 1990s, the industry began to make some effort to market games to women by creating software titles with strong, independent female characters.

Even some games that are considered to appeal mainly to the non-traditional demographic continue to censor homosexuality. But some video game companies are now moving to further expand their marketing base to include the perceived market of affluent gaymers by including LGBT characters and supporting LGBT rights. Critics of the suppression of gay identity often conclude that, as homosexuality is normalized in broader culture, it will be in video games as well.

=== Working inside the industry ===
Dani Bunten, a transgender woman, designed some of the earliest multiplayer games. In 1996, Jacques Servin, a Maxis employee, was fired when he put implied gay characters into the SimCopter game. Some reports state Servin claimed to have done it because he was upset at being grossly overworked at Maxis, while others cited it as a political statement.

Well-known gay writer and movie director Clive Barker was involved in the creation of the games Undying and Jericho.

=== Online communities ===
The umbrella term quickly expanded throughout the internet which gave rise to popular online communities which provide a safe space for LGBT gamers and the LGBT gaming culture. Most notable of those on Reddit r/gaymers, r/gayming and VoIP gaming app Discord, Gaymers, London Gaymers, Gaymers iNC, Aussie Gaymer Network and UK Gaymers.

== Media coverage ==
=== World of Warcraft LGBTQ guilds ===
One reason many cite for the lack of visible participation by gaymers is the unwelcoming regulations of in-game interactions such as the creation of and advertisement of queer-friendly guilds in MMORPGs such as World of Warcraft. Players who attempt to use the general chat channel for recruitment can experience a backlash of harassment and verbal abuse from other players as well as the game moderators. In cases like this, game companies and administrators may alienate game players through intensive policing.

In 2006, Sara Andrews started a lesbian, gay, bisexual, transgender and queer-friendly Warcraft guild to create a safe place for this community. In January 2006, Andrews used the general chat channel, because most guilds recruit members this way, to recruit players to her LGBTQ-friendly guild "Oz".

After posting this, goal administrators quickly contacted Andrews informing her that this was a breach of the games terms of service. The Blizzard terms of service asserts that "sexual orientation," including both clear and masked language, which "insultingly refers to any aspect of sexual orientation pertaining to themselves or other players" is banned. Andrews "was warned by a Blizzard game master that this violated the company's policy on harassment," and "Blizzard went so far as to threaten Andrews with banishment from the game if she continued". Blizzard later apologized for this warning, saying that an administrator misinterpreted the policies against harassment.

=== The Escapist issue Queer Eye for the Gamer Guy ===
Video game magazine The Escapist devoted Issue 222 to gay gamers and characters with the title "Queer Eye for the Gamer Guy" (similar to the TV show title).

=== Same-sex marriage in The Lord of the Rings Online ===
The MMORPG game The Lord of the Rings Online dropped a planned online marriage feature because of the controversy around restrictions on same-sex and inter-species marriage. The online magazine for gaymers GayGamer.net commented that, while J. R. R. Tolkien was a devout Christian, his stance on gay rights is not known as the topic was not a public issue at the time.

=== GaymerX convention ===
On July 31, 2012, a Kickstarter project was started for GaymerCon, which was later renamed to GaymerX, for a convention that billed itself as being "the first gaming convention focused on LGBTQ geek culture." Within five days, the Kickstarter project passed the funding goal of 25,000 USD, and after the full funding period of 30 days, the project reached the final total of $91,389.

GaymerX took place on August 3 and 4, 2013, in San Francisco. The event has received support from Electronic Arts and GLAAD.

=== Trademark controversy ===
In April 2007 Chris Vizzini, owner of the gaming site Gaymer.org, sought to trademark the term gaymer with respect to online communities and obtained it in March 2008. In 2012, he sent a cease and desist letter to Reddit's /r/gaymers subreddit forum, for alleged trademark infringement. Vizzini has been criticized by the reddit and gaymer communities, who cite examples of use from as early as 1991, and a Yahoo Groups online community with that name created in 2000. Vizzini's website was taken out of service in September, 2012; he has claimed that this was due to a denial of service attack. On two occasions Vizzini posted new threads to the /r/gaymers forum explaining his position and apologizing for "hurting his own people", but not for filing the trademark.

On January 24, 2013, members of /r/gaymers, supported by pro bono lawyers from Perkins Coie and Electronic Frontier Foundation, filed a petition at the US Patent and Trademark Office to cancel Vizzini's trademark on the term, on the basis that it was used with that meaning since the mid-1990s. Vizzini re-stated his intent to defend the trademark on the site's name, that he started as an online community on 2003 as a way to build a positive brand from a term that had negative connotations.

On June 25, 2013, it was announced that Gaymer.org was being officially closed down. On August 22, 2013, the US Patent and Trademark office officially canceled the trademark after Vizzini decided to surrender the mark.

=== Nintendo's Tomodachi Life controversy ===
Tomodachi Life is a life simulator video game developed and published by Nintendo in 2013. The game allows for the creation of avatars known as Miis to interact with one another which received public backlash for restricting gameplay to only heterosexual relationships . Nintendo responded by stating that "Nintendo never intended to make any form of social commentary with the launch of 'Tomodachi Life,'" Nintendo of America Inc. said in a statement. "The relationship options in the game represent a playful alternate world rather than a real-life simulation. We hope that all of our fans will see that 'Tomodachi Life' was intended to be a whimsical and quirky game, and that we were absolutely not trying to provide social commentary." Nintendo later apologized for the incident and disappointing their fans stating "We apologize for disappointing many people by failing to include same-sex relationships in Tomodachi Life," Nintendo said in a statement released Friday. "Unfortunately, it is not possible for us to change this game's design, and such a significant development change can't be accomplished with a post-ship patch."

In the 2026 Sequel, Tomodachi Life: Living the Dream, Nintendo included queer options, such as the ability to romance characters of the same gender and have Non-binary Mii characters.

== See also ==
- LGBTQ culture
- LGBTQ themes in video games
- List of video games with LGBTQ characters
- Video game culture
