= Virtuix Omni =

Virtual reality treadmill

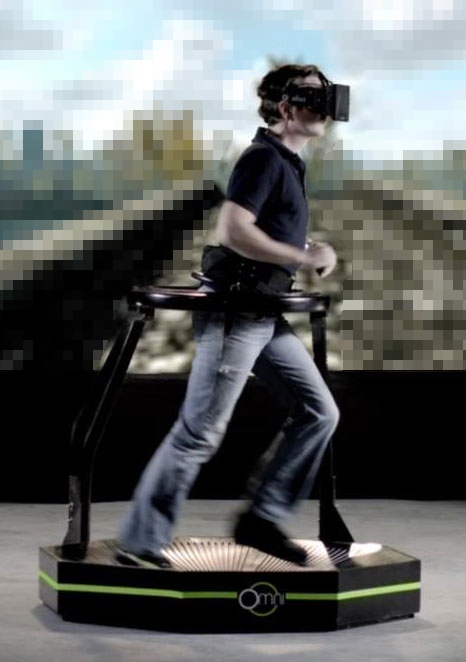
- Image of Virtuix Omni
- Inventor: Jan Goetgeluk
- Manufacturer: Virtuix Inc.
- Current supplier: enterprise.virtuix.com/commercial-inquiries/
- Website: www.virtuix.com
- Notes; Released January 2017

The Virtuix Omni is an omnidirectional treadmill simulator for virtual reality games and other applications. It uses a platform to simulate locomotion i.e. the motion of walking, requiring both special shoes or shoe covers and a surface that reduces friction. It works in conjunction with the HTC Vive, and allows a Vive user to physically walk within a limited number of supported games.

In 2013, the Virtuix Omni became one of the ten biggest technology Kickstarter campaigns, raising $1.1 million in funding. Since then, Virtuix has raised another $35 million from private and institutional investors.

Although originally stated to be released in January 2014, production of the Omni only began in November 2015.

Kickstarter backers began receiving their orders during the third week of January 2017.

As of mid-2017 the company no longer offers this version of the Omni (the "Omni Pro") to consumers, instead supplying it for commercial use only. Virtuix has shipped more than 3,500 Omni Pro systems to date to over 500 commercial locations.

An updated consumer version of the device, called the "Omni One" had been planned for release by the end of 2021, though the first units were not shipped to investors until March, 2023.

== History ==
Virtuix was founded by Jan Goetgeluk. The prototype for the Omni used dummy shoes and Kinect software to detect movement instead of the sensor system that became part of the final product. He applied for a U.S. patent on 23 October 2013 for his Locomotion System and Apparatus. Virtuix presented the prototype of the Omni at the Electronic Entertainment Expo 2013 in Los Angeles, California where it was reported on by Engadget and other electronic publications, including The Verge.

Virtuix launched a Kickstarter campaign in June 2013 to raise money for manufacturing. The campaign was endorsed by Oculus Rift founder Palmer Luckey and overshot its funding goal of $150,000 within three and a half hours of it being posted. The campaign raised a total of $1.1 million when it closed, making it one of the top 10 biggest technology crowdfunding campaigns at the time. Goetgeluk presented the Virtuix Omni on an episode of the TV show Shark Tank in 2013, after selling approximately 3,000 units in the Kickstarter campaign. He failed to obtain funding from the Sharks after asking for $2 million for 10% of the company. However, Shark Tank investor and billionaire Mark Cuban invested in Virtuix after the airing of the show. In 2016, the company tested the waters under Regulation A for a potential offering of shares to the public.

The Omni presented at SXSW in 2014 where Virtuix founder Jan Goetgeluk also spoke on the topic of virtual reality. The final version of the Virtuix Omni was presented at the 2015 Consumer Electronics Show in Las Vegas, Nevada. The Omni was also present at E3 in 2015, where it won an award for Best Technology.

In January 2016, the first production Omnis began to ship to consumers. In December 2016, Virtuix announced that they would not be able to fulfill international pre-orders, citing the logistical and financial difficulties of shipping such a large item internationally. As an apology, Virtuix refunded these customers with an additional 3% interest, compounded annually. Kickstarter backers began receiving their orders during the third week of January 2017.

In September 2017, Virtuix announced Omniverse™, their proprietary content delivery and arcade management platform for commercial entertainment venues. Omniverse allows customers to preview and launch games from a VR interface, and enables operators to manage multiple Omnis from a single device such as a tablet, and keep track of analytics from a web-based Control Center.

Omniverse currently features 24 virtual reality games optimized for arcade use. Among the first games to be released was Fallen Planet Studios' "Affected The Manor." - in a statement, the studios' co-founder Mark Paul said: "Omniverse represents an opportunity for us to launch our game on more than a thousand commercial entertainment systems at once, without the hassle of individual licensing agreements. We are excited to release Affected on the Omniverse platform and reach a worldwide audience in places that we hadn’t been able to capture before."

The most recent game added to Omniverse is "Dead Zone."

In March 2018, an omnidirectional treadmill based on the Omni's design played a prominent part in Steven Spielberg's movie adaption of Ernest Cline's novel, Ready Player One. An Omni had been provided by Virtuix to the studio during production.

In November 2018, Virtuix unveiled their highly anticipated Omni Arena e-sports attraction at the IAAPA Attractions Expo in Orlando, together with their partner Funovation. More than 350 attendees signed up for a VIP demo before the show had started and press coverage was very positive following the reveal - Forbes named Omni Arena as one of the key stories of IAAPA 2018.

Omni Arena features four Omni 2.0 motion platforms and brings e-sports out-of-home, giving anyone who plays a chance to win in ongoing weekly and monthly prize contests with an annual prize pool of over $100,000. Its key features include an automated staging area for quick player setup and minimal attendant labor, mini-games to facilitate social interactions between players during setup, social sharing stations to share gameplay footage after playing, and a queuing app to eliminate wait lines and boost utilization. The attraction is also capable of broadcasting competitions over the live-streaming platform, Twitch.

The first installations of this new attraction was completed in March 2019.

In October 2020, Virtuix publicly revealed the latest design of their omnidirectional treadmill, called "Omni One". It was scheduled for release in 2H 2021, and marks a return to their original vision of providing a VR treadmill for the home; however, the first units had not began shipping to investors until March, 2023. Changes include the removal of the support ring that encircles the user's waist, allowing for greater freedom of movement for the user's arms. It also enables crouching, kneeling, and jumping. It will be offered as both a separate "dev-kit", and also as a bundle with a standalone VR headset (no PC required). The choice of headset has not been finalised, but their promotional video shows a Pico Neo 2.

== Product overview ==
The Omni is a locomotion simulator designed to work as a game controller, and allows gamers to physically walk within the game environment in which they are playing. It is used in tandem with the HTC Vive for a full virtual reality game setup. The surface is bowl-shaped and requires special low friction shoes or shoe covers. It uses inertial sensors to track a person's position, the length of their stride, and how fast they are moving. The information is then sent to a computer which translates the data into the game movements.

The current Omni Harness design keeps the player stable in the Ring, without needing leg straps. As it rests on top of the support Ring, the player is able to turn rapidly while walking, jogging, or running, without the user having to rotate the vertical support along with them. Since its first release, the motion tracking has also improved, allowing for a wider range of player speed.

Omni One uses a vest instead of a harness, for increased freedom of movement.

=== Other uses ===
The Virtuix Omni can also be used for military and sports training.

== See also ==
- Haptic suit
- Cyberith Virtualizer
- Wizdish ROVR
