= Hyper Reality Experience =

The Hyper Reality Experience is a mixed reality, multi-player game experience, which opened to the public in Leeds, England on 22 April 2017. It utilises a combination of virtual reality, motion tracking, haptic feedback and theatrical special effects to create an immersive experience where players can interact as a team within a virtual environment, with other senses such as touch provided by a specially designed physical space and props the player can feel and utilise.

The games (Currently "MineForce: The Rebellion", with others under development) are designed for groups ranging from 4 to 10 players, with games lasting for 15 minutes.

== History ==
The Hyper Reality Experience is claimed to be the UK's first Virtual Reality game experience, and was created by Ali Khan, a former J. P. Morgan executive, and Samrien Hussain, a former school sports development co-ordinator, who also run the multi-city chain of escape games "Tick Tock Unlock" in the United Kingdom.

== Technology ==
Players use HTC Vive VR headsets to navigate the virtual experience. In the current Leeds venue players are tethered to computers, with an area specifically designed for each player. Future venues will use HTC Vive VR headsets connected to a backpack on the player, and optical tracking used to track the players within the environment, with the environments re-configurable with props depending on which game the players choose to experience.

The physical space contains walls etc. mirroring the virtual reality environment, allowing players to feel their environment, and pick up and use props such as guns. Other sensory features such as heat (e.g. when standing next to a fire) and wind (e.g. the gust from a mine-shaft) are also utilised).

On-staff "Game Masters" also act as guides for the players throughout the game.

== Games ==
At the Leeds venue, players can experience the game "MineForce: The Rebellion", where teams are within a mineshaft and players travel vertically trying to shoot crystals, canisters and drones. Two other games are being developed.

== Locations ==
Currently Hyper Reality Experience is located in Leeds (UK) within the Trinity Leeds shopping centre, and is the first of a planned 10 UK venues to launch by 2019. The current Leeds installation is designed to fit within a retail environment, using 664 square feet of space; Future locations are expected to have dedicated environments exceeding 2000 square feet.

== Other Facts ==
Curtis Hickman, the CCO of The VOID first coined the usage of "Hyper Reality" to describe immersive virtual experiences back in 2016.
