= The Void (virtual reality) =

Virtual reality entertainment attraction franchise

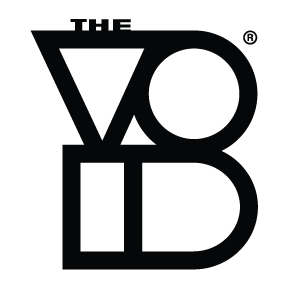
- Industry: Virtual reality entertainment
- Headquarters: Pleasant Grove, Utah, United States
- Areas served: London, Dubai, Malaysia, Toronto, Atlanta, Austin, Dallas, Orlando, Minneapolis, New York, Philadelphia, Washington, D.C., Anaheim, Glendale, Santa Monica, Hollywood, Edmonton, Mississauga, Las Vegas
- Key people: Curtis Hickman, Ken Bretschneider, James Jensen, William Welsh, Clayton Talley
- Products: Virtual reality "theme park" attractions
- Owner: VR Exit, LLC
- Website: Official website

The Void was a franchise of virtual reality entertainment attractions. Co-founded by Ken Bretschneider, James Jensen, and Curtis Hickman as a re-focusing of a plan to build an attraction at Evermore Park in Pleasant Grove, Utah, and described by some as being a virtual reality "theme park", these facilities feature virtual reality experiences leveraging a combination of head-mounted displays with positional tracking, haptic feedback and special effects systems to allow patrons to freely explore and interact with virtual settings within the confines of specially designed environments. The Void's locations closed permanently in March 2020.

The Void's first location was established in Pleasant Grove in 2015. In July 2016, The Void debuted a Ghostbusters-themed virtual reality attraction at Madame Tussaud's in New York City. The company subsequently began a partnership with the Disney Accelerator program and co-developed attractions based on Walt Disney Studios properties, such as Star Wars, Wreck-It Ralph, and the Marvel Cinematic Universe, and opened locations at Disney theme parks. In 2020, the company defaulted on a loan amid the COVID-19 pandemic, prompting Disney to terminate the company's licensing agreements and leases.

The Void has since gone on to lose $5.6 million dollars in a lawsuit brought on by the Mall of America over back rent.

== History ==
The Void was co-founded in 2014 by CEO Ken Bretschneider, CCO Curtis Hickman, a visual effects artist and former stage magician, and James M. Jensen, an entrepreneur and interactive media designer. Bretschneider and Hickman had been developing a fantasy-themed theme park in Pleasant Grove, Utah, known as Evermore Park. One of its planned attractions was an experience that would combine virtual reality technology with a physical environment.

However, due to a lack of funding and its estimated cost of nearly $400 million, Bretschneider announced in August 2015 that the Evermore project would be placed on hold and that his team would focus on developing its hyper reality concept into a "virtual entertainment center" known as The VOID (an acronym of "The Vision of Infinite Dimensions"). Mayor of Pleasant Grove Mike Daniels explained that "the size and scope of [Evermore] outgrew both the size of the land they had purchased and the amount of capital they needed to raise in addition to the millions of dollars Ken put up for the project." A smaller version of Evermore Park did eventually open in September 2018.

The company opened its first location in Pleasant Grove mid 2015 with "Curse of the Serpent's Eye". On February 15, 2016 they took that same experience to the TED conference in Vancouver. Then in May 2016, The VOID announced that it had partnered with Sony Pictures to co-develop a Ghostbusters-themed attraction, Ghostbusters: Dimension, which opened at Madame Tussauds in Times Square, New York City on July 1, 2016, as a tie-in for Ghostbusters (2016).

In July 2017, it was announced that The Void would be joining the Disney Accelerator program. Shortly after, The Void and Disney announced a new Star Wars attraction, Secrets of the Empire, for launch later in the year as a tie-in for the upcoming spin-off film Rogue One. It was being produced in a collaboration with ILMxLAB—an offshoot of Lucasfilm and Industrial Light & Magic devoted to immersive entertainment.

With the same partners, The Void announced in 2018 that it would develop five more projects with Disney, including an attraction based on Ralph Breaks the Internet, and Avengers: Damage Control, based on the Marvel Cinematic Universe.

In 2019, the company began to experience financial difficulties. including missing a payment to a supplier. In August 2019, The Void received a loan from Jim Bennett via VR Boom, LLC, with its assets as collateral. The Void's patents and trademarks were later reassigned to VR Boom, LLC as security interest. In 2020, amid the COVID-19 pandemic (which forced the closure of many of its locations), the company defaulted on the loan. In June 2020, due to the default, Disney terminated its licensing agreement with The Void and permanently closed the locations it had established at Disney Parks. Filings with the United States Patent and Trademark Office in late October 2020 stated that all of The Void's intellectual property had been transferred to the holding company VR Exit, LLC. Bennett cited progress on COVID-19 vaccines as confidence that demand for "location-based VR" would return in the future. In 2021, it was revealed that the company had been ordered to pay the Mall of America $5.6 million in back rent and related charges related to a location at the site.

== Technology ==
The Void's mixed reality experiences utilize aspects of virtual reality, haptic feedback, and other physical effects; users wear a helmet with a head-mounted display, noise canceling headphones and a hand tracking sensor. The headset is connected to a vest called a RIG (Rapture Incursion Gear) haptic suit containing 22 vibration motors and transducers. The RIG also contains a custom "backtop" computer system that processes the user's individual experience, providing visuals to the headset. The system is battery powered and designed to allow its users to freely walk through and explore a virtual world; in reality, the user is confined to a "stage" equipped with ceiling-mounted motion tracking cameras to read the user's movements. To provide physical feedback, the "stage" contains physical walls, special effects equipment such as fans, mist machines, and heat lamps, as well as props representing items such as guns and torches; all of these physical elements correspond with elements within the virtual world seen through the headset, increasing the illusion of immersion.

"If I put a hallway in front of you, it would look like a straight hallway. And if I told you to walk down the hallway and you're in full Void gear—full VR—you would walk in what you believe to be a straight line. But in the real real world, you're actually turning by 90 degrees or more as you walk. You just subconsciously don't know it because I've made you believe that you're walking a straight line. We can reuse that space. And to you, in VR, it seems like it goes on forever and ever."

— Curtis Hickman

Hickman explained that The Void would leverage his prior knowledge of magic by using "illusion design, misdirection and magic theory to create the illusion of reality, as opposed to just trying to rely only on the technology to do it." Among the illusion-based techniques used are redirected walking, which is used to give the illusion that the user is traversing a larger path in a straight line, but is actually walking through a curved hall. Redirected walking, in combination with the ability to have the same physical hallways and walls, represent different locations in the virtual space, provides the illusion that the user is traversing a location larger than the stage itself.

The original prototype of the system, which simulated the interior of a spaceship, utilized an Oculus Rift Development Kit 1 headset, a 10-foot long wall, and electromagnetic sensors for position tracking. Early iterations of The Void's vest system were updated to use the Oculus Rift Development Kit 2, along with Beats by Dr. Dre headphones, and a Leap Motion sensor for hand tracking. To overcome their limitations and improve the experience, the company intended to eventually replace these off-the-shelf parts with custom-designed components.

One of these new components was a custom-designed headset codenamed "Rapture", which features curved, per-eye 2K resolution OLED displays with a claimed 180-degree field of vision, a custom optics system, Bang and Olufsen headphones, and microphones for communication between players. The company stated that Rapture was intended to provide a higher-quality virtual reality experience in comparison to the consumer-grade hardware previously used. Bretschneider personally invested $250,000 into the Rapture project. The Void's developers also planned to replace the optical tracking system with a radio-based system. The current system utilizes markers on the helmet and props that are similar to those used in a motion capture rig, which requires that the motion tracking cameras have an unobstructed view of the stage and restrict the height of the walls.

Multiple themed experiences can be designed for use on the same stage layout; experiences used at The Void's test location included one where players explore an ancient temple, and a first-person shooter-styled mission known as "Research Facility". Outside organizations showed interest in having education-oriented experiences developed for The Void, including police training and nature exploration. VR experiences are being developed by The Void and by other partners, such as the University of Utah and video game studios.

== Locations ==
Bretschneider, Hickman and Jensen foresaw The Void as being a larger chain of virtual reality entertainment centers, consisting of a flagship location in Pleasant Grove, Utah, which the company planned to open sometime in 2016, as well as smaller locations in other markets. Each would feature one or more 60 by 60 feet (18 m) stages capable of accommodating up to 4 groups of up to 4 players each; the Pleasant Grove location was to feature eight of these stages. A proof of concept location with a 30 feet (9.1 m) stage was constructed in Lindon, Utah, next to the company's offices.

Ghostbusters: Dimension also opened at Cineplex Entertainment's The Rec Room at Roundhouse Park in Toronto in June 2017 and Cinemark West Plano in February 2019.

Star Wars: Secrets of the Empire launched on December 16, 2017, at Disney Springs at Walt Disney World Resort (with two stages), and on January 5, 2018, at Downtown Disney at Disneyland Resort. In addition, The Void opened a pop-up location at Westfield London for a 12-week run, after which it moved to a sister location Westfield Stratford City for a 12-week run there.

In July 2018, Cineplex Entertainment announced that it had signed an exclusive agreement with The Void for Canadian franchises, and would open at least five more locations including The Rec Room locations at West Edmonton Mall and Square One Shopping Centre.

By late-2018, The Void had opened attractions in London, Dubai, Malaysia, Toronto, Atlanta, Austin, Dallas, Orlando, Minneapolis, New York, Philadelphia, Washington, D.C., and the Californian cities of Anaheim, Glendale, Santa Monica, and Hollywood.

In July 2019, The Void announced plans to open at least 25 new locations in Europe and the United States by 2022 via Unibail-Rodamco-Westfield properties.

== Void experiences ==
=== The Curse of the Serpents Eye ===
For a short time in 2015, the VOID opened its demo entitled "The Curse of the Serpents Eye" to the public in Utah. This was technically the first of The VOID experiences made available to the public. It was written by the VOID's head writer Tracy Hickman and the experience was directed by CCO and VOID co-founder Curtis Hickman. Production of the experience was done by The VOID's in-house game studio.

=== Ghostbusters: Dimension ===
First opened in July 2016, the experience was originally a tie-in to the Ghostbusters reboot film; it featured the ability for visitors to participate in a "hyper-reality" ghost-hunting mission. The attraction was produced and developed by The VOID in collaboration with the respective directors of the original and rebooted film—Ivan Reitman and Paul Feig. The Script was written by the head writer Tracy Hickman and the experience was directed by Curtis Hickman. Ghostbusters: Dimension marked the first Void attraction outside of Utah. The experience was updated in 2018 to make it available in more locations. The update included an introduction by Ray Stantz (played by Dan Aykroyd) in the pre-show video, as well as the radio voice guide inside the attraction.

=== Star Wars: Secrets of the Empire ===
First opened in 2017 as a tie-in to Rogue One. As a team of Rebel Alliance recruits disguised as stormtroopers, players are sent on a mission issued by Cassian Andor (Diego Luna) to retrieve a piece of Imperial cargo on the volcanic and lava planet of Mustafar. The script was written by the VOID's head writer Tracy Hickman in collaboration with screenwriter David Goyer. The core design was done by Curtis Hickman and experience direction was done as a creative collaboration between The VOID, Lucasfilm and ILMxLab.

=== Nicodemus: Demon of Evanishment ===
Opened in 2018 as a collaboration with video game studio Ninja Theory, it is a horror experience set shortly after the World's Columbian Exposition in Chicago, where a demon had been unleashed after an accident in an "Electro-Spiritualism exhibit". Based on a story by Curtis Hickman. The experience script was written by Tracy Hickman and then designed and directed by Curtis. Nicodemus is the first VOID experience to feature two truly divergent endings. It is also the VOID's only example todate of the use of transmedia. A short book was created with clues that would help the player in the experience. The experience in turn had information that would reveal the outcome of the book.

=== Ralph Breaks VR ===
In 2018, a companion to the films Wreck-It Ralph and its sequel Ralph Breaks the Internet was developed with input by its directors Phil Johnston and Rich Moore. It was a continuation of The Void's collaborations with Disney and ILMxLab now also involving Walt Disney Animation Studios. It consists of a series of minigames set within the sequel's portrayal of the Internet, including a sequence (referencing a children's mobile game seen in the film's trailer) where the players must fight off invading bunnies and kittens using pancakes and milkshakes as ammo. It was written by Ralph Breaks the Internet screenwriter Pamela Ribon in collaboration with Tracy Hickman. The direction was again done as a creative collaboration between The VOID and ILMxLab.

=== Avengers: Damage Control ===
First opened in 2019 and set within the Marvel Cinematic Universe, the player takes control of Wakandan Iron Man suit prototypes designed by Shuri, and battle "a familiar enemy from the Avengers' past." It included appearances by Ant-Man, Doctor Strange, and the Wasp among others- all played by the original MCU cast. The attraction is a collaboration between VOID, ILMxLAB, and Marvel Studios. The attraction, originally slated for a limited release, saw such success, that it was extended thru to the end of 2019. It is the longest VOID experience to date.

=== Jumanji: Reverse the Curse ===
In a tie-in to Jumanji: The Next Level, first opened in 2019, visitors play as the title characters of the film in an original storyline voiced by Kevin Hart, Dwayne Johnson, Jack Black, and Karen Gillan. The experience was directed by Curtis Hickman and produced by the VOID in collaboration with SONY Pictures, with Tracy Hickman as the writer. As the four main characters, the player must save the world of Jumanji from the curse set by Hakaar - a demonic sorcerer. The four playable characters have unique abilities that allow them to progress through the adventure. "Heed the warning of the jungle drums! You and your companions fall into this unique world of adventure, becoming Dr. Bravestone, Ruby Roundhouse, Prof. Oberon or 'Mouse' Finbar. You risk your 'three' lives in a daring quest to return the jewel to the temple from which it was stolen. Feel the cooling mists of waterfalls and the burning heat of desert sands. Each of you has unique abilities – and you must use them together to survive. From 'dance fighting' to navigating dangerous animals, with every step you become the heroes who must 'save Jumanji and call out its name!'"
