= Cyberith Virtualizer =

Motion detector in virtual reality applications

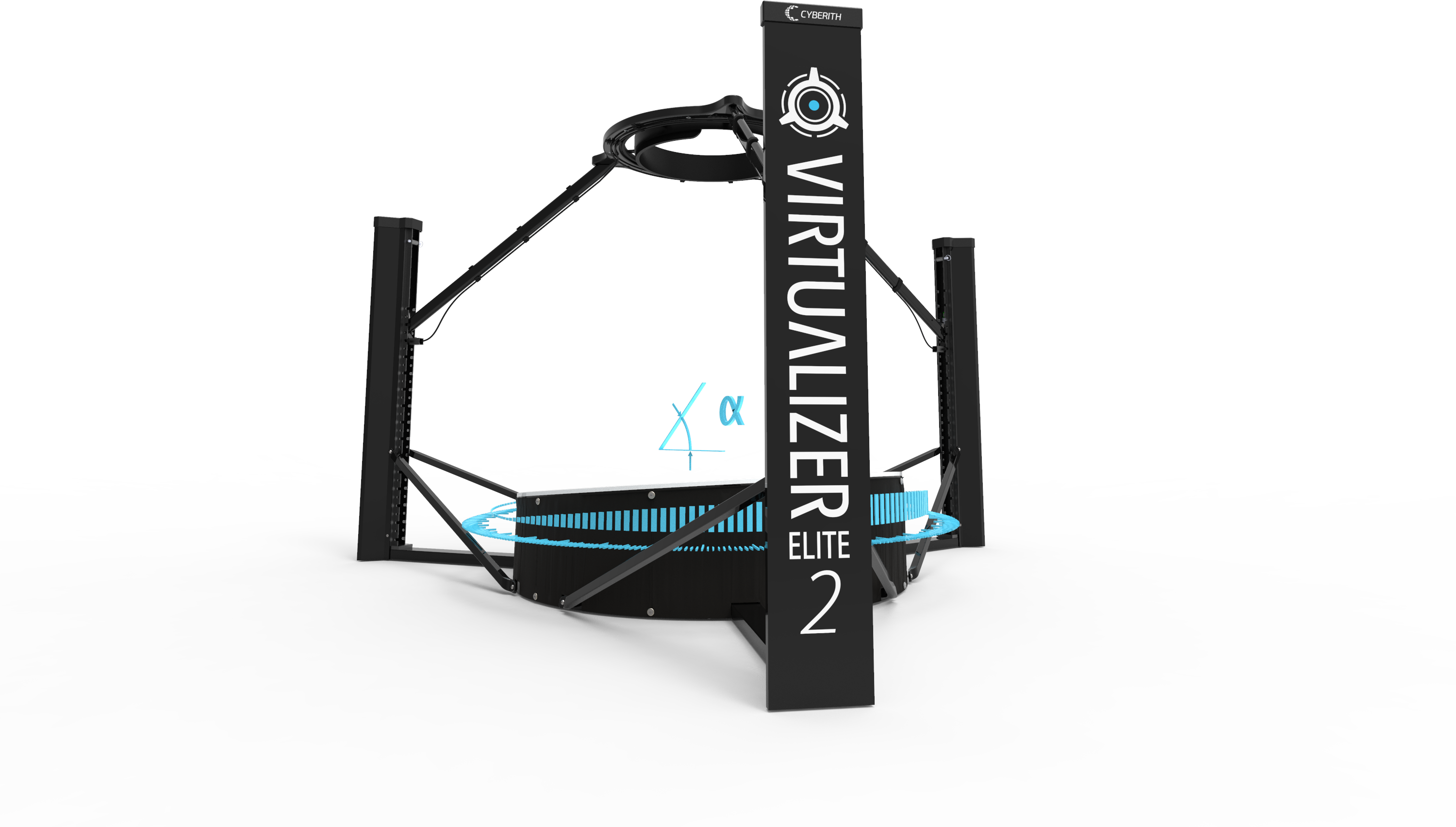
- The Cyberith Virtualizer ELITE 2
- Manufacturer: Cyberith GmbH
- Website: www.cyberith.com

The Virtualizer (or Cyberith Virtualizer) is a series of omnidirectional treadmills for virtual reality applications. The treadmills have integrated sensors for motion detection of the user. The products are being developed, manufactured and sold by the Austrian company Cyberith GmbH.

== History ==
The idea was born in 2012 by Tuncay Cakmak. During his studies at the Technical University of Vienna he started testing and developing the first prototypes. In 2013 he founded Cyberith and formed a team for further development of the device. He demonstrated the device at different exhibitions in Europe and shared the progress with the community through the Cyberith YouTube channel. A kickstarter campaign started on 23. of July 2014 and in the first 24 hours they made more than 50% of their pledged goal of 250 000 $. The campaign was successfully funded, ending at 361 452 $ from 577 backers, however the delivery of the Kickstarter rewards has been delayed beyond the initial estimate without the company providing an updated estimated delivery date. After the initial crowdfunding on Kickstarter, the company started focusing on commercial use of the Virtualizer products and launched the first generation Virtualizer VR Treadmill in 2016 exclusively to commercial customers. According to unconfirmed rumors, the company has been sued by one of its Kickstarter backers. These rumors suggest that the claim of the backer has been rejected by the court. The second generation Virtualizer was launched for business customers in March 2019 with an implemented motion platform.

== Functional principle ==
The Virtualizer enables motion by the principle of low friction. The body is fixed in a rotatable ring that can be moved vertically. In combination with a head-mounted display it allows to move, run, jump or crouch in virtual worlds. The products don't require to wear any special kind of shoes. Instead, textile overshoes are used, that are worn above regular shoes. The second generation Virtualizer uses a 2 DOF (Degrees of Freedom) motion platform to actively support the walking movement of a user. For walking forwards, the platform inclines in front of the user, so that the feet glide back more easily due to the support of gravity. When a user rotates or starts to walk backwards, the inclination of the platform follows these movements to continuously support gliding of the feet through gravity. The company claims this motorized system would improve the gait and make walking easier.

== See also ==
- Haptic suit
- Virtuix Omni
- Wizdish ROVR
