= Wizdish ROVR =

Treadmill and virtual reality peripheral

ROVR Systems
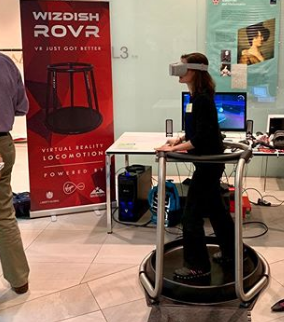
- ROVR2 in use at a convention
- Inventor: Julian Williams
- Manufacturer: ROVR Systems Ltd
- Available: 2012
- Current supplier: https://rovrsystems.com
- Website: https://rovrsystems.com

The ROVR is an omnidirectional treadmill that simulates walking and running in virtual reality when used alongside a head-mounted display.

It is developed by ROVR Systems Ltd, who market it as "The mouse of the VR world". This is due to the ROVR providing omnidirectional movement in virtual reality in a manner akin to walking in the real world. This is as opposed to the current teleportation solution. The difference can be described as navigating a website with a mouse instead of cycling through links sequentially using the tab key.

== Product overview ==
The ROVR consists of a round, concave, low friction platform and a plastic or metal frame for user support. The user slides their feet back and forward on the platform, in a reciprocating motion, to simulate locomotion whilst wearing shoe covers that are designed to reduce friction. The soles of the shoe covers are coated in ceramic discs that reduce friction between the user's feet and the ROVR. ROVR Systems also sells shoes with ceramic discs already fitted. A contact microphone in the ROVR's platform translates the sound of the user's feet moving into forward movement within virtual reality. A low level of noise, made by slow or small movements on the platform, becomes slow movement in virtual reality, whilst louder noises increase the speed of movement. The user moves in whichever direction the head or hand controllers are facing, as the acoustic sensor system can not detect the movement direction of the feet or the orientation of the body. The concave platform combined with reciprocating movement of the feet minimises vertical movement of a person's centre of mass and so mimics the best low energy movement of real walking. It also encourages the user's feet to slip back into the centre of the ROVR, stopping the user from moving off the platform. A ring encircles the user at waist height, forming a containment field. This is for user support during orientation and to provide a boundary to stop the user from moving off the platform. Users quickly become used to the platform's surface, and are able to balance without the help of the ring, their hands being free to use independent controllers such as Oculus Touch, Vive wands, Knuckles and the Xbox One Controller.

The ROVR works with multiple different head mounted displays as it interfaces with software directly and not through the headset.

=== Virtual reality sickness solution ===
By enabling naturally intuitive full physicality of movement in virtual reality the ROVR seeks to solve the problem of virtual reality sickness. Virtual reality sickness is a type of motion sickness that occurs when movement is seen but not felt when immersed in virtual reality thereby disrupting visual-vestibular matching and proprioception of the body. It is reported that two thirds of virtual reality users experience virtual reality sickness. The ROVR aims to satisfy the body's need to feel the movement it is experiencing visually by having the user perform a variation of walking in place. Studies indicate that walking in place increases the sense of presence when using virtual reality as the proprioceptive information in the body resembles the visual stimulus being provided by the head-mounted display. People do not carry memories of how they move their legs when they walk because locomotion is largely autonomous, being controlled by a Central pattern generator. The ROVR, therefore, does not rely on the exact recreation of how the legs move during ambulation, rather, it aims to provide enough activity in the legs that approximates the sensation of ambulation to 'trick' the users mind into thinking they are walking normally.

== History ==
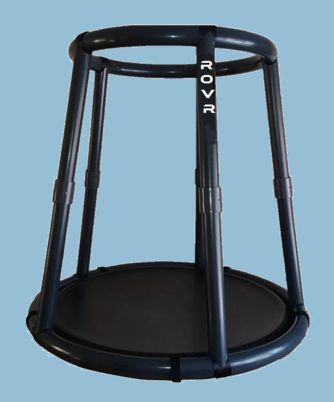
The ROVR1 launched in 2012

ROVR Systems Ltd was founded in 2009 by Julian Williams. Williams, an engineer for the BBC, had been experimenting with the idea of a 'VR treadmill' since 2001 and had applied for a US patent in 2003 which was granted in 2008. Williams was put in contact with Charles King, who holds a PhD in Physical metallurgy and the Science of Materials. King had links with several UK universities including University College London, King's College London, and Oxford Brookes University, the latter through a partnership that began when he was a consultant for Siemens. Together they developed and patented the low friction material used in the ROVR's platform base.

=== ROVR1 ===
King and Williams built a prototype version of the ROVR and began selling it in 2012 on the ROVR Systems website under the name ROVR1. The ROVR1's containment frame consists of a waist high polymer ring supported by five polymer legs that adjoin a larger ring at the base of the ROVR1. This larger ring encircles the ROVR's patented, concave, low friction surface platform. Between its release in 2012 and 2016 the ROVR1, weighing in at 15kgs, had been actively tested by over 30,000 people.

Sales of the ROVR1, along with funding from Liberty Global and Techstars, helped fund the development of the ROVR2.

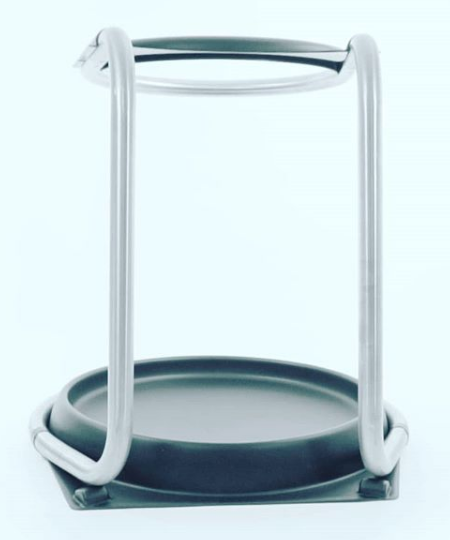
The ROVR2 launched in 2017

=== ROVR2 ===
ROVR Systems launched their ROVR2 at the VR World Congress 2017. The ROVR2 is a slightly heavier, more aesthetic version of ROVR Systems's initial prototype. It weighs 25kg. The containment frame consists of a waist high, stainless steel metal ring supported by two legs that connect to the ROVR2's base. The low friction platform of the ROVR2 also has higher sides than the ROVR1. It is also collapsible, making it portable.

== Applications ==
The ROVR's most popular application is for gaming in virtual reality. Omnidirectional treadmills increase immersion inside virtual worlds by allowing the gamer to be mobile. The gamer's feeling of 'being there' is increased by this freedom of movement as they are able to identify more closely with their in-game avatar. This is as opposed to sitting still whilst their in-game avatar moves around.

There is also potential for the ROVR in the arcade gaming market. The act of sliding the feet to navigate virtual spaces provides a novel gaming experience in a similar vein to arcade dance pads.

The ROVR requires the user to be on their feet and mobile and therefore can be used as fitness equipment in a manner similar to a regular treadmill and the Wii Balance Board. It also has the potential to aid with injury recovery by providing a low stress environment to exercise injured muscles.

The ROVR has been used by Dominator Yachts to show customers around virtual versions of the yachts they sell.

In 2014 Nissan used the ROVR to market their Juke at the Paris Motor Show. The user assumed the role of an 'iron man' figure running through a virtual city, keeping pace with a Juke driving alongside.

In 2015 Wells Fargo started on a 3 year campaign using ROVRs at public events in the US to promote the Wells Fargo brand. Mosaic, an event marketing think tank, found that after attending a Wells Fargo event 74% of the participants said they have a more positive opinion about the company, brand, product, or service being promoted. The study also found 96% of consumers who tell a friend or family member about their experience mention the company or brand running the event.

With the advent of 5G the viability for wireless head-mounted displays and peripherals is increasing. ROVR Systems is developing a bluetooth version of the ROVR which aims to provide a wireless virtual reality experience when used in tandem with a wireless head-mounted display.

== See also ==
- Virtuix Omni
- Cyberith Virtualizer
