= Mary Whitton =

American computer scientist

Mary C. Whitton is an American computer scientist specializing in computer graphics and human–computer interaction, especially concerning redirected walking in virtual worlds. She is a research professor of computer science at the University of North Carolina, the co-founder of two graphics hardware companies, and the former president of ACM SIGGRAPH.

== Education and career ==
Whitton majored in religion as an undergraduate at Duke University, graduating in 1970. She initially worked as a middle-school mathematics teacher, and earned a teaching-related master's degree from North Carolina State University in 1974. In the same year, she married computer graphics researcher Nick England, and through him became interested in computer graphics. In 1976, she began studying computer graphics at North Carolina State, eventually earning a second master's degree in 1984. Meanwhile, she and England cofounded Ikonas Graphics Systems in 1978, which made what has been described as the first general-purpose graphics processing unit (GPGPU).

Ikonas was purchased by Adage, Inc., in 1982, and in 1986 Whitton and England cofounded another company, Trancept Systems, producing graphics hardware for Sun Microsystems computers. Trancept was in turn acquired by Sun Microsystems a year later, and Whitton became a director of marketing for Sun.

Whitton became president of ACM SIGGRAPH for the 1993–1995 term. In 1995, she took her present position as research professor at the University of North Carolina. With Fred Brooks, she founded a research center in "effective virtual environments" in approximately 1998.

== Recognition ==
Whitton was a recipient of the 2013 SIGGRAPH Outstanding Service Award. The North Carolina State University Department of Electrical and Computer Engineering elected Whitton to their alumni hall of fame in 2016.
