= Novint Technologies =

American haptic device manufacturer

Novint Technologies, Inc. was an Albuquerque, New Mexico, company that designed and built haptic devices and software. Novint developed the Novint Falcon, the world's first consumer 3D touch device, which allows users to use their sense of touch in computing. Novint has two primary areas of focus, video games and professional uses of its technology. In video games, the Novint Falcon can be used to feel objects and events in the game, giving the player a more immersive experience. In the professional applications group in Novint, called the Advanced Products Group (APG), Novint's technology has been used to add the sense of touch to a variety of professional applications and projects.

== Novint Falcon ==
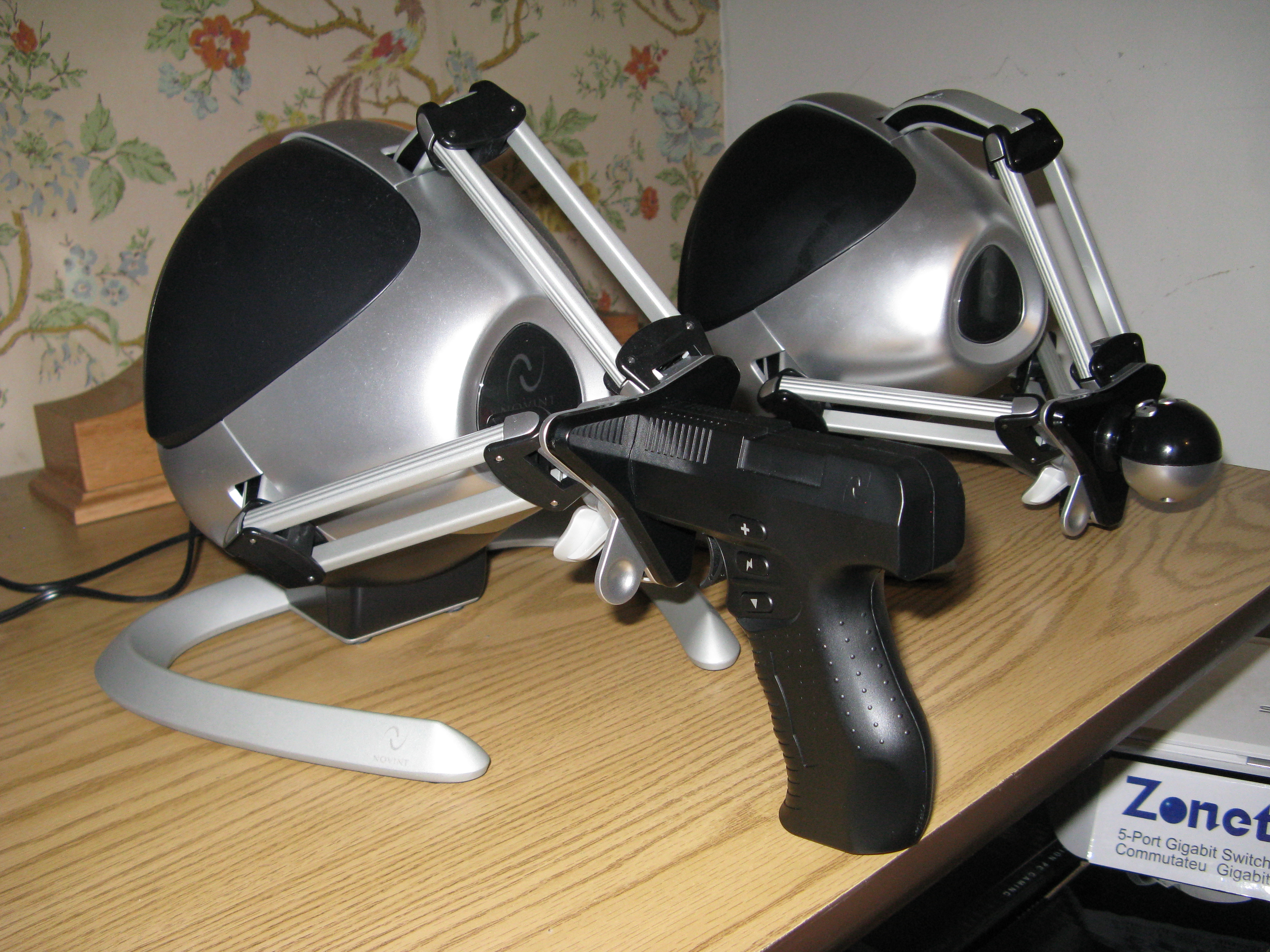
A pair of black Novint Falcons. The nearer one has the pistol grip attached, and the further one has the standard ball grip.

Novint's flagship consumer product is the Novint Falcon, a USB haptic device intended to replace the mouse in video games and other applications. The name of the Novint Falcon comes from the fact that the falcon is a predator of the mouse. The Falcon has removable handles, or grips, that the user holds onto to control the Falcon. As the user moves the grip in three dimensions (right-left and forwards-backwards, like a mouse, but also up-down, unlike a mouse), the Falcon's software keeps track of where the grip is moved and creates forces that a user can feel, by sending currents to the motors in the device. The Falcon's sensors can keep track of the handle's position to sub-millimeter resolution, and the motors are updated 1000 times per second (1 kHz), giving a realistic sense of touch. The surfaces of virtual objects feel solid, and can have detailed textures applied to them. The weight and dynamics of objects can be simulated so that an object's inertia and momentum can be felt. The actions and interactions of a character in a game can be felt, such as the feel of a recoil of a gun, the motion of a golf club, or the accelerations of a car.

The Falcon in essence is a consumer robot. It consists of its grip connected via three arms to a roughly conical body, which sits on a U-shaped base. Each of the three arms moves in and out of the Falcon's body. The default grip is a small spherical grip with 4 buttons on the top. The buttons are the Novint Logo for the primary button (which is similar to an 'N'), an upside down triangle (similar to a 'V'), a lightning bolt (similar to an 'N'), and a plus (similar to a 'T'), which collectively make the letters 'NVNT', the consonants in Novint's name and its ticker symbol as a public company. At the front flattened point of the Falcon's conical housing is a Novint Falcon logo that lights up in different colors to indicate the state of the device. The body contains 3 motors, each attached to one of the Falcon's arms by a cable that is wrapped around a capstan on the motor. As each of the 3 arms moves, an optical sensor attached to each motor keeps track of the movements of the arm. A mathematical function called a Jacobian is then used to determine the position of a three-dimensional cursor in Cartesian coordinates based on the positions of the arms. The position of that haptic cursor is therefore controlled by the Falcon's movements, and is used by the Falcon's software to determine the forces to be applied to the user. Currents are sent to the motors at the 1 kHz servo rate to present the user with an accurate sense of touch. In this way, a force can be applied to the grip in any direction, up to the maximum force (over 2 pounds of force), every 1/1000 of a second.

Novint has developed several grip accessories. On the consumer side, Novint developed a pistol grip, which is the shape of a pistol handle and attaches to the Falcon in place of the spherical grip. It has a main trigger button, and 3 side buttons. It was intended for use in First Person Shooter (FPS) games, but is generally an ergonomic grip that can be used for many applications. Novint has also developed several professional grips, including a 3 Degree of Freedom (3 DOF) grip that tracks rotations of the handle, two of which Degrees of Freedom are actuated and can present forces to the user.

== Novint software ==
3D touch software has been a primary focus of Novint since its inception, and Novint has had more focus historically on software than hardware. Novint's software was created to give users an accurate sense of touch in computing.

Novint creates software in several different categories. It has developed a low level driver software called HDAL, which stands for Haptic Device Abstraction Layer. HDAL handles the low level communications between the Falcon and the computer. Novint has created a software layer above HDAL, called HFX (i.e. Haptics Effects), which is used for creating force effects in games. Novint has developed a variety of applications for its professional projects. Novint has also published a number of video games, some of which were developed by Novint directly and some of which were existing games in which Novint added support for the Falcon. An independent group has also developed an open source driver library for the Falcon.

The Falcon is packaged with 3 applications; a tutorial, a game called Newton's Monkey Business, and the Feelin It Sports Pack. The tutorial allows users to feel a virtual sphere that can have a variety of textures applied to it. For instance, choosing an ice texture presents a hard, slippery surface to interact with, while sandpaper feels rough, and molasses presents a viscous texture the 3D cursor can move through. The tutorial also shows the feeling of dynamics through a ball attached to a rubber band which can be swung around, and a simulation of catching a baseball with a catcher's mitt. Finally the tutorial allows a user to shoot a virtual slingshot which can be used to shoot cans off a fence. Newton's Monkey Business contains 24 mini games which contains a variety of mini-games showing many different types of game interactions. The Feelin It sports pack has several sports games, including bowling, a home run derby, a three-point shootout, table tennis, and Feelin It Golf.

One of Novint's earliest games was a free download called Haptics Life 2, a Half-Life 2 mod in which the mouse controls have been replaced with Falcon controls and 3D Force Feedback was incorporated. As a result, weapons recoils, the weight of carried objects, damage dealt to the character, and character and vehicle accelerations are all conveyed by the Falcon to the player. Each gun in the game has a different, tangible recoil.

Novint has developed a variety of additional games across a wide variety of genres. As of 2009, Novint had published over 50 titles that work with the Falcon. A majority of Novint's game library is based on existing games that Novint added touch to.

Novint is currently releasing 2 types of game support, FalconHD and F-Gen. FalconHD games are games in which Novint has licensed source code access for a game, and integrates forces directly into the game. F-Gen games utilize Novint's F-Gen application to add controls and forces into games. Mods, or modifications to games, will continue to be developed by Novint and its community, but mods will generally become classified through F-Gen support.

F-Gen was developed to create a larger number of supported games and applications for the Novint Falcon with the understanding that the control and forces for many interactions in games/apps could be implemented without source code access. Novint therefore developed a system, F-Gen, where its community and users themselves could add support for games and applications, share their work, and get more game and application support more quickly, that is more robust. F-Gen was designed to be a community tool. It includes a strong scripting language and the ability to add F-Gen 'Tools', which can add functionality to F-Gen.

The F-Gen drivers emulate a mouse, and are customizeable, making the Falcon work with any PC game or any PC application. Users can adjust the movement scales for the Falcon's control, and save settings for various games. Grip buttons can be mapped to different controls in games. Novint is developing a gesture recognition system, called the Gesture Cube or G-Cube, in which a user can easily access 36 simple to remember gestures to activate any key press or macro. A movement such as moving right then moving forward, will be able to turn on a flashlight (along with haptic cues to make the movements easy to control), while down-down could make the character crouch. The G-Cube will be able to be used universally in other applications, such as mapping forward-up to 'cut' while forward-down could be mapped to 'paste'.

Beyond the FalconHD titles, there are 3 levels of game support for F-Gen. They are F-Gen Bronze, F-Gen Silver, and F-Gen Gold. F-Gen Bronze will just be basic mouse support with customized inputs. F-Gen Silver will have basic forces. F-Gen Gold will have strong force feedback support.

=== Novint games ===
With the F-Gen Beta release, all PC games can be played with the Novint Falcon. Novint and Novint's community are adding specific drivers within F-Gen to add more forces to many games.

== History ==
In 1995 Sandia National Laboratories, a United States government laboratory, bought one of the world's first commercial 3D haptic devices, and began developing haptic software. Sandia did core haptic research and research on how to use the technology for scientific visualization. It was one of the first companies in the world focused purely on the software side of the field of haptics. Anderson led the project at Sandia until 2000 at which point he founded Novint. Novint acquired an exclusive license to the technology and began to commercialize it.

Novint's vision was that the technology could fundamentally change computing, adding one of our most basic human senses and experiences to computers. Given this vision, Novint was originally focused on consumer applications, but quickly found itself in a situation where the dot com bubble was bursting and the markets were collapsing. Investments in 2001 were difficult to come by for an early stage company, so Novint focused its efforts on higher end professional applications.

Novint spent several years focusing on custom development for a variety of companies including Lockheed Martin, Chrysler, Chevron, Mobil, Aramco, Sandia National Laboratories, and Harvard University, among others.

In 2004, the cost of 3D haptic hardware was still very high, over $10,000. Novint felt that to again move towards the consumer space, it would need to develop a consumer level hardware device itself. Novint took on the daunting challenge of taking a $15,000 haptic device, licensed from its partner company Force Dimension, and turn that device into a consumer level device, robust enough for gamers, yet still have the fidelity to be used in surgical simulations.

By 2006 Novint had taken the expensive, high-end design, and working with Lunar Design, made a consumer level prototype. In June 2006, Novint went public on the OTC:BB under the ticker symbol NVNT. In late 2006, Novint put together a partnership with V-Tech to manufacture the Falcon in China.

At CES in 2007, Novint announced plans to launch the Novint Falcon as a consumer device, and on June 18, 2006 (Tom Anderson's 32nd birthday) Novint launched the world's first consumer 3D touch device, having effectively brought the cost of the hardware down two orders of magnitude (1/100 of the original cost).

At that point in time, Novint had a strong hardware solution, but felt that it needed better game support, which was one of the main focuses of the company. In May 2008, Novint made an agreement with Electronic Arts to license 7 AAA game titles. Novint then signed licensing agreements with other publishers and developers, including Valve.

In June 2009 Valve released updates to Half-Life 2: Episode One, Half-Life 2: Episode Two, Portal and Team Fortress 2 adding game support for the Novint Falcon.

In December 2009, Novint launched the first beta version of F-Gen, a tool which allowed mouse-like use of the Falcon in Windows. The program also included a scripting functionality that theoretically allowed users to integrate the Falcon into practically any game.

In February 2010, Novint launched their second beta version of their F-Gen software, integrating their proprietary G-cube functionality. Later that same month they released a small dll patch to fix a bug that had emerged in the button functionality. Both the beta and the patch were released only on the Novint forums.

== See also ==
- Delta robot
