= Evermore Park =

Defunct amusement park in Utah

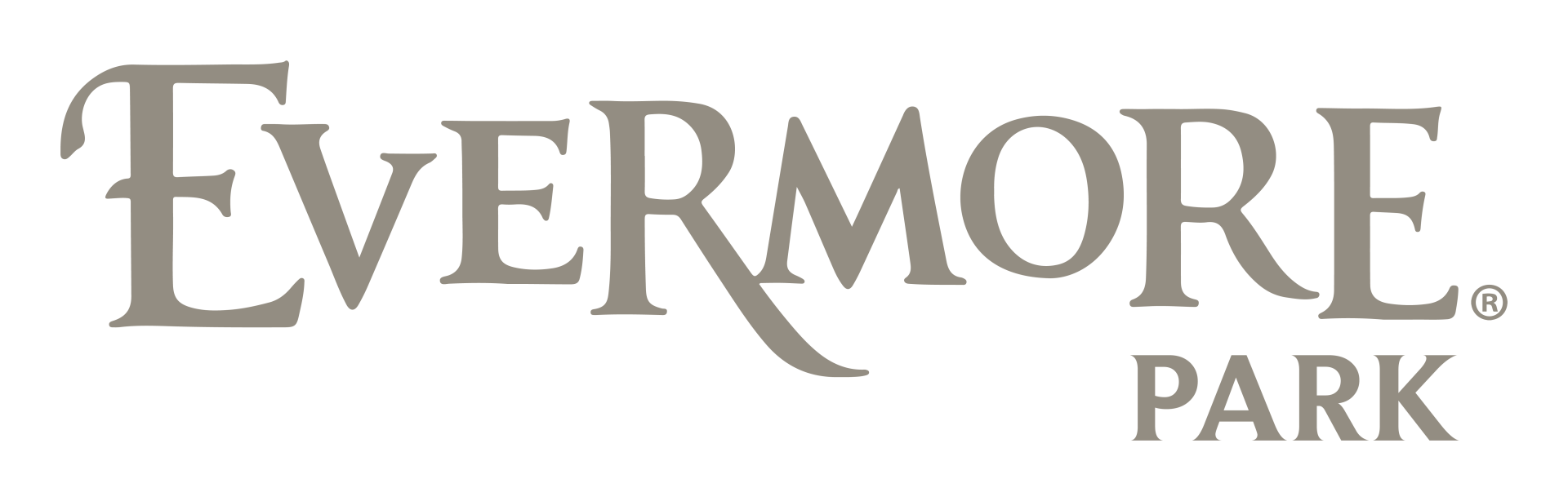
- Promotional logo
- Interactive map of Evermore Park
- Location: 382 South Evermore Lane, Pleasant Grove, Utah, United States
- Coordinates: 40.359°N 111.766°W
- Status: Permanently Closed
- Opened: September 29, 2018 (Evermore Park); Canceled (The Realm Town)
- Closed: April 8, 2024 (Evermore Park)
- Owner: Ken Bretschneider (Evermore Park)
- Operated by: Ken Bretschneider (Evermore Park); Ross McGarvey (CEO)
- Theme: Medieval / fantasy
- Operating season: Year-round, with various breaks

Evermore Park was a fantasy adventure theme park in Pleasant Grove, Utah, that opened on September 29, 2018, under the direction of Ken Bretschneider. The park allowed guests who visited to interact with trained actors who portrayed fantasy characters. The only traditional ride was "The Evermore Express", a small train that travelled around the park. Evermore was compared to the fictional Westworld, to renaissance fairs, and Choose Your Own Adventure books.

On April 8, 2024, the property's landlord declared the park closed. On August 5, 2024, Travis and Michelle Fox took over the property. On September 20, 2024, the new tenants revealed that the park would be renamed to The Realm Town. In January 2025, it was revealed that the sale of the property between Evermore and Realm ATV had been canceled. Legal actions followed.

In October 2026, author Brandon Sanderson announced he would be purchasing the property. Sanderson also stated that the entire park would need to be demolished due to safety issues and will be repurposed as an extension to the prospective Dragonsteel Plaza being built on the adjacent property. The space will no longer function as a theme park.

== History ==
=== Evermore Park ===
Evermore Park was created by Ken Bretschneider, the founder of DigiCert. According to Bretschneider, the idea for Evermore partially arose from his tradition of elaborately decorating his home in Lindon, Utah for Halloween each year. The concept for Evermore Park was debuted at Salt Lake ComicCon in 2014, with the park announced to be opened the next year. Josh Shipley left Walt Disney Imagineering to become CCO of Evermore in 2017. The park had its grand opening on September 29, 2018.

The park experienced financial difficulties, with some buildings and areas of the park remaining unfinished throughout the park's life. By June 2020, several contractors filed lawsuits claiming they had not been paid in full. One of the attraction ideas Bretschneider and visual effects artist Curtis Hickman had envisioned for the project, which would combine virtual reality with a physical environment, was spun off from Evermore into a separate business known as The Void, which also faced difficulty due to the COVID-19 pandemic.

In 2021, many of the park's actors were laid off. The land and building were sold to real estate developer Brandon Fugal of Colliers International, reportedly allowing the park to financially break even.

On November 5, 2022, YouTuber Jenny Nicholson released a video essay, detailing the history of the park, as well as how the gameplay worked. The video has 15M views as of July 2026, and inspired a parody musical detailing the park, Everfolk.

On April 8, 2024, Fugal announced the park's tenants had defaulted and been evicted from the property. He also stated a "new enterprise" would be making improvements to the park.

=== The Realm Town ===
On August 5, 2024, Travis and Michelle Fox were revealed as the new owners of the property. On September 20, 2024, they revealed that the park would be renamed to "The Realm Town". By September 29, 2024, author Brandon Sanderson bought land next to the park, with the intention to build a bookstore, as part of a project called "Dragonsteel Plaza".

Evermore filed a lawsuit against Realm ATV on January 3, 2025 due to a request from Realm ATV to lower the purchase price for the property. Realm ATV countered with a lawsuit of their own, claiming significant decay in the Evermore property's condition lowered the site's land value, and that they would not continue to pursue building The Realm Town at the Evermore site. Realm ATV also noted that the sale of properties around Evermore Park had reduced the potential crowd capacity of The Realm Town from 2,000 guests to only 185 guests. In October 2026, Sanderson announced the purchase of the remaining Evermore Park property for Dragonsteel Plaza.

== Features ==
Evermore did not have traditional rides. Instead, most of the guest experience revolved around interactions with actors in the park's fantasy setting, where guests were encouraged to roleplay for themselves and take part in the park's storyline. Visitors in the park were referred to as "World Walkers", and were permitted to come in costume. Guests were able to join one of the park's guilds by completing tasks given to them by characters.

The park also offered archery, axe throwing, and a themed train experience. Vander's Keep, a themed building attached to the park, was a restaurant and bar, and later an events venue. Other structures and experiences included the Copper Confectionary, the Crooked Lantern Tavern, Drakenhaven, and the Pigmyweed's Inn. The Crooked Lantern Tavern is the only experience to continue post-park closure in a new location.

The park was seasonal and only open on weekends. The first seasonal experience was called Lore, a Halloween-themed storyline during the fall. During the day, there was the Magical World of Lore, a family-friendly Halloween experience; at night, the park became the Cursed World of Lore, a haunted attraction. The second seasonal experience was Aurora, a winter world loosely inspired by the works of Charles Dickens. The final seasonal experience was Mythos, lasting from spring into summer.

== Taylor Swift litigation ==
Evermore entangled itself in legal proceedings with American singer-songwriter Taylor Swift. In February 2021, Evermore Park filed a lawsuit against Swift over the name of her 2020 album Evermore, alleging trademark infringement. Later that month, TAS Rights Management countersued the park on behalf of Swift, claiming that the park was playing Swift's songs "Love Story", "You Belong with Me", and "Bad Blood" without proper licensing. In March, both parties agreed to drop their lawsuits. When Evermore Park sued Realm ATV in 2025, Realm ATV's owner Michelle Fox claimed the case was similar to Evermore's prior Taylor Swift lawsuit.
