= Fonz (video game) =

1976 video game

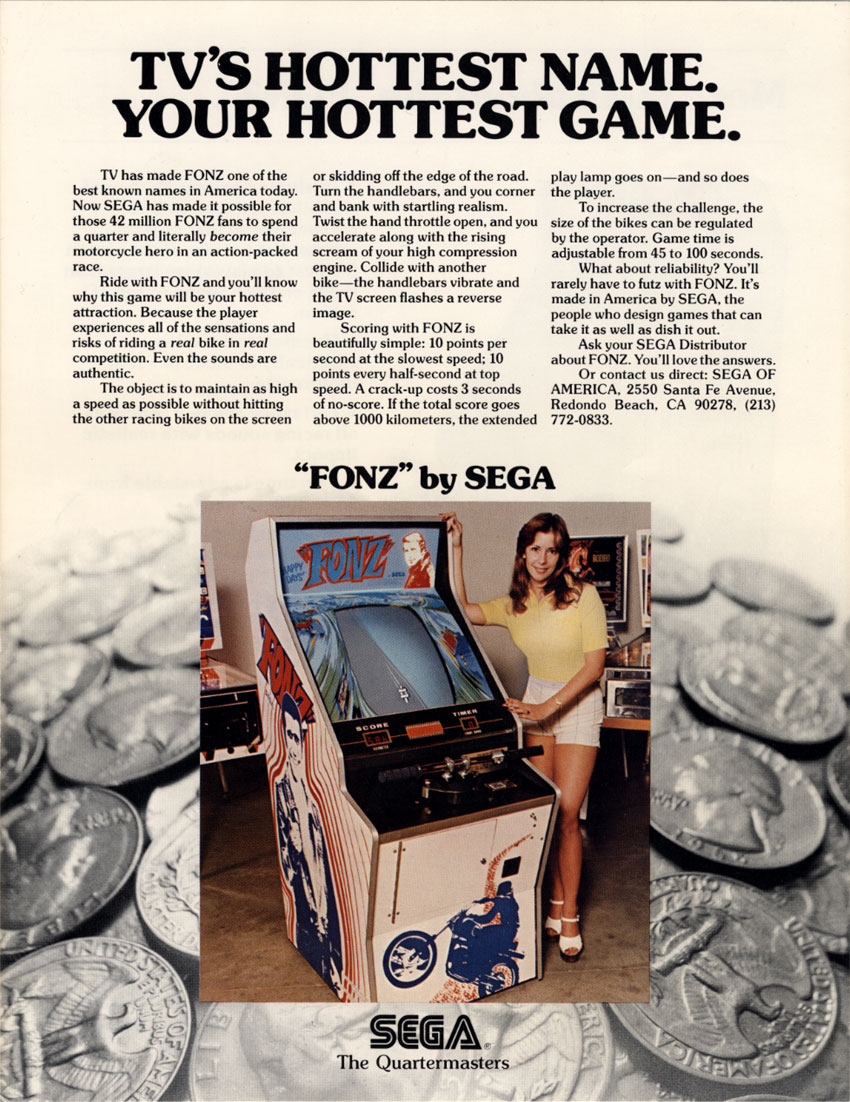
- Arcade flyer
- Developer: Sega
- Publisher: Sega
- Platform: Arcade
- Release: Road Race: JP: February 1976; NA: July 1976; Man T.T.: JP: August 1976; NA: 1977; Moto-Cross: NA: 1976; Fonz: NA: November 1976; Twin Course T.T.: JP: January 1977
- Genre: Racing
- Modes: Single-player, up to 2 players (Twin Course T.T.)
- Arcade system: Sega Discrete Logic

Road Race (Note: Japanese: ロードレース, Hepburn: Rōdo Rēsu) is a 1976 racing video game developed and released by Sega in February 1976. Later the same year, Sega released two motorbike racing variants, Man T.T. (Note: Japanese: マンT.T., Hepburn: Man T.T.) (released in August) and Moto-Cross, which were in turn re-branded as Fonz, in November 1976. The game was based on the character Fonzie (portrayed by Henry Winkler) from the 1970s TV show Happy Days, with the slogan being "TV's hottest name, Your hottest game". Sega licensed Fonz because at the time it was owned by Charles Bluhdorn's Gulf+Western Company and it was a Paramount Television intellectual property.

A two-player version of Man T.T. called Twin Course T.T. (Note: Japanese: ツインコースT.T., Hepburn: Tsuin Kōsu) was released in January 1977.

== Overview ==
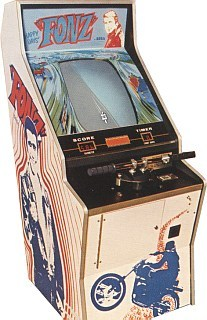
Arcade cabinet

Moto-Cross / Fonz is an early black-and-white motorbike racing game, most notable for introducing an early three-dimensional third-person perspective. Both versions of the game display a constantly changing forward-scrolling road and the player's bike in a third-person perspective where objects nearer to the player are larger than those nearer to the horizon, and the aim was to steer the vehicle across the road, racing against the clock, while avoiding any on-coming motorcycles or driving off the road. The game also introduced the use of haptic feedback, which caused the motorcycle handlebars to vibrate during a collision with another vehicle.

Fonz is a discrete logic system that uses more than 40 TTL intergrated circuits as opposed to a microprocessor. It also contains a ROM chip that contains the graphics of the motorcycle in various positions. An audio tape deck plays recorded sounds of motorcycle engines and crashes. To implement the way objects change size, the system changes its internal clock frequency, the rate at which the system operates, one each scanline of the display.

== Gameplay ==
The general premise has the player controlling Fonzie on a motorcycle with handlebars on the cabinet.

The player has to go as fast as possible without skidding off the road or colliding with other racing bikes on the screen. Turn the handlebars, and the bike will corner and bank. Twist the handle throttle open, and it will accelerate. When a collision with another bike occurs, the handlebars vibrate and the screen flashes a reverse image. To increase the challenge, the size of the bike can be regulated by the operator.

Game time is adjustable from 45 to 100 seconds.

== Reception ==
In Japan, Road Race was among the top twenty highest-grossing arcade video games of 1976, according to the first annual Game Machine chart. In North America, Road Race was reported to be doing strong business upon release. Man T.T. was among the top ten highest-grossing arcade video games of 1977 in Japan.

Fonz was introduced at Chicago's Music Operators Association (MOA) show in November 1976. It was the first time that a television character was licensed for a video game, with Sega co-founder David M. Rosen predicting the start of a new coalition between the show business and amusement arcade industries. Sega also advertised the game for having both the road and bikes seen in "true perspective on the game screen, while the player operates realistically functioning handle-bars to simulate high-speed competition riding complete with authentic motor sounds". Sega said the response to the game at the MOA show was "unanimous and enthusiastic" and that test location results were very positive. At the start of December 1976, Sega of America reported that it had manufactured several hundred Fonz arcade cabinets.

== See also ==
- List of Sega arcade games
- Tie-in
