= Aura Interactor =

Wearable force-feedback device

Aura Interactor Virtual Reality Game Wear
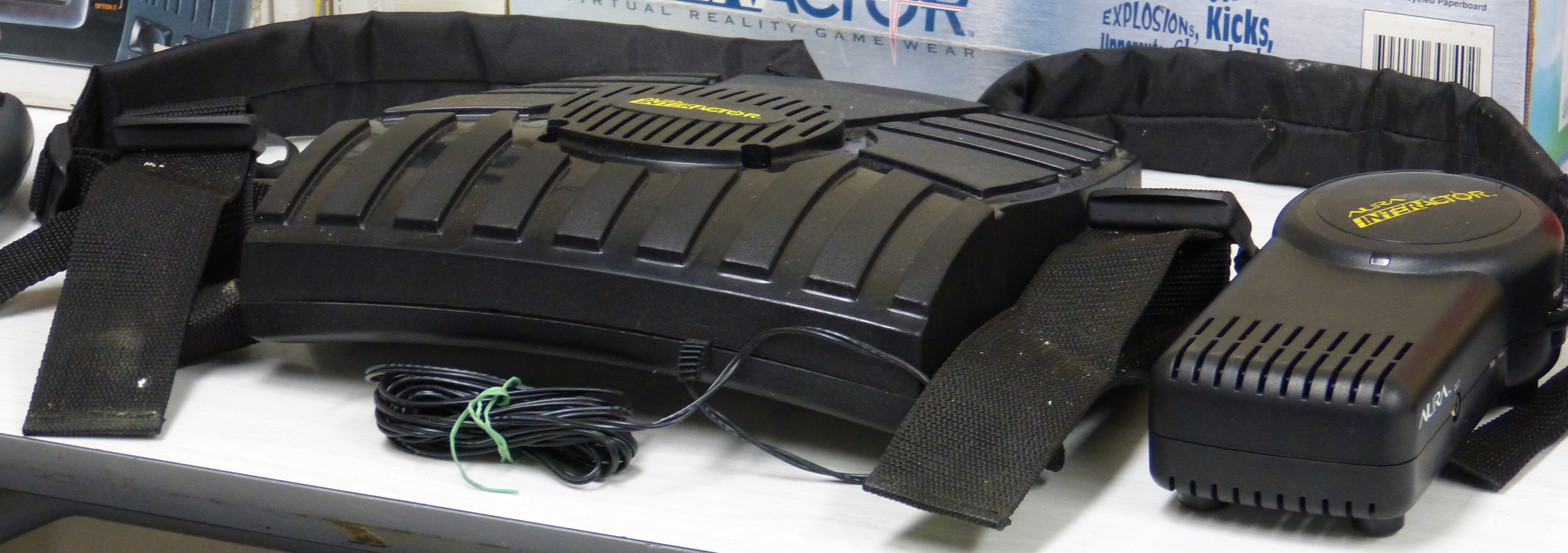
- An Aura Interactor force-feedback vest on display
- Developer: Aura Systems, Inc.
- Manufacturer: Aura Systems, Inc.
- Type: Video game console peripheral
- Generation: Fourth generation
- Released: US: September 5, 1994
- Introductory price: $100
- Media: Output device
- Related: SNES, Sega Genesis, Sega CD

The Aura Interactor is a wearable force-feedback device developed by Aura Systems that monitors an audio signal and uses Aura's patented electromagnetic actuator technology to convert low frequency audio information into vibrations that can represent actions such as a punch or kick. It was compatible with the Super NES and Sega Genesis. It is the first commercially available haptic suit, released on September 5, 1994.

== Development ==
Inspired by the movie theater sound system Sensurround, EOR technology developer Larry Shultz, then Aura's VP of Audio and Video Technologies, fantasized about what it would be like if a person could "feel" the video game, and not just hear it. Shultz, along with Cipora Lavut and Jeff Bluen, led a dedicated team at Aura in inventing the Interactor.

Aura signed a deal with Acclaim to promote Mortal Kombat II. In addition to inclusion in Aura's $5,000,000 advertising campaign, Acclaim put Interactor cards in the Mortal Kombat II game boxes and Aura packed Acclaim information in its Interactor packaging. Also as part of the deal, Acclaim programmed special audio cues into the game code which would trigger responses from the Interactor.

Aura also signed a deal with Williams Entertainment to do "strategic marketing" in relation to Williams's releases, Double Dragon V: The Shadow Falls and Troy Aikman NFL Football. Aura and Williams swapped the same kind of promotional opportunities that Aura and Acclaim did.

== Reception ==
The Interactor received an "Innovation 94" Design and Engineering Award from the Electronics Industry Association. Electronic Gaming Monthly commented, "For $100, the Interactor is a good value. It provides economy-sized virtual reality in a small package." GamePro stated, "If droppin' a C-note is no bother to you, the Aura Interactor serves its purpose." The device was found to work well with VR i-Glasses plugged in.
