= Omnidirectional treadmill =

Treadmill which can convey objects in two dimensions

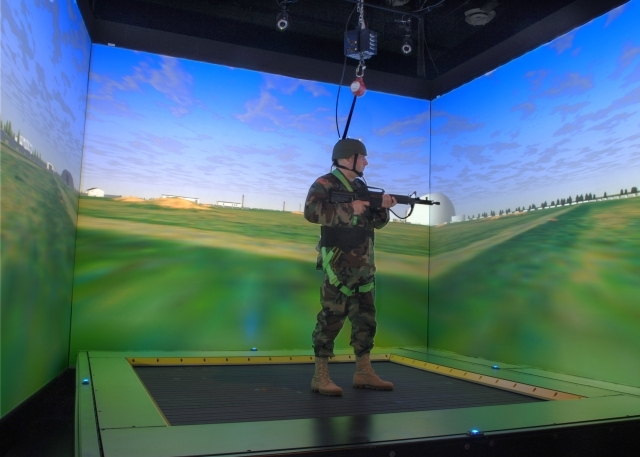
U.S. Army Research Lab's ODT with CAVE Graphics

An omnidirectional treadmill (ODT) is a mechanical device, similar to a typical treadmill, that allows a person to perform locomotive motion in any direction, allowing for 360 degrees of movement. The ability to move in any direction is how these treadmills differ from their basic counterparts (that permit only unidirectional locomotion).

Omnidirectional treadmills are employed in immersive virtual environment implementations to allow unencumbered movement within the virtual space.

Advantages to pairing an ODT with an immersive virtual environment include:

- Natural navigational movement of the system user within the enclosure while still providing contextual cueing which simulate physical traversal through the virtual terrain
- Reverting immersive navigation tasks from hand-based (mouse, joystick) to mentally hard-wired whole body (leg) based
- Enhancing immersion by providing a whole-body experience that begins at the soles of the feet and ends at the top of the head
- Facilitating whole-body haptic interaction

== Future directions and discussion ==
Natural navigation employing the ODT has two fundamental, parallel paths. One path seeks to create wholly immersive, obstruction free environments as in virtual reality, while the other seeks a lower cost, more restricted device. The immersive vision is that of a large active surface upon which the user is able to walk freely and unfettered. The second approach employs a harness for tracking, and optionally provides whole-body force feedback.

Both approaches have their advantages and disadvantages. Without a harness, the ODT user is able to accelerate away from center of the surface. The system must recognize this using a variety of sensing means, and gently accelerate the user back towards the center. Keeping the forces that return the user to center below the human sensing threshold is the main challenge with these systems. The larger the active surface, the easier it is to control using this means.

Additional routes are available, for example employing the mechanisms of two standard treadmills, one for the X and one for the Y axis. In such a setup, the mechanism for one axis would lay within the other, the belts typically being replaced with something akin to a wire ladder, and studs being used on footwear.

With a harness, the user is kept on center mechanically, and the surface area can be made much smaller. But actions such as rolling are not possible. On the plus side, a harness can provide body forces such as inertia or slope display. In addition, the harness may provide lifting force to simulate free-body flight. And the well-defined user space makes interaction with outside haptic devices feasible.

Omnidirectional treadmills have the potential to also be used in film, such as in conjunction with a green screen. This type of application would allow limitless movement by the actors.

== See also ==
- List of emerging technologies
- Redirected walking
- Simulated reality
- VirtuSphere, a similar solution to VR locomotion
