= Redirected walking =

Virtual Reality (VR) locomotion technique

Redirected walking is a virtual reality locomotion technique that enables users to explore a virtual world that is considerably larger than the tracked working space. With this approach the user is redirected through manipulations applied to the displayed scene, causing users to unknowingly compensate for scene motion by repositioning and/or reorienting themselves.

There are three currently used methods of redirected walking: Subtle, Manual, and Non-Euclidean.

== Subtle ==
This is the most immersive type of redirected walking, but also the least used. It works by subtly rotating the player object in-game, in which the player's brain will subconsciously reorient themselves to face the same in-game direction they were facing before the change. This is used when the player steps forward in their playspace (normally rotated clockwise), and when they step backward (normally rotated counterclockwise). An external viewer will notice the player walking in a circle around their playspace, but if this technique is used effectively and subtly, the player will think they're walking in a straight line. There are a scarce amount of demos with this technique, most have been lost to time. A few still available are Reddie: Rerun of Reality and Lee's Valley. A user by the name of Olivercool has been reportedly working on a game with this technique, in hopes to "help the community rediscover the magic of redirected walking."

== Manual ==
This type of redirected walking is not used in any games, but a product of rotational recentering with tools like OVR Advanced Settings, a SteamVR tool for modifying playspace translations. Users have used this app to bind a rotational translation to a button on their controllers; When they reach the end of their playspace, they hold the button and manually turn around. This keeps their player in-game facing the same way while they turn, effectively redirecting their movement. Some players made videos like "VR Manual Redirected Walking, How to" and "How to do Manual VR redirected walk" to explain this type better.

== Non-Euclidean ==
This is the final type of redirected walking, and the most commonly used one. This works by creating see-through non-euclidean portals to transfer the player from one environment to another, which can make the illusion of a larger playspace. The problem with this technique is that players have all different sizes of playspaces, so these games normally include procedural generation as a main mechanic of the game to confine and adapt the map to the users play area. Quite a few games and demos use this technique, commonly known ones are Tea for God, and TraVRsal.
