= Haptic suit =

Wearable device that provides haptic feedback

A haptic suit (also known as VR suit, tactile suit, gaming suit or haptic vest) is a wearable device that provides haptic feedback to the body.

== History ==
=== Aura Interactor (1994) ===
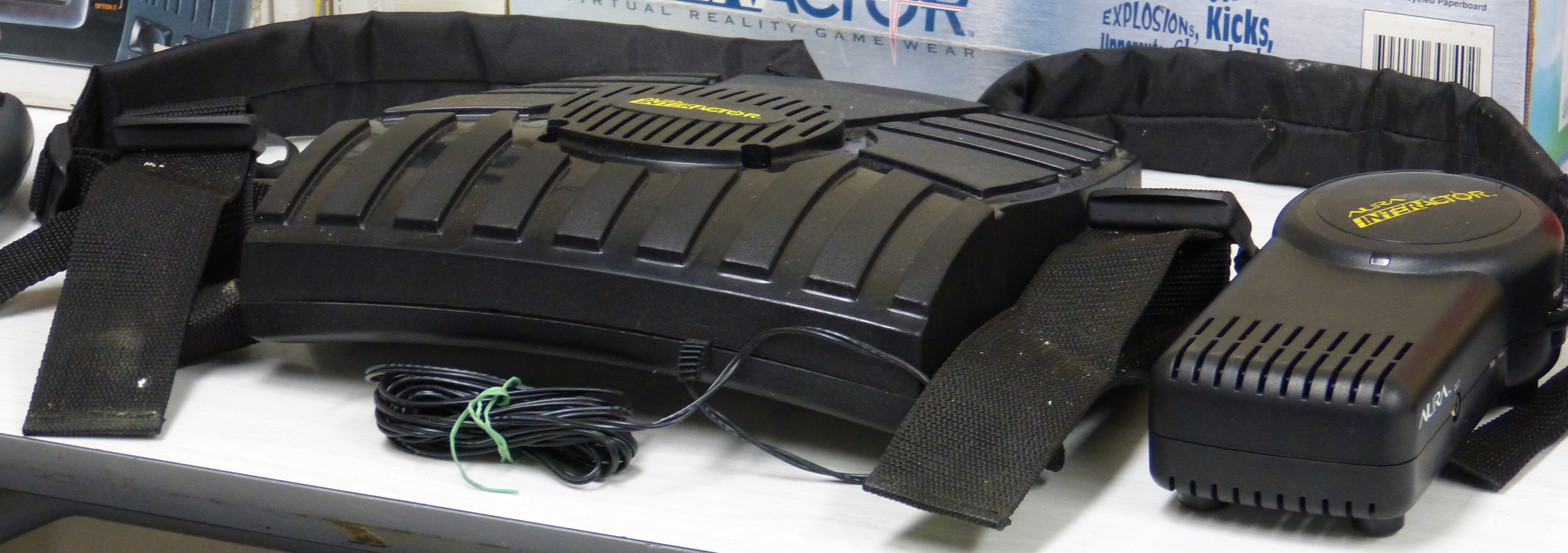
Aura Interactor vest

In 1994 Aura Systems launched the Interactor Vest, conceived by Aura's VP of Audio and Video Technologies, Larry Shultz to feel sound from video games and TV shows. The Interactor was a wearable force-feedback device that would monitor an audio signal and uses Aura's patented electromagnetic actuator technology to convert bass sound waves into vibrations that can represent such actions as a punch or kick. The Interactor vest plugs into the audio output of a stereo, TV, or VCR and the user is provided with controls that allow for adjusting of the intensity of vibration and filtering out of high frequency sounds. The Interactor Vest is worn over the upper torso and the audio signal is reproduced through a speaker embedded in the vest. Sales numbers are unclear, but have numbers as low as 5000 of its Interactor Vest sold in electronics stores. Aura later began shipping the Interactor Cushion, a device which operates like the Vest but, instead of being worn, it is placed against a seat back and the user must lean against it. Both the Vest and the Cushion were launched with a price tag of $99.

=== HugShirt (2002) ===
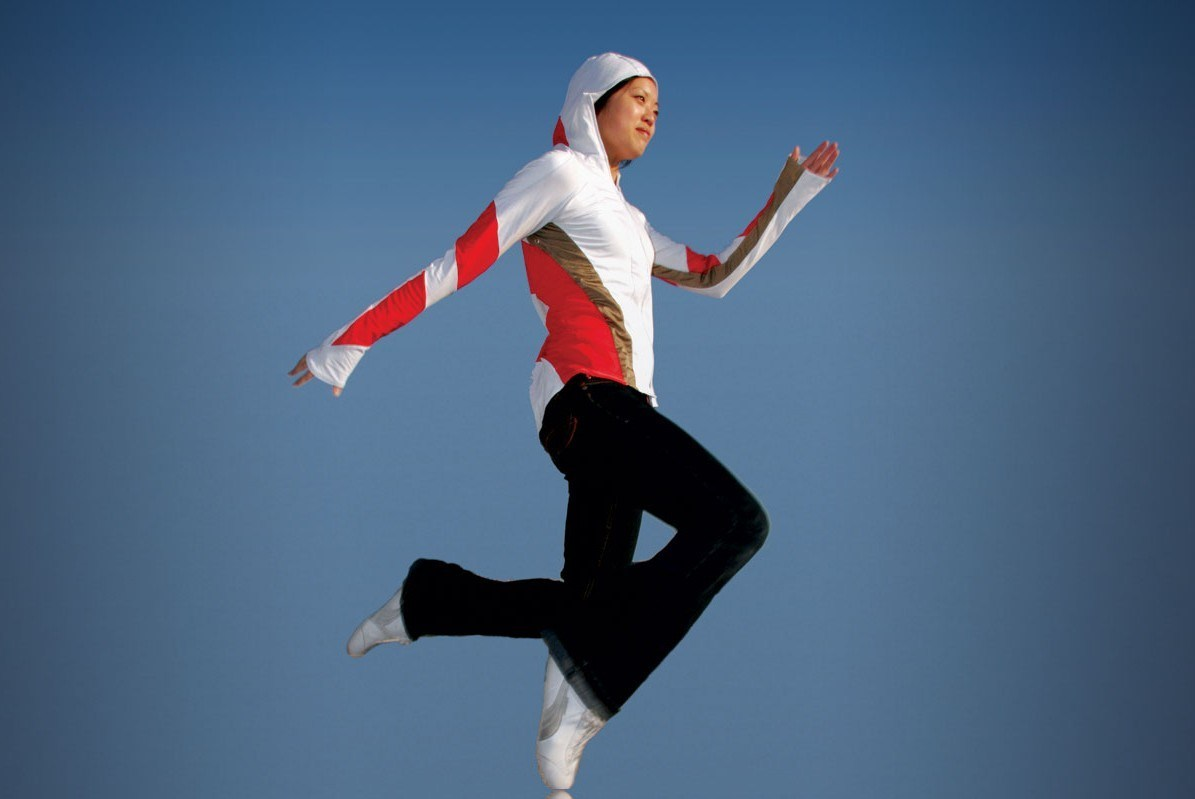
HugShirt (2002) haptic garment for remote touch

In January 2002, Francesca Rosella and Ryan Genz, then researchers at the Interaction Design Institute Ivrea in Italy, designed the HugShirt. The Hugshirt is a wearable haptic telecommunication device that allows a wearer to send the feeling of a hug to a distant loved one. HugShirts feature touch sensors and haptic actuators that work together to capture and recreate touch over distance. Sensor areas placed on the garment capture the touch of the wearer, the data is transferred to their mobile device where the Hug App creates a Hug message that is delivered to the receiving wearer of a second HugShirt in another location across the world. Actuators in the receiving HugShirt recreate the touch that was created by the first wearer. The HugShirt was awarded first prize at the Cyberart Bilbao Festival, and subsequently awarded by Time magazine as one of the best inventions of 2006.

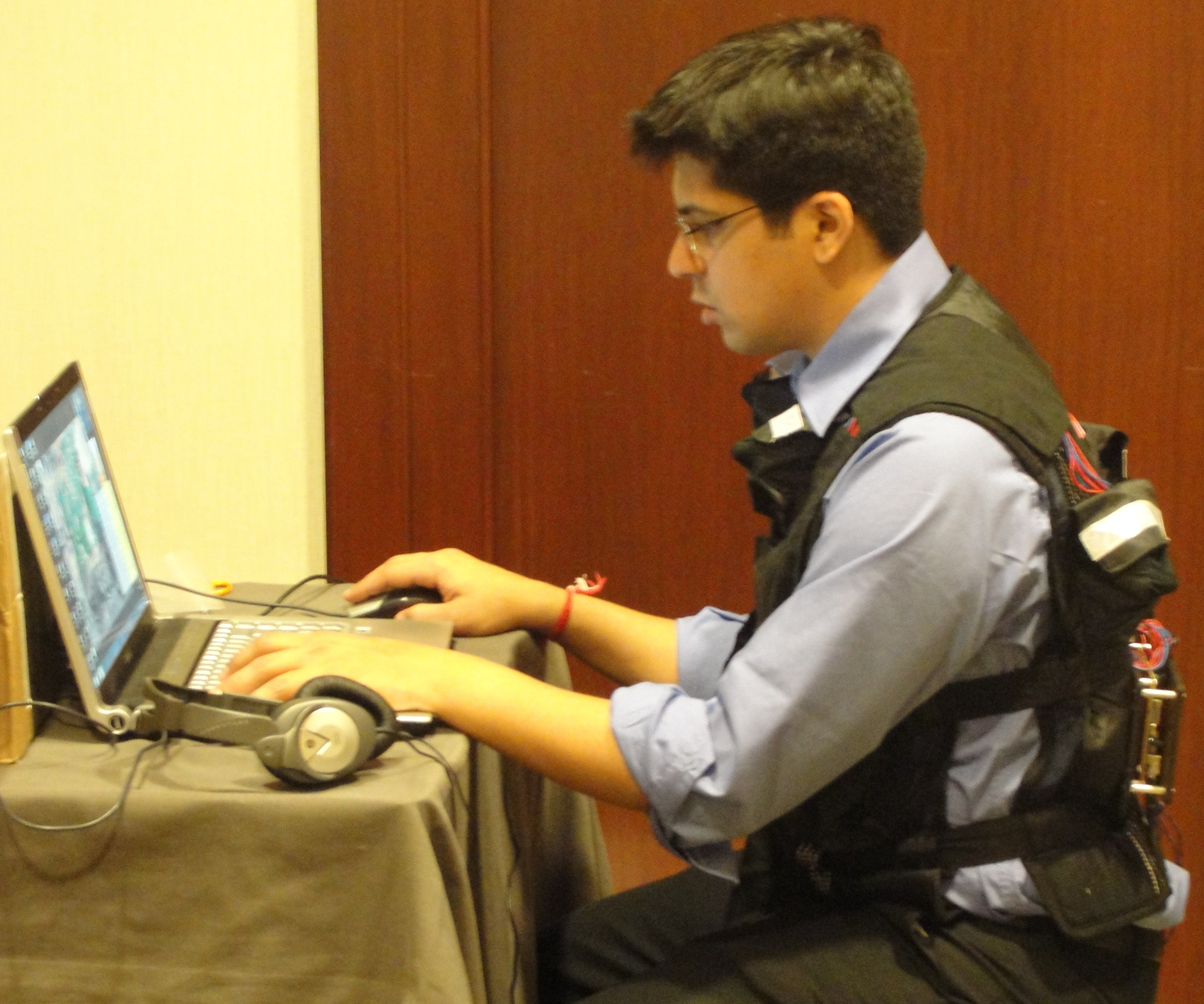
Tactile Gaming Vest

=== Tactile Gaming Vest (2010) ===
In 2010, Saurabh Palan and a team at the University of Pennsylvania developed the Tactile Gaming Vest (TGV), a haptic feedback device designed to increase immersion in first- and third-person shooter games such as Half-Life 2. The vest was presented at the 2010 IEEE Haptics Symposium. It utilized a combination of actuators to simulate different combat sensations: solenoids provided the impact of gunshots, eccentric-mass motors simulated the slashing sensation of a knife, and Thermoelectric heat pumps were intended to generate heat to mimic blood flow or environmental temperatures.

=== SoundShirt (2016) ===
The SoundShirt is a shirt that allows both deaf and hearing audience members to experience music and AR enhanced by touch (haptic) sensations. It was designed by CuteCircuit, the same company behind the HugShirt. The SoundShirt was used for its first performance by the Junge Symphoniker Orchestra in Hamburg, Germany. The shirt maps different musical sounds to haptic sensations on different parts of the body, allowing media to be felt physically during both live and virtual shows. The SoundShirt features 30 haptic multi-force actuators embedded into a garment. The SoundShirt is the winner of the 2019 UNESCO NETEXPLO Innovation award, the Audience of the Future INNOVATE UK Innovation Grant, and was featured on Time magazine's best inventions of 2020 list.

=== bHaptics TactSuit (2017) ===
bHaptics released three products: a vest based on 40 haptic points, a haptic mask, and haptic arm bands (TactSleeves) with 3 haptic points each.

=== Teslasuit ===
The Teslasuit is a full body haptic suit with motion capture and biometric sensors made in 2016. Its haptic feedback system uses electrical muscle stimulation (EMS) and transcutaneous electrical nerve stimulation (TENS) to simulate feelings and sensations.

The use of biometric sensors has proposed uses in medicine and specifically rehabilitation psychology.

According to ABC News, the Teslasuit is so far too expensive to go mainstream.

=== OW-O ===
The OW-O is a rechargeable wireless shirt. It has a mobile app and can be used in video games.

== See also ==
- Media related to Haptic suits at Wikimedia Commons
- Ready Player One
