= Ron Gilbert =

American video game designer

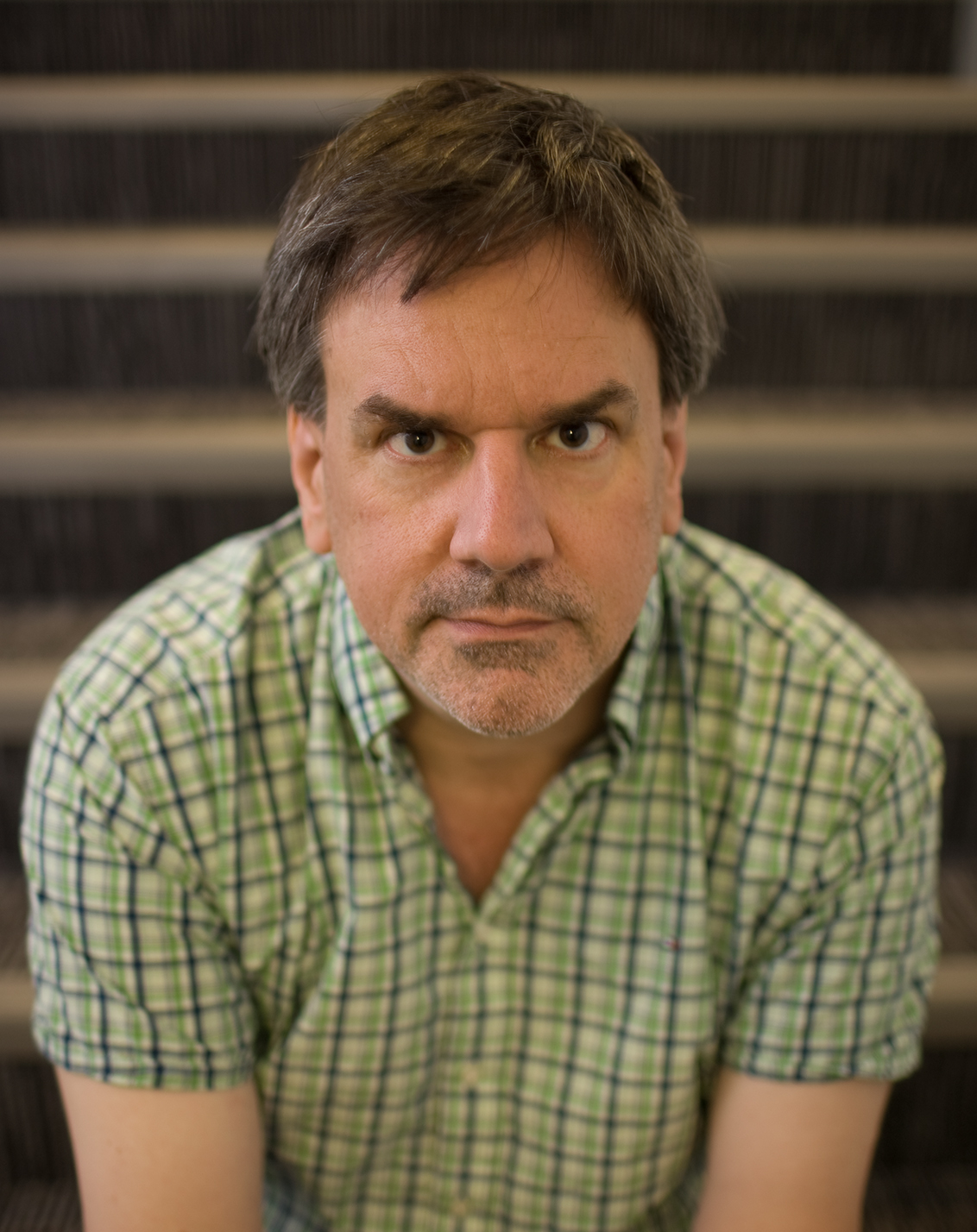
Gilbert in 2013

Ronald David Gilbert (born January 1, 1964) is an American video game designer, programmer, and producer. His games are generally focused on interactive story-telling, and he is arguably best known for his work on several LucasArts adventure games, including Maniac Mansion and the first two Monkey Island games. In 2009, he was chosen by IGN as one of the top 100 game creators of all time.

While a student in 1983, he co-wrote Graphics BASIC, and he then worked on action games for HESware, which went out of business. He afterwards joined Lucasfilm Games (later LucasArts), and was given the opportunity to develop his own games. He invented SCUMM, a technology used in many subsequent games. After leaving LucasArts, Gilbert co-founded the children's gaming company Humongous Entertainment in 1992 and its sister company Cavedog Entertainment in 1995, where he produced games such as Total Annihilation for adults.

He cofounded Hulabee Entertainment with Shelley Day, releasing children's games between 2001 and 2003. After working with Beep Games between 2004 and 2007, he was creative director at Vancouver-based Hothead Games development studio between 2008 and 2010, also doing some work for Telltale Games and with Penny Arcade. In 2013, he announced that he would move on from Double Fine Productions, after releasing the game The Cave with them. In 2017, he announced Thimbleweed Park with Terrible Toybox, serving as writer, designer, and programmer since 2014. In 2022, he returned to the Monkey Island series, co-designing and co-writing Return to Monkey Island.

== Biography ==
=== Early career ===
Ronald David Gilbert was raised in La Grande, Oregon. He is the son of David E. Gilbert, a physics professor and former president of Eastern Oregon University (then Eastern Oregon State College). Initially, he thought of himself going into a career for film direction. He became interested in games when he was thirteen years old, thanks to a HP-65 programmable calculator his father used to bring home. He found the ability to program games on the calculator interesting, citing an example of a Battleship-like game that was included on the calculator, leading him wanting to learn how to program other games. Gilbert saw the potential to program games as a creative outlet as he continued his studies towards the film industry. Another thing that made him approach the gaming world was the film Star Wars (1977). His fascination with programming technology, which allowed gamers to interact with characters and situations, mixed with his love for telling stories, like that of "Star Wars", were his main inspirations to start making games.

The impact of Star Wars and his love for telling stories was so big that Ron Gilbert, at the age of fourteen, and his good friend Tom McFarlane made a couple of films on a Super-8 camera. The first film they shot in 1978 was Stars Blasters; it was directed by Ron Gilbert and acted by McFarlane and friend Frank Lang. In 1979, they filmed another movie, Tomorrow Never Came, acted by Ron Gilbert, Tom McFarlane; it was also directed by Ron Gilbert.

In 1979, his parents purchased a NorthStar Horizon home computer. At the age of fifteen, he took his first steps in game programming. He used to study and analyze games for hours; capturing in his mind every frame of the layout of games like Donkey Kong, Pac-Man, Asteroids, Space Invaders or Robotron: 2084; taking notes of every detail and then trying to replicate them on his computer. Once the games were replicated, he would start doing experiments with them, adding changes. He also used to look at Atari 2600 games' advertisements in magazines, then imagined what the game was like to play and tried to make them on his computer. Once the games were finished, he used to bring his friends home to test the games and tell him what they did or did not like.

=== LucasArts ===
Gilbert began his professional career in 1983 while he was still a student at Eastern Oregon State College by writing a program named Graphics BASIC with Tom McFarlane. They sold the program to a San Francisco Bay Area company named HESware, which later offered Gilbert a job. He spent about half a year at HESware, programming action games for the Commodore 64 (C64). None of them were ever released; the company went out of business. Shortly thereafter, Gilbert joined Lucasfilm Games, which later became LucasArts. There he earned his living by doing C64 ports of Lucasfilm Atari 800 games. In 1985, he got the opportunity to co-develop his own game for LucasArts together with graphics artist Gary Winnick. Maniac Mansion was about a dark Victorian mansion populated by a mad scientist, his family and strange aliens.

Maniac Mansion features cutscenes, a word coined by Gilbert, that interrupt gameplay to advance the story and inform the player about offscreen events. Gilbert created a scripting language that was named after the project it had been written for, the Script Creation Utility for Maniac Mansion, better known as S.C.U.M.M. The technology was used in all subsequent LucasArts adventure games, with the exception of Grim Fandango and Escape From Monkey Island. Despite being an internal production tool, the S.C.U.M.M. acronym became well known to gamers since a location in The Secret of Monkey Island, the SCUMM Bar, was named after it.

Gilbert created many successful adventure games at LucasArts, including the classic The Secret of Monkey Island and Monkey Island 2: LeChuck's Revenge. In 1992, he left the company to start Humongous Entertainment with LucasArts producer Shelley Day. While at Humongous Entertainment, Gilbert was responsible for games such as Putt-Putt, Fatty Bear, Freddi Fish, Pajama Sam, and the Backyard Sports series. Many of these games continued to use an offshoot of the S.C.U.M.M. engine.

=== Post-LucasArts ===
In 1995, Gilbert founded Cavedog Entertainment, Humongous' sister company for non-kids games. In 1996, GameSpot named him as the 15th on their list of the most influential people in computer gaming of all time. In 1997, Computer Gaming World similarly ranked him as number 15 on the list of the most influential people of all time in computer gaming for inventing the S.C.U.M.M. engine. While at Cavedog, Gilbert was the producer of Total Annihilation and worked on a game titled Good & Evil. Widely regarded as his pet project, Good & Evil was said to incorporate many different themes and gameplay styles. The game was previewed by several publications, but the project was cancelled when Cavedog closed down in 1999. In an interview with GameSpot conducted a while after Cavedog's shut-down, Gilbert said the Good & Evil project had suffered due to him trying to design a game and run a company at the same time.

As of 2005, Ron Gilbert was independently designing an unspecified new adventure/RPG, which he was pitching to publishers. He also started a blog "Grumpy Gamer", offering game industry commentary, occasionally in the form of animated cartoons that he created with Voodoo Vince designer Clayton Kauzlaric.

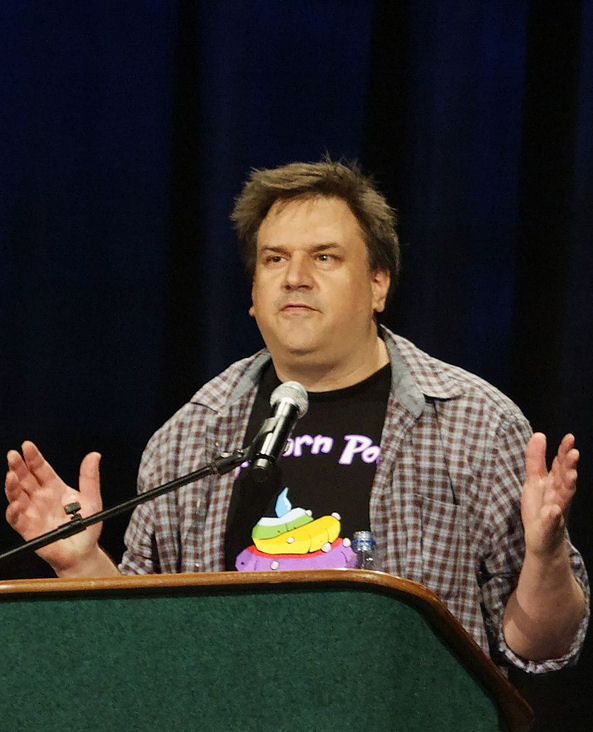
Ron Gilbert at PAX 2009

In 2007, Gilbert created "Threepwood", an exclusively Monkey Island-themed guild on the World of Warcraft server Quel'Dorei, and Gilbert began to collaborate with Hothead Games on Penny Arcade Adventures: On the Rain-Slick Precipice of Darkness, a game based on the webcomic Penny Arcade. He was chosen to be the Keynote Speaker for Penny Arcade Expo for 2009.

In January 2008, he joined Hothead Games as creative director, with whom he was developing DeathSpank, an adventure/R.P.G. Although still working at Hothead Games, Gilbert contributed to the design for Telltale Games' Tales of Monkey Island, taking part in the brainstorming process early in the development of the game. The episodic fifth entry in the Monkey Island series marked the first time Gilbert worked on a Monkey Island game since 1991's LeChuck's Revenge. On April 6, 2010, on his blog he announced that he left Hothead Games but that he would continue to promote DeathSpank with Electronic Arts.

In September 2010, it was revealed that Gilbert had been hired by fellow former LucasArts game designer Tim Schafer, to work at Schafer's own Double Fine Productions. In February 2012, Tim Schafer confirmed he will be working with Ron Gilbert on a new adventure game. In May 2012, the game was revealed as The Cave, which was released as a downloadable title by Sega in 2013.

After the buying of LucasArts by The Walt Disney Company in 2012, the rights to the Monkey Island series became the company's property. Ron Gilbert has been quoted in November 2012 as not being optimistic about the franchise's future, believing that Disney might abandon the franchise in favor of Pirates of the Caribbean; however, in December 2012, he was also quoted as wishing to contact Disney, hoping to "make the game he wants to make".

In March 2013, Gilbert left Double Fine Productions revealing that his joining the studio was purely for the creation of The Cave: "I was telling him [Tim Schafer] about The Cave and he really liked it, so he said 'come to Double Fine and make it'. It was really all about making that game." Most recently he worked on the iOS and Android game Scurvy Scallywags with DeathSpank co-creator Clayton Kauzlaric.

On November 18, 2014, it was revealed that he had reunited with Gary Winnick, with whom he created his early critically acclaimed point-and-click games at LucasArts, and that they were working together on a new point-and-click game called Thimbleweed Park. The game reached its funding target on the crowd sourcing site Kickstarter on December 18 and was released on March 30, 2017, in full "talkie" mode for Windows, Linux, Mac and Xbox One. A port to iOS and Android was confirmed after the project met its last stretch-goal.

On May 23, 2016, Gilbert took to Twitter to express a desire to buy back earlier LucasArts franchises saying "Please sell me my Monkey Island and Maniac Mansion IP. I'll pay actual money for them.". In 2017, fans of the series launched an online petition in support of Ron Gilbert, asking Disney to sell the franchises to him; as of December 2021, the petition has gathered about 29,000 signatures.

On April 4, 2022, Gilbert announced that he had been working on Return to Monkey Island for the prior two years in secrecy. The game was released later that year on September 19, by Devolver Digital and his company Terrible Toybox.

On February 2, 2025, posted on his blog that he was planning to release a new game, titled Death By Scrolling with a view to release it within 2025. Gilbert had earlier blogged about experimenting with an RPG engine and tileset in 2018. Gilbert released the game for PC October 28, 2025

== Games ==
Name	Year	Credited with	Publisher
Koronis Rift	1985	programmer	Lucasfilm Games
Ballblazer	1985	programmer	Lucasfilm Games
Maniac Mansion	1987	writer, director, art and programmer	Lucasfilm Games
Habitat	1987		Lucasfilm Games
PHM Pegasus	1988		Lucasfilm Games
Pipe Dream	1989	writer	Lucasfilm Games
Indiana Jones and the Last Crusade: The Graphic Adventure	1989	writer	Lucasfilm Games
The Secret of Monkey Island	1990	writer and director	Lucasfilm Games
Monkey Island 2: LeChuck's Revenge	1991	director, designer and programmer	LucasArts
Putt-Putt Joins the Parade	1992	director, designer and programmer	Humongous Entertainment
Fatty Bear's Birthday Surprise	1993	director, designer and programmer	Humongous Entertainment
Putt-Putt's Fun Pack	1993		Humongous Entertainment
Maniac Mansion: Day of the Tentacle	1993	writer	LucasArts
Putt-Putt Goes to the Moon	1993	director, designer and programmer	Humongous Entertainment
Fatty Bear's Fun Pack	1993		Humongous Entertainment
Putt Putt & Fatty Bear's Activity Pack	1994		Humongous Entertainment
Freddi Fish and the Case of the Missing Kelp Seeds	1994	producer, designer and programmer	Humongous Entertainment
Let's Explore the Airport	1995		Humongous Entertainment
Let's Explore the Farm	1995		Humongous Entertainment
Let's Explore the Jungle	1995		Humongous Entertainment
Putt-Putt Saves the Zoo	1995	interactive design, producer and programmer	Humongous Entertainment
Freddi Fish 2: The Case of the Haunted Schoolhouse	1996	producer and programmer	Humongous Entertainment
Pajama Sam: No Need to Hide When It's Dark Outside	1996	interactive design, producer and programmer	Humongous Entertainment
Putt-Putt and Pep's Dog on a Stick	1996	programmer	Humongous Entertainment
Putt-Putt and Pep's Balloon-o-Rama	1996	programmer	Humongous Entertainment
Freddi Fish and Luther's Maze Madness	1996	programmer	Humongous Entertainment
Freddi Fish and Luther's Water Worries	1996	programmer	Humongous Entertainment
Big Thinkers 1st Grade	1997	programmer	Humongous Entertainment
Big Thinkers Kindergarten	1997	programmer	Humongous Entertainment
Backyard Baseball	1997		Humongous Entertainment
Total Annihilation	1997	producer	Cavedog Entertainment
Spy Fox in "Dry Cereal"	1997	creative director and programmer	Humongous Entertainment
Putt Putt Travels Through Time	1997	producer and programmer	Humongous Entertainment
Pajama Sam's Sock Works	1997	programmer	Humongous Entertainment
Putt-Putt Enters the Race	1998		Humongous Entertainment
Freddi Fish 3: The Case of the Stolen Conch Shell	1998		Humongous Entertainment
Total Annihilation: The Core Contingency	1998	producer	Cavedog Entertainment
Total Annihilation: Battle Tactics	1998	producer	Cavedog Entertainment
Blue's Birthday Adventure	1998		Humongous Entertainment
Pajama Sam 2: Thunder and Lightning Aren't so Frightening	1998	creative director and programmer	Humongous Entertainment
Pajama Sam's Lost & Found	1998		Humongous Entertainment
Spy Fox in Cheese Chase	1998	programmer	Humongous Entertainment
Backyard Soccer	1999		Humongous Entertainment
Blue's 123 Time Activities	1999		Humongous Entertainment
Blue's ABC Time Activities	1999		Humongous Entertainment
Total Annihilation: Kingdoms	1999	producer	Cavedog Entertainment
Spy Fox in Hold the Mustard	1999		Humongous Entertainment
Blue's Treasure Hunt	1999		Humongous Entertainment
Spy Fox 2: "Some Assembly Required"	1999		Humongous Entertainment
Pajama Sam 3: You Are What You Eat from Your Head to Your Feet	1999		Humongous Entertainment
Backyard Football	1999		Humongous Entertainment
Total Annihilation: Kingdoms – The Iron Plague	2000	producer	Cavedog Entertainment
Blue's Reading Time Activities	2000		Humongous Entertainment
Blue's Art Time Activities	2000		Humongous Entertainment
Freddi Fish's One-Stop Fun Shop	2000		Humongous Entertainment
Pajama Sam's One-Stop Fun Shop	2000		Humongous Entertainment
Putt-Putt's One-Stop Fun Shop	2000		Humongous Entertainment
Backyard Soccer MLS Edition	2000		Humongous Entertainment
Putt-Putt Joins the Circus	2000		Humongous Entertainment
Spy Fox 3: "Operation Ozone"	2001		Humongous Entertainment
Backyard NBA Basketball	2001		Humongous Entertainment
Backyard Football 2002	2001		Humongous Entertainment
Pajama Sam's Games To Play On Any Day	2001		Humongous Entertainment
Moop and Dreadly in the Treasure on Bing Bong Island	2001	creative director and programmer	Hulabee Entertainment
Ollo in the Sunny Valley Fair	2002	creative director and programmer	Hulabee Entertainment
Sonny's Race for the Chocolatey Taste	2002		Hulabee Entertainment
Piglet's Big Game	2003		Hulabee Entertainment
Flying Leo	2005		Beep Games
Zodiac	2006		Beep Games
Four Houses	2006		Beep Games
Realms of Gold	2007		Beep Games
Penny Arcade Adventures: On the Rain-Slick Precipice of Darkness, Episode One	2008	story and design consultant	Hothead Games
Penny Arcade Adventures: On the Rain-Slick Precipice of Darkness, Episode Two	2008	story and design consultant	Hothead Games
Tales of Monkey Island	2009–10	"Visiting Professor of Monkeyology"	Telltale Games
Word Spiral	2010	designer, programmer	Beep Games
DeathSpank	2010	design	Hothead Games
DeathSpank: Thongs of Virtue	2010	design	Hothead Games
The Big Big Castle!	2012	designer, programmer	Beep Games
The Cave	2013	director	Double Fine Productions
Scurvy Scallywags in The Voyage to Discover The Ultimate Sea Shanty	2013		Beep Games
Thimbleweed Park	2017	writer, designer, programmer	Terrible Toybox, Inc.
Delores: A Thimbleweed Park Mini-Adventure	2020	writer, designer, programmer	Terrible Toybox, Inc.
Return to Monkey Island	2022	director, designer, writer	Devolver Digital
Death by Scrolling	2025	director, designer, programmer	Microprose

== Written works ==
- Gilbert, Ron (December 1989). "Why adventure games suck - And What We Can Do About It". Journal of Computer Game Design. 3 (2): 4–7.
