= ScummVM =

Set of game engine recreations

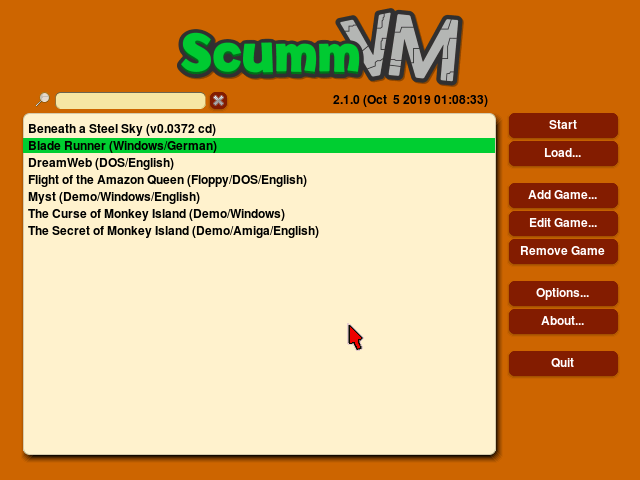
- ScummVM 2.1.0's graphical user interface with the "remastered" skin
- Original authors: Ludvig Strigeus, Vincent Hamm
- Developer: ScummVM Team
- Release: October 8, 2001; 25 years ago
- Stable release: 2026.4.0 / October 11, 2026; 31 days ago
- Written in: C++ and SDL
- Operating system: Cross-platform
- Type: Interpreter
- License: GPL-3.0-or-later
- Website: www.scummvm.org
- Repository: github.com/scummvm/scummvm

Script Creation Utility for Maniac Mansion Virtual Machine (ScummVM) is a set of game engine recreations. Originally designed to play LucasArts adventure games that use the SCUMM system, it also supports a variety of non-SCUMM games by companies like Revolution Software and Adventure Soft. It was originally written by Ludvig Strigeus. ScummVM is free software that is released under the terms of the GNU General Public License.

ScummVM is a re-implementation of the part of the software used to interpret the scripting languages such games used to describe the game world rather than emulating the hardware the games ran on; as such, ScummVM allows the games it supports to be played on platforms other than those for which they were originally released with little or no overhead (due to not emulating the hardware), and without the bugs that might exist in the original software.

The team behind it also add improvements such as bug-fixes and translations and work with commercial companies such as GOG.com about re-releases.

== Features ==
ScummVM is a program that supports numerous adventure game engines via virtual machines, allowing the user to play supported adventure games on their platform of choice. ScummVM provides none of the original assets for the games it supports, and expects the user to properly own the original game's media so as to use the software legally. The official project website offers games that are freeware that work directly with ScummVM. Atop reimplementing the game executables in portable form, ScummVM enables players to save and load the state of the game at any time, enabling a save system atop whatever the reimplemented game may provide. It has also begun to work at providing alternate controls for newer devices, such as mobile devices with touch screens, which work atop the original games.

While ScummVM appears to function equivalently as a game emulator, the ScummVM team does not consider it as such. Outside of some subsystems like audio engines which they are forced to rely on emulation, ScummVM recreates game engines from older languages into more portable C++ code, so that the high-level opcodes in a game's assets will execute in the same manner as their original release, while improving the portability of ScummVM to numerous platforms. The ScummVM team consider this an improvement over simply running the older games and their executables through an operating system emulator, such as DOSBox, since ScummVM's implements are more lightweight and require less processing power and memory, allowing use on more limited processing environments like mobile devices.

=== Ports ===
Portability is a design goal of the project. Ports of ScummVM are available for Microsoft Windows, macOS and a variety of Unix-like systems including Linux (based on RPM, Debian, or source), members of the BSD family (FreeBSD, NetBSD, OpenBSD, DragonFly BSD) and Solaris. It has also been ported to console systems. Less mainstream personal computer ports include those to Amiga, Atari-FreeMiNT, Haiku-BeOS-ZETA, RISC OS, and OS/2 (including derivatives such as ArcaOS).

A variety of game consoles have official ports. ScummVM has been ported to gaming machines such as the PlayStation 2, PlayStation 3, Dreamcast, Nintendo 64, GameCube, and Wii, and to handheld consoles including the GCW Zero, GP2X, Nintendo DS, Pandora, PlayStation Portable and the PS Vita. Handheld computer platforms supported include Palm OS Tapwave Zodiac, Symbian (UIQ platform, Nokia 60, 80, and Nokia 7710 90 phone series), Nokia's Internet Tablet OS (used by the Nokia 770, N800 and N810), Apple's iPhone, MotoMAGX, MotoEZX phones and Windows Mobile. Platforms supported by unofficial ScummVM ports include the Microsoft's Xbox gaming console, BlackBerry PlayBook, Zaurus, Gizmondo and GP32 portable device platforms. Mobile phones running Android, webOS or unofficial Samsung's bada OS are also supported.

== History ==
Work on ScummVM started in September 2001 (with the first public release at October and a site launch at November) by computer science student Ludvig Strigeus. Looking to write his own adventure game, he looked to see how the mechanics of an existing game engine, specifically working to create a way to play Monkey Island 2 on his Linux machine. At about the same time, Vincent Hamm was also looking to implement a SCUMM system player, and though he had done deeper research into understanding how the SCUMM engine worked, found that Strigeus was much further along, and the two joined to craft the project. While Strigeus finished the required implementation for Monkey Island 2, Hamm worked separately to prepare the engine for Indiana Jones and the Fate of Atlantis, and once completed, the two found some dis-coordination on their efforts but eventually got the project working for both games.

News of ScummVM was picked up by the tech news website Slashdot in November 2001, drawing a large interest to the project, and several other developers became part of the project to help support other games. These developers often turned to the creators of the original games to obtain information in informal ways, to help create the reimplementation. Further developers helped to support games that did not use SCUMM, such as Adventure Soft's Simon the Sorcerer; there was some debate about changing the name of the program at this point, but they ultimately kept the ScummVM title, believing that SCUMM was the most well-recognized adventure game engine. Strigeus had built support for iMUSE, the sound software used by many LucasArts games, but feared including it due to potential backlash from LucasArts. Other developers on the project advised him that there should be no legal issues and it was eventually included. Though Strigeus and Hamm would leave the project in 2002, by then it had a large enough development team to allow it to grow, led by James "Ender" Brown. Following this shift, the engine's source code was changed from C to C++, and a graphical user interface (GUI) was added.

With increased awareness of the project, LucasArts sent a cease & desist letter to the project, believing they were using some of LucasArts' proprietary code. Brown worked over the next four years with LucasArts' legal representatives to explain the nature of the project and the source of their information to demonstrate that what they had created was legal. Brown considered that LucasArts was trying to be accommodating as ScummVM helped to raise interest in these titles. They ultimately came to a legal agreement to allow ScummVM to continue to be developed.

The project would also incorporate other parallel efforts to make game reimplementations for other adventure games. Games from Sierra Online were of high demand for the project, requiring them to implement the Adventure Game Interpreter (AGI) and the more advanced Sierra's Creative Interpreter (SCI) engines. AGI support was added in 2006 by incorporating efforts from the Sarien project, but efforts for SCI support were hampered by the parallel project, FreeSCI. Though both ScummVM and FreeSCI aimed to reverse engineer the workings of SCI, FreeSCI had stated that they took a more clean-room approach to avoid any legal question about their reverse engineering, and believed the ScummVM project had run afoul of some of Sierra's approaches and thus were hesitant to work together. However, FreeSCI began to languish in interest compared to ScummVM; after a developer took it upon himself to make the FreeSCI engine work in ScummVM, the FreeSCI saw more participation in their project, and they agreed to merge their efforts into ScummVM. Initial SCI support was subsequently released in a 2010 version of ScummVM.

ScummVM continues to add new games or game engines, though the process to create these is relatively slow. According to the team's project lead Eugene Sandulenko (as of 2017), game engines are chosen for inclusion into ScummVM either if they are given the source code that makes it easy to port into the software's architecture, or if one or more of the team members are passionate about bringing a game engine into the program to do the difficult task of reconstructing the game's code from the compiled versions. Initially ScummVM only included 2D game engines, leaving 3D games to be handled by the sister project ResidualVM, but in 2021 the two projects merged, lifting that restriction. The 2.0 version of ScummVM was released in December 2017, adding support for several full motion video games and some very obscure titles, such as Full Pipe and Plumbers Don't Wear Ties. With this release, ScummVM has support for 64 different game engines.

Since around December 2017, ScummVM had been working support for Macromedia Director in coordination with some of the original developers. Macromedia Director was used for many mid-1990s video games such as The Journeyman Project. By August 2021, the first versions of ScummVM with Director support were released, with the team continuing to work on improving performance.

An attempt to bring in Another World by Éric Chahi brought some internal stress within the project in 2004. Another World was not a point-and-click adventure game, and used polygon-based graphics instead of pixel-based ones most adventure games employ, and thus was considered a serious departure from the focus of ScummVM. Though the project was scrapped in a few days after Chahi requested its removal as he was preparing a 15th anniversary remastered for sale, the current leads of the project had to refocus the group and define the ideals that ScummVM should meet.

ScummVM has also had difficulty in bringing games using the Adventure Game Studio (AGS), which is used frequently in indie adventure games, such as the Blackwell series. While the source code for AGS had been put into the open by its developer Chris Jones in 2010, the ScummVM team was met with a large backlash of complaints from developers using the AGS engine for their games, stating that they did not want to see their games run in ScummVM. Yet eventually a couple of years later AGS was tested in the development build, with a request to the public to beta test thousands of newly supported games, until all AGS v2.5+ games were officially added to the program, coinciding with its 20th anniversary in October 2021.

ScummVM has been a participant in the Google Summer of Code every year since 2007 except for 2015. A sister project, ResidualVM, was started to implement engines for three-dimensional adventure games, such as Grim Fandango and Myst III: Exile, named as such as these games reflect the residual of those not already covered by ScummVM. By late 2020, ResidualVM officially merged with ScummVM. This was completed with the version 2.5 release, coinciding with the program's 20th anniversary in October 2021.

=== Developer support ===
According to Sandulenko "there is no typical process" when it comes to collaboration with developers: "Everything is ad-hoc. What we do, we try to search for contact info of people who were working on the titles some developer is interested in, and we're inquiring access to their original source code, if it still exists somewhere. Then we start working on it at our own pace".

With increased attention, ScummVM has entered into favorable agreements with adventure game developers to help bring their titles into the engine, or in some cases, being given source code and other assets to work from. Revolution Software helped the developers with source code and technical advice for its games, and once ScummVM supported the company's Virtual Theatre engine, Revolution released Lure of the Temptress and Beneath a Steel Sky as freeware and provided assets from its first two Broken Sword games in an open media format. The renewed interest in these games from younger players enabled Revolution to work on two more Broken Sword games. Other developers that have worked closely with ScummVM include:

- Adventure Soft provided the original source code of their adventure games, Simon the Sorcerer, The Feeble Files and Elvira series.
- Alcachofa Soft: Emilio de Paz Aragón released the original source code of the adventure game Drascula: The Vampire Strikes Back as freeware.
- Creative Reality: Neil Dodwell and David Dew from Creative Reality released the original source code for their adventure Dreamweb, and the CD-ROM and floppy disk versions of the game as freeware, available for download on the ScummVM website.
- Gray Design Associates: David P. Gray provided the original source code of the Hugo trilogy.
- Interactive Binary Illusions released both the CD-ROM and the floppy disk version of their adventure game, Flight of the Amazon Queen as freeware available for download on the ScummVM website.
- Laboratorium Komputerowe Avalon: Janusz Wiśniewski and Mirosław Liminowicz released the original source code of their adventure game Sołtys as freeware, available for download on the ScummVM website.
- Perfect Entertainment: John Young, Colin Smythe and Terry Pratchett provided the original source code of their adventure games, Discworld and Discworld II: Missing Presumed...!?.
- Wyrmkeep Entertainment: Joe Pearce provided the original source code of their adventure game, Inherit the Earth: Quest for the Orb.

The digital storefront GOG.com which specializes in selling digital copies of older games, provides support to ScummVM, and sells titles that include the ScummVM engine as part of their distribution. Disney, which owns the rights to LucasArts adventure games, released Maniac Mansion on Steam running off ScummVM.

=== Development ===
Operation Stealth and Future Wars support was added by integrating another stand-alone recreation of their engine: cinE. TrollVM has also been integrated into ScummVM adding support for three pre-AGI games: Mickey's Space Adventure, Troll's Tale, and Winnie the Pooh in the Hundred Acre Wood.

=== Mistic's GPL violations ===
ScummVM is distributed as free software under the GPL-2.0-or-later license, enabling anyone to use the project as an engine for a game. For example, Revolution Software repackaged their Broken Sword games for a DVD release, using ScummVM with the included sword1 and sword2 engines to support modern computers.

In December 2008, the ScummVM team learned that the Wii ports of three Humongous Entertainment Junior Adventure titles (Freddi Fish and the Case of the Missing Kelp Seeds, Pajama Sam: No Need to Hide When It's Dark Outside, and Spy Fox: Dry Cereal) all used the ScummVM engine without proper attribution. The games were published in August 2008 on request of Atari through Majesco, who turned to Mistic Software to port the games. Mistic had used ScummVM for these, but failed to credit the developers. While the ScummVM team contacted gpl-violations.org for legal advice, Atari instead threatened to sue the ScummVM team, as the terms of Nintendo Wii development kit heavily restricted the use of open source software, including the GPL. A settlement was made in 2009, in which ScummVM would drop the investigation of the GPL violation, on the condition that Mistic would sell or destroy all GPL-violating copies of the games, make a donation to the Free Software Foundation, and pay the legal fees.

=== ResidualVM ===
ScummVM
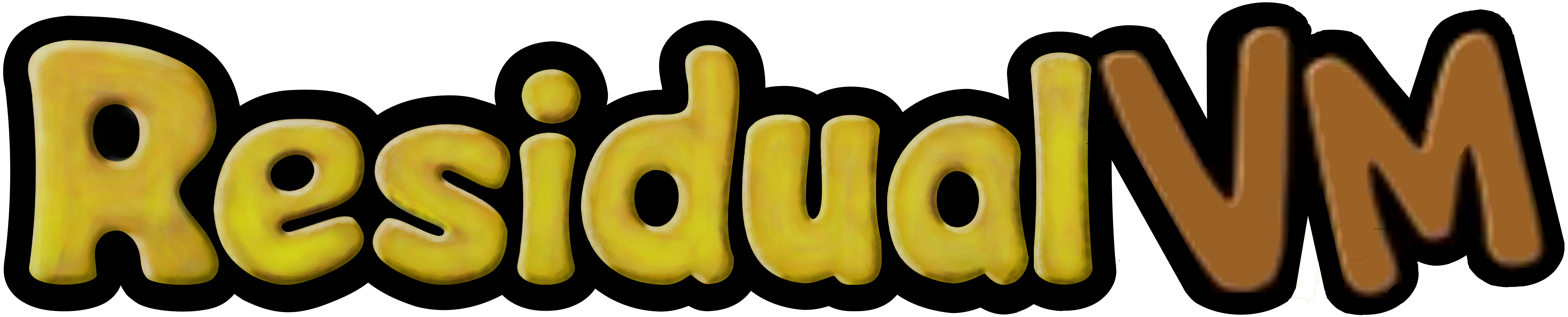
- Original author: James Brown
- Developer: ResidualVM Team
- Release: August 15, 2003; 23 years ago
- Final release: 0.3.1 / June 15, 2018; 8 years ago
- Preview release: 0.4
- Written in: C++
- Operating system: Cross-platform
- Type: Interpreter
- License: GNU General Public License
- Website: www.scummvm.org
- Repository: github.com/scummvm/scummvm

ResidualVM (formerly Residual) was a cross-platform computer program comprising 3D game engine recreations with a common graphical user interface. It supports Grim Fandango, Myst III: Exile, and The Longest Journey. It merged with ScummVM in October 2020.

ResidualVM was originally designed to play LucasArts adventure games that use the GrimE game engine, and was later adapted to support other ones. Like ScummVM, the VM in ResidualVM stood for virtual machine.

ResidualVM is a reimplementation of the part of the software used to interpret the scripting languages by conducting reverse engineering on the original game rather than emulating the hardware on which the games ran. As such, ResidualVM allows the games it supports to be played on platforms other than those for which they were originally released.

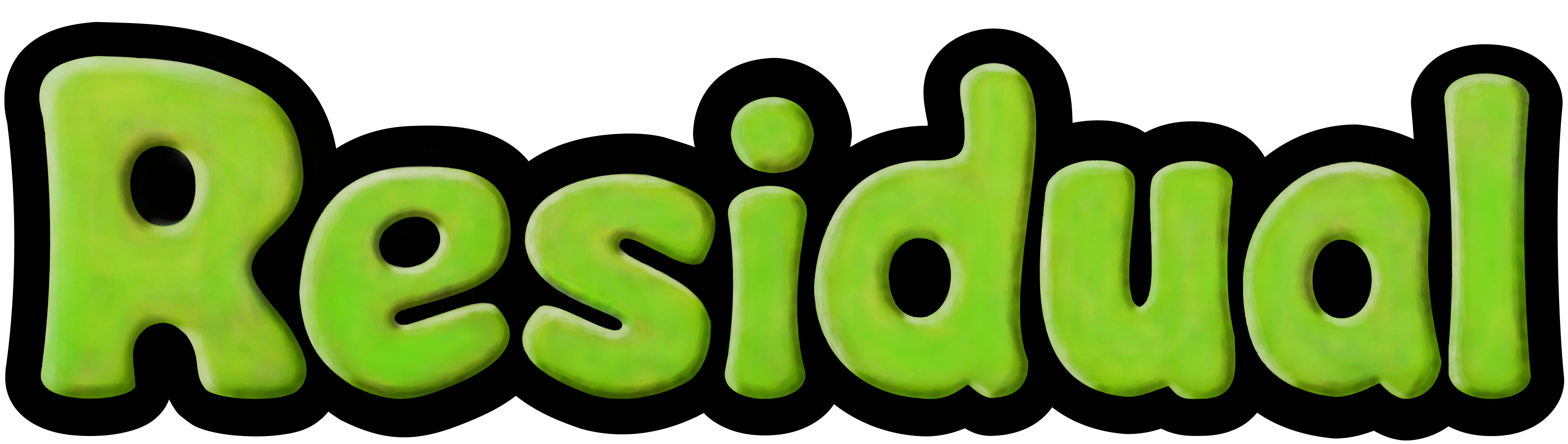
The logo used until July 2009

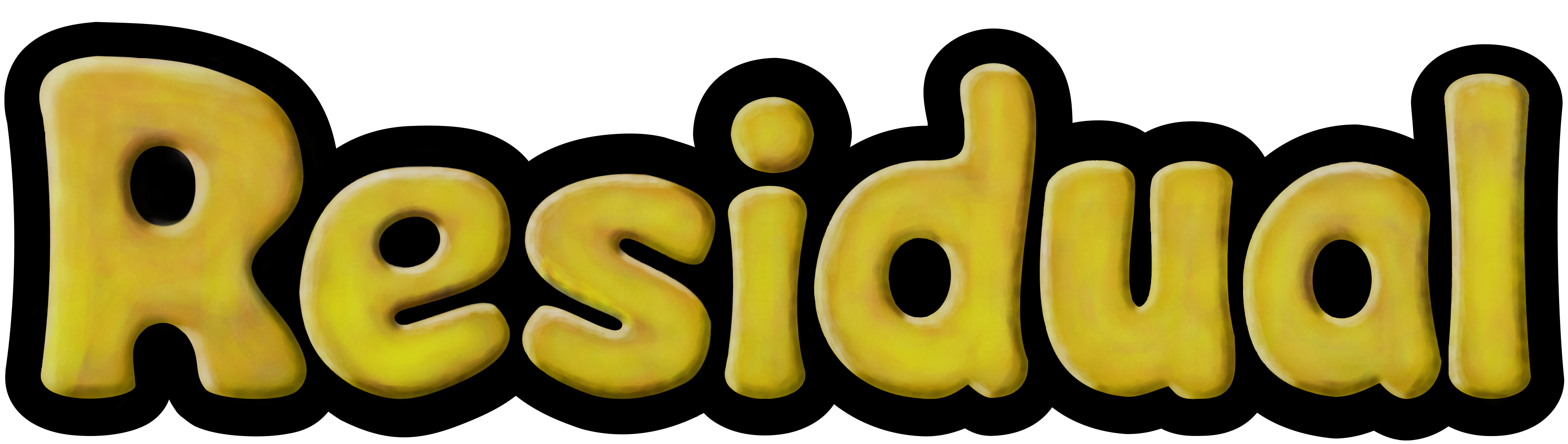
The logo used from July 2009 to January 2012

The name of the project comes from the fact that it was originally started to support the residual LucasArts adventure games not supported by ScummVM. The original Lua-based engine used by LucasArts in their 3D adventure games was called GrimE (as opposed to SCUMM), so ResidualVM's title is also a word pun as grime is a type of residue.

The project was started by former ScummVM team leader James Brown, and was first publicly available on August 15, 2003. Progress on the project was initially slow, and as a result the project's main goal of supporting Grim Fandango did not occur until April 25, 2011, when the compatibility of Grim Fandango was upgraded to "completable with a few minor glitches".

The project obtained a domain separate from ScummVM in December 2011. As a result of the new domain name, the project name was changed from Residual to ResidualVM. The logo was changed to reflect the new name in January 2012. The first stable release of ResidualVM was released 9 years after the project started, on December 21 the same year. It merged with ScummVM in October 2021.

==== Support ====
ResidualVM was officially available on multiple platforms including Windows, Linux, Mac OS X, AmigaOS 4, and IRIX. In addition, an Android port is available in the source code, and unofficial builds have been made with that source. There is also a port available for the Pandora console, and for FreeBSD, but they are not official as they have not been added to the main branch.

With increased attention, ResidualVM entered into favorable agreements with adventure game developers to help bring their titles into the engine. Cyan Worlds partnered with ResidualVM to release Myst III: Exile on digital platforms.

The digital storefront GOG.com which specialized in selling digital copies of older games, sells Myst III: Exile with the ResidualVM engine as part of its distribution.

==== ResidualVM supported games ====
The stable release supports Grim Fandango and Myst III: Exile, which are completable with a few minor glitches.

In the development branch, there is also support for Escape from Monkey Island, which is completable with a few glitches, and The Longest Journey, which is completable with missing features.

Like ScummVM, ResidualVM contains fixes for bugs present in the original executable. The ResidualVM team discovered a workaround for a bug that causes a critical dialog not to play in Grim Fandango. In addition, the Grim Fandango engine in ResidualVM has fixes for over a dozen other bugs present in the original. There is also a branch of ResidualVM called Grim Mouse, which allows Grim Fandango to be played completely with a mouse as a traditional point and click adventure game.

== Supported games ==
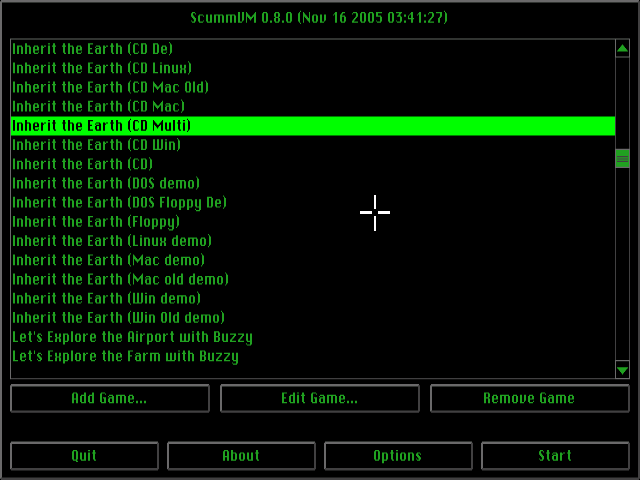
GUI of ScummVM 0.8.0 with the "Classic (builtin)" skin

The following games have support built into the current release of ScummVM.

=== LucasArts games ===
In order of the games' original release dates:

- Maniac Mansion
- Zak McKracken and the Alien Mindbenders
- Indiana Jones and the Last Crusade: The Graphic Adventure
- Loom
- The Secret of Monkey Island
- Monkey Island 2: LeChuck's Revenge
- Indiana Jones and the Fate of Atlantis
- Day of the Tentacle
- Star Wars: Rebel Assault
- Sam & Max Hit the Road
- Full Throttle
- The Dig
- Star Wars: Rebel Assault II: The Hidden Empire
- The Curse of Monkey Island
- Grim Fandango

=== Sierra On-Line games ===
- The Beast Within: A Gabriel Knight Mystery
- The Black Cauldron
- Castle of Dr. Brain
- Codename: ICEMAN
- The Colonel's Bequest
- Conquests of Camelot: The Search for the Grail
- Conquests of the Longbow: The Legend of Robin Hood
- The Dagger of Amon Ra
- Donald Duck's Playground
- EcoQuest: The Search for Cetus
- EcoQuest II: Lost Secret of the Rainforest
- Freddy Pharkas: Frontier Pharmacist
- Gabriel Knight: Sins of the Fathers
- Gold Rush!
- Hi-Res Adventure #0: Mission Asteroid
- Hi-Res Adventure #1: Mystery House
- Hi-Res Adventure #2: Wizard and the Princess
- Hi-Res Adventure #3: Cranston Manor
- Hi-Res Adventure #4: Ulysses and the Golden Fleece
- Hi-Res Adventure #5: Time Zone
- Hi-Res Adventure #6: The Dark Crystal
- Hoyle's Official Book of Games series
- The Island of Dr. Brain
- Jones in the Fast Lane
- King's Quest: Quest for the Crown
- King's Quest II: Romancing the Throne
- King's Quest III: To Heir Is Human
- King's Quest IV: The Perils of Rosella
- King's Quest V: Absence Makes the Heart Go Yonder!
- King's Quest VI: Heir Today, Gone Tomorrow
- King's Quest VII: The Princeless Bride
- King's Questions
- Leisure Suit Larry in the Land of the Lounge Lizards
- Leisure Suit Larry Goes Looking for Love (in Several Wrong Places)
- Leisure Suit Larry III: Passionate Patti in Pursuit of the Pulsating Pectorals
- Leisure Suit Larry 5: Passionate Patti Does a Little Undercover Work
- Leisure Suit Larry 6: Shape Up or Slip Out!
- Leisure Suit Larry: Love for Sail!
- Lighthouse: The Dark Being
- Manhunter: New York
- Manhunter 2: San Francisco
- Mickey's Space Adventure
- Mixed-Up Fairy Tales
- Mixed-Up Mother Goose
- Pepper's Adventures in Time
- Phantasmagoria
- Phantasmagoria II: A Puzzle of Flesh
- Police Quest: In Pursuit of the Death Angel
- Police Quest II: The Vengeance
- Police Quest III: The Kindred
- Police Quest IV: Open Season
- Police Quest: SWAT
- Quest for Glory: So You Want to Be a Hero
- Quest for Glory II: Trial by Fire
- Quest for Glory III: Wages of War
- Quest for Glory IV: Shadows of Darkness
- Rama
- Shivers
- Slater & Charlie Go Camping
- Space Quest: The Sarien Encounter
- Space Quest II: Vohaul's Revenge
- Space Quest III: The Pirates of Pestulon
- Space Quest IV: Roger Wilco and The Time Rippers
- Space Quest V: Roger Wilco – The Next Mutation
- Space Quest 6: Roger Wilco in The Spinal Frontier
- Torin's Passage
- Troll's Tale
- Winnie the Pooh in the Hundred Acre Wood

=== Coktel Vision games ===
- Adibou
- Adibou 2
- Bargon Attack
- The Bizarre Adventures of Woodruff and the Schnibble
- Fascination
- Geisha
- Gobliiins
- Gobliins 2: The Prince Buffoon
- Goblins Quest 3
- Lost in Time
- Once Upon A Time: Little Red Riding Hood
- Playtoons: Bambou le Sauveur de la Jungle
- The Prophecy
- Urban Runner

=== Adventuresoft-Horrorsoft games ===
- Elvira: Mistress of the Dark
- Elvira II: The Jaws of Cerberus
- The Feeble Files
- Personal Nightmare
- Simon the Sorcerer
- Simon the Sorcerer II: The Lion, the Wizard and the Wardrobe
- Simon the Sorcerer's Puzzle Pack
- Waxworks

=== Humongous Entertainment games ===
Various games by Humongous Entertainment use the SCUMM engine, and are therefore playable with ScummVM:

- Backyard Baseball
- Backyard Baseball 2001
- Backyard Baseball 2003
- Backyard Basketball
- Backyard Football
- Backyard Football 2002
- Big Thinkers! First Grade
- Big Thinkers! Kindergarten
- Blue's 123 Time Activities
- Blue's ABC Time Activities
- Blue's Art Time Activities
- Blue's Birthday Adventure
- Blue's Reading Time Activities
- Fatty Bear's Birthday Surprise
- Fatty Bear's Fun Pack
- Freddi Fish and the Case of the Missing Kelp Seeds
- Freddi Fish 2: The Case of the Haunted Schoolhouse
- Freddi Fish 3: The Case of the Stolen Conch Shell
- Freddi Fish 4: The Case of the Hogfish Rustlers of Briny Gulch
- Freddi Fish 5: The Case of the Creature of Coral Cove
- Freddi Fish and Luther's Maze Madness
- Freddi Fish and Luther's Water Worries
- Let's Explore the Airport with Buzzy
- Let's Explore the Farm with Buzzy
- Let's Explore the Jungle with Buzzy
- Moonbase Commander
- Pajama Sam: No Need to Hide When It's Dark Outside
- Pajama Sam 2: Thunder and Lightning Aren't so Frightening
- Pajama Sam 3: You Are What You Eat from Your Head to Your Feet
- Pajama Sam's Lost & Found
- Pajama Sam's Sock Works
- Pajama Sam: Games to Play on Any Day
- Putt-Putt and Pep's Balloon-o-Rama
- Putt-Putt and Pep's Dog on a Stick
- Putt-Putt Enters the Race
- Putt-Putt Goes to the Moon
- Putt-Putt Joins the Circus
- Putt-Putt Joins the Parade
- Putt-Putt Saves the Zoo
- Putt-Putt Travels Through Time
- Putt-Putt's Fun Pack
- Spy Fox in "Dry Cereal"
- Spy Fox 2: "Some Assembly Required"
- Spy Fox 3: "Operation Ozone"
- Spy Fox in Cheese Chase
- Spy Fox in Hold the Mustard

=== Games by other developers ===
ScummVM also supports the following non-SCUMM games:

- 3 Skulls of the Toltecs
- The 7th Guest
- The 11th Hour
- The Adventures of Willy Beamish
- Alfred Pelrock: En Busca de un Sueño
- Alice: An Interactive Museum
- Amazon: Guardians of Eden
- Amerzone
- Another World
- Ape Odyssey No. 2001
- Beavis and Butt-Head in Virtual Stupidity
- Beneath a Steel Sky
- Blade Runner
- Blazing Dragons
- Blue Force
- Broken Sword: The Shadow of the Templars
- Broken Sword II: The Smoking Mirror
- Broken Sword 2.5: The Return of the Templars
- Bud Tucker in Double Trouble
- The Cameron Files: Secret at Loch Ness
- Castle Master
- Chewy: Esc from F5
- Clandestiny
- Classical Cats
- Crime Patrol
- Crime Patrol 2: Drug Wars
- The Crimson Crown
- Cruise for a Corpse
- Crusader: No Remorse
- The Cute Machine
- Darby the Dragon
- The Dark Eye
- Dark Seed
- Dark Side
- Deja Vu
- Deja Vu II: Lost in Las Vegas
- Discworld
- Discworld II: Missing Presumed...!?
- Dracula: Resurrection
- Dracula 2: The Last Sanctuary
- Dragon History
- Dragonsphere
- Dráscula: The Vampire Strikes Back
- DreamWeb
- Driller
- Duckman: The Graphic Adventures of a Private Dick
- Dungeon Master
- Eagle Eye Mysteries
- Eagle Eye Mysteries in London
- Escape from Hell
- Eye of the Beholder
- Eye of the Beholder II: The Legend of Darkmoon
- Faery Tale Adventure II: Halls of the Dead
- Flight of the Amazon Queen
- The Fool's Errand
- Full Pipe
- Future Wars
- Gadget: Invention, Travel, & Adventure
- God of Thunder
- Gregory and the Hot Air Balloon
- The Griffon Legend
- Hanna-Barbera's Cartoon Carnival
- Harvester
- Hades Challenge
- Heart of China
- Hodj 'n' Podj
- Hopkins FBI
- Hugo's House of Horrors
- Hugo II, Whodunit?
- Hugo III, Jungle of Doom!
- Hyperspace Delivery Boy!
- I Have No Mouth, and I Must Scream
- Inherit the Earth: Quest for the Orb
- The Journeyman Project: Pegasus Prime
- The Journeyman Project 2: Buried in Time
- Kingdom: The Far Reaches
- Kult: The Temple of Flying Saucers
- The Labyrinth of Time
- Lands of Lore: The Throne of Chaos
- The Last Bounty Hunter
- The Last Express
- Leather Goddesses of Phobos 2: Gas Pump Girls Meet the Pulsating Inconvenience from Planet X!
- The Legend of Kyrandia: Fables and Fiends
- The Legend of Kyrandia: Hand of Fate
- The Legend of Kyrandia: Malcolm's Revenge
- Little Big Adventure
- Living Books series (Note: Supports all titles up to Stellaluna.)
- The Longest Journey
- Lord Avalot d'Argent
- The Lost Files of Sherlock Holmes: The Case of the Rose Tattoo
- The Lost Files of Sherlock Holmes: The Case of the Serrated Scalpel
- Lure of the Temptress
- L-Zone
- Mad Dog McCree
- Mad Dog II: The Lost Gold
- Magic Tales series
- The Manhole
- Martian Memorandum
- The Messenger
- Might and Magic Book One: The Secret of the Inner Sanctum
- Might and Magic IV: Clouds of Xeen
- Might and Magic V: Darkside of Xeen
- Might and Magic: Swords of Xeen
- Mission Supernova Part 1 and Part 2
- Mortadelo y Filemón: Una Aventura de Cine
- Mortville Manor
- Muppet Treasure Island
- Myst
- Myst III: Exile
- Nancy Drew: Curse of Blackmoor Manor
- Nancy Drew: Danger by Design
- Nancy Drew: Danger on Deception Island
- Nancy Drew: Ghost Dogs of Moon Lake
- Nancy Drew: Last Train to Blue Moon Canyon
- Nancy Drew: Message in a Haunted Mansion
- Nancy Drew: Secret of the Old Clock
- Nancy Drew: Secret of the Scarlet Hand
- Nancy Drew: Secrets Can Kill
- Nancy Drew: Stay Tuned for Danger
- Nancy Drew: The Creature of Kapu Cave
- Nancy Drew: The Final Scene
- Nancy Drew: The Haunted Carousel
- Nancy Drew: The Secret of Shadow Ranch
- Nancy Drew: Treasure in the Royal Tower
- Necronomicon: The Dawning of Darkness
- The Neverhood
- Nightlong: Union City Conspiracy
- Nippon Safes Inc.
- Noctropolis
- Obsidian
- Once Upon a Forest
- Oo-Topos
- Operation Stealth
- Orion Burger
- Penumbra: Overture
- The Pink Panther: Hokus Pokus Pink
- The Pink Panther: Passport to Peril
- Plumbers Don't Wear Ties
- The Prince and the Coward
- Private Eye
- Reah: Face the Unknown
- Red Comrades Save the Galaxy
- Red Comrades 2: For the Great Justice
- Return of the Phantom
- Return to Ringworld
- Return to Zork
- Rex Nebular and the Cosmic Gender Bender
- Ringworld: Revenge of the Patriarch
- Ripley's Believe It or Not!: The Riddle of Master Lu
- Rise of the Dragon
- Riven
- Rodney's Funscreen
- Sanitarium
- Schizm: Mysterious Journey
- Sfinx
- Shadowgate
- Soldier Boyz
- Sołtys
- The Space Bar
- Space Pirates
- Spaceship Warlock
- Spider-Man: The Sinister Six
- Starship Titanic
- Syberia
- Syberia II
- Teenagent
- Tender Loving Care
- Thimbleweed Park
- Tony Tough and the Night of Roasted Moths
- Toonstruck
- Total Eclipse
- Total Eclipse II: The Sphinx Jinx
- Touché: The Adventures of the Fifth Musketeer
- Transylvania
- Treasure of the Silver Lake
- Trick or Treat
- U.F.O.s
- Ultima IV: Quest of the Avatar
- Ultima VI: The False Prophet
- Ultima VIII: Pagan
- Uncle Henry's Playhouse
- Uninvited
- Unrest
- The Vampire Diaries
- Versailles 1685
- Voyeur
- Wetlands
- Who Shot Johnny Rock?
- Wrath of the Gods
- Zork: Grand Inquisitor
- Zork Nemesis
- Several Adventure Game Studio games (Note: Supports games developed with Adventure Game Studio v2.5 or later, both free and commercial.)
- Several Gamos games
- Several interactive fiction games (Note: Supports the following sub-engines of the Glk API: ADRIFT (pre-v5), AdvSys, AGT, Alan2, Alan3, Archetype, Glulx, Hugo, JACL, Level9, Magnetic, Quest, Scott and ZCode (pre-v6).)
- Several qdEngine games
- Several SLUDGE games
- Several Wintermute Engine games
- Several World Builder games

== See also ==
- Game engine recreation
- Z-machine
- Category:ScummVM-supported games
