= Putt-Putt: Pep's Birthday Surprise =

2003 point-and-click adventure game

- Developer: Humongous Entertainment
- Publisher: Atari (Note: The Steam re-release was co-published by Tommo and Nightdive Studios.)
- Producer: Jeff McCrory
- Designers: Eric Gross; Kelle Vozka
- Writer: James "Kibo" Parry
- Composer: The Fat Man
- Series: Putt-Putt
- Platform: Windows
- Release: August 19, 2003
- Genre: Adventure
- Mode: Single-player

Putt-Putt: Pep's Birthday Surprise is a 2003 point-and-click adventure game developed by Humongous Entertainment and published by Atari. In the game, Putt-Putt must gather items to prepare a surprise party for his dog, Pep. The game is the seventh and final installment in the Putt-Putt series, preceded by Putt-Putt Joins the Circus (2000).

The game released for Microsoft Windows on August 19, 2003, the same day as Pajama Sam: Life Is Rough When You Lose Your Stuff, making the two titles Humongous Entertainment's last point-and-click games. Both games are also the only Humongous adventure games to not be produced in the SCUMM engine, instead using Atari's in-house YAGA engine.

The game received positive reviews from critics upon release, with praise for its graphics and child-friendly puzzles. However, retrospective reviews view the game as the weakest of the Putt-Putt series.

== Plot ==
Putt-Putt and Pep return home from a birthday party. Putt-Putt notices that Pep seems upset, and he realizes that Pep has never had a birthday party, as Putt-Putt doesn't know Pep's actual birthdate. When Putt-Putt travels to the feed store to buy more dog food, he mentions this to the owner, Mr. Kibble. Mr. Kibble suggests hosting a surprise party to celebrate the day the two met, which just so happens to be the following day. The suggestion is overheard by Ms. Widget, the owner of the local party store, who tells Putt-Putt that such a party requires a cake, balloons, party decorations, a stage magician, and a gift. Putt-Putt also meets with Mildred, the mail truck, who agrees to send out party invitations.

Throughout the day, the player moves Putt-Putt throughout Cartown to find the five items. Whenever he gets into an interaction involving one of the items, Pep is sent away to preserve the surprise. In the process, Putt-Putt collects ingredients for baker Mrs. Goodbake, string for the balloon-maker Reginald Windbag III, the key to Ms. Widget's store, and the missing hat of Marvin the Magician. He also orders a custom collar and dog tag from Mr. Kibble to serve as Pep's present.

After collecting all five items, Putt-Putt returns home with Pep and sets up the party decorations while Pep is sleeping. The next day, Putt-Putt wakes up Pep, who is surprised and pleased at the party decorations. Putt-Putt opens his garage door, showing that everyone in Cartown has come to the party. As the credits roll, the player is shown pictures of various characters at the party.

== Gameplay ==
The game operates similarly to previous Putt-Putt titles, being a point-and-click game with humorous animations accessible by clicking on certain background elements. A head-up display, styled after Putt-Putt's dashboard, allows the player to view their inventory in Putt-Putt's glove box. Due to the switch from the SCUMM engine to YAGA, some hotkeys, most notably to skip dialogue segments, have been changed.

The game contains three mini-games: one where Putt-Putt retrieves milk from a crowded barn, one where colored eggs are sorted into a carton, and one where rabbits are herded into a magician's hat. These minigames are required to access certain items. Additionally, when retrieving Pep's cake, the player is given the ability to decorate it with letters, shapes, and stickers.

The ability to change Putt-Putt's color, a feature of the series since the first game, does not fully return. Marvin the Magician can change Putt-Putt's color, but the change always reverts before the player can leave the room.

== Development ==
Pep's Birthday Surprise was developed following layoffs by then-Humongous parent Infogrames, which resulted in the game being developed by a smaller team on a lower budget than previous Putt-Putt games. The game reuses some Cartown screen layouts from Putt-Putt Enters the Race and music from Putt-Putt Saves the Zoo, although most of the reused music from Putt-Putt Saves the Zoo are shortened.

Nancy Cartwright, who voiced Putt-Putt in the previous two games, did not return, being replaced by Michele Thorson. Additionally, longtime Putt-Putt writer Laurie Bauman-Arnold did not return, being replaced by James "Kibo" Parry.

== Release ==
Pep's Birthday Surprise and fellow Humongous title Pajama Sam: Life Is Rough When You Lose Your Stuff were previewed by Atari at E3 2003. Both games were released for Microsoft Windows only on August 19, 2003. On June 6, 2014, the game was re-released for Windows on Steam.

Unlike other Putt-Putt games, Pep's Birthday Surprise has not been ported to non-Windows platforms. This is due to the game's YAGA engine not being supported by the ScummVM emulator used to port other Humongous games.

== Reception ==
EdutainingKids.com rated the game A−, describing it as "perfect for children ages 6-7 and great for children ages 3-5 who have some help from parents or older siblings." Common Sense Media rated the game four stars out of five, stating "Kids enjoy playing this because they feel like they are inside a cartoon...Putt-Putt is so polite and thoughtful that he makes a great role model for kids." Metzomagic.com described the game as "a bit simpler than other Humongous games", but "a particularly good game choice for a young first time adventure game player." Children's Technology Review praised the game's graphics and puzzles, but noted that "the little car has a new voice, not quite as endearing as the original." The game was recommended by Parenting magazine and was rated one of 2003's best family games by the Austin American-Statesman.

In a 2019 retrospective on the Putt-Putt series, Hardcore Gaming 101 criticized the game's new engine, the re-use of assets from previous games, and its plot, which was seen as derivative of Fatty Bear's Birthday Surprise. The review concludes that the game "looks like Putt-Putt, but doesn’t quite feel like Putt-Putt" and that "it's hard to recommend, and marks an underwhelming ending for the series."
