= Pajama Sam: No Need to Hide When It's Dark Outside =

1996 video game

- Developer: Humongous Entertainment (Note: Ported to Wii by Mistic Software (Wii) and iOS by Nimbus Games.)
- Publisher: Humongous Entertainment (Note: The Wii version was published by Majesco in the United States and Atari Europe in Europe. The iOS release was published by Atari. The iOS re-release and Android version were published by Tommo. The Steam release was co-published by Tommo and Night Dive Studios. The Nintendo Switch version was published by UFO Interactive Games.)
- Producer: Ron Gilbert
- Designers: Ron Gilbert; Richard Moe; Rhonda Conley
- Artist: Todd Lubsen
- Writer: Dave Grossman
- Composers: Rick Rhodes; Danny Pelfrey; Jeremy Soule
- Series: Pajama Sam
- Engine: SCUMM
- Platforms: Windows, Macintosh, Wii, iOS, Linux, Nintendo Switch, PlayStation 4
- Release: October 4, 1996: Windows, Macintosh October 4, 1996 Wii August 29, 2008 iOS December 12, 2012 Android April 3, 2014 Linux April 17, 2014 Switch February 10, 2022 PlayStation 4 November 3, 2022
- Genre: Adventure
- Mode: Single-player

Pajama Sam: No Need to Hide When It's Dark Outside (also known as Pajama Sam 1) is a 1996 adventure game developed and published by Humongous Entertainment for Microsoft Windows and Macintosh. The first game of the Pajama Sam franchise, it sold nearly three million units and won 50 awards.

The game was first released on October 4, 1996 and reissued on December 7, 1999. In August 2008, the game was re-released for the Wii by Majesco, renamed as Pajama Sam: Don't Fear The Dark and only available for a limited amount of time due to legal problems concerning the port's development. This game was ported to iOS by Nimbus Games under the title Pajama Sam: No Need to Hide in December 2012. A Nintendo Switch version was released in February 2022, followed by the PlayStation 4 version on the PlayStation Store in November.

== Plot ==
A young boy named Sam prepares to go to sleep with his bedroom light off for the first time, but quickly becomes frightened by the darkness. Inspired by the bravery of his superhero idol, Pajama Man, Sam assumes the role of Pajama Sam by donning a red cape and purple mask, imagining Darkness as a living being that he can immobilize with his flashlight and capture in his lunchbox. While searching for Darkness in his closet, Sam falls through a portal and ends up in the Land of Darkness, a world where the sky is always dark.

Not long after Sam enters the Land of Darkness, a group of sentient trees trap him with a rope snare and confiscate his superhero gear, hiding each item in a different location. After Sam frees himself, he befriends a different tree who encourages him to look for his missing items. While exploring the Land of Darkness, Sam meets a boat named Otto, whom he helps overcome his fear of sinking, and a mine cart named King, whom he helps get free from rust, and they both aid him throughout his mission.

After retrieving his lost items, Sam enters Darkness' bedroom and nervously confronts him, only to discover that Darkness isn't a villain, and that he only wants a friend to play with. Feeling sorry for Darkness, Sam befriends him, and they play "Cheese and Crackers" (a variation of tic-tac-toe) together. Afterwards, Sam returns home and goes to bed, having overcome his fear of Darkness.

== Gameplay ==
Like Humongous Entertainment's other games, Pajama Sam uses a point-and-click format. The main goal is to locate Sam's mask, flashlight, and lunchbox, which are all scattered around the Land of Darkness. Alternative paths for Sam's lost items are unlocked when the player beats the game at least once. The player does not have control over which scenarios can be encountered in a playthrough, a feature that becomes available in subsequent sequels. An optional sidequest involves looking for ten pairs of socks belonging to Sam's family, which are hidden throughout various locations. The game also contains a few minigames, some that are optional (such as Nuggets, a Snake-like mine cart arcade game) and some that are mandatory (such as The Brain Tickler, a quiz game show which allows Sam to enter Darkness' basement upon completion).

== Development ==
Pajama Sam was shown at the 1996 Electronic Entertainment Expo (E3) in June. A writer for Computer Games Strategy Plus noted that the character of Sam was "conceived as a pumpkin, [but ...] underwent design changes and now sports a realistic green head as he sets out with his PJ's, blankie, lunchbox and flashlight". This is alluded to within the game in an animated cutaway where Sam reads a journal in Darkness' library regarding a possible lawsuit by an Atlanta executive and concerns about lower game sales due to seasonality. The original pumpkin-head character design was later referenced in the third installment, Pajama Sam 3: You Are What You Eat from Your Head to Your Feet, where Sam must wear a hollowed-out jack-o-lantern over his head to gain access to a restricted area.

== Reception ==
Reception

Review scores
Publication	Score
Adventure Gamers	4/5
1UP.com	B+
Coming Soon Magazine	92%
The Electric Playground	9.5/10
Unikgamer	8/10
PC Magazine	5/5

The original release of Pajama Sam received general acclaim, getting scores of 92% from Coming Soon Magazine, 9.5 out of 10 from Electric Playground, 8/10 from Unikgamer, 4 out of 5 stars from Allgame and 4 out of 5 stars from Adventure Gamers.

The 2008 Wii port, titled Pajama Sam: Don't Fear the Dark was praised for the ease of play with the Wii Remote, but the save-game framework was criticized for looking ugly and for autosaving at inopportune times, including overwriting save files after the player had passed a point of no return.

== Legacy ==
Pajama Sam: No Need to Hide When It's Dark Outside spawned three sequels. The first, Pajama Sam 2: Thunder and Lightning Aren't so Frightening, was released in 1998. In 2000, Pajama Sam 3: You Are What You Eat from Your Head to Your Feet was released, and was the final game with Pamela Segall Adlon voicing Pajama Sam. After Humongous Entertainment was purchased by Atari, Pajama Sam: Life Is Rough When You Lose Your Stuff! was released in 2003. The success of the game also resulted in a number of children's books being released between 1999 and 2001.
