= Pajama Sam: Life Is Rough When You Lose Your Stuff! =

2003 point-and-click adventure game

- Developer: Humongous Entertainment
- Publisher: Atari (Note: The Steam release was co-published by Tommo and Night Dive Studios.)
- Producer: Jeff McCrory
- Designers: Rhonda Conley; Eric Gross
- Artist: John Michaud (animator)
- Writer: James 'Kibo' Parry
- Composer: Nathan Rosenberg
- Series: Pajama Sam
- Engine: YAGA
- Platform: Microsoft Windows
- Release: 2003
- Genre: Adventure
- Mode: Single-player

Pajama Sam: Life Is Rough When You Lose Your Stuff! (also known as Pajama Sam 4) is a 2003 point-and-click adventure game developed by Humongous Entertainment and published by Atari. In the game, Pajama Sam ventures into a land of junk to retrieve a missing comic book. The game is the fourth and final installment in the Pajama Sam series, preceded by Pajama Sam 3: You Are What You Eat from Your Head to Your Feet (2000).

The game released for Microsoft Windows on August 19, 2003, the same day as Putt-Putt: Pep's Birthday Surprise, making the two titles Humongous Entertainment's last point-and-click games. Both games are also the only Humongous adventure games to not be produced in the SCUMM engine, instead using Atari's in-house YAGA engine.

The game received positive reviews from critics upon release, though many noted it as a step down from previous Pajama Sam titles.

== Plot ==
While watching television, Sam sees a breaking news story announcing that Pajama Man is coming to the local shopping mall to sign autographs. After his mother agrees to take him to the mall, Sam decides to get his copy of the first comic book in the Pajama Man franchise signed, only for it to be stolen from a pile of dirty clothes. After finding his cape, Sam leaps into the pile and lands in a world filled with junk.

Sam encounters a dirty sock, who was banished from his drawer and separated from his matching sock due to his filth; he reveals that the person who stole the comic intends to take it to the Grubby Corners Mall get it signed by Dr. Grime, Pajama Man's unclean arch nemesis, much to Sam's horror. After obtaining clothes to pass the mall's dress code, Sam enters the mall to look for his comic book.

In the mall, Sam is mistaken for Dr. Grime by a group of children and hides in Grime's dressing room, where he finds his comic book, only to realize that he's covered in dirt. Hatching a plan to get himself clean, Sam uses the heat from a cup of hot cocoa to set off a sprinkler, flooding the mall in the process. Afterwards, Sam reiterates his plan to get his comic book signed by Pajama Man. A photo of Sam standing with Pajama Man is then shown before the credits roll.

== Development ==
=== Soundtrack ===
The score was composed and produced by Nathan Rosenberg (The Doghouse NYC Studios). Much time and funds were invested in the music composition to accompany the gameplay. Latin was the desired genre for the game with over 45 minutes of soundtrack and optimum quality using real instruments. The solution to retain quality, time and budget was hiring drummer John Bollinger who used a number of syncing techniques to get the music just right. After two days of composing several soundtracks, saxophonist Tom Glusac was hired to add finishing touches to the soundtrack. Thus all the audio for the game was delivered just in time and under the budget.

== Release ==
Life is Rough When You Lose Your Stuff and fellow Humongous title Putt-Putt: Pep's Birthday Surprise were previewed by Atari at E3 2003. Both games were released for Microsoft Windows only on August 19, 2003. On May 29, 2014, the game was re-released for Windows on Steam.

Unlike other Pajama Sam games, Life is Rough When You Lose Your Stuff has not been ported to non-Windows platforms. This is due to the game's YAGA engine not being supported by the ScummVM emulator used to port other Humongous games.

== Reception ==
Reception

Review scores
Publication	Score
USA Today	4/5
Quandary	4.5/5

Award
Publication	Award
Parents' Choice Award	Silver Honor

USA Today provided a positive review of Pajama Sam: Life is Rough When You Lose Your Stuff!, but described the game as being worse and less polished than its predecessors. The game received the Silver Honor award from the Parents' Choice Awards.

In contrast, the game was criticized by the Associated Press, which stated "The premise is good...but the execution, long a Pajama Sam strength, is not up to standards."

== See also ==
- Humongous Entertainment
- Pajama Sam
