= Junior Field Trips =

- Genres: Adventure, edutainment
- Developer: Humongous Entertainment
- Publisher: Humongous Entertainment (Note: The Steam release was co-published by Tommo and Night Dive Studios.)
- Creator: Ron Gilbert
- Platforms: Windows, Macintosh
- First release: Let's Explore the Farm (originally titled Junior Encyclopedias: The Farm); October 1994
- Latest release: Let's Explore the Jungle; November 1995

The Junior Field Trips series is a trilogy of point-and-click children's computer and video games released by Humongous Entertainment in conjunction with Random House. These games (in general) offered virtual tours of particular locations related to their theme, and included a game suite with virtual coloring pages, a scavenger hunt, and various other games depending upon the title. They were originally released for Windows and Macintosh computers, but were re-released via Steam in April 2015. These games were written using the SCUMM engine and can thus be played on additional platforms by using ScummVM.

The series was hosted by "Buzzy the Knowledge Bug" (voiced by Jim Cissell), a blue anthropomorphic insect who provides feedback on the locations when called upon and provided narration for each of the games. The Farm and Airport titles were written by the noted programmer Deborah Todd.

== Games ==
=== Let's Explore the Farm ===
The first game was originally released on November 22, 1994 under the "Junior Encyclopedias" brand, with an updated version released on July 27, 1995, alongside Let's Explore the Airport that revamped the user interface and added mini-games. Players visit a mixed farm and can explore the barn, animals, and crops. Available areas include a farmhouse, crop fields, an orchard, a chicken coop, and a duck pond. The farm has all of the activities and processes of a real, working farm. This includes milking a cow, collecting eggs from hens, harvesting corn, and more. Fact sheets about all the farm animals, plants, farm staff, and pieces of equipment are available. Mini-games (in Let's Explore only) include trivia, spelling quizzes, a coloring book, and an egg catching game.

=== Let's Explore the Jungle ===
The third title was released on November 15, 1995. Players visit three different types of rainforests: South American, African, and Southeast Asian. Fact sheets about animal types and behavior, plants, places, and geographical objects are available. Mini-games include trivia, letter jumble, object finding, a coloring book, and an anteater feeding game.

== Accolades ==
Reception

Awards
| Publication | Award |
|---|---|
| Child Magazine | 1996 Best of the Year Award |
| Parenting Magazine | Software Magic Award |
| Family PC | Tested and Recommended Award |
| Family Channel | Seal of Quality Award |
| Coalition for Quality | Children's Media Award |
| National Parenting Center | Seal of Approval |

== See also ==
- Humongous Entertainment
- ScummVM
