= Big Thinkers =

Big Thinkers may refer to:

- Big Thinkers (TV series)
- Big Thinkers (video game series)
