= Blue's Treasure Hunt =

1999 video game

- Developer: Humongous Entertainment
- Publisher: Humongous Entertainment
- Series: Blue's Clues
- Engine: SCUMM
- Release: September 7, 1999
- Genre: Educational video game
- Mode: Single-player

Blue's Treasure Hunt is a 1999 educational video game developed and published by Humongous Entertainment, based on the Blue's Clues television series, specifically the episode "Blue's Big Treasure Hunt".

== Plot and gameplay ==
The premise of the game revolves around a treasure hunt, where the player helps Blue and her owner Steve find hidden objects. The gameplay involves a point-and-click adventure game interface.

== Commercial performance ==
According to PC Data, the game was the 9th Top Selling Home Education software for the week of 5/28/2000-6/3/2000. The game's interface and other attributes generally received praise.
