= Unrest (video game) =

2014 video game

- Developer: Pyrodactyl Games
- Publisher: Pyrodactyl Games
- Platforms: Microsoft Windows, Mac OS X, Linux
- Release: July 23, 2014
- Genre: Role-playing
- Mode: Single-player

Unrest is a role-playing video game created by the independent development studio Pyrodactyl Games (based in Jaipur, India). The game is notable for being one of the first commercial RPGs to take place in Ancient India. The game was released on Microsoft Windows, Mac OS X, and Linux platforms on July 23, 2014.

== Gameplay ==
Unrest is a role-playing video game. It plays in a 2-dimensional perspective, with graphics designed to look hand-drawn. A large portion of the game involves making dialogue choices to influence NPCs and progress the story. NPCs all possess and react based on three values: Friendship, Respect, and Fear.

Combat is relatively rare, always avoidable, and very risky. However, playable character death does not result in a Game Over. Instead, the game proceeds to the next chapter, with the previous playable character's death influencing how the story ultimately plays out.

== Plot ==
The game takes place in ancient India in a time of great social upheaval. It also contains some fantasy elements, such as the Naga, a race of snakelike humanoids.

The game's story is divided into eight chapters, with players taking on the role of five different characters, who each have their own back story. The playable characters include a peasant girl who doesn't want to go through her arranged marriage, an elderly priest, the chief of the mercenary guild, and the sole heir of the former royal family who now lives as a street urchin.

== Development ==
The developers posted the game on Kickstarter. The campaign started with an initial goal of US$3,000 to finish the game. On the second day of the campaign, the goal had been met. The developers included stretch goals in the campaign which included enhancing the visuals and additional chapters. The campaign ended on June 21, 2013, with Unrest raising $36,251.

== Reception ==
Reception

Aggregate score
Aggregator	Score
Metacritic	65/100

Review scores
Publication	Score
GamesMaster	80%
GameSpot	6/10
Hyper	5/10
PC Gamer (UK)	60%
RPGamer	3.5/5
Common Sense Media	3/5
National Post	6/10

Unrest received "mixed" reviews according to the review aggregation website Metacritic.

Hardcore Gamer gave it a score of three-and-a-half stars out of five and called it "a choice-driven RPG with little combat to speak of that touches on relevant social issues." National Post gave it six out of ten and called it "a bold, powerful, and interesting game. I'm just not sure how much fun it is." Common Sense Media also gave it three stars out of five and said, "There's plenty to admire about this daring, story-driven RPG experience, but it's not quite as accessible or polished as one might have hoped." Paste gave it a similar score of six out of ten and said, "For a game that sets out with intent to include elements rarely embraced in games, Unrest comes across as an underwhelming mixture of a smartly constructed core without any layers to complement it."

== Legacy ==
On August 3, 2020, Arvind Raja Yadav from Pyrodactyl Games released the source code for the game under the MIT License on GitHub. In the summer of 2023, Kartik Agarwala implemented the CRAB engine in ScummVM during Google Summer of Code 2023 to implement support for Unrest. Official support was enabled with the release of ScummVM 2.9.0.
