= Putt-Putt Joins the Circus =

2000 point-and-click adventure game

- 2002 cover art
- Developer: Humongous Entertainment
- Publisher: Humongous Entertainment (Note: The iOS release was published by Tommo. The Steam release was co-published by Tommo and Night Dive Studios.)
- Programmer: Brian Pulliam
- Artist: Edward Pun
- Composer: Scott Lloyd Shelly
- Series: Putt-Putt
- Engine: SCUMM
- Platforms: Macintosh, Windows, iOS, Linux
- Release: Macintosh, Windows; July 11, 2000 iOS; October 4, 2013; Linux; May 29, 2014
- Genre: Adventure
- Mode: Single-player

Putt-Putt Joins the Circus is a 2000 point-and-click adventure game developed and published by Humongous Entertainment under its Junior Adventures label. In the game, Putt-Putt must help the five performers of B.J. Sweeney's Big Top Circus prepare for a show.

The game is the sixth installment in the Putt-Putt series, being preceded by Putt-Putt Enters the Race in 1999 and followed by Putt-Putt: Pep's Birthday Surprise in 2003.

The game was released on July 11, 2000 for Microsoft Windows and Macintosh OS. It has since been re-released on Steam and ported to Linux, iOS, and Android.

== Plot ==
Putt-Putt and Pep are traveling to Apple Valley to see B.J. Sweeney's Big Top Circus. On the way, they find a hungry goat blocking the road to Apple Valley, as well as the train tracks where a train named Roll-Along Cassidy is trying to deliver sawdust to the circus. Putt-Putt coaxes the goat off of the tracks with a flower bush, but the goat eats his circus ticket afterwards. Realizing their predicament, Cassidy decides to give Putt-Putt and Pep a ride to the circus, saying that B.J. Sweeney might be able to help them.

Upon arriving at the circus, Putt-Putt learns from B.J. that all of the circus' acts are having problems. He shows Putt-Putt a piece of paper, showing the performers of the five main performers: Honko the Clown, The Flying Porkowskis, Phillipe the Flea, Reginald the Lion and Katie Cannonball. Putt-Putt volunteers to help around the circus, which Sweeny agrees to.

After Putt-Putt helps all the acts, B.J. Sweeney rewards Putt-Putt by letting him perform in the circus. At the end, Putt-Putt presses a button that opens a curtain, and all the five main circus stars perform their tricks, ending the game.

== Gameplay ==
Putt-Putt Joins the Circus uses the same mechanics as its predecessors including Putt-Putt's dashboard interface and some minigames included. Throughout the game the player must solve characters' problems and unite all five circus actors.

== Development ==
All backgrounds, characters and animations were hand drawn. Between May 11 and 13, 2000, the game had debuted at E3 in Los Angeles.

== Reception ==
=== Critical reception ===
Reception

Review score
Publication	Score
PC Magazine	4/5

Awards
Publication	Award
Dr. Toy, Institute for Childhood Resources	10 Best Software/CD-ROM/High-Tech Products for 2000
Dr. Toy, Institute for Childhood Resources	100 Best Children's Products for 2000
National Parenting Publications Awards	Gold Award
Parent's Guide	Children's Media Award
Children's Software Revue	All Star Software Award
Choosing Children's Software	Best Picks Award

Putt-Putt Joins the Circus was well received and earned a number of awards around its year of release.

=== Commercial performance ===
During the year 2001 alone, Putt-Putt Joins the Circus sold 82,400 retail units in North America, according to PC Data.
