= Let's Explore the Airport =

Let's Explore The Airport
- Developer: Humongous Entertainment
- Publisher: Humongous Entertainment
- Platforms: Windows; Macintosh
- Release: July 27, 1995

Let's Explore The Airport, also known as Junior Field Trips: Let's Explore the Airport, is a 1995 educational video game developed and published by Humongous Entertainment. It was released on July 27, 1995.

== Gameplay ==
The player explores an airport across more than 40 interactive screens, engaging in activities such as guiding luggage into the correct chutes, completing scavenger hunts by locating specific objects or people, matching pictures with names, and coloring numerous scenes. The luggage game requires the player to direct bags through chutes until they reach the proper destination, with some stages allowing only observation until the baggage emerges so it can be dumped into a bin. Hot spots on each screen trigger small animations, like crewmen jumping or a superhero holding up a plane's wheel, and clicking items leads the player to a glossary containing definitions, pictures, and linked terms.

== Reception ==
Reception

Review score
| Publication | Score |
|---|---|
| All Game Guide | 4.5/5 |

CNET called Let's Explore The Airport not up to Humongous's usual top-flight standards. All Game Guide recommended Let's Explore The Airport to kids and their parents.

Let's Explore The Airport was named one of the top 100 CD-ROMs by PC Magazine.

== Awards ==
Let's Explore The Airport won three awards. It won the 1996 Kids First Award from Coalition for Quality Children's Media, the 1997 Best Development Software Award from Early Childhood Education Journal, and the 1996 Best of the Year Award from Child magazine.
