= Pajama Sam =

- Pajama Sam, the title character of the game series
- Genres: Adventure, edutainment
- Developer: Humongous Entertainment
- Publishers: Humongous Entertainment; Atari; Infogrames
- Creators: Ron Gilbert; Rich Moe; Rhonda Conley
- Platforms: Windows, Macintosh, iOS, Android, Linux, PlayStation, Wii, Nintendo Switch, PlayStation 4
- First release: Pajama Sam: No Need to Hide When It's Dark Outside; October 18, 1996
- Latest release: Pajama Sam: Life Is Rough When You Lose Your Stuff! October 14, 2003

The Pajama Sam series is a series of point-and-click adventure games and puzzle video games aimed towards children originally created by Humongous Entertainment. Pamela Adlon voices the title character in all games, excluding the first spin-off game and the final entry.

== Games ==
All games consist of multiple parts: an introductory phase in which Sam begins in one room of his house, entering an imaginary world through some dark space in his house, the actual journey he undertakes in that world, and a concluding cinematic that ends the story. While Sam is in the imaginary world, he can move from one screen to another and interact with the environment with point-and-click controls. Different areas feature important items and non-playable characters that can be collected or interacted with. Each area also features clickpoints that play animations that occasionally feature crossover cameos of other Humongous Entertainment characters. Some items or areas are inaccessible due to an obstacle that is usually overcome by finding and using another item. The obstacles Sam faces and the methods by which he is to progress to the main goal are determined at random at the beginning of a playthrough, and playthroughs in progress can be saved and continued at a later time. In addition to the main storyline, each game features hidden optional collectible items scattered in the world, with a special reward available to those who can find them all.

In the first game, the player had no control over what scenarios would be encountered in one playthrough. In the sequel, the player can choose from several combinations of scenarios to play with, and in the third game, the player is given complete control on what kind of scenarios are encountered for each step towards resolving the main conflict.

The third title was ported to the original PlayStation. More than a decade since the series' inception, the first game in the series was also ported to the Wii, which suffered from limited availability due to a legal conflict concerning its development. In the 2010s, the first three games of the series were ported to iOS and Android as paid games.

Adventure Games
Title	Release date	Platforms
Pajama Sam: No Need to Hide When It's Dark Outside; Pajama Sam: Don't Fear The Dark (Wii); Pajama Sam: No Need to Hide (iOS)	October 18, 1996 (Macintosh, Microsoft Windows); August 29, 2008 (Wii); December 12, 2012 (iOS); April 17, 2014 (Linux); February 10, 2022 (Nintendo Switch); November 3, 2022 (PlayStation 4)	iOS, Macintosh, Microsoft Windows, Nintendo Switch, PlayStation 4, Wii
Pajama Sam 2: Thunder and Lightning Aren't so Frightening; Pajama Sam 2 (iOS)	July 1998 (Macintosh, Microsoft Windows); April 5, 2012 (iOS); April 3, 2014 (Android); May 1, 2014 (Linux); February 10, 2022 (Nintendo Switch); November 3, 2022 (PlayStation 4)	Android, iOS, Macintosh, Microsoft Windows, Nintendo Switch, PlayStation 4
Pajama Sam 3: You Are What You Eat from Your Head to Your Feet; Pajama Sam: You Are What You Eat from Your Head to Your Feet (PlayStation); Pajama Sam 3 (iOS)	April 6, 2000 (Microsoft Windows); December 12, 2001 (PlayStation); 2001 (Macintosh); May 15, 2014 (Linux); August 13, 2015 (Android, iOS); December 21, 2023 (Nintendo Switch, PlayStation 4)	Android, iOS, Macintosh, Microsoft Windows, Nintendo Switch, PlayStation, PlayStation 4
Pajama Sam: Life Is Rough When You Lose Your Stuff!	August 19 2003 (Macintosh, Microsoft Windows ); December 21, 2023 (Nintendo Switch, PlayStation 4)	Macintosh, Microsoft Windows, Nintendo Switch, PlayStation 4
Junior Arcade
Title	Release date	Platforms
Pajama Sam's Sock Works	July 11, 1997; June 6, 2014 (Steam)	Macintosh, Microsoft Windows
Pajama Sam's Lost and Found	December 14, 1998; June 6, 2014 (Steam)	Macintosh, Microsoft Windows
Activity Packs
Title	Release date	Platforms
Pajama Sam's One-Stop Fun Shop	July 27, 2000	Macintosh, Microsoft Windows
Pajama Sam: Games To Play On Any Day	November 7, 2001; October 23, 2014 (Steam)	Macintosh, Microsoft Windows

== Availability ==
For Steam the games were released as single games, or bundled with the other Pajama Sam games in "Pajama Sam Complete Pack" or was packaged with all Humongous Entertainment games in "Humongous Entertainment Complete Pack".

- The games are available DRM-free from GOG.com as Pajama Sam volumes 1 and 2, using SCUMMVM and running on Microsoft Windows, OS X and Linux.
- Infogrames released a CD titled "Freddi Fish / Pajama Sam Value 2-Pack" containing Freddi Fish and the Case of the Missing Kelp Seeds and Pajama Sam: No Need to Hide When It's Dark Outside.
- Humongous Entertainment released a CD titled "Humongous Entertainment Triple Treat", which included Freddi Fish and the Case of the Missing Kelp Seeds, Pajama Sam's Sock Works and Putt-Putt Saves the Zoo.
- Humongous Entertainment released a CD titled "Humongous Entertainment Triple Treat 2", which included Pajama Sam: No Need to Hide When It's Dark Outside, Freddi Fish and Luther's Maze Madness and Putt-Putt Travels Through Time.
- Pajama Sam: No Need to Hide When It's Dark Outside was included in the "Kids' BackPack IV" CD along with Math Blaster Episode I: In Search of Spot, Freddi Fish and the Case of the Missing Kelp Seeds, Just Me and My Mom and Muppet Treasure Island.
- Big Island Publishing released in 2009, a twin pack titled "Pajama Sam: 2 Pack" and containing both Pajama Sam 3: You Are What You Eat from Your Head to Your Feet and Pajama Sam: Life Is Rough When You Lose Your Stuff!.
- Humongous Entertainment released a bundle of 3 discs titled "Pajama Sam 3-pack", which included Pajama Sam: No Need to Hide When It's Dark Outside, Pajama Sam's Lost & Found and Pajama Sam 3: You Are What You Eat from Your Head to Your Feet.
- Pajama Sam's Sock Works was released for Windows and Macintosh on a compilation CD titled "Super Duper Arcade 1", along with Spy Fox in: Cheese Chase, Freddi Fish and Luther's Water Worries and Putt-Putt and Pep's Balloon-o-Rama.
- Pajama Sam's Lost & Found was released for Windows and Macintosh on a compilation CD titled "Super Duper Arcade 2", along with Spy Fox in: Hold the Mustard, Freddi Fish and Luther's Maze Madness and Putt-Putt and Pep's Dog on a Stick.

== Books ==
Various children's books about Pajama Sam have been published by Lyrick Publishing.

Title	Date	Writer	Publisher	Illustrator
Pajama Sam: Mission to the Moon	August 28, 2000	Dave Grossman	Lyrick Studios	
Pajama Sam: Color and Activity Book	August 2000		Lyrick Studios	
Pajama Sam: The Magic Hat Tree	August 2000		Lyrick Studios	N. S. Greenfield
Pajama Sam: Amazing TV Adventure	January 2001	Biz Magoo	Lyrick Studios	Dirk Wunderlich
Pajama Sam What's Different?	January 2001	Nancy Parent	Lyrick Studios	Darren McKee
Pajama Sam: Out to Lunch!	January 2001	Biz Magoo	Lyrick Studios	
Pajama Sam: Food Fight	August 2001		Lyrick Studios	
