= God of Thunder (video game) =

1993 video game

- Developer: Adept Software
- Publisher: Software Creations
- Designer: Ron Davis
- Composer: Roy Davis
- Platform: MS-DOS
- Release: 1993
- Genre: Puzzle
- Mode: Single-player

God of Thunder is a puzzle video game for MS-DOS created by Ron Davis and published by Software Creations in 1993. It was released as shareware, then became freeware circa-2002. The plot and characters are based on Norse mythology with tongue-in-cheek humor.

== Plot ==
The game chronicles the quest of Thor, son of Odin and god of thunder as he tries to reclaim Midgard for his father. Midgard, the beloved land of Odin's, was stolen from him during his "Odinsleep" by Loki, the god of mischief, with the help of Jormangund the serpent and Nognir, the Prince of the Underworld. To help in his quest, Thor is given the mythical hammer Mjolnir by Odin.

As Thor progresses, he must solve puzzles set before him by Jormangund, Nognir and finally Loki. He also has to fight his way through the countryside, past city guards, and into the lairs of the gods. Along with puzzles and action, role-playing elements are included. Thor slowly gains more powers as he progresses, and his hammer and armor are upgraded when he defeats Jormangund and Nognir. Through the entire game, Odin watches over Thor and admonishes him if Mjolnir fells an innocent person.

== Gameplay ==
Thor confronting Jormangund on his hidden island.

God of Thunder uses a top-down perspective with flip-screen transitions. Thor's primary weapon is Mjolnir, a magical hammer which, when thrown, will return to Thor when it hits an object, an enemy, or the end of the screen. While returning, the hammer can pass through and damage multiple enemies. Mjolnir can also be used to flick switches, which control logs that come up from the ground and block passage. These logs are pointy, and kill Thor if he is standing over them while they come up.

There are various other objects that block the path, each with different mechanics. For instance, barrels can be moved either horizontally or vertically depending on their orientation; some bushes can be destroyed to reveal secret entrances, and some rocks can be pushed; round rocks will keep rolling once touched nountil they reach an obstacle. Many puzzles feature snake-like enemies which cannot be harmed and will kill Thor instantly if he enters their line of sight; the player must block their view in order to pass.

In addition to his hammer, Thor acquires items and abilities which cost magic to use and have various effects. The first, the enchanted apple, heals Thor; another item electrocutes any enemy nearby. Magic and health do not regenerate over time, so they must be bought in villages or acquired from the random pickup provided by each slain enemy. These dead foes may also drop jewels, the currency of the game. The color of any item determines its value; a red item is worth 10 blue items.

== Reception ==
Comparing it to The Legend of Zelda, Computer Gaming World liked God of Thunder's gameplay and puzzles. Dragon's Sandy Petersen gave the game 3 out of 5 stars.

== Legacy ==
In March 2020, Ron Davis released the source code, music and sound effects as public-domain software on SourceForge, while graphic assets remain proprietary. On February 10, 2025, it was announced that ScummVM will support the game.
