= MoonBase Commander =

2002 video game

- Developer(s): Humongous Entertainment
- Publisher(s): Infogrames (Note: The Steam re-release was published by Rebellion Developments.)
- Designer(s): Rhett Mathis
- Composer(s): Stuart Ellison
- Engine: SCUMM
- Platform(s): Microsoft Windows
- Release: NA: August 13, 2002
- Genre(s): Turn-based strategy
- Mode(s): Single-player, multiplayer

MoonBase Commander is a strategy video game released in 2002 by Humongous Entertainment. In the game, the player controls a main hub, which can send out other hubs, attack enemy structures, create defensive buildings, and collect energy for further expansion; this is accomplished through launching buildings and/or weapons from a hub. Each building is connected to its parent hub by a cord, which cannot overlap with other cords. The game features both single-player and multiplayer formats. It won the "Best of 2002: The Game No One Played" award from IGN.

== Gameplay ==
The game is turn-based, allowing the player to spend a limited number of energy points per turn. The player can spend these energy points by attacking their opponents and/or adding more buildings to their base. Most units are ground-based and are attached by a cord to the unit that created them. Cords cannot overlap or land in water. Regardless of whether a unit is ground-based, all units need to be launched from their originating unit, similar to many artillery games. The power of a shot is not preset, but determined by how long the player holds down on the launch button. The longer it is held down, the further the unit launches. Wind can also affect the accuracy of launching units. Game maps wrap around at the edges, meaning that no player is ever in a corner.

MoonBase Commander has four factions that can be played: NiceCo, DeWulf, System7, and Team Alpha. The factions are functionally identical with only cosmetic differences.

The Skirmish mode allows the player to fight up to three computer players of varying difficulty levels. The goal of a skirmish is to destroy all opposing players.

Challenge Mode consists of sixteen premade missions, four for each faction. Each challenge has different goals, enemies, and settings. The player earns a Gold, Silver, or Bronze medal upon completing a challenge, based mainly on how long it took them to complete it. The challenges progress linearly and when one challenge is complete, the next is unlocked. The credits are played when all the challenges have been completed.

=== Multiplayer ===
Although the game has built in LAN functionality, Internet play is only accessible through third-party software. Initially Internet play was only available through GameSpy, but the Moonbase Commander Console was created shortly after the release of the original game to overcome this limitation and eventually became the most common method for fans to play online. In 2013, the source code to the Moonbase Commander Console was released under the MIT License. There is another utility called MoonbaseIP that also bypasses the need for GameSpy along with MBCImport which allows for custom maps and export/import maps.

== Development ==
MoonBase Commander was developed on the SCUMM engine, best known for its use in LucasArts adventure games. In 2024 Moonbase Commander was made to work with ScummVM thereby removing limitations to only Windows only PCs.

== Re-release ==
In early 2014, MoonBase Commander was re-released on Steam in its complete and unabridged form. It includes the full original gameplay, both single player campaigns and local (LAN) multi-player.

== Reception and legacy ==
Reception

Aggregate scores
Aggregator	Score
GameRankings	77.42%
Metacritic	77

Review score
Publication	Score
IGN	8/10

Award
Publication	Award
IGN	"Best of 2002: The Game No One Played"

MoonBase Commander received mostly positive reviews on GameRankings and Metacritic. It was praised by Tycho of Penny Arcade at the 2002 E3. Despite this, sales of the game were low, such that when an intellectual property valuation for Atari Interactive was performed in 2006, Moonbase Commander was estimated to be worth somewhere between $0 and $100,000. The rights to the MoonBase Commander franchise were sold at auction to Rebellion Developments following Atari's bankruptcy.

The editors of Computer Games Magazine presented MoonBase Commander with their 2002 "Best Budget Game" award. It won GameSpot's annual "Best Game No One Played on PC" award.
