= Humongous Entertainment =

American video game developer

Humongous, Inc.
- Logo used since Tommo's purchase of the brand; earlier versions of this logo were purple
- Formerly: Humongous Entertainment, Inc. (1992–2005)
- Type: Subsidiary
- Industry: Video games
- Founded: March 1992; 34 years ago in Woodinville, Washington, US
- Founder: Ron Gilbert; Shelley Day
- Defunct: 2013; 13 years ago
- Fate: Chapter 11 bankruptcy, assets split off
- Headquarters: Bothell, Washington, US
- Parent: Atari, Inc. (1996–2005); Atari SA (2005–2013)
- Website: humongous.com

Humongous, Inc. (formerly Humongous Entertainment, Inc.) was an American video game developer based in Bothell, Washington. Founded in 1992, the company developed multiple edutainment franchises, most prominently Putt-Putt, Freddi Fish, Pajama Sam, Spy Fox, and Backyard Sports, which, combined, sold over 15 million copies and earned more than 400 awards of excellence.

Humongous Entertainment was acquired by GT Interactive (later renamed Infogrames, Inc., then Atari, Inc.) in July 1996. By October 2000, sales of Humongous games had surpassed 16 million copies. GT, which had by that point became Atari, Inc. sold the Humongous business to its parent company, Infogrames (later renamed Atari SA), in August 2005. Atari transitioned the label to a new company, Humongous, Inc., which continued publishing games under the Humongous label until 2013. That year, the company faced bankruptcy and its assets were sold to Tommo, who re-released some of its games on digital distribution channels using the Humongous Entertainment brand name.

== History ==
=== Formation (1992–1996) ===
Humongous Entertainment was formed by Shelley Day and Ron Gilbert in March 1992, then based in Woodinville, Washington. The name Humongous Entertainment was suggested by Gilbert's ex-LucasArts colleague, Tim Schafer. It became known for creating four point-and-click adventure game series intended for young children, branded collectively as "Junior Adventures", with the four series being the Putt-Putt, the Freddi Fish, the Pajama Sam and the Spy Fox series. Characters from one series do not cross over with ones in another (with the exception of Putt-Putt and Fatty Bear's Activity Pack) and instead appear as cameos or Easter eggs in any of the three other series. All of Humongous's games until 2003 were built on the SCUMM game engine, which Gilbert had developed for LucasArts years prior; following his departure from the company, LucasArts agreed to grant Humongous a license to use SCUMM for its games, on the condition that Gilbert continue to develop updates to the engine for both companies' use. By 1995, the company had become the third largest children's educational-software company.

In 1995, Gilbert and Day established a company division, Cavedog Entertainment, in Seattle, set to develop games of alternative genres, and released Total Annihilation, a real-time strategy (RTS) game, in 1997. This was followed by two expansion packs in 1998, as well as a variation called Total Annihilation: Kingdoms plus an expansion pack in 1999.

=== Acquisitions, decline, dissolution (1996–2006) ===
In July 1996, Humongous Entertainment was purchased by GT Interactive for US$76 million. In November 1997, Humongous Entertainment signed a five-year worldwide deal with Nickelodeon to develop games based on the Nick Jr. series, Blue's Clues, making it the first and only time that Humongous has developed games based on a licensed character as opposed to its original characters. The same year, Humongous released its first Backyard Sports title, Backyard Baseball. Backyard Sports would go on to become the company's longest-running series. In November 1999, GT Interactive was acquired by Infogrames and renamed to Infogrames, Inc. In July 2000, Andy Hieke was became general manager and senior vice president. In 2000, Humongous Entertainment released a One-Stop Fun Shop activity center game for each Junior Adventure series, with the exception of Spy Fox. The co-founders tried to buy Humongous Entertainment back from Infogrames, Inc., using external funding, but the day of the planned purchase was the day of the dot-com collapse, wherefore the funding was pulled. The founders soon left Humongous, alongside many other key employees, and formed a new studio, Hulabee Entertainment, in 2001. In June 2001, Infogrames, Inc. laid off 82 personnel, over 40% of staff from Humongous Entertainment. In May 2003, after Infogrames, Inc. purchased Hasbro Interactive, which owned the rights to the Atari brand, the company was renamed Atari, Inc.

=== Humongous, Inc. (2005–2013) ===
In Atari, Inc.'s fourth quarter results in June 2005, the company announced that it would divest and dispose of various "non-core" assets that it no longer saw as part of its upcoming strategic visions or creative directions, with Humongous Entertainment being the only named division to fulfill this purpose. Shortly afterward, Atari laid off much of the development portion of the company and renamed them from Humongous Entertainment, Inc. to solely Humongous, Inc. around the same time. During this time, Atari, Inc. was in the midst of heavy financial struggles and was cutting costs as much as it could.

On August 22, 2005, Atari, Inc. announced that it would transfer Humongous, Inc. over to its majority parent, Infogrames Entertainment SA, for shares worth US$10.3 million. The deal would include all licensing rights, trademarks, intellectual property, and existing inventory. The deal would also allow for Atari, Inc. to use a fifth of the payment as a down payment, alongside continuing to exclusively distribute Humongous titles in North America and Mexico up until March 31, 2006. In October 2005, Infogrames announced they would relaunch the Humongous brand, and hired Alyssa Padia and Lauren Schechtman as the new CEOs. Infogrames stated that Humongous would focus mainly on new entries in the Backyard Sports franchise and follow up with a business strategy to "revive the Humongous Characters" series. In March 2006, Atari, Inc.'s distribution deal with Humongous, Inc. was extended another year through to March 2007.

Following the expiration of the Atari deal aside from Backyard Sports, Humongous began to publish games on its own and in October 2007, it had signed a retail exclusivity deal with Target to release remastered versions of select Junior Adventure titles. In March 2008, Interactive Game Group LLC (I2G) and Humongous, Inc. signed a North American publishing deal with Majesco to allow the latter to publish a selection of Junior Adventure titles for the Wii. These titles were the first installments of each title in the series, except Putt-Putt. Atari Europe handled publication and distribution in European territories. The ports were developed by Mistic Software, but their availability was greatly limited by a legal conflict concerning their development. In November of the same year, Humongous and Atari released the Nintendo DS game Freddi Fish: ABC Under The Sea in European territories.

In April 2008, Infogrames announced that they would purchase out the remaining shares of Atari, Inc. that they didn't own previously and would merge with them. Following this merger, Infogrames Entertainment's company name was changed to Atari SA, who would go on to publish numerous more Backyard Sports titles. Beginning in November 2011, in collaboration with Nimbus Games, Atari began releasing Android and iOS ports of several Humongous Entertainment Junior Adventure titles. These releases continued into 2012.

=== Purchase of assets by Tommo (2013–present) ===
In January 2013, following continued financial struggles from their parent company Atari SA, Humongous, Inc., and the rest of Atari's US operations all filed for Chapter 11 Bankruptcy protection in an attempt to secure independence from its profit-losing parent. During Atari's bankruptcy sale on July 19, Humongous' assets were separated as they all went to different owners. Backyard Sports was sold to private equity firm The Evergreen Group, while MoonBase Commander went to Rebellion Developments. The Humongous brand and assets concerning the Junior Adventure and Junior Arcade series were sold to Tommo alongside a selection of other Atari-owned properties.

At the start of 2014, Tommo officially relaunched the Humongous Entertainment brand by re-releasing the original Junior Adventure and Junior Arcade titles for Windows and Mac; ports for most of these titles were also released for mobile devices.

Beginning in 2022, Tommo and Hong Kong-based business Billionsoft began releasing ports of Junior Adventure titles for the Nintendo Switch and PlayStation 4 consoles. A digital compilation of the first six releases, titled Humongous Classic Collection was released in December 2022 for both systems, while a Nintendo Switch exclusive physical compilation was released in 2023. In May 2024, a digital compilation of all five of the Freddi Fish Junior Adventure games titled Freddi Fish Collection was released.

== Games developed ==
Date	Title	Series
November 6, 1992	Putt-Putt Joins the Parade	Putt-Putt
March 26, 1993	Putt-Putt's Fun Pack	Putt-Putt
March 26, 1993	Fatty Bear's Birthday Surprise	Fatty Bear
October 1, 1993	Putt-Putt Goes to the Moon	Putt-Putt
October 1, 1993	Fatty Bear's Fun Pack	Fatty Bear
March 25, 1994	Putt-Putt and Fatty Bear's Activity Pack	Putt-Putt, Fatty Bear
November 7, 1994	Freddi Fish and the Case of the Missing Kelp Seeds	Freddi Fish
November 22, 1994	Let's Explore the Farm	Junior Field Trips
July 27, 1995	Let's Explore the Airport	Junior Field Trips
August 10, 1995	Putt-Putt Saves the Zoo	Putt-Putt
November 15, 1995	Let's Explore the Jungle	Junior Field Trips
August 29, 1996	Freddi Fish 2: The Case of the Haunted Schoolhouse	Freddi Fish
October 15, 1996	Putt-Putt and Pep's Balloon-o-Rama	Putt-Putt
October 15, 1996	Putt-Putt and Pep's Dog on a Stick	Putt-Putt
October 18, 1996	Pajama Sam: No Need to Hide When It's Dark Outside	Pajama Sam
February 24, 1997	Freddi Fish and Luther's Maze Madness	Freddi Fish
February 24, 1997	Freddi Fish and Luther's Water Worries	Freddi Fish
June 1, 1997	Putt-Putt Travels Through Time	Putt-Putt
July 11, 1997	Pajama Sam's Sock Works	Pajama Sam
October 10, 1997	Backyard Baseball	Backyard Sports
October 17, 1997	Spy Fox in "Dry Cereal"	Spy Fox
October 17, 1997	Big Thinkers Kindergarten	Big Thinkers
October 17, 1997	Big Thinkers 1st Grade	Big Thinkers
March 1, 1998	Freddi Fish 3: The Case of the Stolen Conch Shell	Freddi Fish
March 31, 1998	Spy Fox in "Cheese Chase"	Spy Fox
July 1, 1998	Pajama Sam 2: Thunder and Lightning Aren't so Frightening	Pajama Sam
September 1, 1998	Blue's ABC Time Activities	Blue's Clues
September 8, 1998	Blue's Birthday Adventure	Blue's Clues
October 13, 1998	Backyard Soccer	Backyard Sports
December 14, 1998	Pajama Sam's Lost & Found	Pajama Sam
January 1, 1999	Putt-Putt Enters the Race	Putt-Putt
March 30, 1999	Freddi Fish 4: The Case of the Hogfish Rustlers of Briny Gulch	Freddi Fish
May 11, 1999	Blue's 123 Time Activities	Blue's Clues
September 7, 1999	Blue's Treasure Hunt	Blue's Clues
September 28, 1999	Spy Fox 2: "Some Assembly Required"	Spy Fox
October 19, 1999	Spy Fox in "Hold the Mustard"	Spy Fox
October 28, 1999	Backyard Football	Backyard Sports
April 6, 2000	Pajama Sam 3: You Are What You Eat from Your Head to Your Feet	Pajama Sam
May 23, 2000	Putt-Putt's One-Stop Fun Shop	Putt-Putt
June 6, 2000	Backyard Baseball 2001	Backyard Sports
July 11, 2000	Putt-Putt Joins the Circus	Putt-Putt
July 27, 2000	Freddi Fish's One-Stop Fun Shop	Freddi Fish
July 27, 2000	Pajama Sam's One-Stop Fun Shop	Pajama Sam
August 22, 2000	Blue's Reading Time Activities	Blue's Clues
August 22, 2000	Blue's Clues: Blue's Art Time Activities	Blue's Clues
October 3, 2000	Backyard Soccer MLS Edition	Backyard Sports
May 1, 2001	Spy Fox: "Operation Ozone"	Spy Fox
June 19, 2001	Freddi Fish 5: The Case of the Creature of Coral Cove	Freddi Fish
September 19, 2001	Backyard Football 2002	Backyard Sports
October 30, 2001	Backyard Basketball	Backyard Sports
November 7, 2001	Pajama Sam: Games to Play On Any Day	Pajama Sam
June 7, 2002	Backyard Baseball 2003	Backyard Sports
August 13, 2002	MoonBase Commander	Moonbase Commander
October 18, 2002	Backyard Hockey	Backyard Sports
March 11, 2003	Backyard Soccer 2004	Backyard Sports
April 15, 2003	Backyard Baseball 2005	Backyard Sports
August 19, 2003	Pajama Sam: Life Is Rough When You Lose Your Stuff!	Pajama Sam
September 4, 2003	Backyard Football 2004	Backyard Sports
September 4, 2003	Backyard Basketball 2004	Backyard Sports
September 16, 2003	Putt-Putt: Pep's Birthday Surprise	Putt-Putt
June 22, 2004	Backyard Baseball 2005	Backyard Sports
September 21, 2004	Backyard Hockey 2005	Backyard Sports
September 27, 2004	Backyard Skateboarding	Backyard Sports
September 20, 2005	Backyard Football 2006	Backyard Sports
October 5, 2005	Backyard Skateboarding: Game of the Year Edition	Backyard Sports
