= Spy Fox: "Operation Ozone" =

2001 video game

- Developer: Humongous Entertainment
- Publisher: Infogrames (Note: The Steam release was co-published by Tommo and Night Dive Studios. The iOS version was published by Tommo.)
- Producer: Rachel Frost
- Designer: Brad Carlton
- Writer: Brad Carlton
- Composers: Tom McGurk; Geoff Kirk
- Series: Spy Fox
- Engine: SCUMM
- Platforms: Mac OS, Windows, Linux, iOS, Android
- Release: Windows, Macintosh: WW: May 1, 2001; Linux: WW: May 15, 2014; iOS, Android: WW: August 13, 2015
- Genre: Adventure
- Mode: Single-player

Spy Fox: "Operation Ozone" is an adventure game developed by Humongous Entertainment and published by Infogrames, part of their "Junior Adventure" line and the final entry in the Spy Fox series of games. The game follows the heroic Spy Fox as he prevents a villainess from opening a massive hole in the ozone layer. The game was released for computers in May 2001. In 2014, it was rereleased under the slightly modified title Spy Fox 3: "Operation Ozone".

== Plot ==
Poodles' aerosol can shaped space station.

Spy Fox goes undercover in the Scottish Highlands, where he receives a message hidden inside a lipstick container from Agent Roger Boar. Later, Spy Corps' Chief learns that a giant aerosol can is spraying on Earth's ozone layer. Spy Fox soon arrives with the message, which is revealed to be a cry for help from rocket scientist Plato Pushpin, who works for Poodles Galore, the self-appointed queen of cosmetics. The Chief then sends Spy Fox to a tiny town called the "Middle of Nowhere", where Monkey Penny and Professor Quack have already set up their Mobile Command Center.

Upon Spy Fox's arrival at the Mobile Command Center, Monkey Penny informs him that Plato Pushpin has been captured by Poodles. By disguising as one of Poodles' bowlers, Spy Fox rescues Pushpin, who reveals his plan to create a congeal pill that can disarm Poodles' hairspray can, which Poodles plots to use in order to deplete the ozone layer so everyone will buy her new SPF 2001 sunscreen. He then tasks Fox with finding three ingredients for the pill, which Poodles had her minions hide in order to prevent the pill's creation, along with the giant spray can's Aerosol Particle Diameter number (A.P.D). Using Pushpin's key card to enter Poodles' cosmetics factory and Professor Quack's Spy Car as a means of transportation, Spy Fox sets out to find and collect these items.

By stealing one of Poodles' rocket ships, Spy Fox travels to outer space, where he manages to obtain the A.P.D. number from the aerosol can. Upon collecting all of the pill's ingredients, Fox gives them to Pushpin, who finishes work on the congeal pill and informs Fox that tossing the pill directly into the aerosol will be enough to disarm the can. Entering Poodles' hairspray can, Spy Fox successfully throws the pill into the aerosol as told. As the can becomes unstable, Spy Fox and Poodles flee, with the latter retreating to her secret base on the Moon. Meanwhile, Spy Fox returns to Earth, where the Chief awards him with a trophy for stopping Poodles' scheme.

In an alternate path, Spy Fox sneaks into Poodles' moonbase, where she activates a force field to protect the base from intruders while she plots revenge. At the same time, Monkey Penny arrives at the base with the help of a flying ship made by Professor Quack. After Spy Fox uses a secret code to deactivate the force field, Monkey Penny and a team of Spy Corps. agents invade the base and arrest Poodles, ending the game.

== Reception ==
Reception

Review scores
Publication	Score
Just Adventure	A
PCMag	4/5
Review Corner	4.5/5

Awards
Publication	Award
Review Corner	Award of Excellence
Parents' Choice Award	Gold Honor
Children's Software Revue	All Star Award
Choosing Children's Software	"Best Pick" Award

Spy Fox: "Operation Ozone" was the fifth Top Selling Home Education Software for the week of 5/06/2001-5/12/2001, third for 5/13/2001-5/19/2001, fourth for 5/27/2001-6/2/2001, and third for 6/3/2001-6/9/2001, according to PC Data. In North America alone, the game sold 77,133 copies during the year 2001.

Review Corner gave the game a score of 4.5 stars in addition to an Award of Excellence.
