= Blue's 123 Time Activities =

1999 video game

- Developer: Humongous Entertainment
- Publisher: Humongous Entertainment
- Series: Blue's Clues
- Engine: SCUMM
- Platforms: PC, Mac OS
- Release: May 11, 1999
- Genre: Educational
- Mode: Single-player

Blue's 123 Time Activities is a 1999 educational game developed and published by Humongous Entertainment. The game works on Windows 95 and above, and on System 7.5.3 (with PowerPC) to Mac OS X Tiger. It was the third game in the Blue's Clues video game series, in turn based on the Blue's Clues television series.

== Gameplay ==
This educational point-and-click game teaches players maths through fun activities, as they help Steve Burns and Blue and their friends accomplish goals and tasks. Kids learn skills such as measurement, estimation, weight, pattern, and counting.

== Critical reception ==
SuperKids said the game taught maths in a "pleasant, non-threatening way". Review Corner said the game had "excellent activities" and "good replay value". Allgame said the game captured the "flavor, feel, and tone" of the TV series. KidSource wrote the game was a "high-performance multimedia program". Discovery Education opined the game was both educational and entertaining. Sonic described the game as "wonderful" and Parent's Choice deemed it "charming". A review by education professors at the University of Texas highly recommended the title. Playtesters thought the game was a "great learning experience". Kids Domain praised the graphics and audio for emulating the TV series.

The game was the winner of the 1999/2000 BESSIE Award for Math.
