= Spy Fox 2: "Some Assembly Required" =

1999 video game

- CD cover
- Developer: Humongous Entertainment
- Publisher: Humongous Entertainment (Note: The Steam release was co-published by Tommo and Night Dive Studios. The iOS release was published by Tommo.)
- Designers: Lisa Wick; Brad Carlton
- Artist: John Michaud (animator)
- Composers: Tom McGurk; Geoff Kirk
- Engine: SCUMM
- Platforms: Mac OS, Windows, iOS, Android
- Release: Windows, Macintosh: WW: September 28, 1999; Linux: WW: May 1, 2014; iOS: WW: August 13, 2015
- Genre: Adventure
- Mode: Single-player

Spy Fox 2: "Some Assembly Required" is an adventure game developed and published by Humongous Entertainment as part of their Junior Adventure line and the second entry in the Spy Fox series of games. The game follows the heroic Spy Fox as he races to stop a giant robot from destroying the World's Fair. The game was released for computers in September 1999.

== Gameplay ==
"Some Assembly Required" features the same mechanics as Spy Fox in "Dry Cereal". The paths in this game vary just like in most other Humongous Entertainment games, but there are only two possible scenarios for how the tasks will play out, instead of each of the tasks being randomly selected for each playthrough.

== Plot ==
Spy Fox at the main plaza of World's Fair.

In the Alps, Spy Fox meets with Canadian Spy Corps Agent Gracefully, who gives him a trash bag retrieved from an organization called S.M.E.L.L.Y. (the Society for Meaningless Evil, Larceny, Lying, and Yelling). After fleeing from S.M.E.L.L.Y. goons, Spy Fox meets with the Chief of Spy Corps, revealing that the bag contains a box and instructions for a 1/1000 scale "Evil Dogbot" toy addressed to S.M.E.L.L.Y. leader Napoleon LeRoach. The Chief sends Fox to the World's Fair to investigate, with Monkey Penny and Professor Quack providing assistance from the Mobile Command Center. Using one of Professor Quack's gadgets, Spy Fox creates a false ID card to infiltrate LeRoach's restaurant, the Chateau LeRoach, and confront him.

In the Chateau LeRoach, LeRoach explains to Spy Fox that he has used the likeness of the small Dogbot toy to build a 1000/1 scale giant Dogbot, disguising it as the centerpiece for the World's Fair, complete with a revolving restaurant. The people going through the turnstile are unknowingly winding the clockwork mechanism powering the Dogbot; when the millionth customer enters, the Dogbot will become fully operational and go on a destructive rampage. To ensure he could not be stopped, LeRoach hid the Dogbot's off switch, which would also require an activation code, and implemented a breath analyzer to prevent unauthorized access to the Dogbot's entrance in its Achilles' heel. LeRoach then imprisons Fox in the Dogbot's mouth, only for Spy Fox to escape. The reason why LeRoach wants to rule the world is because when he was a child, he had waited in line for over twelve hours to see the Famous French Pastries of the Past exhibit, only to be denied entry because he was not tall enough to go through the turnstile and children laughed at him for being small.

Spy Fox works together with Agent Walter Wireless to receive the activation code from Agent Dottie Dash and learns the food necessary to bypass the breath analyzer, allowing him to sneak into the Dogbot and retrieve the off switch. Moments after placing it back on the control console and setting the code, the millionth customer walks through the turnstile and LeRoach activates the Dogbot, attacking the fair, only for Spy Fox to quickly deactivate it. With his scheme foiled, LeRoach escapes to the sewers. Afterwards, the Spy Chief presents Spy Fox with an award for defeating LeRoach, which the player can print out.

In an alternate ending, Spy Fox follows LeRoach into the sewers (unbeknownst to the latter), where he discovers LeRoach's plot to launch a computer program that will burn a million pieces of toast from toasters hidden inside the Dogbot, creating a giant smoke cloud over the World's Fair before escaping to Fiji via a sewer pipe. Redirecting the pipe, Spy Fox flushes LeRoach down it, sending him through the pipe to a Spy Jail cell.

== Reception ==
Reception

Review scores
Publication	Score
Review Corner	4.5/5
The Electric Playground	9.5/10

Award
Publication	Award
Review Corner	Award of Excellence

The Electric Playground named Spy Fox 2 the best computer adventure game of 1999.
