= Putt-Putt Enters the Race =

1999 point-and-click adventure game

- Developer: Humongous Entertainment
- Publisher: Humongous Entertainment (Note: The iOS/Android release was published by Tommo. The Steam release was co-published by Tommo and Night Dive Studios.)
- Designers: Mark Peyser; Richard Moe
- Writer: Laurie Bauman Arnold
- Composer: Tom McGurk
- Series: Putt-Putt
- Engine: SCUMM
- Platforms: Mac OS, Windows, Android, iOS
- Release: Mac OS, Windows; January 1, 1999; Android, iOS; June 27, 2014
- Genre: Adventure
- Mode: Single-player

Putt-Putt Enters the Race is a 1999 children's point-and-click adventure game developed and published by Humongous Entertainment. In the game, Putt-Putt must collect four pieces of equipment needed to enter the Cartown 500 auto race.

The game is the fifth entry in the Putt-Putt series, being preceded by Putt-Putt Travels Through Time in 1997 and followed by Putt-Putt Joins the Circus in 2000. It is the first game in the series in which Putt-Putt is voiced by Nancy Cartwright.

The game was released for Microsoft Windows and Macintosh OS on January 1, 1999. It has since been re-released on Steam and ported to Linux, Android, and iOS.

== Gameplay ==
The game uses most of the same mechanics as its predecessors, except the ignition key shown on Putt-Putt's dashboard, which had previously been used to quit the game, now opens up a menu, where the player can save or load a game, along with quitting it.

== Plot ==
While playing with Pep, Putt-Putt receives an invitation from Redline Rick to enter the Cartown 500 race. Excited, Putt-Putt goes to the Speedway to sign up. At the speedway, Redline Rick tells Putt-Putt that he needs a special kind of fuel, more durable tires, a safety helmet for Pep to wear, and a racing flag. Determined to enter the race, Putt-Putt decides to collect those items around Cartown.

After collecting all four items, Putt-Putt returns to the Speedway and prepares for the race. The game's ending depends on the outcome of the race: Putt-Putt receives a trophy from Redline Rick and is announced to the audience if he finishes in the top 3 but is given a ribbon for his good sportsmanship if he finishes the race 4th to 7th. Regardless, Putt-Putt thanks everyone in Cartown for their part in getting the items he needed to participate and declares, "It's not if you win or lose. It's how you race around the track!"

== Development ==
Putt-Putt Enters the Race was created by Humongous Entertainment as part of the popular edutainment series Putt-Putt in January 1999. The game was re-released in 2014 for iOS, Android, and Steam.

== Marketing ==
Putt-Putt Enters the Race was officially unveiled at the 1998 Electronic Entertainment Expo in Atlanta, May 28–30, at booth 5626. Humongous Entertainment executive vice president of marketing and licensing, Ralph Giuffre, said that this title was purposely designed for younger players. On January 14, the Humongous Entertainment website (humongous.com) launched a week-long online celebration for the game, which included offering players free downloadable demos, online games, contests and other items at the Putt-Putt's Pit Stop. In December 1999, Humongous partnered with the Make-A-Wish Foundation for a holiday promotion where customers could "donate the full $10 to the Make-A-Wish Foundation or donate $2 to the charity and receive $8 back" at participating national software retail outlets for Humongous's best-selling 16 software, which included this game.

== Reception ==
Reception

Review scores
| Publication | Score |
|---|---|
| Review Corner | 4.5/5 |
| Unikgamer | 7/10 |

Awards
| Publication | Award |
|---|---|
| Children's Software Revue | All Star Software Award |
| Choosing Children's Software | Best Picks for the Holidays Award |
| Family Tested-Recommended | Seal of Approval |

Sonic praised the game for being both fun and educational, while challenging kids in creative ways. Superkids said the game was best-suited to children who have curiosity and patience. Eugene Register-Guard described the game as "challenging and entertaining". The Bryan Times praised the user interface. Lakeland Ledger thought the game was "charming". Ouders Online said the game was highly fun, and added that Putt-Putt was a good role model. The Boston Herald praised the game's "smooth animation and appealing characters", while saying that its complexity would appeal to older players. The 52 year old reviewer at The Colombian enjoyed the interactive content, commenting that the game had a high "Giggle-to-Click Ratio". Star Tribune said that, like other Humongous games, this title was "high-quality" and "entertaining", while complimenting its replay value. The game was used in a study by The Mirror. Daily Herald deemed the game "above average" and "sweet". PC Mag said a parent "can't go wrong" with buying the game for their 3-8-year-old child.

== Sales ==
According to PC Data of Reston, the game was the 5th top-selling educational title across 13 software retail chains for the week ended January 16, and the 9th top-selling home-education software for the week ended May 1. Putt-Putt Enters the Race ranked 8th on PC Data's list of Top-Selling Home Education Software for the week of April 4 to 10 in 1999.
