= Blue's Birthday Adventure =

1998 video game

- Developer: Humongous Entertainment
- Publisher: Humongous Entertainment
- Series: Blue's Clues
- Engine: SCUMM
- Platforms: Mac OS, Windows
- Release: NA: September 1, 1998
- Genre: Educational
- Mode: Single-player

Blue's Birthday Adventure is an educational video game for children from the ages of 3–6 years of age. The game is based on the pre-school television program Blue's Clues, specifically the episode "Blue's Birthday". It was developed and published by Humongous Entertainment. The game is about how Steve tries to find three clues to figure out what Blue wants to have for her birthday.

== Gameplay ==
Blue's Birthday Adventure is packaged on two CD-ROMs, and each CD-ROM contains two scenarios in the form of questions. These are all themed around Steve, Blue's owner, preparing for Blue the dog's birthday party. Before play commences the player must first enter their name, date of birth and their favorite color. Players control Steve during play, who breaks the fourth wall by directly speaking to players. The game shares many similarities with the television series. These include Steve being a live-action character appearing in a two-dimensional house designed to look like a paper cut out and Blue communicating by leaving blue paw prints in pertinent locations.

Once the scenario is selected the player must help Steve complete it by solving three problems, guiding him through the house in order to locate clues. Each problem is solved by finding clues which are marked by blue paw prints within the game. In order to locate clues players must interact with characters in the game and provide them with the items they require. Each clue found results in a task for the player. Once all the clues have been located and the tasks presented have been completed, the player helps Steve perform a song, such as the Blue's Clues theme tune.

The game is split into three difficulty levels; these affect the task which the player must complete when they discover a clue. For instance, at the lowest difficulty level a clue may be solved by picking the correct drawing shown on the screen, on the higher difficulty level the same task may require player to piece segments of the picture together in order to produce a complete picture.

== Reception ==
Reception

Review scores
Publication	Score
All Game Guide	4/5
MacHome Journal	4/5

PC Magazine rated the game as 6th place of the Top-Selling Retail Software. The game was also nominated for "PC Children's Entertainment Title of the Year" and "PC Educational Title of the Year (0-8 years)" for the AIAS' 2nd Annual Interactive Achievement Awards.

Blue's Birthday Adventure ranked 9th on PC Data's list of Top-Selling Home Education Software for the week of April 4 to 10 in 1999.
