= Blue's ABC Time Activities =

- Developer: Humongous Entertainment
- Publisher: Humongous Entertainment
- Platforms: Windows; Macintosh
- Release: September 1, 1998

Blue's ABC Time Activities is a 1998 educational video game developed and published by Humongous Entertainment. It was released on September 1, 1998.

== Gameplay ==
The player is guided by Steve to help Blue gather words for her storybook by completing six different activities, each awarding colored letters that correspond to pages in the book, including assembling words and pictures with felt pieces, navigating alphabet mazes with Shovel and Pail, choosing snacks that begin with given letters, taking snapshots of animals whose names start with specific letters during a safari, matching missing letters in Mailbox's mail, and selecting rhyming words for Slippery Soap's rhyme; after completing activities and optionally inserting new words into the story with Tickety when colors match, the player receives feedback from Steve, who then sings the "So Long" song as the words appear in Blue's book.

== Reception ==
Reception

Review scores
Publication	Score
All Game Guide	4/5
MacHome Journal	3/5
Southtown Star	4/5

Kids Domain called Blue's ABC Time Activities not only a great buy but a great investment. All Game Guide recommended Blue's ABC Time Activities to children.

Blue's ABC Time Activities ranked first on PC Data's list of Top-Selling Home Education Software for the week of April 4 to 10 in 1999.
