= Fatty Bear's Birthday Surprise =

1993 video game

- Developer: Humongous Entertainment
- Publisher: Humongous Entertainment (Note: The 3DO version was published by Marubeni. The Steam release was co-published by Tommo and Night Dive Studios.)
- Designers: Laurie Bauman; Annie Fox; Ron Gilbert; Shelley Day
- Writers: Laurie Bauman; Annie Fox
- Composer: Tom McMail
- Engine: SCUMM
- Platforms: MS-DOS, 3DO, Windows, Classic Mac OS
- Release: 1993: 3DO, MS-DOS, Mac; 1995: Windows; Oct 23, 2014: Linux
- Genre: Adventure
- Mode: Single-player

Fatty Bear's Birthday Surprise is an adventure video game developed by Humongous Entertainment and published in 1993 for 3DO, MS-DOS, and Classic Mac OS. A Windows version followed in 1995. Fatty Bear's Birthday Surprise is the second game by Humongous Entertainment, following Putt-Putt Joins the Parade. It is the only Fatty Bear adventure, although the character was also used in the minigame compilations Fatty Bear's Fun Pack and the crossover spin-off Putt-Putt & Fatty Bear's Activity Pack. In July 2013, Tommo bought the Fatty Bear license for the Atari bankruptcy proceedings.

== Plot ==
A girl named Kayla falls asleep the night before her birthday, looking forward to a big surprise present that her parents announced. While she sleeps, Kayla's plushies come to life to prepare for her party. Kayla's teddy bear, Fatty Bear, decides to make a chocolate chip birthday cake for the party and accepts the help of Kayla's stuffed bunny, Matilda Rabbit, in baking it, while Kayla's doll, Gretchen, volunteers to decorate Kayla's room for the party, including making a sign on Kayla's bulletin board saying, "Happy Birthday". Fatty Bear and Matilda Rabbit then head to the kitchen in order to start making the cake.

In the kitchen, Fatty Bear discovers a present box and becomes curious as to what could be in it. Much to his surprise, a female puppy bursts out of the box and starts causing havoc around the house. When Fatty Bear returns to Kayla's room, Gretchen tells him that the puppy stole three of the letters to the Happy Birthday sign and tasks the bear with finding them, as well as blowing five balloons for her, which he does.

Using a bone and a ribbon he found, Fatty Bear lures the puppy back into her present box and wraps the box back up. After baking the cake for the party and returning the missing letters, Fatty Bear jumps onto Kayla's bed and goes back to stuffed animal form as morning comes. Kayla then awakens and expresses delight with how beautiful her room looks. Her father then comes in to deliver her surprise, which turns out to be the puppy. Kayla appreciates her birthday party and thanks everyone for it, especially Fatty Bear, to whom she gives a big hug, ending the game.

== Gameplay ==
The gameplay is much like that of the Putt-Putt games. The player is able to control Fatty Bear by clicking on a specific spot in each location for Fatty Bear to move to. Fatty Bear has the ability to keep items in his pockets to solve puzzles. There are also different minigames that can be played throughout the game.

== Reception ==
Reception

Review scores
Publication	Score
Electronic Gaming Monthly	7.2/10 (3DO)
MacUser	4.5/5

Awards
Publication	Award
Compute!	Best Educational Program
PC Home	Best Educational Program
MacUser	4 ½ Mouse Award

Electronic Gaming Monthly gave the 3DO version a 7.2 out of 10, saying that it is similar to the Putt-Putt games, but that, given the choice between the two games, gamers should get one of the Putt-Putt games instead. Computer Gaming World approved of the "delightful" PC version's interactivity and lack of need to complete the game, describing it as "a wonderful introduction to the computer for beginning users and a delightful game for more experienced youngsters".
