= Pajama Sam 2: Thunder and Lightning Aren't so Frightening =

1998 video game

- Developer: Humongous Entertainment
- Publisher: Humongous Entertainment (Note: The iOS release was published by Atari. The iOS re-release and Android version were published by Tommo. The Steam release was co-published by Tommo and Night Dive Studios. The Nintendo Switch version was published by UFO Interactive Games.)
- Designers: Matt Mahon; Rhonda Conley
- Writer: Dave Grossman
- Series: Pajama Sam
- Engine: SCUMM
- Platforms: Android, iOS, Linux, Mac OS, OS X, Windows, Nintendo Switch, PlayStation 4
- Release: July 1, 1998: Windows, Macintosh; NA: July 1, 1998 iOS; WW: April 5, 2012 Android; WW: April 3, 2014 Linux, OS X; WW: May 1, 2014 Switch; WW: February 10, 2022 PlayStation 4; WW: November 3, 2022
- Genre: Adventure
- Mode: Single-player

Pajama Sam 2: Thunder and Lightning Aren't so Frightening is a 1998 point-and-click adventure game developed and published by Humongous Entertainment for Windows and Macintosh. This game was ported to Android under the title Pajama Sam: Thunder and Lightning in April 2014. A Nintendo Switch version was released in February 2022, followed by the PlayStation 4 version on the PlayStation Store in November. The second game of the Pajama Sam franchise, it features the title character entering the World Wide Weather through his attic to stop a thunderstorm. The game was followed by Pajama Sam 3: You Are What You Eat from Your Head to Your Feet in 2000.

== Plot ==
While watching television, Sam gets startled by a thunderstorm and decides to make it stop by traveling to World Wide Weather, the company that produces the weather. By stowing away in a crate to be carried into World Wide Weather, Sam infiltrates the building and confronts the workers Thunder and Lightning, only to realize that they are very friendly and that thunderstorms are beneficial for plants.

While trying to step closer, Sam trips over his cape and accidentally lands on a red button that causes the company's weather machines to break and all the weather around the world to go out of control. Sam is then tasked with finding four missing pieces belonging to the weather machines while Thunder and Lightning report the incident to World Wide Weather's president, Mother Nature.

As Sam progresses with fixing the machines, Thunder and Lightning compliment him on his hard work. After Sam fixes three of the machines, Mother Nature, suspicious of the strange weather occurring, decides to inspect World Wide Weather, putting Thunder and Lightning's jobs on the line. Fortunately, Sam manages to fix the last machine as soon as Mother Nature arrives. After Mother Nature leaves for vacation, Thunder and Lightning thank Sam for saving their jobs and let him control the weather as a reward.

== Gameplay ==
Like the first game, this game employs multiple scenarios to play. Each of the four weather machine parts can be found in one of two locations which are completely random. A new feature is the option to choose from several scenarios of where the machine parts are located, though the options of scenarios are rather limited due to some of the puzzles conflicting with each other. An optional second quest of this game is to find all 16 missing pieces of Sam's jigsaw puzzle, which will form an amusing picture when they are all collected. Several minigames, including a weather-based board game called "Weather Board" are included.

== Reception ==
Reception

Review scores
Publication	Score
Adventure Gamers	4/5
Review Corner	5/5
Unikgamer	7/10
MacHome	4/5

Award
Publication	Award
Review Corner	Award of Excellence

Pajama Sam 2 received generally positive reviews upon release, but critics noted the game wasn't as good as the first. Pajama Sam 2 got 5 out of 5 stars from Review Corner, 7/10 from Unikgamer, 4 out of 5 stars from Adventure Gamers and 4 out of 5 stars from MacHome. Review Corner gave this game the Award of Excellence.
