= Pajama Sam 3: You Are What You Eat from Your Head to Your Feet =

2000 video game

- Developer: Humongous Entertainment (Note: Ported to the PlayStation by Runecraft.)
- Publisher: Humongous Entertainment (Note: The PlayStation version was published by Infogrames. The Steam release was co-published by Tommo and Night Dive Studios. The iOS/Android version was published by Tommo.)
- Designers: Rhonda Conley; Eric Gross
- Artist: John Michaud (animator)
- Writer: Dave Grossman
- Composer: George Alistair Sanger
- Series: Pajama Sam
- Engine: SCUMM
- Platforms: Windows, Macintosh, PlayStation, iOS, Android, Nintendo Switch, PlayStation 4
- Release: April 6, 2000: Windows April 6, 2000 PlayStation December 12, 2001 Macintosh 2001 Linux May 15, 2014 Android, iOS August 13, 2015 Switch, PlayStation 4 December 21, 2023
- Genre: Adventure game
- Mode: Single-player

Pajama Sam 3: You Are What You Eat from Your Head to Your Feet is a 2000 adventure game developed and published by Humongous Entertainment for Microsoft Windows, Macintosh, PlayStation, and Linux operating systems.

== Plot ==
The game starts with Sam ruining his appetite by eating cookies, with the goal of collecting 20 “box tops” for a prize, but the remaining cookies become sentient and escape to Sam's pantry. After finding and putting on his cape, Sam follows the cookies there, only to fall into an island populated by anthropomorphic foods called Moptop, where he participates in a political party called S.S.A.M. (Snacks and Sweets Aggressive Majority), which plans to take over the island. After inadvertently offending the participants by talking about his dinner, Sam is jailed and meets his cellmate named Florette, who is a peace conference delegate at a building called the Food Pyramid. Sam and Florette soon escape their cell and head over to said building.

At the Pyramid, a carrot (that Sam met in the first game), reveals to Sam that he arranged the conference to prevent a general officer named Beetfoot from declaring war against the sweets, but four out of six delegates still aren't present: Chuck Cheddar (of the Dairy food group), Bean 47 (of the Protein food group), Granny Smythe (of the Fruits food group) and Pierre Le Pain (of the Grains food group); other than Florette, the only delegate to arrive was a lollipop named Luke Wigglebig, who is not part of the Sweet Troops. Sam agrees to find the four missing delegates and send them right to the conference.

After Sam rescues all of the delegates, he checks up on them at the conference. There, he finds that an argument has ensued over which food group is the best. Overwhelmed by all the fighting, Sam intervenes and gives a speech on how "no food is an island" and that they can work together to create new and better foods. The delegates gladly agree and General Beetfoot happily declares eternal peace on Moptop. While the delegates celebrate the agreement they've reached, Sam realizes that he's missed dinner.

== Gameplay ==
Originally released as a Junior Adventure for children ages 3–8, the aim of this game is to get the 4 missing delegates for the meeting to declare happiness between the 6 food groups, with the intent of teaching children about healthy eating. Each of the four missing delegates can be in either of two unique predicaments, which are randomly chosen on a new playthrough, and as in the previous game of the series, players can also choose which scenarios to play with at the options screen. Unlike the previous game, though, the puzzles are not chosen through several combinations of scenarios, therefore the player is freer to pick whichever puzzles they want. Like previous games, this game contains minigames and an optional side-quest; in this game, the player can collect 20 box tops in order to get a new Pajama Man action figure for Sam. A sentient donut named Sprinkle can be used to travel to new locations.

== Reception ==
Reception

Review scores
Publication	Score
Adventure Gamers	4/5
Review Corner	4.5/5
Unikgamer	7/10

Awards
Publication	Award
Review Corner	Award of Excellence
Parents' Choice Award	Silver Honor
Children's Software Revue	All Star Award

Pajama Sam 3 received positive reviews from critics. Bonnie Huie of Macworld praised the game's dialogue and animation work and noted that the game is more entertaining than it is educational. Charles Herold of The New York Times praised Sam's optimistic outlook, the humor, and the replayability, and declared that the game was enjoyable by both children and adults.

== Soundtrack ==
In 2026, a remastered version of the game's jazz soundtrack ("From Your Head to Your Feet: The Jazz Music of Pajama Sam") was announced on vinyl.
