= Big Thinkers (video game series) =

- Cover art of Big Thinkers! Kindergarten featuring Ben Brightly (left) and Becky Brightly
- Genres: Adventure, edutainment
- Developer: Humongous Entertainment
- Publisher: Humongous Entertainment
- Platforms: Windows, Macintosh
- First release: Big Thinkers! Kindergarten; October 17, 1997
- Latest release: Big Thinkers! 1st Grade; October 17, 1997

Big Thinkers is a short-lived series of educational games from Humongous Entertainment, which revolved around siblings Ben and Becky Brightly (voiced by Mike Shapiro and Karen Kay Cody respectively), two characters with the ability to shape-shift into any object they desire. The series contains two games: Big Thinkers! Kindergarten and Big Thinkers! 1st Grade. Both titles were released on the same date, October 17, 1997, and feature the same goal of collecting stars. The title was conceived and developed by Jonathan Maier.

There were plans to release a third game in the series, Big Thinkers! 2nd Grade, which would have been released in 1998. It was initially developed in parallel with the other two games but was abandoned when working on three games at once proved to be too ambitious and due to poor sales for the first two titles.

== Production ==
Big Thinkers! was designed to consist of "a grade-specific learning program".

== Gameplay ==
The player interacts with Ben and Becky as objects, while exploring the house and playing sixteen mini-games to earn stars of one of five colors: red, yellow, green, blue, and purple. Each color represents a different category of education:

- Red Smart Stars: Reading/English
- Yellow Smart Stars: Art/Creativity
- Green Smart Stars: Thinking Skills/Spatial Recognition
- Blue Smart Stars: Math/Computation
- Purple Smart Stars: Physical Science/Social Science

Upon collecting a large amount of each color, the player then has a chance to attempt a longer mini-game to obtain a larger dull orange-colored star wearing a square academic cap (sunglasses and a skateboard in First Grade). Many mini games are available in both games, but in each game they are different. The house lay-out is the same except in Big Thinkers 1st Grade the woods is replaced with a garage.

Big Thinkers! Kindergarten taught skills such as measurements, spelling, and letter identification. In teaching math, language arts, science / social science, creative arts and skills, the game built upon the national curriculum standards for kindergarten students.

== Critical reception ==
The series had a mixed reception. The Boston Herald wrote that the series was released to a "universal yawn", as opposed to other Humongous series such as Putt-Putt and Freddi Fish, which were popular, fun, rewarding, and replayable, according to the site. They added that the series' protagonists Ben and Becky "fail to ignite sympathy" and some activities were not well-designed, dull, and insoluble, but they thought that other activities were "both age-appropriate and amusing". The Rocky Mountain News wrote that while the series in theory "includes all the elements that should make for a successful program", in reality it was uncaptivating, confusing, and frustrating, with navigation being a significant issue. The Washington Times deemed Kindergarten "skill-sharpening", while Humpty Dumpty Magazine thought Kindergarten had "many great games to play". ReviewCorner said Kindergarten was "busier" and more challenging than its competitors in the market. Discovery Education reviewed 1st Grade by noting that many first-graders may find the program too challenging.
