= Monkey Island =

- The original series logo
- Developers: LucasArts (1990–2010); Telltale Games (2009); Terrible Toybox (2022)
- Publishers: LucasArts (1990–2010); Devolver Digital (2022)
- Creator: Ron Gilbert
- Writers: Ron Gilbert; Dave Grossman; Tim Schafer
- Platforms: Atari ST, Amiga, DOS, Windows, Classic Mac OS, macOS, Mega-CD, PlayStation 2, XBLA, WiiWare, PSN, iOS, Nintendo Switch, PlayStation 5, Xbox Series X/S, Android
- First release: The Secret of Monkey Island; 1990
- Latest release: Return to Monkey Island; 19 September 2022

Monkey Island is a series of adventure games. The first four games were produced and published by LucasArts, previously known as Lucasfilm Games. The fifth was developed by Telltale Games with LucasArts, while the sixth was developed by Terrible Toybox with Lucasfilm Games and Devolver Digital.

The games follow the adventures of the hapless Guybrush Threepwood as he struggles to become the most notorious pirate in the Caribbean, defeat the plans of the evil undead pirate LeChuck and win the heart of Governor Elaine Marley. The plots often involve the mysterious Monkey Island and its secrets.

Monkey Island was created by Ron Gilbert. Gilbert worked on the first two games before leaving LucasArts. Dave Grossman and Tim Schafer, co-writers of the first two games, had success on other games before they both left LucasArts. The rights to Monkey Island remained with LucasArts, and the third and fourth games were created without direct involvement from the original writing staff. Grossman was a creative director on the fifth game in the series, which Gilbert was a consultant on the early stages of. Gilbert returned to the series with the sixth game, Return to Monkey Island (2022), which he co-wrote and co-designed with Grossman.

== Background ==
Ron Gilbert's two main inspirations for the story were Disneyland's Pirates of the Caribbean ride and Tim Powers' book On Stranger Tides. The book was the inspiration for the story and characters, while the ride was the inspiration for the ambiance. Gilbert said in an interview that:

[the POTC Ride] keeps you moving through the adventure but I've always wished I could get off and wander around, learn more about the characters, and find a way onto those pirate ships. So with The Secret of Monkey Island I wanted to create a game that had the same flavor, but where you could step off the boat and enter that whole storybook world.

== Media ==
=== Games ===
Release timeline
1990	The Secret of Monkey Island
1991	Monkey Island 2: LeChuck's Revenge
1992–1996
1997	The Curse of Monkey Island
1998–1999
2000	Escape from Monkey Island
2001–2008
2009	Tales of Monkey Island
2009	The Secret of Monkey Island: Special Edition
2010	Monkey Island 2: LeChuck's Revenge: Special Edition
2011–2021
2022	Return to Monkey Island

==== The Secret of Monkey Island ====
The series debuted in 1990 with The Secret of Monkey Island on the Amiga, MS-DOS, Atari ST and Macintosh platforms; the game was later ported to FM Towns and Mega-CD (1993). A remake version with updated graphics and new voiceovers was released for PlayStation Network, PC Windows, Xbox Live Arcade and OS X. An iPhone version was also released on July 23, 2009.

The game starts off with the main character Guybrush Threepwood stating "I want to be a pirate!" To do so, he must prove himself to three old pirate captains. During the perilous pirate trials, he meets the beautiful governor Elaine Marley, with whom he falls in love, unaware that the ghost pirate LeChuck also has his eyes on her. When Elaine is kidnapped, Guybrush procures crew and ship to track LeChuck down, defeat him and rescue his love.

==== Monkey Island 2: LeChuck's Revenge ====
The second game, Monkey Island 2: LeChuck's Revenge from 1991, was available for fewer platforms; it was only released for PC MS-DOS, Amiga, Macintosh, and later for FM Towns. A Special Edition version, in a similar style as The Secret of Monkey Island: Special Edition, was released in July 2010 for iPhone, iPad, iPod Touch, Mac, PC, PS3 and Xbox 360.

As Guybrush, with a treasure chest in hand, and Elaine hang onto ropes in a void, he tells her the story of the game. He has decided to find the greatest of all treasures, that of Big Whoop. Unwittingly he helps revive LeChuck, who is now in zombie form. Guybrush is eventually captured by his nemesis, but escapes with help from Wally and finds the treasure only to find himself dangling from a rope, as depicted at the beginning of the game. As Guybrush concludes his story, his rope breaks and he finds himself facing LeChuck, whom he finally defeats using voodoo. The surrealistic ending is open to a number of interpretations. In the manual of The Curse of Monkey Island, it is stated that Guybrush falls victim to a hex implemented by LeChuck.

==== The Curse of Monkey Island ====
The Curse of Monkey Island, the third in the series, was released exclusively for Microsoft Windows on PC in 1997, after a 6-year hiatus. The Curse of Monkey Island was released at the height of some of the biggest technological advancements in the gaming industry—digital audio, CD-ROM technology, and improved graphics.

Monkey Island I and II were originally released on floppy disks with text dialogue only. Entire conversations between characters would appear as written text, or as captions above their heads. The visuals of the third installment were also an improvement over the original game, using a more modern cel animation style. The Curse of Monkey Island is the only game in the series to feature this style of animation; subsequent games used three-dimensional polygon animation.

Threepwood, unwittingly, turns Elaine into a gold statue with a cursed ring, and she is subsequently stolen by pirates. He tracks her down before searching for another ring that can lift the curse. LeChuck appears in a fiery demon form, and is hot on Threepwood’s heels until a stand-off on LeChuck's amusement park ride, Monkey Mountain.

==== Escape from Monkey Island ====
Escape from Monkey Island, the fourth installment, was released in 2000 for PC Windows, and in 2001 for Macintosh and PlayStation 2.

When Guybrush Threepwood and Elaine Marley return from their honeymoon, they find that Elaine has been declared officially dead, her mansion is under a destruction order, and her position as governor is up for election. Guybrush investigates and unearths a conspiracy by LeChuck and evil real estate developer Ozzie Mandrill to use a voodoo talisman, "The Ultimate Insult", to make all pirates docile in order to turn the Caribbean into a center of tourism.

==== Tales of Monkey Island ====
Tales of Monkey Island is the fifth installment within the series, co-developed by Telltale Games and LucasArts, with a simultaneous release both on WiiWare and PC. Unlike other installments, Tales is an episodic adventure consisting of five different episodes. The first episode was released on July 7, with the last one released on December 8, 2009.

During a heated battle with his nemesis, the evil pirate LeChuck, Guybrush unwittingly unleashes an insidious pox that rapidly spreads across the Caribbean, turning pirates into zombie-like monsters. The Voodoo Lady sends Guybrush in search of a legendary sea sponge to stem the epidemic, but this seemingly straightforward quest has surprises around every corner.

==== Return to Monkey Island ====
With the purchase of LucasArts by the Walt Disney Company in 2012, the rights to the franchise are now property of Disney. In the second half of 2010s, Disney Interactive ceased the production on gaming and transitioned to a licensing model. Gilbert wrote on Twitter that he was interested in buying the Monkey Island and Maniac Mansion properties. Fans of the series launched an online petition asking Disney to sell the franchise to Gilbert; by December 2021, the petition had gathered about 29,000 signatures.

Return to Monkey Island, the sixth Monkey Island installment, was released on September 19, 2022, on the Nintendo Switch and Windows, coming to other formats later. It is a collaboration between Gilbert's Terrible Toybox studio and Lucasfilm Games, and published by Devolver Digital. A frame story in the game serves to explain and continue from the ending of LeChuck's Revenge, while the main narrative takes place after the other games in the series. Ron Gilbert has expressed his desire to tell a simple and focused pirate story in the game, while also redefining the adventure game user interface and deepening the greater lore. In addition to Gilbert, Grossman returns as co-writer, with music from veteran series composers Michael Land, Peter McConnell, and Clint Bajakian, and Dominic Armato, Alexandra Boyd, and Denny Delk reprising their roles as Guybrush, Elaine, and Murray. Jess Harnell replaces the retired Earl Boen as the voice of LeChuck.

==== Other appearances ====
Stan's Used Coffins is referred to in one of the levels of the LucasArts game Outlaws. In Indiana Jones and the Infernal Machine, Guybrush can be accessed as a playable character via a cheat code; in addition, a Monkey Island-themed secret room can be found in the game's final level. Guybrush also appears in Star Wars: The Force Unleashed II as a playable skin for Starkiller named "Guybrush Threepkiller".

Guybrush is paid homage in the Naughty Dog video game Uncharted 4: A Thief's End, where a pirate with major similarities to Guybrush is featured as one of the twelve pirate captains that founded Libertalia. Although he remains unnamed throughout the game, the resemblance is uncanny and his sigil is represented by a monkey. His portrait can be seen in the Libertalia treasury with the other founders and though his name is partly scratched out, the letters still visible spell out the truncated name "Guy Wood".

Several elements from the Monkey Island series appear in Sea of Thieves as part of its June 2021 "A Pirate's Life" update. Developed in collaboration with Disney and primarily themed after Pirates of the Caribbean, multiple references to the characters and locales from the Monkey Island franchise can be found in journals by Kate Capsize scattered around the wreckage of The Headless Monkey during the update's first Tall Tale, accompanied by an original arrangement of the Monkey Island theme. According to the journals, Guybrush and Elaine Threepwood are celebrating their honeymoon somewhere upon the Sea of Thieves, while Kate perished attempting to get revenge on Guybrush for framing her.

A full Monkey Island-themed expansion for the game, "The Legend of Monkey Island", was released on July 20, 2023 and spread across three monthly episodes. In the story, set between Curse and Escape, Guybrush and Elaine's honeymoon on the Sea of Thieves is interrupted by LeChuck, who traps them in a dream version of Mêlée Island where everyone worships Guybrush as a legendary pirate. To stop LeChuck from restoring the legendary Burning Blade and conquering the Sea of Thieves, the Pirate Lord recruits the now-revived Kate Capsize and the player pirates to enter the dreamworld and rescue Guybrush and Elaine.

In an update to Hitman 3, a new pirate-themed map was added, which featured an Easter Egg referencing Monkey Island in the form of a gravestone in the environment reading "G Threepwood, Mighty Pirate", a clear reference to Guybrush.

In The Witcher 3: Wild Hunt, while completing the 'Fists of Fury' quest in the Blood and Wine expansion patch, the protagonist Geralt encounters a man named Mancomb, a reference to a character of the same name in the first game of the series.

=== Cancelled film ===
Shortly after Pixar, a spinout from Lucasfilm, found success with the first Toy Story film in 1995, there had been a push across Hollywood for more digitally animated films. Lucasfilm's Industrial Light & Magic (ILM), in the midst of transitioning from practical to digital effects, offered its services for producing these films to other studios. One of the first projects they tried to work on was with Universal Pictures to revive the Universal Classic Monsters line with a film called Frankenstein and the Wolfman. While several scripts and preliminary art was produced for this film, shake-ups at Universal due to the financial failure of Babe: Pig in the City led to changes in leadership for the film and ultimately its cancellation.

David Carson, who had been set to direct Frankenstein and the Wolfman but left after the Universal shake-up, came back to ILM with the idea of an animated film based on the first Monkey Island game around 2000. With initial support from ILM, Carson worked an initial script with Corey Rosen and Scott Leberecht as to pitch the idea to Amblin Entertainment, the production company owned by Steven Spielberg. Spielberg had told Carson that he had previously told George Lucas that he should have made a Monkey Island movie years before, and other meetings with Amblin went well to proceed to further screenwriting work. The rest of ILM's story department was brought in to help write, including Steve Purcell, but this team worked separately from the writers that were developing the actual games, creating a disconnect between story the film was going with and the narrative already established in the video game series. As they continued to work out the screenplay, the direction of the film continued to veer further from the video game series, including at one point where Spielberg had suggested the game be about the monkeys on Monkey Island instead of the pirates. According to Carson, the lack of a creative direction at this point led to the film being shelved at ILM.

Details about the film were first revealed publicly in 2011 as part of the Monkey Island Special Edition Collection which included some of the film's concept art, storyboards, and scripts.

It had been rumored that Ted Elliott and Terry Rossio had been involved in the writing of the Monkey Island script which they subsequently used as the basis for the first Pirates of the Caribbean film. Both Elliott and Rossio had been to ILM and were shown parts of the Monkey Island script, around the same time they were working on their script for Pirates. When Pirates was released, many fans of the Monkey Island series made comparisons of parts of the film to the games, and when news of the cancelled film first arose in 2011, the potential connection of Elliott and Rossio to the Monkey Island script started. Both Carson and Rossio stated that many of the tropes in both Monkey Island and Pirates are based on the classic pirate movies and that there was no direct reuse of the cancelled Monkey Island film in Pirates.

== The "Secret" of Monkey Island ==
None of the first five games explicitly reveal the "Secret of Monkey Island". The team behind Escape from Monkey Island attempted to resolve the issue by showing that the Giant Monkey Head was actually the control room of a Giant Monkey Robot. The cut-scene in which the revelation was made is called "The Real Secret of Monkey Island".

Gilbert stated that he never told anyone what the true secret of Monkey Island is. In a 2004 interview, Gilbert stated that when the game was originally conceived, it was considered "too big", so they split it into three parts. He added that he "knows what the third [part] is" and "how the story's supposed to end", indicating that he had a definite concept of the “secret” and a conclusive third game.

The true nature of the secret is the main focus of Return to Monkey Island, with several characters competing amongst themselves in a race to discover "the Secret". The game's conclusion reveals the secret to be a novelty T-shirt earned as a prize at a pirate-themed amusement park, which has acted as the setting for all of Guybrush Threepwood’s previous adventures. Threepwood, as the game's narrator, is intentionally ambiguous as to whether this is the actual secret, even suggesting that the secret means different things to different people, and putting forth the notion that the story of the journey (and the joy of speculating about the secret with others) is more valuable than the reward itself.

After the release of Return to Monkey Island, Gilbert stated in an interview that the true secret (as conceived during development of the first installment of the series) is that Guybrush was, in fact, inside of a pirate-themed amusement park the entire time.

== Fan games ==
=== Fate of Monkey Island ===
FOMI: The second game's opening scene

Fate of Monkey Island (FOMI) is a video fangame series based on the Monkey Island series. It was developed and released in free download format by Scurvyliver Entertainment for Microsoft Windows and was created with Klik & Play. The series' name is a reference to Indiana Jones and the Fate of Atlantis. The first game was released in 1999, and the second one in 2000. However, the last chapter of the second game was never released because Scurvyliver Entertainment received a cease and desist letter from LucasArts. In December 2024, the games were streamed online on YouTube.

The games revolve around Squinky, a simple monkey from Monkey Island. In the first game, which takes place at the same time as Monkey Island 2: LeChuck's Revenge, Squinky finds out that the zombie pirate LeChuck is enslaving monkeys to build his Carnival of the Damned, and sets out to free his kin. At the end of the game, the monkeys leave Monkey Island on a ship called Sea Cucumber, tying into that ship's role in The Curse of Monkey Island. In the second game, which takes part between The Curse of Monkey Island and Escape from Monkey Island, Squinky and his friends settle down on Kaos Island, where a new monkey leader called LePhatt has emerged. LePhatt promises to bring the monkeys back home to Monkey Island, but Squinky finds out that he's actually working for LeChuck's henchman Largo LaGrande, and intends to once again enslave them. Squinky goes on a journey to Monkey Island to liberate the monkeys.

The games received modest praise from critics. A review by Adventure Classic Gaming said: "Do not expect a great work of art. It is all programmed and designed by a single person who goes by the alias Scurvyliver. Still, this does not mean the game is not fun. It is one of the few games which combines the action and adventure genres well". The International House of Mojo described FOMI as "the criterion example of fan games, mostly based on the following unique features: it got finished". The magazine PC Gamer pointed out, however, that "accolades from Monkey Island fans show just how popular and professional it was. Comments include: "You took the best adventure ever made and gave it a new life". "I get a bit depressed waiting for the next Monkey Island game to come out but FOMI really helps". And, rather ironically: "I think your games are great to play and LucasArts should be talking to you."

Monkey Island's creator Ron Gilbert stated in an interview in regards to the series's cancellation: "I like fan-fiction, to a point. And if it was up to me, I'd try to allow it as much as I could while still protecting my trademarks and copyrights".

==== Links ====
- Fate of Monkey Island download
- Fate of Monkey Island 2 download
- Music from Fate of Monkey Island 2

=== Night of the Hermit ===
NOTH: The game's opening scene

Night of the Hermit (NOTH) is a video fangame based on the Monkey Island series. It was developed and released in free download format by the Israeli developer Roy Lazarovich for Microsoft Windows and was created with Adventure Game Studio. As of 2005, the game received more than 24000 downloads.

The story revolves around Herman Toothrot, an eccentric hermit who lives on Monkey Island, who is a side character in the original Monkey Island series. The game begins with Herman receiving a message in a bottle that his grandfather died and left him a mansion on the Badger Island. However, upon arriving on the island, he finds out that the mansion has already been made into a motel called Crippled Badger Motel. Now it is up to Herman to reclaim what's rightfully his. Lazarovich said:

Herman seemed like a very interesting character to me. I thought it would be fun to get into his shoes. I figured he was getting kind of lonely on the island and would probably appreciate a change of scenery. I do not think my game is anywhere near the original games, and I never tried to shoot for that. It is simply a game made by a fan for the fans.

A review by Home of the Underdogs gave the game 7.64 out of 10, praising the game's storyline and music, but criticizing the graphics and overly complicated puzzles.

==== Links ====
- Download Night of the Hermit

=== The Devil's Triangle ===
A screenshot from The Devil's Triangle

The Devil's Triangle is a Klik & Play fan game by Chris Ushko aka Datadog (also known for working on Space Quest: Vohaul Strikes Back and The Silver Lining), based on Ushko's eponymous fanfic.

It takes place in-between The Secret of Monkey Island and Monkey Island 2: LeChuck's Revenge, and begins with Guybrush stranded on Keelhaul Island in search of the Big Whoop treasure. He meets Captain Walker who is in possession of a Big Whoop map, according to which the treasure is in the Bermuda Triangle. Soon after that, Walker is killed by the menacing pirate Sharkjaw and his crew of rat pirates, and Guybrush teams up with Walker's daughter Jan to defeat Sharkjaw and find Big Whoop.

Adventure Archiv gave The Devil's Triangle 70 out of 100, appreciating the game's comedy aspect and graphics.

==== Links ====
- Download The Devil's Triangle
- The original fanfic

=== The Treasure of Drunk Island ===
Cover image of The Treasure of Drunk Island

The Treasure of Drunk Island is a 1999 video game developed by Edmundo Ruiz-Ghanem (also known as Netmonkey) with the use of Klik & Play. Though formally an original work, it's strongly inspired by the Monkey Island universe.

The story revolves around William "Willy" Alexander who has been fascinated by the legend of the treasure of Drunk Island since his childhood. After losing his job, he discovers a treasure map in his office, and decides (along with his brother Danny) to fulfill his dream and find the treasure. In order to do this, he needs to open a portal to teleport from his home Polar Island to the Drunk Island.

A review by Home of the Underdogs gave the game a 7 out of 10, praising the plot and graphics, but criticizing the lack of object descriptions and hotspots. Gaming website Acid-Play gave the game a 65 out of 100.

==== Links ====
- Download The Treasure of Drunk Island

=== The Mistery of Maniac Island ===
The cover of The Mistery of Maniac Island

The Mistery of Maniac Island is a series of Italian fan games made in Klik & Play by Danilo Lapegna (also known as Voodoomaster).

The story takes place during the events of Monkey Island 2: LeChuck's Revenge, but shown from the perspective of the villain, zombie pirate LeChuck. The first game begins with LeChuck resurrected as a zombie - however, the resurrection spell goes awry, and LeChuck is warned that he will die in four days unless he locates an incredibly potent source of magical power located on Maniac Island. LeChuck also encounters a powerful adversary: an evil zombie doppelganger of Guybrush. In the second game Maniac Island 2: Il sogno di un pirata (The Dream of a Pirate), LeChuck, together with another pirate Finklemann, searches for a magic mirror to conquer Elaine's love; he also gets to visit the Edisons' mansion from Day of the Tentacle. Finally, in the third game Maniac Island 3: L'ultima avventura di LeChuck (The Last Adventure of LeChuck), LeChuck dies for the second time during the explosion of his fortress, and ends up in the afterlife.

The games were covered by the Italian gaming magazine The Games Machine.

==== Links ====
- Download The Mistery of Maniac Island
- Download Maniac Island 2: Il sogno di un pirata
- Download Maniac Island 3: L'ultima avventura di LeChuck
- Maniac Island Trading Card Game

=== The Secret of Mount Monkey ===
The Secret of Mount Monkey is an abandoned fan game project by Sebastian Beloch aka Sebel. It was to be a crossover game about Guybrush and Elaine's daughter Lorraine Threepwood, who is one day visited by Simon the Sorcerer. Simon tells her about a dangerous object in the sky, and she goes on a journey to avert the calamity, meeting her father (who is now the owner of the Scumm Bar), her friends from the Maniac Mansion, her former lover Indiana Jones, and visiting the worlds of Zak McKracken, Sam & Max Hit the Road, and Leisure Suit Larry.

There was also an offshoot project by Sascha Lindebaum aka Skyhawk, called "Lorraine Threepwood and the Curse of Tafkasomm" ("Tafkasomm" standing for "The Adventure Formally Known As Secret Of Mount Monkey"). It featured basically the same storyline, but different graphic style more similar to The Curse of Monkey Island.

==== Links ====
- Demo versions

=== Al Gurbish in... Nick it & Run!!! ===
A screenshot from Al Gurbish in... Nick it & Run!!!, an adventure game exhibition with many references to classic LucasArts and Sierra On-Line titles

Al Gurbish in... Nick it & Run!!! is a 2003 video game, made with Adventure Game Studio by the Australian developer Pedro Scribe (AussieSoft).

It revolves around Al Gurbish, the worst agent in the Secret Service of the City of Thathurst. Al Gurbish is given an assignment to steal "The Stan's", the most prestigious award in the world of adventure gaming (named after the character Stan in Monkey Island), in order to prevent it from being stolen by criminals.

An Adventure Gamers review by Dave Gilbert praised the game for its similarity to classic LucasArts titles. Gilbert said: "If one were to box up Nick It & Run, slap on a LucasArts logo, send it back in time to 1992 and put it on an department store shelf, it would be perfectly at home. I can't think of any higher praise than that". A review by Abandonware gave the game a 4.5 out of 5, praising the graphics and puzzles, although noting some bugs.

==== Links ====
- Download Al Gurbish in... Nick it & Run!!!

=== The Amulet of Monkey Island ===
The Amulet of Monkey Island (El Amuleto de Monkey Island) was a Spanish Monkey Island fan project by Guido Sirna and his company Metamorfo Entertainment. In 2008, it was cancelled because the company received a cease and desist letter from Telltale Games, who were at that moment working on Tales of Monkey Island.

The game would begin with Guybrush's ship Smelly Chimpanzee attacked by pirates, and Guybrush ending up shipwrecked on an island. Once there, he would start a journey to discover the real Secret of Monkey Island.

==== Links ====
- Archived website
- Trailer
- An overview by Guido Sirna

=== The Booze of Monkey Island ===
The Booze of Monkey Island is a video fangame based on the Monkey Island series. It was developed by Bean Adventure Agency and released in free download format.

The story revolves around Guybrush Threepwood - stranded on Booty Island - who must convince Kate Capsize, Wally B. Feed and William the Swiss to enter the pub of Ignatius Cheese. Ignatius Cheese will then help Guybrush with repairing last one's ship so Guybrush can rescue Elaine out of the hands of LeChuck.

==== Links ====
- Official website

== See also ==
- LucasArts adventure games
- SCUMM
- ScummVM
