= Denny Delk =

American actor

- Born: May 28, 1950 (age 76)
- Occupation: Actor
- Years active: 1979–present
- Agent: Tisherman Gilbert Motley Drozdoski Talent Agency
- Spouse: Karen Jones
- Website: http://www.dennydelk.com

Denny Delk (born May 28, 1950) is an American actor. He is best known for providing the voice of Murray in the Monkey Island series as well as a range of voices in LucasArts games.

== Background and career ==
Delk learned a knack of acting from his mother, who read bedtime stories to him and had done all voices of characters. After getting education at University of St. Andrews, he worked as a disc jockey and later got in radio, and then into commercials. In the 1970s he worked with George Lucas for first time, playing a minor role in More American Graffiti for Lucasfilm. He voiced the medical droid 2-1B in The Empire Strikes Back, and later played roles for LucasFilm in Star Wars: Ewoks (the voice of Wicket in the second season) and in Howard the Duck. Then, in 1992, he became associated with LucasArts, voicing the "talkie" version of Indiana Jones and the Fate of Atlantis. He continued working for LucasArts as in-house actor, voicing many roles in their games, although players know Delk most for playing the talking skull Murray from Monkey Island series of quests. Delk tried to make the character a little more comical than he was and tried to give him a bit of himself.

Delk is a freelance voice-over artist, but his name is mostly associated with LucasArts. He also has years of improv experience. Delk was also the spokesman for the long-running Got Milk? series of commercials.

== Personal life ==
Delk lives in San Francisco Bay Area. His wife is writer and producer Karen Jones Delk.

== Known works ==
=== Films ===
Year	Title	Role	Notes
1979	More American Graffiti	Police Sergeant	
1980	The Empire Strikes Back	2-1B	uncredited
1986	Howard the Duck	Sergeant	
1987	P.K. and the Kid	Deputy	
1993	Golden Gate	Jury foreman	
1994	You Not Chinese	Charlie Chan	
1997	Farmer & Chase	Capt. Cornell	

=== Video games ===
Year	Video game	Role	Notes
1992	Indiana Jones and the Fate of Atlantis	Omar Al-Jabbar, Nazi U-boat Captain, Nazi	CD-ROM version
1993	Day of the Tentacle	Hoagie, Purple Tentacle, other voices	
1993	Sam & Max Hit the Road	Lee Harvey, other voices	
1994	Star Wars: TIE Fighter	Admiral Zaarin, Priest, Ripoblus Population	
1995	Full Throttle	Maximum Fish, Blotch	
1997	Star Wars Jedi Knight: Dark Forces II	8t88	
1997	The Curse of Monkey Island	Murray, Skully, Father Pirate	
1998	Star Wars: Rogue Squadron	Narrator, Other Rogue Members	uncredited
1999	Star Wars: X-Wing Alliance	Admiral Zaarin	
2000	Escape from Monkey Island	Murray, Mister Santiago	
2000	Star Wars: Early Learning Activity Center	Slingshot Announcer	
2001	007: Agent Under Fire	Nigel Bloch	
2001	Star Wars: Rogue Squadron II: Rogue Leader	Narrator	
2003	Star Wars: Rogue Squadron III: Rebel Strike	Narrator, Commander 2, Wingman 7	
2006	Star Wars: Empire at War	Narrator	
2009	Tales of Monkey Island	Murray	
2009	The Secret of Monkey Island: Special Edition	Narrator, Pirate Leader III, Citizen of Mêlée	
2010	Iron Man 2	AIM agent, Roxxon agent	
2010	Monkey Island 2 Special Edition: LeChuck's Revenge	Narrator, Bruno, Fred, Larry, Voodoo Priest	
2022	Return to Monkey Island	Murray	
2023	Sea of Thieves	Murray, Pirate Leader III, Citizen of Mêlée	
