= Elaine Marley =

Fictional character in Monkey Island

Elaine Marley-Threepwood
- Monkey Island character
- Elaine Marley in Tales of Monkey Island
- First appearance: The Secret of Monkey Island (1990)
- Created by: Ron Gilbert
- Voiced by: Alexandra Boyd; Charity James (Escape from Monkey Island)

Elaine Marley (from Escape From Monkey Island onward called Elaine Marley-Threepwood) is a character in the Monkey Island series of graphic adventure video games. Created by Ron Gilbert for LucasArts, the character first appears in The Secret of Monkey Island and is one of the core characters in the franchise. Originally conceived as a ruthless island governor, the character evolved during development into the protagonist's love interest. While the first two games in the series did not feature voice acting, Elaine was voiced by Alexandra Boyd in The Curse of Monkey Island and by Charity James in Escape from Monkey Island; Boyd would reprise the role for later entries in the franchise.

Elaine is the governor of the Tri-Island Area, a fictional group of pirate islands in the Caribbean. She is loved by the undead pirate LeChuck, but instead falls in love with hapless protagonist Guybrush Threepwood. She eventually marries Guybrush and relinquishes her gubernatorial responsibilities to her grandfather.

The character has enjoyed positive critical reception. Several sources commended Elaine's aberration of the damsel in distress stereotype. Elaine has been ranked on a number of lists regarding the best female characters in the video game industry, and has received praise for her visual design and resilient personality. Critics have also complimented Boyd's and James' voice acting for the character in the later installments of the series, though some expressed disappointment at the character's reduced lines in The Curse of Monkey Island.

== Character design ==
The original script for The Secret of Monkey Island called for a character simply named "the Governor"; Monkey Island creator Ron Gilbert had envisioned her as a far more ruthless character. The name "Elaine" was created later in development by Dave Grossman, who wrote the final scenes of the game in which protagonist Guybrush Threepwood disrupts the wedding of antagonist LeChuck and the governor. One of Grossman's options for gatecrashing the wedding is having Guybrush scream "Elaine!" in a parody of a similar scene in the 1967 film The Graduate; Gilbert appreciated the reference, so Elaine was adopted as the governor's name. As development on the game further progressed, the character evolved from being a ruthless governor to the player character's love interest. When the player talks to a number of characters in The Secret of Monkey Island, a close-up portrait of the character is shown. Elaine's appearance in this portrait was based on Avril Harrison, an artist working at LucasArts. Gilbert always felt bothered by these close-up portraits, stating that "while they were great art, I never felt they matched the style of the rest of the game".

In The Curse of Monkey Island, Elaine realises that Guybrush is her true love, and marries him. However, Ron Gilbert did not intend for the relationship between the characters to develop in this way, stating that Elaine "never really liked Guybrush and thought of him as more of a little brother". Gilbert was not involved in the production of The Curse of Monkey Island; while thinking that the new development team "did a pretty good job of capturing what Monkey Island was about", the relationship between Elaine and Guybrush "was the thing that bugged [Gilbert] the most about The Curse of Monkey Island".

The Curse of Monkey Island was the first Monkey Island game to feature voice acting; in it, the part of Elaine Marley was given to British actress Alexandra Boyd. Boyd explains that she got the part of Elaine as she had worked with voice director Darragh O'Farrell previously; O'Farrell brought Boyd in to read for the part. Boyd joked that "I figured I got the part because I have red hair like her". Boyd was not contacted to return as the character for Escape from Monkey Island; Elaine was instead voiced by American actress Charity James. Nevertheless, Boyd reprised the role for Telltale Games' Tales of Monkey Island and the later enhanced remakes of the first two games. Boyd was glad to return, stating that the character "is very well written and it's fun doing all that shouting at LeChuck and Guybrush! Exhausting but fun". The development of Elaine's character was one of Gilbert's aims for Tales of Monkey Island; Gilbert wanted Elaine to "be better informed and more capable than most of the other characters". In Return to Monkey Island, Ron Gilbert told Eurogamer that "We actually had a very, very early incarnation of the game where their relationship was a little bit on rocky ground... they weren't divorced, but they were definitely not getting along. But when we did our first play test, man, people hated that! They absolutely hated that".

=== Attributes and depiction ===
Elaine is depicted with red hair and green eyes. She wears a variety of pirate clothing consistent with the game's Golden Age of Piracy setting. Her appearances in The Secret of Monkey Island and Monkey Island 2: LeChuck's Revenge are in the form of pixel art, with appearances slightly differing between the EGA, Amiga and VGA versions of the games. By The Curse of Monkey Island, Elaine is rendered in a cartoon art style by LucasArts artists Larry Ahern and Bill Tiller, although the character's choice of clothing remains consistent.

== Appearances ==
Elaine's original close-up portrait in The Secret of Monkey Island was modelled after LucasArts artist Avril Harrison. However, creator Ron Gilbert felt that these portraits did not match the art style of the rest of the game. The later Special Edition took a more stylized approach that was consistent with the rest of the artwork.

Elaine Marley debuts in The Secret of Monkey Island as the governor of Mêlée Island, on which protagonist Guybrush Threepwood is striving to become a pirate. As governor, she attracts many suitors, one of these being the pirate captain LeChuck. LeChuck's ambitions for Elaine's hand in marriage form a major part of the franchise's plot.

Elaine's role is significantly reduced for the sequel Monkey Island 2: LeChuck's Revenge, though the majority of the story is conveyed by Guybrush to Elaine in the form of a flashback. Between the games, the two have broken off their relationship and Elaine has moved to her governor's mansion on Booty Island. When Guybrush appears at the mansion, she presumes he has come to apologize; instead he is looking for a map that belonged to Elaine's grandfather. After discovering Guybrush's intentions, Elaine is infuriated and refuses to speak to him.

In The Curse of Monkey Island, LeChuck's efforts to buy Elaine's love are again rebuked by Elaine, who is angry at LeChuck for having apparently killed Guybrush, who she realises is the true love of her life. Guybrush attempts to propose to her, but accidentally gives her a cursed ring that turns her to solid gold. Guybrush eventually removes the curse, and the two marry and leave on their honeymoon.

Elaine and Guybrush return to Mêlée Island in Escape from Monkey Island from their lengthy honeymoon to find that she has been declared legally dead; as a result, the governorship of the Tri-Island Area is up for election. Elaine and Guybrush must reverse her legal demise.

In Tales of Monkey Island, Elaine is once again kidnapped by LeChuck. While events separate Guybrush and Elaine, she befriends the now seemingly unmalicious LeChuck, and helps him return monkeys used for his voodoo spells to their homes. Elaine also attempts, without success, to arbitrate between merpeople with access to a cure for the pox and infected pirates.

In Return to Monkey Island, Elaine heads up an anti-scurvy initiative and shadows Guybrush through the game as witness to his misadventures. In the game's frame story, an older Elaine visits a theme park with Guybrush and their son, Boybrush.

Outside the Monkey Island series, Elaine appears in Sea of Thieves as part of the expansion "The Legend of Monkey Island". Set between Curse and Escape, LeChuck intercepts Guybrush and Elaine during their honeymoon and traps them in a dreamworld. Aware of the deception, Elaine departs on her own to find a way to free them.

== Reception ==
The character of Elaine Marley has garnered a positive reception from critics within the video game industry. Described by GameSpot as the impetus for the whole series, critics lauded Elaine's non-conformity to the damsel in distress stereotype. GameSpot noted that Elaine is usually much more proficient at escaping trouble "than the so-called hero who comes to save her", while the video game culture journal Eludamos approved of the character for allowing a level of "feminine expression which did not necessary always conform to passive ideals of the damsel in distress".

In 100 Greatest Video Game Characters, Elaine is cited as more important than Guybrush due to her pivotal role in the depiction of women in video games. The book highlighted her political power and gender-neutral attire as rare, and mentioned that she subverts the idea of the love interest in video games by being more successful and level-headed than the protagonist, while having her own ambitions. As such, she was compared to Alyx Vance from the Half-Life series and Grace Nakamura from Gabriel Knight, amongst others.

IGN India, The Guardian, and GamesRadar+ all stated that Elaine and Guybrush were one of the best video game couples, Eurogamer commended Elaine's design as "worthy of acclaim", naming her the "Best Female Supporting Character" in their 2001 annual Gaming Globes awards, while IGN described her alongside Guybrush and LeChuck as one of "the most beloved adventure characters of all time". Alexandra Boyd and Charity James too have been praised for their voicing of Elaine; Computer Games Magazine described Boyd's work for The Curse of Monkey Island as "wonderful", though lamented that she did not speak more in the game, while Macworld admired the character's depiction in Escape from Monkey Island as "beautiful and plucky". TheGamer lamented Elaine's perceived tonal shift in Return to Monkey Island, saying that she was "Elaine in name and appearance only", and had been "demoted" to a background role.
