= Guybrush Threepwood =

Monkey Island character

- Monkey Island character
- Guybrush Threepwood in Tales of Monkey Island
- First game: The Secret of Monkey Island (1990)
- Created by: Ron Gilbert
- Designed by: Steve Purcell
- Voiced by: Dominic Armato

Guybrush Ulysses Threepwood is a fictional character who serves as the main protagonist of the Monkey Island series of computer adventure games by LucasArts. He is a pirate who adventures throughout the Caribbean in search of fame and treasure alongside his love interest and later wife, Elaine Marley, often thwarting the plans of the undead pirate LeChuck in the process. Though a "mighty pirate" by his own account, he is a rather clumsy and disorganized protagonist throughout the series. It is a running joke throughout the games for characters to garble Guybrush Threepwood's unusual name, either deliberately or accidentally. In all voiced appearances, Guybrush is voiced by actor Dominic Armato.

== Conception and design ==
The origin of the name "Guybrush" comes in part from Deluxe Paint, the raster graphics editor used by the artists to create the character sprite. Since the character had no name hitherto, the file was simply called "Guy". When the file was saved, Steve Purcell, the artist responsible for the sprite, added "brush" to the filename, indicating that it was the Deluxe Paint "brush file" for the "Guy" sprite. The file name was then guybrush.bbm, so the developers eventually just started referring to this unnamed 'Guy' as "Guybrush". Guybrush's surname "Threepwood" was decided upon in a company contest and is derived from P. G. Wodehouse's family of characters including Galahad Threepwood and Freddie Threepwood (with whom he shares similar characteristics). "Threepwood" is also rumoured to have been the name of Dave Grossman's RPG character.

== Appearances ==
Guybrush is introduced in The Secret of Monkey Island, where he travels to Mêlée Island in hopes of becoming a pirate. Over the course of his journey, he falls in love with the island's governor, Elaine Marley, and works with her to destroy the ghost pirate LeChuck. In Monkey Island 2: LeChuck's Revenge, Guybrush goes on a quest for the legendary treasure of Big Whoop, which is needed to destroy the reanimated zombie LeChuck. In The Curse of Monkey Island, Guybrush works to defeat LeChuck once more and lift a curse from Elaine, with the two marrying at the game's conclusion. In Escape from Monkey Island, Guybrush must help Elaine be reelected as governor and prevent the corporate takeover of the Caribbean. In Tales of Monkey Island, Guybrush accidentally releases a voodoo pox, and must team up with an allegedly reformed LeChuck to cure Elaine and the rest of the Caribbean. In Return to Monkey Island, an older Guybrush tells his and Elaine's young son, Boybrush, about an adventure in which he and LeChuck race to find the supposed "Secret of Monkey Island".

In Indiana Jones and the Infernal Machine, Guybrush can be accessed as a playable character via a cheat code; in addition, a secret room hidden in the game's final level temporarily transforms the player into Guybrush. Guybrush also appears in Sea of Thieves as part of the expansion "The Legend of Monkey Island". Set between Curse and Escape, Guybrush and Elaine honeymoon in the Sea of Thieves, but they are intercepted by LeChuck, who traps them in a dream based on Mêlée Island to prevent them from stopping his latest scheme.

== Promotion and reception ==
Symbiote Studios and LucasArts have made a statue which features Guybrush Threepwood facing off against LeChuck in a fight. In Star Wars: The Force Unleashed II, a skin called "Guybrush Threepkiller" based on the character is included.

IGN thought Guybrush was one of the few characters that would be strong enough to carry their own movie franchise, calling him "delightfully amusing" and noting that humour was one of his defining traits. Guybrush was included in GameSpot's vote for the all-time greatest video game hero. Guybrush was eliminated in the first round when facing off against Wander from Shadow of the Colossus, garnering 46.5% of the votes. Empire listed Guybrush as the seventh top greatest video game character, saying that he was "[a]rguably the most-loved character in point and click adventure gaming history". UGO Networks listed Guybrush as one of their best heroes of all time. When detailing pirates, UGO also called Guybrush "[t]he perfect protagonist for a light-hearted pirate adventure". Tom Chatfield, writing for The Observer, listed Guybrush as one of the 10 best video game characters, characterizing Guybrush as "an unforgettable presence in countless nascent gaming lives, from his knobbly knees to his less-than-silky sword skills". Guybrush also was listed in the Guinness World Records as the 38th top video game character. In 2012, GamesRadar ranked him as the 10th best hero in video games, adding "he may not be the most intimidating of protagonists[...], he gets by with his sharp wit and resourcefulness", and that "he's not only an unlikely pirate, but also an unlikely hero". In 2021, Rachel Weber of GamesRadar ranked Guybrush as 30th of their "50 iconic video game characters". HobbyConsolas included Guybrush on their "The 30 best heroes of the last 30 years". During the 26th Annual D.I.C.E. Awards, the writing and vocal performance of Guybrush Threepwood in Return to Monkey Island received a nomination for "Outstanding Achievement in Character".
