= Moop and Dreadly in the Treasure on Bing Bong Island =

2002 video game

- Developer: Hulabee Entertainment
- Publisher: Plaid Banana Entertainment
- Producer: Aimee Paganini
- Designers: Lisa Wick; Edward Pun
- Writer: Dave Grossman
- Composer: Ben Hochberg
- Platforms: Windows, Macintosh
- Release: March 18, 2002
- Genres: Adventure, Edutainment

Moop and Dreadly in the Treasure on Bing Bong Island is a 2002 point-and-click adventure game produced by Hulabee Entertainment and published by Plaid Banana Entertainment.

== Plot ==
In their first adventure, Dreadly has a map that shows the location of buried treasure on Bing Bong Island, and he drags Moop along to help him find it. Of course, the villainous pirate Captain James Trench wants the treasure too and sends his bumbling henchmen to dig it up first.

== Synopsis ==
The game begins with Moop reading a book on an island before his friend Captain Dreadly interrupts by picking him up on his ship and telling him about a piece of a map to the treasure of Bing Bong Island which he has found. The two then make their way to Bing Bong Island by crash landing their boat onto the island. It's here where they meet Chief Earwig who, after a trial, gives them the other half of the map. Moop and Captain Dreadly venture forth to find the treasure.

After searching, they see the pirate Captain James Trench, who is also after the treasure. Moop and Dreadly find the treasure and the Chief's daughter, Princess Connie before being captured by Captain Trench.

The three escape with the treasure and are chased before dropping the treasure into a volcano. Captain Dreadly, Princess Connie, Moop and Captain Trench all make attempts to get the treasure from a rock in the middle of the volcano. The rest of the island's residents turn up and warn them the volcano is about to erupt before helping them get the treasure and escaping. The volcano erupts and Captain Trench is assumed to have escaped as well although not seen again.

The game then has two endings, the first is to leave the island with the Golden Glockenspiel (the treasure) or to give it to Chief Earwig and Princess Connie. If the player chooses the first option they leave with the Glockenspiel and find that it's fake gold, if they give it to the villagers, they tell them the treasure was fake and give them real gold to leave with.

In either ending you see Moop and Dreadly wave off and see them sail away to their next adventure.

== Gameplay ==
The game allows the player to pick up items, go to different locations, listen to characters, and find trivial click points. Clicking on an item allows the player to drag it over the screen. Clicking on a certain place while holding an object allows our heroes to use it. Most puzzles require the player to make exchanges with characters and trade items.

== Development ==
Moop & Dreadly was the second game developed by Hulabee Entertainment. It was written by Dave Grossman. Ben Hochberg was the music composer. Moop & Dreadly was designed by Edward Pun, who was also the art lead, and Lisa Wick, who was also the program lead. Aimee Paganini was the producer. Ron Gilbert was the creative director. The game was published by Plaid Banana Entertainment, a publishing label of Disney Interactive.

== Reception ==
The game has articles published on it in The Chronicle, and the New York Daily News.
