= Alexandra Boyd =

British actress, writer, director and producer

Alexandra Boyd is a British actress, director, screenwriter and producer. Her acting credits include playing Sarah Olmsted in Mr. Holland's Opus (1995) and Clarissa Mason in the 2008 season of Coronation Street. In recent years she has turned to screenwriting and film directing. She wrote and directed her debut feature Widow's Walk which debuted on Amazon Prime in December 2019.

On British TV she has appeared in several episodes of Doctors and guest starred in New Tricks and Holby City. She has been a guest on Loose Women and is the Head of the Delegation in the action film From Paris with Love (2010). Other film credits include Mr. Holland's Opus and Titanic. She wrote and directed her second film Boxer on the Wilderness.

== Early life ==
Alexandra Boyd was born to a Scottish father, David Boyd, and an English mother, Barbara Boyd (née Godbold) in Bangor, Wales. She grew up in Norwich, Norfolk, and was educated at Norwich High School for Girls. She left school at 16 to study full-time at Laine Theatre Arts in Epsom, Surrey. In 1986, she enrolled in the post graduate acting course at Drama Studio London. She co-founded a theatre company that performed Shakespeare and adapted classics for the London and Edinburgh Fringe. The company produced English plays for Italy. In the 1993 Italian tour, she played Eliza Doolittle in Pygmalion.

While living in Los Angeles, Boyd studied art history, architecture and design while training as an interior designer at UCLA. She studied with some of the foremost green architects in the United States and writes a blog about living a green and sustainable lifestyle called How Green Is Your Life.

== Acting career ==
Boyd moved back to the UK in 2006 after living in the US for seventeen years. While living and working in Los Angeles she appeared in Mr. Holland's Opus and James Cameron's Titanic.

On American TV, Boyd made appearances on Party of Five, Sabrina, the Teenage Witch and The Bernie Mac Show. She has performed voices for radio commercials and animated features such as The Wild Thornberries. She is the voice of Elaine Marley in The Curse of Monkey Island, Tales of Monkey Island, Return to Monkey Island and the special editions of The Secret of Monkey Island and Monkey Island 2: LeChuck's Revenge.

On British TV, she played Clarissa Mason on Coronation Street (Granada TV) and Dennis Waterman's love interest in an episode of New Tricks (BBC). She has guest starred in several episodes of BBC1's Doctors and Holby City.

Her theatre credits range from Shakespeare to panto; many Alan Ayckbourn plays; Rita in Educating Rita and Eliza Doolittle in Pygmalion. In 2007 she produced and performed in a one-woman show at the Hackney Empire.

In November 2009 she co-starred with Danny Webb in Visiting Hours, a short film written for her and directed by Steve Hughes. The film played at the Milan International Film Festival 2010 and the Los Angeles Short Film Festival 2010 and Encounters 2010 in Bristol.

Boyd plays the Chief of Delegation in the Luc Besson film From Paris with Love.

== Writer and director ==
Boyd started her production company New Thirty Pictures in 2013. She wrote, directed and produced her debut feature film, a supernatural thriller called Widow's Walk. It is set and shot in her Suffolk. The film launched on Amazon Prime Video in December 2019.

Her second feature is a documentary, Ship of Dreams, an exploration of her time on James Cameron's Titanic alongside her fellow supporting actors through the diaries Boyd asked them to write in 1998 during and after shooting the film.

She has written, directed and crowdfunded a number of short films, including Boxer on the Wilderness. It screened at 15 international film festivals.

== Film festivals ==
In October 2019 Widow's Walk world premiered at the Chelsea Film Festival in New York where it won the award for Best Cinematography (DP Alex Veitch).

In May 2014, Boxer on the Wilderness screened in the British Independent Film Festival at the Empire Leicester Square and was nominated for Best Short Film and Best Cinematography. The film screened at the East End Film Festival at Stratford East Playhouse and nine additional international film festivals during 2014/15 including the Underwire Film Festival in London, Hollyshorts in Los Angeles, Bornshorts in Denmark, The Portland Film Festival in Portland, Oregon and The Chelsea Film Festival in New York. It won the Mention d'Honnuer at the "Sport Movies & TV - Milano International FICTS Fest" in December 2014.

== Filmography ==
=== Film ===
Year	Title	Role	Notes
1995	Mr. Holland's Opus	Sarah Olmstead	
1997	Titanic	1st Class Woman	Uncredited
2002	The Adventures of Tom Thumb and Thumbelina	Bertha Beetle (voice)	Direct-to-video
2002	The Wild Thornberrys Movie	Victoria (voice)	
2002	100 Mile Rule	English Escort	
2010	From Paris with Love	Head of the Delegation	
2013	Elysium	Sonra / Narrator	

=== Television ===
Year	Title	Role	Notes
1985	Screen Two	Marjory Ling	Episode: "The Burston Rebellion"
1988	Boon	First Pupil	Episode: "Honourable Service"
1996	Party of Five	Ms. Esser	Episode: "Unfair Advantage"
1996	Nowhere Man	Wallace's Aide	Episode: "Gemini"
2002	Sabrina the Teenage Witch	The Rose Lady	Episode: "I Think I Love You"
2003	The Wild Thornberrys	Stella / Maid (voice)	2 Episodes
2003	The Bernie Mac Show		Episode: "Nut Job"
2008-2012	Doctors	Jane Finch / Yvonne Leyton / Nora Clarke	3 Episodes
2008	Coronation Street	Clarissa Mason	24 Episodes
2009	New Tricks	Melissa	Episode: "The Truth is Out There"
2010	Holby City	Stella Bryant	Episode: "The Last Day of Summer"

=== Video games ===
Year	Title	Role	Notes
1997	The Curse of Monkey Island	Elaine Marley / Son Pirate (voice)	
2000	Shadow Watch	Lily (voice)	
2000	Star Wars: Force Commander	Ferry Shuttle Pilot / Ruulian Citizen (voice)	
2009	Tales of Monkey Island	Elaine Marley (voice)	
2009	The Secret of Monkey Island: Special Edition	Elaine Marley (voice)	Remake of 1990 game
2010	Monkey Island 2: LeChuck's Revenge: Special Edition	Elaine Marley (voice)	Remake of 1991 game
2014	Sacred 3	Vampire (voice)	
2022	Return to Monkey Island	Elaine Marley (voice)	
