= Tales of Monkey Island =

2009 video game

- Cover artwork by Steve Purcell
- Developer: Telltale Games
- Publisher: Telltale Games
- Directors: Mike Stemmle; Mark Darin; Joe Pinney; Jake Rodkin
- Producer: Matt Hansen
- Designers: Mark Darin; Mike Stemmle; Chuck Jordan; Brendan Ferguson; Jake Rodkin; Will Armstrong; Joe Pinney; Sean Vanaman; Dave Grossman
- Programmer: Randy Tudor
- Artist: Derek Sakai
- Writers: Mike Stemmle; Mark Darin; Sean Vanaman
- Composers: Michael Land; John Marsden
- Series: Monkey Island
- Engine: Telltale Tool
- Platforms: Windows, Wii, OS X, PlayStation 3, iOS
- Release: Windows episodes July 7, 2009 – December 8, 2009; Wii episodes: NA: July 27, 2009 – February 1, 2010; PAL: July 31, 2009 – February 19, 2010; OS X February 11, 2010; PlayStation 3: NA: June 15, 2010; PAL: June 16, 2010; iOS (iPad-enhanced); December 14, 2010 – June 23, 2011 iOS; November 4, 2011 – February 23, 2012
- Genre: Graphic adventure
- Mode: Single-player

Tales of Monkey Island is a 2009 graphic adventure video game developed by Telltale Games under license from LucasArts. It is the fifth game in the Monkey Island series, released nearly a decade after the previous installment, Escape from Monkey Island. Developed for Windows and the Wii console, the game was released in five episodic segments, between July and December 2009. In contrast to Telltale's previous episodic adventure games, whose chapters told discrete stories, each chapter of Tales of Monkey Island is part of an ongoing narrative. The game was digitally distributed through WiiWare and Telltale's own website, and later through Steam and Amazon.com. Ports for OS X, the PlayStation Network, and iOS were released several months after the series ended.

Players assume the role of pirate Guybrush Threepwood, who—while attempting to destroy his nemesis, the undead pirate LeChuck—accidentally releases a voodoo pox across the Gulf of Melange. With the assistance of his wife, Elaine Marley–Threepwood, Guybrush seeks out a cure. The game was conceived in late 2008, due to renewed interest in adventure game development within LucasArts. It was developed concurrently with LucasArts' special edition of the 1990 game The Secret of Monkey Island; LucasArts oversaw production of Tales of Monkey Island, and ensured that it matched the remake in certain areas, such as art direction. Production began in early 2009; franchise creator Ron Gilbert was involved in project planning, while development was led by Dave Grossman, who co-designed the first two Monkey Island games. The game's music was composed by Michael Land, and the core cast of The Curse of Monkey Island reprised their voice roles.

Tales of Monkey Island received generally positive reviews. Critics praised the game's story, writing, humor, voice acting and characterization; 1UP.com described Guybrush as Telltale's strongest and most expressive character yet. The game's music and graphics were also lauded. Complaints focused primarily on the perceived erratic quality of the game's puzzle design, a weak supporting cast in the early chapters, and the game's control system. Tales of Monkey Island garnered several industry awards, and was Telltale's most commercially successful project until Back to the Future: The Game.

A sixth entry in the franchise, Return to Monkey Island by publisher Devolver Digital, Lucasfilm Games and Terrible Toybox, was released on September 19, 2022.

== Gameplay ==
Like its predecessors, Tales of Monkey Island is a graphic adventure game; the player assumes the role of the protagonist in an interactive story, which is driven by the exploration of the game's three-dimensional (3D) environments and by solving puzzles. These puzzles are traditional adventure game conundrums that require the player to use the environment, or items that have been found and stored inside the game's inventory, to accomplish goals. In keeping with previous Monkey Island games, Tales of Monkey Island allows players to combine certain items to create new items; for instance, the player can combine a number of voodoo ingredients with a cutlass to produce a magical cutlass.

The game world is explored with a PC keyboard and mouse, or the Wii Nunchuk's analog stick. Contrary to previous Telltale adventure games, the player holds and drags the mouse to move Guybrush, rather than point and clicking. The WASD keys or the arrow keys may instead be used to move Guybrush. Like other Monkey Island games, Tales of Monkey Island is designed to prevent the player from meeting a dead-end, such as the death of the player character. Each of the game's chapters is an estimated two to four hours in length, depending on the player's ability to solve the puzzles. A hint system can assist struggling players.

The first chapter of the game includes a "treasure hunt" mode, where the player directs Guybrush through a maze-like jungle in pursuit of hidden treasure. Found treasures translate into prizes and discounts on Telltale's website. To access this mode, the player must locate maps on the Internet, hidden on the official Telltale website and three participating Monkey Island fansites.

== Synopsis ==
=== Setting and characters ===
Tales of Monkey Island is set several years after the events of Escape from Monkey Island. The designers discarded the Tri-Island Area—the setting of the game's predecessors—in favor of a new locale: the Gulf of Melange. The game follows Guybrush Threepwood (Dominic Armato), a pirate who is naïve and hapless, yet successful. Before the game's beginning, Guybrush spends years locating the elements needed to create the Cursed Cutlass of Kaflu, a voodoo weapon capable of destroying his nemesis, the demon pirate LeChuck (Adam Harrington, Kevin Blackton and later Earl Boen). As with other Monkey Island games, LeChuck vies for the love of Elaine Marley-Threepwood (Alexandra Boyd), the wife of Guybrush Threepwood and former governor of the Tri-Island Area. In the events immediately before the game, LeChuck kidnaps Elaine, and Guybrush pursues him with the voodoo cutlass.

Several ancillary characters from earlier games in the series return in Tales of Monkey Island, including the Voodoo Lady (Alison Ewing), an enigmatic voodoo priestess who advises Guybrush in his quests; Stan (Gavin Hammon), a stereotypical salesman and business opportunist; and Murray (Denny Delk), a talking skull with delusions of grandeur. The game introduces new characters to the series, such as Morgan LeFlay (Nicki Rapp), a competent and athletic female bounty hunter who idolizes Guybrush, and Reginald Van Winslow (Roger L. Jackson), the former captain of the Screaming Narwhal who becomes Guybrush's first mate. Other additions to the cast include Coronado DeCava (Andrew Chaikin), an explorer and former lover of the Voodoo Lady, and the Marquis de Singe (Jared Emerson-Johnson), an antagonistic French nobleman and doctor.

=== Plot ===
Having acquired the components of the Cutlass of Kaflu, Guybrush races to the Rock of Gelato to save his wife from LeChuck; however, he fails to properly create the sword. When Guybrush stabs LeChuck, the flawed cutlass transforms LeChuck into a human, and infects Guybrush's hand with the "Pox of LeChuck", which gives the hand a mind of its own. An explosion on the ship hurls Guybrush into the ocean, and he later washes up on Flotsam Island. There, Guybrush encounters the Voodoo Lady, who explains that the pox will ravage the Caribbean, unless it is absorbed by a voodoo sea sponge called "La Esponja Grande" (The Big Sponge). Guybrush is advised to seek Coronado DeCava, a conquistador who is on an expedition to find La Esponja Grande; to leave the island, Guybrush must neutralize a machine that is drawing the winds inward, and thereby preventing ships from leaving. It is revealed that the Marquis de Singe is using the machine to bring pirates to the island for his medical experiments. De Singe becomes obsessed with Guybrush's hand, as he believes it to be key to eternal life. Guybrush reverts the wind patterns to normal— unwittingly causing the pox to spread across the sea —and departs in his newly acquired ship, the Screaming Narwhal. De Singe hires a pirate hunter by the name of Morgan LeFlay to capture Guybrush; en route to the Jerkbait Islands, she boards the Screaming Narwhal and cuts off Guybrush's pox-infected hand in a duel. Afterwards, she returns it to de Singe.

On the Jerkbait Islands, Guybrush finds Elaine safe, and learns that the now-human LeChuck is trying to make up for the evil deeds of his past. The three help to defend the resident merfolk city from pox-infected pirates; in return, the merfolk summon sea creatures to assist Guybrush in locating La Esponja Grande. Elaine stays behind to monitor LeChuck's actions. As Guybrush follows the creatures on the Screaming Narwhal, Morgan again boards the ship; de Singe had informed her that Guybrush's entire body was needed. Distracted by their duel, neither can react in time when the Screaming Narwhal is swallowed whole by a giant manatee.

Inside the manatee, Guybrush and LeFlay discover the crazed DeCava and his crew; Guybrush heals the manatee's injuries, and escapes with DeCava to the location of La Esponja Grande (which turns out to be much smaller than advertised). After retrieving La Esponja Grande, Morgan knocks Guybrush unconscious and sets sail for Flotsam Island with her bounty.

As Morgan reluctantly delivers Guybrush to de Singe, Guybrush is seized by the townspeople and put on trial for multiple crimes—chief among them having released the pox across the Gulf of Melange. LeChuck exonerates Guybrush by implicating himself in the creation of the pox, and produces evidence that all previous confrontations between Guybrush and LeChuck had been orchestrated by the Voodoo Lady; the two are imprisoned, and Guybrush is released. As Guybrush prepares to cure the pox with La Esponja Grande, he finds Morgan murdered in de Singe's laboratory. At the wind machine, de Singe traps Guybrush and Elaine, and believes that his experiments with Guybrush's hand are on the verge of granting him immortality. However, de Singe falls into the wind machine and is disintegrated; Guybrush then uses La Esponja Grande to absorb the pox. LeChuck arrives to free the two, but as Guybrush thanks him, LeChuck impales him on the Cutlass of Kaflu, and uses La Esponja Grande to transfer the pox's potency to himself.

Now deceased, Guybrush finds his spiritual self at the Crossroads: the place where the living and dead realms meet. With the assistance of Morgan's spirit, he finds a spell that embodies courage, anchor, direction and sacrifice, and returns to the land of the living as a ghost. LeChuck however absorbs the massive amount of energy generated by a dimensional rift Guybrush opens; the pox was engineered by LeChuck to achieve this goal. Elaine, in an apparent act of betrayal, becomes LeChuck's demon bride. Guybrush repossesses his dead body and shrinks La Esponja Grande, reversing LeChuck's hold over Elaine. LeChuck attacks Guybrush, who lures the demon pirate into the rift. There, LeChuck is simultaneously stabbed by Elaine and Morgan, which destroys his physical and spiritual forms. Stranded alone at the crossroads, Guybrush realizes that he has one more item that meets the spell's criteria for his return: Elaine's wedding ring. He uses it to restore himself to life and return to Elaine, who reveals her reason for becoming LeChuck's bride was to ensure that Guybrush would rescue her and defeat LeChuck. The spirit of Morgan delivers a jar containing the essence of LeChuck to the Voodoo Lady, in exchange for her return to the land of the living.

== Chapters ==
Chapter	Release date	
Chapter	Windows release	WiiWare release
"Launch of the Screaming Narwhal"	July 7, 2009	^{NA} July 27, 2009^{PAL} July 31, 2009
Notes: Designed by Mark Darin, Brendan Q. Ferguson, Chuck Jordan, Jake Rodkin and Michael Stemmle; Written by Michael Stemmle; After accidentally releasing a voodoo pox while attempting to permanently destroy LeChuck, Guybrush must investigate the cause of winds that are keeping ships from leaving Flotsam Island
"The Siege of Spinner Cay"	August 20, 2009	^{NA} August 31, 2009^{PAL} September 25, 2009
Notes: Designed by Will Armstrong, Mark Darin, Brendan Q. Ferguson, Chuck Jordan, Jake Rodkin and Michael Stemmle; Written by Mark Darin; Guybrush travels to the Jerkbait Islands to learn about La Esponja Grande, a voodoo sea sponge capable of curing the pox, but becomes involved in a volatile dispute between pox-infected pirates and the resident merfolk
"Lair of the Leviathan"	September 29, 2009	^{NA} October 26, 2009^{PAL} November 6, 2009
Notes: Designed by Will Armstrong, Mark Darin, Brendan Q. Ferguson, Dave Grossman, Joe Pinney, Jake Rodkin, Michael Stemmle and Sean Vanaman; Written by Sean Vanaman; After their ship is swallowed by a giant manatee, Guybrush and Morgan LeFlay must escape and secure La Esponja Grande
"The Trial and Execution of Guybrush Threepwood"	October 30, 2009	^{NA} November 30, 2009^{PAL} December 11, 2009
Notes: Designed by Will Armstrong, Mark Darin, Brendan Q. Ferguson, Dave Grossman, Joe Pinney, Jake Rodkin, Michael Stemmle and Sean Vanaman; Written by Michael Stemmle; Upon returning to Flotsam Island, Guybrush is arrested and put on trial for misdemeanors committed during his last visit
"Rise of the Pirate God"	December 8, 2009	^{NA} February 1, 2010^{PAL} February 19, 2010
Notes: Designed by Mark Darin, Dave Grossman, Jake Rodkin, Michael Stemmle and Sean Vanaman; Written by Mark Darin; Guybrush must find a way to escape the crossroads of the afterlife and thwart LeChuck's rise to power

== Development ==
=== Production ===
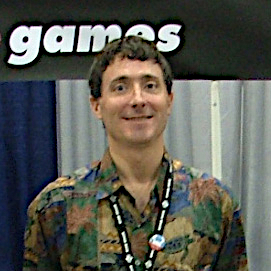
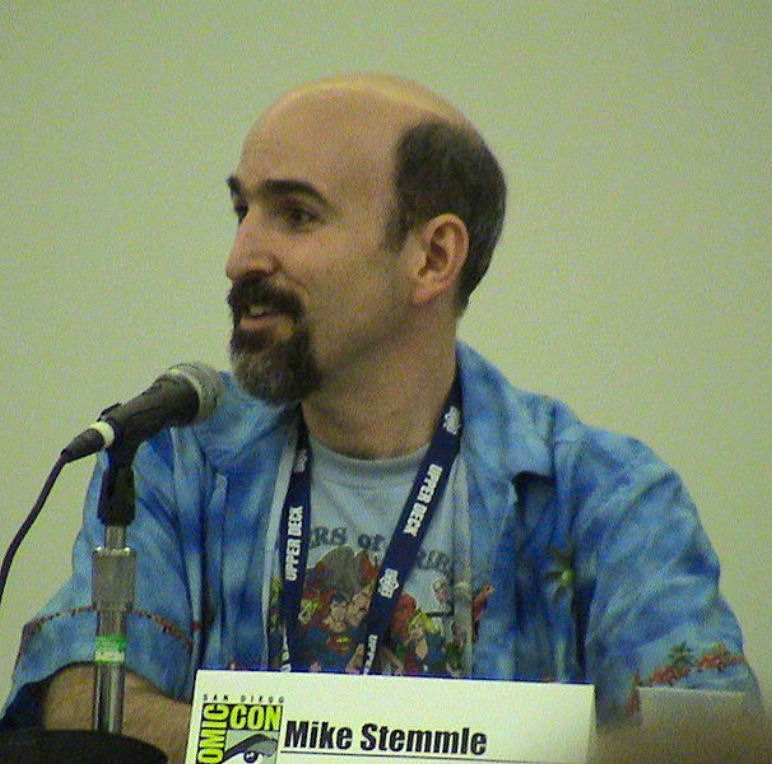
Design director Dave Grossman (left) developed the first two Monkey Island games with Ron Gilbert and Tim Schafer, while Michael Stemmle (right) co-designed the fourth game in the series.

Developed by Telltale Games, under license from LucasArts, Tales of Monkey Island marked a first collaboration between the two companies. Telltale Games had been founded by former LucasArts employees in the wake of the 2004 cancellation of Sam & Max: Freelance Police. Following that event, LucasArts appeared to have abandoned the adventure game genre. While Telltale Games had considered developing a Monkey Island game since their inception, the company's design director, Dave Grossman, credited the greenlighting of Tales of Monkey Island to the correct alignment of interested parties. This included the then-new president of LucasArts, Darrell Rodriguez, who helped push for adventure game development within his company. Mark Darin, co-designer and writer for Tales of Monkey Island, attributed the revival of interest to the rise of digital distribution within the video game industry, which—by reducing financial risk—allowed companies such as Telltale to develop "something different from the endless clones of popular games". Telltale started designing Tales of Monkey Island in late 2008; production commenced early in 2009.

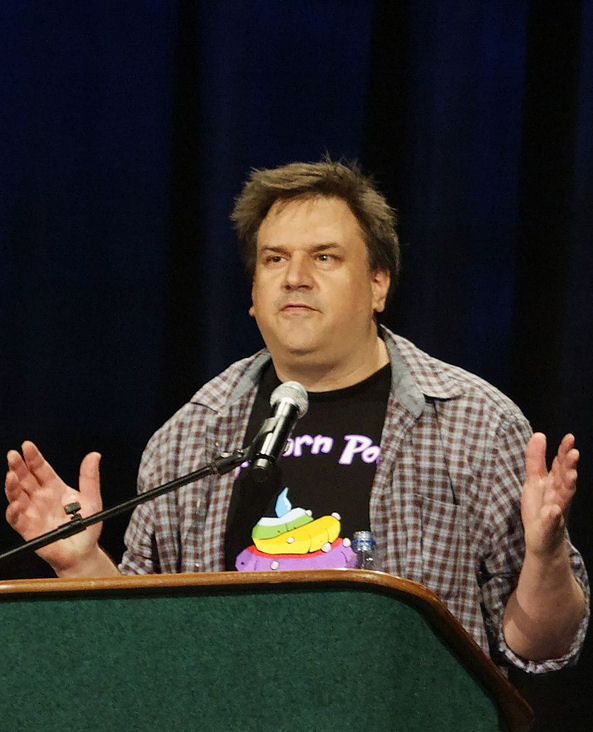
Series creator Ron Gilbert was involved in planning the project and developing the story arc.

Following hints by Telltale Games that they would soon announce a major new series, Tales of Monkey Island was unveiled at the June 2009 Electronic Entertainment Expo. Its roughly 50 person development team was headed by Dave Grossman, who co-designed the first two Monkey Island games. Escape from Monkey Island and Sam & Max Hit the Road co-designer Michael Stemmle contributed design and story writing, in collaboration with Mark Darin and Sean Vanaman. Series creator Ron Gilbert was involved in brainstorm sessions for the game, but did not have a large role in its development; the development team asserted that Gilbert's "thumbprints are all over [the game]". Tales of Monkey Island counterparts a LucasArts-developed enhanced remake of The Secret of Monkey Island. On his blog, Gilbert wrote that he was "very excited" for both Telltale's adaptation and LucasArts' reimagining of the original game, and stated that "it's strange and humbling to see something you created 20 years ago take on a life of its own".

While Gilbert and Grossman were engaged in the development of Tales of Monkey Island, the third co-designer of the original two games, Tim Schafer, was not associated with the project. Grossman said that Gilbert's leadership role at Hothead Games had made procuring his assistance "legal wrangling", and that including Schafer as well would have been too much trouble. Schafer later said that he was "really happy" for the new game, and that the project was in good hands under Grossman's lead. The game's limited-edition slipcover artwork was painted by Sam & Max creator Steve Purcell, who was responsible for the box art of both The Secret of Monkey Island and Monkey Island 2: LeChuck's Revenge. Purcell created three different rough covers to present to Telltale Games, though the company valued Purcell's own opinion on which was best. Having not been satisfied with Elaine's appearance on the cover of The Secret of Monkey Island, Purcell was keen to have another attempt to portray the character in his artwork. The final artwork, showing Guybrush and Elaine brandishing cutlasses on a ship emerging from fog, was favored as Purcell felt it was appropriately eerie.

Grossman said that the game's simultaneous release on Windows and WiiWare was due to Telltale's business model; the company alternates its game releases between WiiWare and Xbox Live Arcade, as they want to "give the Wii a little love as well". The concurrent development of the Wii version created issues; last minute changes to the PC version could put an episode over the size limit for WiiWare games. The first episode was released for Windows on July 7, 2009, with the Wii version following twenty days later. Telltale distributed the game through their own website, and later made it available for download from Steam and Amazon.com. Xbox Live was omitted from the initial release, as both Telltale's Wallace & Gromit's Grand Adventures, and LucasArts' special edition of The Secret of Monkey Island, were debuting on the system.

While Telltale had not announced plans to port Tales of Monkey Island to Mac OS, they did so on February 11, 2010; it was among the first games available for the newly released Mac OS Steam client. A PlayStation Network version was released in June 2010, due to consumer demand generated by the game's original announcement. A PlayStation 3 release had not been possible at launch, as Telltale's game engine was not built to run on the platform. An iPad-enhanced iOS port was being developed in 2010; the first episode was released on the App Store in December, and the rest of the episodes followed on June 23, 2011. As a bonus, players were offered the chance to download the first episode for free until July 22. Telltale Games has not ruled out the option of porting the game to Xbox Live and Linux. A port for the iPhone-enhanced iOS version was developed, and the first episode was released in November 2011, with the four remaining episodes that followed suit in a few months, ending with the release of Chapter 5 on February 23, 2012.

Telltale Games had gone into bankruptcy proceedings and closed down in 2018, and as a result, several of its games including Tales were pulled from digital storefronts, believed to be due to assets from Telltale being sold off to recover debt. A new version of Telltale Games was launched in late 2018 by LCG Entertainment who had acquired the remaining Telltale assets with help of Athlon Games as a financial partner, which were able to reacquire rights to the delisted games and republish them. A repackaged version of Tales under LCG Entertainment and Athlon Games reappeared on storefronts by June 2020.

=== Design ===
Art direction was one area where LucasArts collaborated with Telltale; LucasArts was keen to promote a version of Guybrush that combined the character's appearances in Monkey Island 2 and The Curse of Monkey Island, while remaining consistent with the art style of The Secret of Monkey Island special edition. LucasArts helped provide feedback and refinements for Telltale's artists to achieve this.

As with Telltale's other products, Tales of Monkey Island was developed and released in five episodic segments; Grossman explained that Telltale prefers to tell stories this way, rather than as continuous narratives that are too long for people to play comfortably. Unlike their previous games, each episode is not a standalone tale; it is a single chapter in a larger plot. This allowed Telltale to advance the story like that of a television series, in which character relationships develop in the minds of the audience over several months. Each episode is designed to be gratifying on its own, with a satisfying conclusion; however, it then provides a cliffhanger to "tantalize the player a little more". According to Grossman, Tales of Monkey Island is set after an "imaginary" Monkey Island 5, which he views as "a blockbuster, epic 40-hour gigantic experience like the earlier games". Its story would have followed Guybrush's actions in the time between Escape from Monkey Island and Tales of Monkey Island; the beginning of Tales of Monkey Island would have marked its conclusion. Grossman maintained that both the story and gameplay of Tales of Monkey Island were designed to be accessible for newcomers to the series, and commented that "knowledge of the characters and their history will add a nostalgic layer to the sly references, but is by no means necessary".

Stemmle likened the game's episodic development to a relay race, and the development of a full game, such as Escape from Monkey Island, to a "marathon". This production method meant that certain aspects, such as the game's graphics, were worked on until the release deadline. Each episode took around four months to complete. Only a few environmental resources were reused between episodes; while Telltale Games had built previous games such as Sam & Max Save the World and Wallace & Gromit's Grand Adventures around one set of locations, using the protagonists' homes and nearby streets consistently in each episode, the developers forwent such central hubs and "comfort zones" in Tales of Monkey Island, instead having each episode move off to a new primary location, only occasionally revisiting past locations. However, reusable skeletons and animations were developed for the supporting cast, including generic body types that could be visually altered to suit each character. While four of these were created, size constraints resulted in only two being included in the final game. By the game's third episode, Telltale became unsatisfied with this system, and began diversifying facial features, and providing supporting characters with unique silhouettes and animations.

Tales of Monkey Island was the first Telltale product to dedicate significant resources to cinematography. This ship battle scene presented a challenge for the developers as it was considered too static. Lighting and weather effects creating a thunderstorm, violent camera movements simulating rough waters and ship collisions and character animation suggesting strong winds were added to present a more engaging scene.

The game's artistic direction was developed by former LucasArts members Derek Sakai and Dave Bogan; both of them had worked on The Curse of Monkey Island, Escape from Monkey Island, and several earlier LucasArts adventure games. The game's final art direction was an attempt to combine the realistic look of the first two Monkey Island games with the whimsical, stylized graphics of the third. While those games feature entirely two-dimensional graphics, and their successor, Escape from Monkey Island, is largely pre-rendered, Tales of Monkey Island is rendered in full 3D. Grossman explained that both Telltale's art department and game engine are oriented toward 3D graphics development, and that the company enjoys the benefits 3D offers in the areas of animation and cinematography. Improved capacity for the latter resulted in the appointment of a "cinematic director": someone to help the designers locate scenes needing more dramatic activity, and to assist the animators and choreographers in creating it. During development, the necessity of this position was highlighted by a ship battle scene in "Launch of the Screaming Narwhal", which was initially static and unexciting. This was remedied by changing the time of day from dusk to night, adding rain and other weather effects, and using camera movement to simulate rough waters.

Regarding the puzzle design in Tales of Monkey Island, Stemmle said that he and his fellow designers—when they were younger—believed that they needed to "stump the player", but Stemmle now considers it "a lot better to make the players feel smart". Therefore, the designers included a hint system to prevent players from becoming stuck. Grossman explained that Telltale's designers would bear in mind how players would mentally progress through the puzzles, and consider "what realisations we expected them to have and whether those expectations are realistic". Due to a tight development schedule, puzzles in the first episode were not optimized for the game's control system, which was re-designed late in development. Initially, the game was to feature point-and-click controls, as had been used in the majority of Telltale's previous games, but a "direct control" method—similar to the one seen in Wallace & Gromit's Grand Adventures—was decided upon after much of the first episode had been planned. As the direct control in that game had been designed for an Xbox controller, the developers reworked the idea into a "click-and-drag" mouse system for Tales of Monkey Island. Telltale believed that this control method made for a less passive and more engaging player experience, and provided more freedom for cinematic camera work than was possible with point-and-click.

Aside from providing the Monkey Island license to Telltale, LucasArts' role in the game's development involved collaboration and approval of the game's script, character concept art and puzzle design. As the remake of The Secret of Monkey Island had begun development before Tales of Monkey Island, LucasArts shared their art style guide with Telltale, so that the two products' art direction would be similar. In particular, LucasArts wished that the character of Guybrush would be comparable to the appearance of the character in the special edition. LucasArts largely based their vision for Guybrush's new visuals in Tales of Monkey Island on how the character appeared in The Curse of Monkey Island, integrating various aspects from LeChuck's Revenge that commonly resonated through fan art, such as the character's blue coat and beard, in addition to using their own stylized art direction. Telltale concept artist Ryan Jones worked closely with LucasArts' Jeff Sengalli on developing the appearance of Guybrush and other characters, Sengalli providing feedback and refinement in such areas as character silhouettes, facial features and clothing. Vanaman noted that LucasArts was open to Telltale's creative direction for the game, and did not "put their foot down" over any aspects of their vision.

=== Audio ===
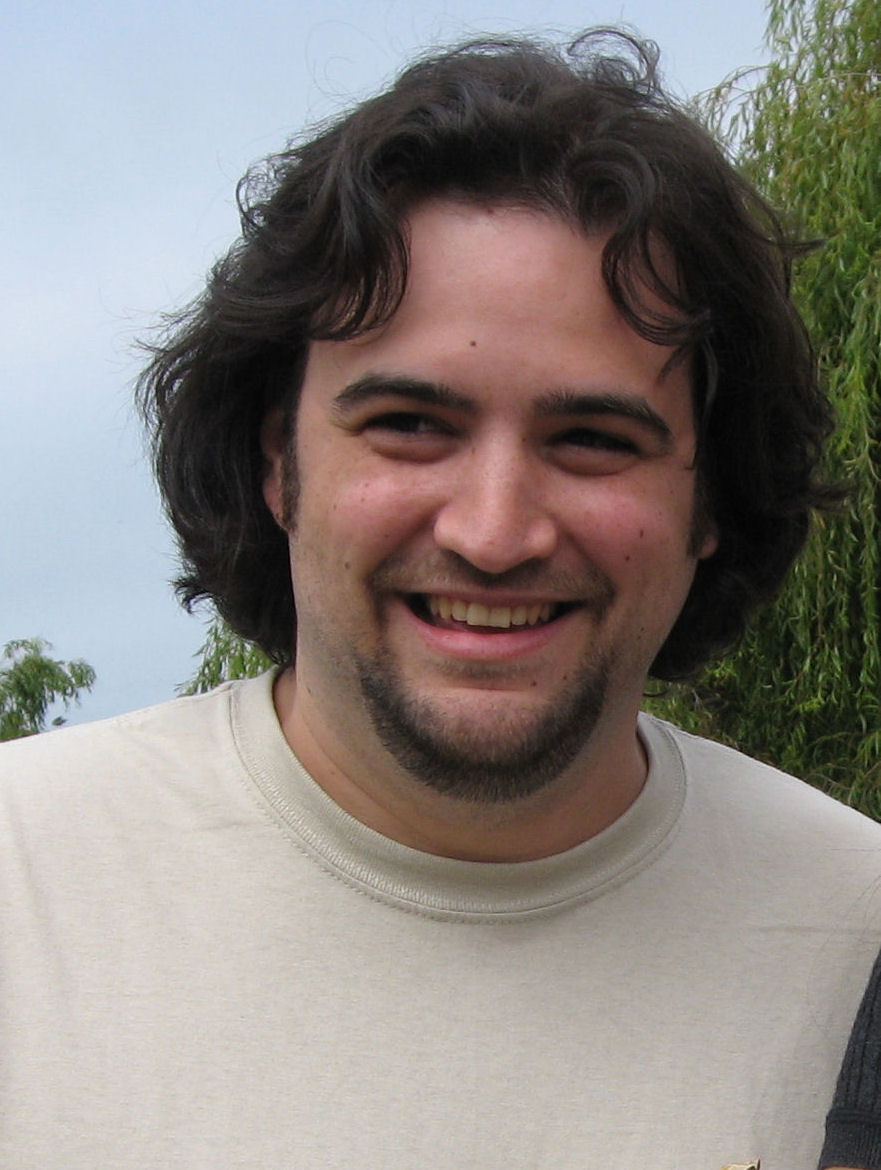
Voice actor Dominic Armato was enthusiastic to reprise the role of Guybrush Threepwood.

Michael Land, the composer behind preceding Monkey Island games, returned to score Tales of Monkey Island. In-house Telltale composer Jared Emerson-Johnson said that his own role in the game's music was "technical and administrative", and that, while he had been willing to assist Land, "the sound of the Monkey Island universe is all about Mike’s vision, so he was left alone to 'do his thing' as only he can". The soundtrack was recorded in MIDI format to reduce the data size for the Wii version; for the Windows version, the files were converted to WAV for increased quality. In each episode's production, music was among the last elements to be finalized, as it could not be finished until all cutscenes were properly timed.

Dominic Armato, the voice actor of Guybrush from The Curse of Monkey Island onward, reprises his role as that character. LucasArts encouraged Telltale to retain as much of the original cast as possible—particularly Armato, who was described by LucasArts' David Collins as "the ultimate Monkey Island fanboy". Armato enjoyed his opportunity to voice Guybrush again; he had believed that the series would never be continued, due to the length of time since Escape from Monkey Island's release. Armato voiced the character in both Tales of Monkey Island and the special edition of The Secret of Monkey Island; in the former game, he attempted to make Guybrush sound more mature and experienced than his younger incarnation in the latter. Because of Armato's understanding of the character, the voice directors gave him considerable flexibility in his performance.

Elaine Marley's voice actress in The Curse of Monkey Island, Alexandra Boyd, was also brought back for her role. Boyd was unable to travel to Telltale's studio in California; instead, she recorded her lines in London, while communicating with the voice director via Skype. Earl Boen—the original voice actor for LeChuck—had retired from acting, and was not initially available to reprise his role. The character was instead voiced by Adam Harrington in the first episode, and replaced by Kevin Blackton as the human LeChuck in chapters two to four. Boen returned to voice the demon LeChuck at the end of the fourth episode, and stayed on for the game's fifth and final chapter. Telltale later had Boen re-record the lines for LeChuck's demon incarnation in the first episode for the DVD release. To make the actors' portrayals more forceful, Telltale implemented a lip sync system capable of presenting a large range of facial expressions on character models.

=== Marketing ===
To promote Tales of Monkey Island, Telltale Games posted a series of fan-made Flash short films on their website. Entitled I Wonder What Happens in Tales of Monkey Island, the series was created by German animator Marius Fietzek, who co-wrote it with Andrei Constantinescu. The series' artwork was produced by Martin Koehler. Presented as a cartoon version of Tales of Monkey Island, the shorts speculated on the game's story and content, and depicted hypothetical events for the upcoming chapters. The first episode debuted on July 5, 2009, two days before the release of "Launch of the Screaming Narwhal". The second and third episodes followed on August 6 and September 16, respectively; the penultimate episode was released on October 22. For the final installment, released on December 4, Fietzek recruited Smudo of the German hip hop band Die Fantastischen Vier to do a musical number. Emerson-Johnson described the series as "absolutely fantastic", and said that "it really seems like these games appeal to people in a way that spurs huge amounts of excellent creative energy". He noted that Telltale "was passing [the videos] around for a good week" after they were posted.

A week after the release of the first episode, Telltale held a contest called "Game Designer for a Day", which gave fans the opportunity to submit and vote for a line of dialog to be used as an accusation against Guybrush. The winning line, "He dug up my perfectly good X!", was submitted by Liz Johnston of Okanagan, British Columbia, Canada, and was subsequently added to the trial scene in the fourth chapter while Johnston's name was included in the chapter's credits.

Telltale produced Tales of Monkey Island merchandise, which they sold from their online store. These included a poster print of Steve Purcell's cover artwork for the game, and a set of promotional badges; the latter had previously been available at conventions, such as E3. Further merchandise—including a tankard, a set of tarot cards, and a deluxe edition DVD—was made available in early March 2010. For the September 2009 International Talk Like a Pirate Day, Telltale Games made the game's first episode available for free on their website. Customers who had already purchased all five episodes were instead eligible for a free episode from one of Telltale's other series.

== Reception ==
=== Sales ===
Tales of Monkey Island was a commercial success, and it exceeded Telltale's sales projections. While no figures for the game have been released, the game was the company's most successful project, until it was outstripped by Back to the Future: The Game, which was released a year and a half later. Telltale CEO Dan Conners noted that the game had been the top selling product on Steam for "a few days". According to Telltale's marketing department, the game was predominately purchased as a full season, rather than as individual episodes. This was attributed to the strong narrative between episodes, in contrast to Telltale's previous work.

=== Critical ===
Aggregate review scores
Game	Metacritic
Launch of the Screaming Narwhal	PC: 79% Wii: 79%
The Siege of Spinner Cay	PC: 77% Wii: 79%
Lair of the Leviathan	PC: 82% Wii: 80%
The Trial and Execution of Guybrush Threepwood	PC: 80% Wii: 84%
Rise of the Pirate God	PC: 81% Wii: 83%

Critics believed that the first chapter, "Launch of the Screaming Narwhal", was a respectable start to the game. Ryan Scott of GameSpy wrote that the puzzles "generally challenge [the player] just enough without becoming too frustrating", while Eurogamer's Kristan Reed stated that their quality was "bang-on time after time". In contrast, criticism was directed toward certain puzzles' designs—particularly toward that of one maze puzzle. The writing and story were lauded, with several reviews commending the dialogue's humor. Adventure Gamers staff writer Evan Dickens felt that writing did not match up to the quality of LeChuck's Revenge. Although the chapter's supporting cast was considered weak, critics enjoyed the introduction of de Singe to the series. The voicework for the main characters was praised, as was Land's soundtrack. Critics were mostly complimentary toward the episode's graphics, with New Straits Times' Bruno Chan and The Sunday Times' David Phelan praising the updated interpretation of The Curse of Monkey Island's art style while 1UP.com's Bob Mackey called Guybrush "the most convincingly expressive Telltale character yet"; however, concerns were voiced over erratic graphical quality between characters. The game's controls were subject to reproof by a number of reviews; several preferred the keyboard controls over Telltale's new "click and drag" system.

Response to "The Siege of Spinner Cay" was similar to that of the preceding episode. Critics were divided over the quality of the chapter's puzzles: Destructoid reviewer Brad Nicholson criticized their design as "tight and constricted", and Dickens felt that they varied wildly in quality. In contrast, they were praised as "pleasantly non-linear" by Reed, and called logical and sensible by PALGN's Adam Ghiggino. The need for extended travel between locations, in order to complete mundane tasks, was criticized. The episode's writing was lauded by reviewers; particular praise was bestowed on the chapter's opening scene, which introduces Morgan LeFlay. Nevertheless, the story was disparaged by Reuben Lees of the Herald Sun for feeling "more like a bridge to open up further plotlines in the later episodes", a point echoed by other reviewers. While the supporting cast was again criticized, reviewers enjoyed the development of the main characters' roles. Critics admired the chapter's audio work, with Dickens calling Kevin Blackton's rendition of the human LeChuck a "real standout". Graphical tweaks over "The Launch of the Screaming Narwhal" were also appreciated.

Critics considered "Lair of the Leviathan" to be stronger than the previous chapters; on the review aggregator sites GameRankings and Metacritic, its Windows version holds the highest rating out of all Tales of Monkey Island episodes. The episode's puzzles were commended; IGN' Steve Butts opined that Telltale's puzzle design had "moved forward quite a bit", compared to both preceding chapters and their earlier Sam & Max games. One puzzle in particular, involving pirates holding a face-pulling contest, was praised by reviewers. Dickens described the chapter's story as "strong [and] advancing", and Ghiggino felt that it "continued the fine Monkey Island tradition of being bizarre, hilarious and pretty interesting". Several reviews drew comparisons to the 1883 book The Adventures of Pinocchio, due to the game's setting inside a giant manatee. The episode's writing received near unanimous praise, and response to the supporting cast was much improved over the preceding episodes; praise centered particularly around Murray, a demonic, disembodied skull. Criticism of "Lair of the Leviathan" primarily focused on the chapter's brevity and lack of varied locations.

Reviewers were more ambivalent toward the fourth episode, "The Trial and Execution of Guybrush Threepwood". Reception of its puzzles was mixed; Ghiggino described many as "frustrating for the wrong reasons", and Dickens, while praising several as "challenging and creative", believed that there were "definite misfires". Butts criticized the "arbitrary design" of several puzzles, but noted that they were "exactly what we've come to expect from the series". Nevertheless, the episode's titular trial sequence was lauded. Reaction to the chapter's plot was mostly positive, with Eduardo Reboucas of Game Revolution commenting that it "moves along at a steady pace, and ends with a dramatic bang". Several reviews praised the twists in the story, although Adventure Classic Gaming's Mark Newheiser opined that the darker turn late in the episode was detrimental to the otherwise light-hearted series. The episode's writing was praised, as was the use of returning Monkey Island character Stan as the trial's prosecutor. Critics were divided over the effectiveness of reusing the setting of "Launch of the Screaming Narwhal".

The final episode, "Rise of the Pirate God", was thought by critics to be a fitting end to the series. Response to the chapter's puzzles was mostly positive, though several reviewers maintained reservations about the difficulty and innovation of many of them. The level design, which requires players to backtrack between locations, was not well received. The chapter's climactic battle was thought to be sufficient, though timing issues caused GameCritics' Tera Kirk to describe it as "almost as frustrating as it is clever". Nevertheless, the story received strong praise, particularly for the role reversal between Guybrush and LeChuck; Destructoid's Anthony Burch noted that the chapter "completely and intentionally inverts [Monkey Island's] own cliches". Similarly, the writing and dialogue were commended, as was the voice acting, with critics praising Earl Boen's reprisal of the demon LeChuck and Armato's work as Guybrush. Reviewers complimented the graphics for both the ghostly "Crossroads" and the fire-ravaged real world; Butts expressed that "the levels all benefit from great color choices and fantastic lighting effects that really support the mood".

=== Accolades ===
Tales of Monkey Island received awards and award nominations from video game industry publications. Following the game's announcement at E3 2009, IGN named it the "Biggest Surprise" for the PC at the convention, and it was a finalist for GameSpot's Best Adventure Game of E3 award. IGN later nominated the first and third chapters as the best Wii and PC adventure games of the year, respectively. Gamasutra gave the game an honorable mention on its list of the year's best PC games; on their list of the top developers of the year, the site also presented Telltale Games with an honorable mention. Nintendo Power nominated Tales of Monkey Island for their awards for overall game of the year, best WiiWare game and best adventure game; the publication gave Morgan LeFlay the award for the year's best character. In its list of the best and worst video games of 2009, OC Weekly named Tales of Monkey Island the "Best Series Revival" of the year. About.com considered the game to be the second best Wii game of the year, and PC Gamer US awarded it "Adventure Game of the Year".

== See also ==
- A Vampyre Story – adventure game similarly by former LucasArts members
- Runaway: A Twist of Fate – Monkey Island-inspired adventure game from the same year
