= Dominic Armato =

American voice actor

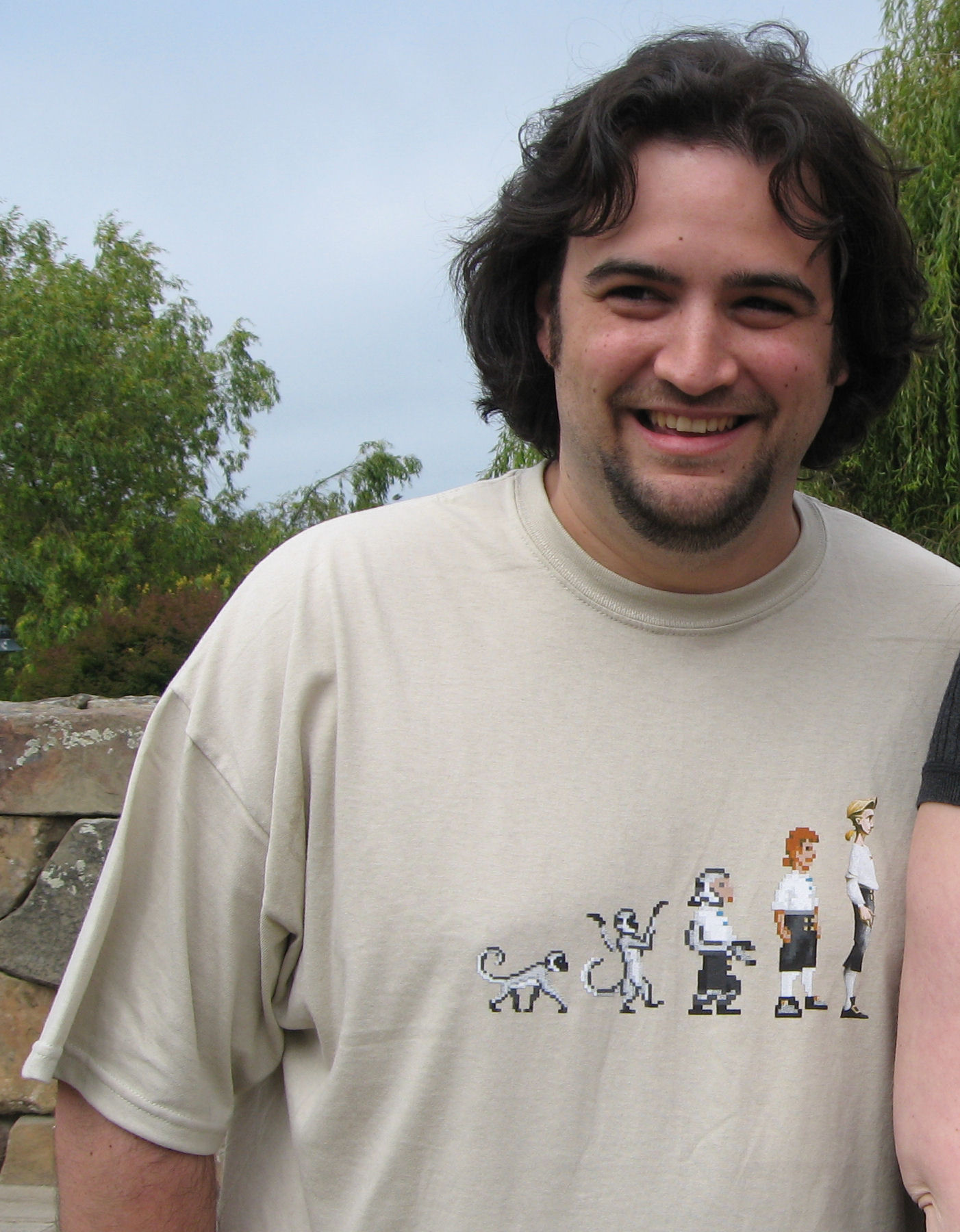
- Armato in 2009
- Born: November 18, 1976 (age 48); Melrose Park, Illinois, U.S.
- Occupation(s): Voice actor, journalist and food critic
- Years active: 1990–present

Dominic Armato (born November 18, 1976) is an American voice actor, journalist and food critic. He is best known for his work on LucasArts games. His most famous role is the voice of the pirate Guybrush Threepwood in the Monkey Island series.

== Career ==
Armato was a fan of the 1990s adventure games by LucasArts, such as the first two Monkey Island games. He joked with a friend that his ideal role would be to voice the Monkey Island protagonist, the pirate Guybrush Threepwood. Two months later, he was cast as Guybrush for The Curse of Monkey Island (1997). He has reprised the role for each of the sequels, plus the special editions of the first two games, and has also voiced characters in six Star Wars games and two Metal Gear games.

After ending his active voice-acting career in the early 2000s (with brief appearances in games), Armato has worked in the dining industry. Until 2015, Armato wrote a food-oriented blog, Skillet Doux. He was employed by The Arizona Republic as a food critic and journalist from 2015–2020.

== Filmography ==
=== Television ===
Year	Title	Role	Notes
1996	Aaahh!!! Real Monsters	Mike; Additional Voices	3 episodes
1997–1998	Burn-Up Excess	Additional Voices	English version
1999	Godzilla: The Series	Additional Voices	Episode: "An Early Frost"
1999–2003	Rocket Power	Sputz Ringley	
2003	Geneshaft	Hiroto Amagiwa; Young Hiroto	

=== Video games ===
Year	Title	Role	Notes
1997	The Curse of Monkey Island	Guybrush Threepwood	
1999	Star Wars Episode I: The Phantom Menace	Coruscant Male #2; Naboo Soldier #3; Naboo Soldier #6; Ticket Vendor; Alien Citizen	
1999	Star Wars: X-Wing Alliance	Imperial TIE Interceptor Pilot; Rebel Pilot	
2000	Star Wars: Force Commander	Repair Droid #47-B; Stormtrooper 2	
2000	Star Wars Episode I: Racer	Ben Quadinaros; Clegg Holdfast	
2000	Escape from Monkey Island	Guybrush Threepwood; Duck; Monkey 4	
2001	Metal Gear Solid 2: Sons of Liberty	Navy SEAL	English version
2002	Star Wars Racer Revenge	Ben Quadinaros; Clegg Holdfast	
2002	Star Wars Jedi Knight II: Jedi Outcast	Jedi 1 Prisoner 1 Protocol Droid (C-3PO)	
2002	Metal Gear Solid 2: Substance	Navy SEAL	
2009	The Secret of Monkey Island: Special Edition	Guybrush Threepwood	Remake of 1990 game
2009	Tales of Monkey Island	Guybrush Threepwood; Pyrite Parrot	
2010	Monkey Island 2: LeChuck's Revenge: Special Edition	Guybrush Threepwood	Remake of 1991 game
2022	Return to Monkey Island	Guybrush Threepwood	
2022	Lucy Dreaming	Woody	From UK studio Tall Story Games
2023	Sea of Thieves	Guybrush Threepwood	
