= Ollo in the Sunny Valley Fair =

2002 video game

- Developer: Hulabee Entertainment
- Publisher: Plaid Banana Entertainment
- Producer: Aimee Paganini
- Designers: Shannon Romano; Mike Paganini
- Writer: Dave Grossman
- Composer: Ben Hochberg
- Platforms: Windows, Macintosh, Linux
- Genres: Adventure, Edutainment

Ollo in the Sunny Valley Fair is a 2002 point-and-click adventure game produced by Hulabee Entertainment and published by Plaid Banana Entertainment.

== Plot ==
Ollo is helping Rose, a friend of his, grow a tomato for the annual fair. The tomato becomes gigantic and belts down to the Valley destroying everything in its path. Ollo has to help everyone put everything back together and capture the tomato.

== Gameplay ==
The game allows the player to pick up items, go to different locations, listen to characters, and find trivial click points. Clicking on an item allows the player to drag it over the screen. Clicking on a certain place while holding an object allows Ollo to use it. Most puzzles require the player to make exchanges with characters and trade items.

== Development ==
Ollo in the Sunny Valley Fair was the second game published by Plaid Banana Entertainment and the third game developed by Hulabee Entertainment. It was written by Dave Grossman. Ben Hochberg was the music composer. Ollo in the Sunny Valley Fair was designed by Mike Paganini, who was also the art lead, and Shannon Romano, who was also the program lead. Aimee Paganini was the producer. Ron Gilbert was the creative director. The game was published by Plaid Banana Entertainment, a publishing label of Disney Interactive.

== Reception ==
The game has articles published on it in The Washington Times, The Chronicle, and the New York Daily News. It is mentioned in the book Experiences in Math For Young Children.
