= The Secret of Monkey Island =

1990 video game

- Steve Purcell's cover art with Guybrush Threepwood, Elaine Marley, and several auxiliary characters
- Developers: Lucasfilm Games; A.C.R.O.N.Y.M. Games (special edition)
- Publishers: NA: Lucasfilm Games; EU: U.S. Gold; The Software Toolworks (CD)
- Director: Ron Gilbert
- Producer: Greg Hammond
- Designers: Ron Gilbert; Dave Grossman; Tim Schafer
- Programmers: Aric Wilmunder; CD-ROM conversion Wallace Poulter; Brad P. Taylor
- Artists: Steve Purcell; Mark Ferrari; Mike Ebert; Martin Cameron
- Writers: Ron Gilbert; Dave Grossman; Tim Schafer
- Composers: Michael Land; Patrick Mundy
- Series: Monkey Island
- Engine: SCUMM
- Platforms: Amiga; Atari ST; FM Towns; Classic Mac OS; MS-DOS; Sega CD; iOS; Windows; OS X; PlayStation 3; Xbox 360
- Release: 16 color version October 1990; 256 color version December 1990; CD-ROM version 1992; Special edition July 15, 2009
- Genre: Graphic adventure
- Mode: Single-player

The Secret of Monkey Island is a 1990 point-and-click graphic adventure game developed and published by Lucasfilm Games. It takes place in a fictional version of the Caribbean during the age of piracy. The player assumes the role of Guybrush Threepwood, a young man who dreams of becoming a pirate, and explores fictional islands while solving puzzles.

The game was conceived in 1988 by Lucasfilm employee Ron Gilbert, who designed it with Tim Schafer and Dave Grossman. Gilbert's frustrations with contemporary adventure titles led him to make the player character's death almost impossible, which meant that gameplay focused on exploration. The atmosphere was based on that of the Pirates of the Caribbean theme park ride. The Secret of Monkey Island was the fifth game built with the SCUMM engine, which was heavily modified to include a more user-friendly interface.

Critics praised The Secret of Monkey Island for its humor, audiovisuals, and gameplay. Several publications list it among the greatest video games of all time. The game spawned a number of sequels, collectively known as the Monkey Island series. Gilbert, Schafer and Grossman also led the development of the sequel Monkey Island 2: LeChuck's Revenge. LucasArts released a remake of the original in 2009, which was also well received by the gaming press.

== Gameplay ==
The Secret of Monkey Island is a 2D adventure game played from a third-person perspective. Via a point-and-click interface, the player guides protagonist Guybrush Threepwood through the game's world and interacts with the environment by selecting from twelve verb commands (nine in newer versions) such as "talk to" for communicating with characters and "pick up" for collecting items between commands and the world's objects in order to successfully solve puzzles and thus progress in the game. While conversing with other characters, the player may choose between topics for discussion that are listed in a dialog tree; the game is one of the first to incorporate such a system. The in-game action is frequently interrupted by cutscenes. Like other LucasArts adventure games, The Secret of Monkey Island features a design philosophy that makes the player character's death nearly impossible (Guybrush does drown if he stays underwater for more than ten minutes).

== Plot ==
A youth named Guybrush Threepwood arrives on Mêlée Island, hoping to become a pirate. He seeks out the island's pirate leaders, who set him three trials: winning a sword duel against Carla, the island's resident swordmaster; finding a buried treasure; and stealing a valuable idol from the governor's mansion. These quests take Guybrush throughout the island, where he hears of stories of the ghost pirate LeChuck, who apparently died in an expedition to the mysterious Monkey Island, an act that was meant to win the love of the governor, Elaine Marley. Guybrush meets several characters of interest, including a local voodoo priestess, Stan the Used Boat Salesman, Carla the Sword Master, a prisoner named Otis, and Meathook, whose hands have been replaced by hooks.

Guybrush encounters Elaine and is smitten, and she soon reciprocates. However, as he completes the tasks set for him, the island is raided by LeChuck and his undead crew, who abduct Elaine and retreat to their secret hideout on Monkey Island. Guybrush buys a ship and hires Carla, Otis, and Meathook as crew before setting sail. On Monkey Island, Guybrush discovers a village of cannibals in a dispute with Herman Toothrot, a castaway marooned there. He settles their quarrel, then recovers a magical "voodoo root" from LeChuck's ship for the cannibals, who provide him with a seltzer bottle of "voodoo root elixir" that can destroy ghosts.

When Guybrush returns to LeChuck's ship with the elixir, he learns that LeChuck has returned to Mêlée Island to marry Elaine at the church. He promptly returns to Mêlée Island and gatecrashes the wedding, only to ruin Elaine's own plan for escape; in the process he loses the elixir. Now confronted with a furious LeChuck, Guybrush is savagely beaten by the ghost pirate in a fight ranging across the island. At the ship emporium, Guybrush finds a bottle of root beer. Substituting it for the lost elixir, he sprays LeChuck, destroying him. Guybrush and Elaine enjoy a romantic moment, watching fireworks caused by LeChuck exploding.

== Development ==
=== Origin and writing ===
Ron Gilbert conceived the idea of a pirate adventure game in 1988, after completing Zak McKracken and the Alien Mindbenders. He first wrote story ideas about pirates while spending the weekend at a friend's house. Gilbert experimented with introductory paragraphs to find a satisfactory idea. His initial story featured unnamed villains that would eventually become LeChuck and Elaine; Guybrush was absent at this point. He pitched it to Lucasfilm Games's staff as a series of short stories. Gilbert's idea was warmly received, but production was postponed because Lucasfilm Games assigned its designers, including Gilbert, to Indiana Jones and the Last Crusade: The Graphic Adventure. Development of The Last Crusade was finished in 1989, which allowed Gilbert to begin production of The Secret of Monkey Island, then known internally under the working title Mutiny on Monkey Island.

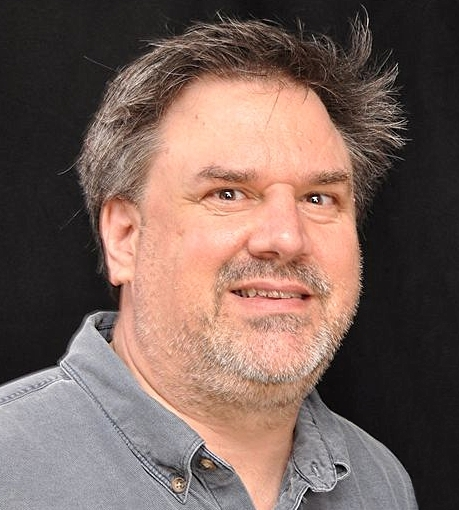
Ron Gilbert led the game's development and conceived its plot (2011 photo).

Gilbert soon realised that it would be difficult to design the game by himself; he decided to join forces with Tim Schafer and Dave Grossman, both of whom he hired for Lucasfilm. The game's insult sword fighting mechanics were influenced by swashbuckling movies starring Errol Flynn, which Gilbert, Schafer and Grossman often watched for inspiration. They noticed that pirates in those films often taunted their opponents instead of attacking them, which gave the designers the idea to base the game's duels on insults rather than combat. Writer Orson Scott Card helped them write the insults during a visit to Lucasfilm's headquarters at Skywalker Ranch. Many of Gilbert's original gameplay ideas were abandoned during the production process, although he stated that "most of that stuff was left out for a reason".

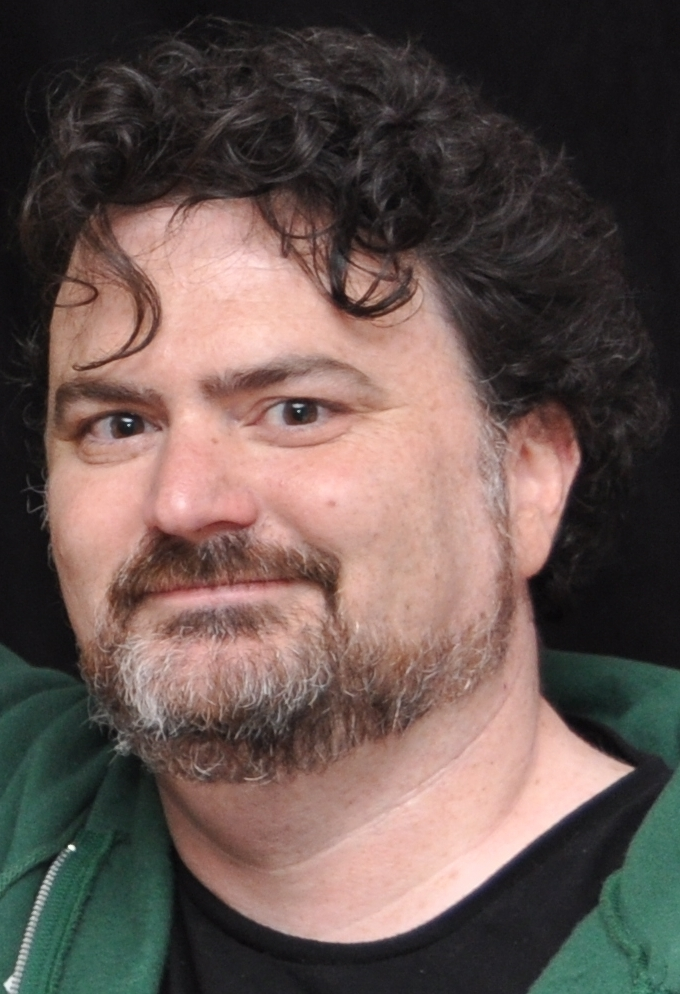
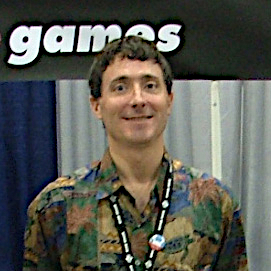
Tim Schafer (left, 2011 photo) and Dave Grossman (right, 2007 photo) co-wrote the game's plot with Gilbert and supplied programming.

The game's plot, as described by Dave Grossman: "It's a story about this young man who comes to an island in search of his life's dream. He's pursuing his career goals and he discovers love in the process and winds up thinking that was actually more important than what he was doing to begin with. You're laughing, but there's actually something deeper going on as well". When work on the plot began, Gilbert discovered that Schafer's and Grossman's writing styles were too different to form a cohesive whole: Grossman's was "very kind of a dry, sarcastic humor" and Schafer's was "just a little more in your face". In reaction, Gilbert assigned them to different characters and story moments depending on what type of comedy was required. Grossman believed that this benefited the game's writing, as he and Schafer "were all funny in slightly different ways, and it worked well together". Schafer and Grossman wrote most of the dialogue while they were programming the game; as a result, much of it was improvised. Some of the dialogue was based on the designers' personal experiences, such as Guybrush's line "I had a feeling in hell there would be mushrooms", which came from Schafer's own hatred of fungi.

The game's world and characters were designed primarily by Gilbert. After having read Tim Powers' historical fantasy novel On Stranger Tides, he decided to add paranormal themes to the game's plot. He also cited Powers' book as an influence on the characters, particularly those of Guybrush and LeChuck. Inspiration for the game's ambiance came from Gilbert's favorite childhood amusement park ride, Pirates of the Caribbean. Grossman said that Gilbert always wanted "to step off the ride" and "talk to the people who lived in that world". Near the final stages of the design work, Gilbert introduced several characters who were not directly related to the game's story. He considered this to be an important decision, as the player would need those seemingly minor characters in later parts of the game and would receive a chance to "really interact with them".

=== Creative and technical design ===
The developers included a character from Loom (another 1990 Lucasfilm Games title). When approached for conversation, the character encourages the player to purchase Loom.

Gilbert, Schafer and Grossman's primary goal was to create a simpler and more accessible gameplay model than those presented in previous Lucasfilm titles. Gilbert had conceived the main designs and puzzles before production began, which resulted in the bulk of the designers' work to flesh out his ideas. He was frustrated by the adventure games that Sierra On-Line was releasing at the time, and later said that "you died any time you did anything wrong". Gilbert considered such gameplay as "a cheap way out for the designer". He had previously applied his design ideas to the 1987 graphic adventure title Maniac Mansion, but considered he committed a number of mistakes during development, such as dead-end situations that prevented the player from completing the game and poorly implemented triggers for cutscenes. Gilbert aimed to avoid such errors in The Secret of Monkey Island. The team decided to make it impossible for the player character to die, with one notable exception, which focused gameplay primarily on world exploration. The Sierra game-over screen was parodied, when Guybrush falls off a cliff only to be bounced back up by a "rubber tree". Guybrush can also be killed by drowning, though it is an Easter egg unlikely to be found without conscientious effort.

A scene in The Secret of Monkey Island shows the protagonist Guybrush Threepwood standing on the docks of Mêlée Island. Below the scene, the game displays the list of the verb commands and items in the player's inventory in a point-and-click menu.

The same scene in the special edition. The verb portion of the screen has been removed as part of a control overhaul, while the background artwork has been made more elaborate to build a much more vibrant environment.

The Secret of Monkey Island was the fifth Lucasfilm Games project powered by the SCUMM engine, originally developed for Maniac Mansion. The company had gradually modified the engine since its creation. For Maniac Mansion, the developers hard coded verb commands in the SCUMM scripting language. These commands become more abstract in subsequent versions of the engine. The developers carried over the practice of referring to individual segments of the gameworld as "rooms", even though the areas in Monkey Island were outdoors. The game uses the same version of the engine used in Indiana Jones and the Last Crusade: The Graphic Adventure, with minor changes. A dialogue tree was added, which facilitated conversation options and the sword-fighting puzzles. The developers removed the "What is" option (an input command that describes an on-screen object to the player) in favor of allowing the player to simply highlight the object with the mouse cursor. The game's improved interface became the standard for the company's later titles. The game also introduced logical verb shortcuts, which could be performed with the mouse; for example, clicking on a character defaults to the "talk" action, the most obvious action in the situation. SCUMM's visuals were updated for the game—the original EGA version had a 320x200 pixel resolution rendered in 16 colors. According to artist Steve Purcell, that became a major limitation for the art team; due to a low number of "ghastly" colors, they often chose bizarre tones for backgrounds. They chose black and white for Guybrush's outfit for the same reason. The VGA version of the game later corrected these issues by implementing 256-color support, which allowed for more advanced background and character art. Other platform releases removed the infamous "stump joke" from the game, which was a joke in the EGA version in which the player would examine a tree stump in the forest. Guybrush would exclaim that there is an opening to a system of catacombs and attempt to enter, but this would result in a message stating the player needed to insert disc 22, then 36, then 114 in order to continue. The joke resulted in numerous calls to the LucasArts hotline asking about missing discs. As a result, the joke was removed from later editions and is mentioned as a conversation option for the LucasArts Hint Hotline in the sequel.

The game's "pirate reggae" music was composed by Lucasfilm Games' in-house musician Michael Land in MIDI format. It was his first project at the company. The game was originally released for floppy disk in 1990, but a CD-ROM version with a high-quality CD soundtrack followed in 1992. The music has remained popular, and has been remixed by the musicians of OverClocked ReMix and by the game's fans.

The Secret of Monkey Island ultimately cost $200,000 to produce, and was developed over nine months.

=== Special edition ===
LucasArts released a remake in July 2009 as The Secret of Monkey Island: Special Edition for iPhone, Windows, and Xbox 360 via digital distribution. LucasArts confirmed the game's development one month earlier on June 1; rumors appeared several days earlier when the Xbox 360 version of the game received an USK rating. It was developed by A.C.R.O.N.Y.M. Games and first displayed to the public at the E3 expo in June. The remake has hand-drawn visuals with more detail, a remastered musical score, voice for characters, and a hint system. The game can also be switched between new and original audiovisuals at will. The voice actors include Dominic Armato as Guybrush Threepwood and Earl Boen as LeChuck.

LucasArts producer Craig Derrick and his team conceived the idea of the remake in 2008. After researching the Monkey Island series' history, they decided to make "something fresh and new while staying true to the original". The developers tried to leave much of the original design unchanged. Any changes were intended to achieve the level of immersion desired for the original. To that end, they added details like a pirate ship or pirates talking in the background of scenes. While the team considered the SCUMM interface revolutionary at the time, LucasArts community manager Brooks Brown noted that it is incompatible with an analog stick, which most consoles use. The designers made the cursor contextual to the game objects as the primary interface. Brown had considered updating the reference to advertise Star Wars: The Force Unleashed because Loom was not on the market at the time, but concluded that the game would not be the same if such changes were implemented. Prior to the Special Edition release, however, LucasArts announced that Loom, along with other games from its back catalog, would be made available on Steam. Brown stated that the decision to distribute the game online was because "digital downloads have finally gotten going".

The Special Editions of The Secret of Monkey Island and its sequel were later released physically for Xbox 360, PlayStation 3, and Windows (exclusively in Europe) as Monkey Island Special Edition Collection.

== Reception ==
Reception

Aggregate score
Aggregator	Score
GameRankings	PC: 81%

Review scores
Publication	Score
Computer and Video Games	94%
Dragon	5/5
Amiga Power	90%
Amiga Action	90%
The One	92%
Amiga Computing	90%
Zero	84
ACE	922 (Amiga); 918 (Atari ST); 915 (IBM PC)
Mega	91%

The Secret of Monkey Island received positive reviews from critics. According to Gilbert, it "sold well" but was "never a big hit". Grossman later summarized that the game's sales were "north of 100,000, far south of 1 million. Back in those days, a few hundred thousand was a giant smash hit". According to Next Generation, The Secret of Monkey Island was a "relatively minor hit" in the United States, but the game and its sequel became "blockbusters on the PC and the Amiga throughout Europe".

Hartley, Patricia, and Kirk Lesser of Dragon praised the designers' attention to detail, and cited the game's humor as a high point. Although they believed that the game was too expensive, they summarized it as "a highly enjoyable graphic adventure replete with interesting puzzles, a fantastic Roland soundtrack, superb VGA graphics, smooth-scrolling animation, and some of the funniest lines ever seen on your computer screen". Duncan MacDonald of Zero praised the graphics and found the game "quite amusing". His favorite aspect was the fine-tuned difficulty level, which he believed was "just right", ending his review with "at last an adventure game that's enjoyable rather than frustrating". Paul Glancey of Computer and Video Games consider the game superior to Lucasfilm's earlier adventure titles, and wrote that "usually the entertainment you get from an adventure is derived solely from solving puzzles, but the hilarious characters and situations, and the movie-like presentation ... make playing this more like taking part in a comedy film, so it's much more enjoyable". He considered the puzzles to be "brilliantly conceived" and found the game's controls accessible. He summarized it as "utterly enthralling".

ACE's Steve Cooke also found the controls convenient, and he praised the game's atmosphere. He wrote that, "in graphics and sound terms ... Monkey Island, along with King's Quest V, is currently at the head of the pack". However, he disliked the designers' running joke of placing "TM" after character and place names, which he thought detracted from the atmosphere. He singled out the game's writing, characters and plot structure as its best elements. Amiga Power's Mark Ramshaw wrote "with The Secret of Monkey Island, the mouse-controlled, graphic-adventure comes of age". He lauded its comedic elements, which he believed were the highlight of the game. The reviewer also praised the control scheme, noting that it allows the player to "more or less forget about the specifics of what [they are] physically doing ... and lose [themselves] in the adventure instead". He noted that the game's plot and visual and aural presentation fit together to create a thick atmosphere, and finished: "Forget all those other milestone adventures (Zork, The Hobbit, Lord of the Rings et al) — for sheer enjoyment and general all-round perfection, The Secret of Monkey Island creams 'em all in style". The game, along with its sequel, was ranked the 19th best game of all time by Amiga Power.

Writing for The One, Paul Presley stated that "Lucasfilm appears to have taken all of the elements that worked in its previous releases and, not only incorporated them into this tale of scurvy swashbuckling, but even improved on them in the process!" Like the other reviewers, he praised its controls. He also lauded its "hilarious storyline, strong characters and ... intriguing setting", but complained about graphical slowdowns. Nick Clarkson of Amiga Computing cited the game's graphics as "flawless", noting that "the characters are superbly animated and the backdrops simply ooze atmosphere". He highly praised its sound effects and music, and believed that its controls "couldn't be simpler". The staff of Amiga Action wrote that the "attention to detail and the finely tuned gameplay cannot be faulted". They called the graphics "stunning throughout", and believed that, when they were combined with the "excellent Caribbean tunes", the result is a game filled with character and atmosphere. They ended by stating that "there is absolutely no excuse for not owning this game". Computer Gaming World said that "Monkey Island offers up LucasArt's famous humor at its best ... For an adventure you'll long remember, raise your cup of grog".

The Secret of Monkey Island has featured regularly in lists of "top" games, such as Computer Gaming World's Hall of Fame and IGN's Video Game Hall of Fame. In 1991, PC Format placed The Secret of Monkey Island on its list of the 50 best computer games of all time, calling it "genuinely funny". In 1996, Computer Gaming World ranked it as the 19th best game of all time, writing: "Who could ever forget the insult-driven duel system or the identity of the mysterious Swordmaster?". In 2004, readers of Retro Gamer voted it as the 33rd top retro game. IGN named The Secret of Monkey Island one of the ten best LucasArts adventure games in 2009, and ranked the Xbox Live Arcade version as the 20th best title of all time for that platform in 2010. In 2017, The Secret of Monkey Island ranked 78th in the "Scientifically Proven Best Video Games of All Time", a statistical meta-analysis compiled by Warp Zoned of 44 "top games" lists published between 1995 and 2016.

=== Special edition ===
Reception

Aggregate scores
Aggregator	Score
GameRankings	iOS: 87%
Metacritic	PC: 86/100; X360: 88/100; PS3: 87/100

Review scores
Publication	Score
Eurogamer	9 out of 10
GamePro	4 out of 5
GameSpot	8 out of 10
IGN	8.7 out of 10

Like the original release, The Secret of Monkey Island: Special Edition received positive reviews from critics. Sean Ely of GamePro praised its updated audio, and said that the new graphics "blow the old clunker visuals ... out of the water". He cited its script, humor, plot, puzzles and balanced difficulty level as high points, and finished, "The Secret of Monkey Island: Special Edition is impressive, hilarious and downright worth your money". Daemon Hatfield of IGN wrote: "Almost 20 years after its release, [The Secret of Monkey Island] remains a blast to play". He called the new graphics "slick, if a little generic", and noted that the "original graphics have a certain charm to them that the fancy pants new visuals just don't", but he enjoyed the redone music, the new hint function, and the added sound effects and voice acting. He summarized it as "one of the best times you'll ever have pointing and clicking", and noted that "few games are this funny". Justin Calvert of GameSpot noted that "the Special Edition looks much better and is the only way to play if you want to hear ... what characters are saying, whereas the original game's interface is less clunky". However, he wrote that "the voice work is such a great addition to the game that it's difficult to go back to the original edition". He praised its humor, writing, puzzles and characters, and he believed that it had aged well. Eurogamer's Dan Whitehead wrote: "Purists like me will almost certainly find something to grumble about over the span of the game, but the overall impact of the redesign is undeniably for the better". He preferred the original game's Guybrush design, and believed that the new control system was "rather less intuitive" than the old one. He finished by stating that "few games can stand the test of time with such confidence".

== Legacy ==
The Secret of Monkey Island spawned five sequels. The first, Monkey Island 2: LeChuck's Revenge, was released in 1991 and focuses on LeChuck's return. Six years later, LucasArts released The Curse of Monkey Island, which features a new visual design. In 2000, the company released Escape from Monkey Island, which uses the GrimE engine of Grim Fandango to produce 3D graphics. The next title, Tales of Monkey Island released in 2009, is a series of five episodic chapters. The most recent title, Return to Monkey Island, was released in 2022 and revisits several locations and characters from the first game.

Elements of the game have appeared elsewhere in popular culture. The original version was selected as one of five for the exhibition The Art of Video Games in the Smithsonian American Art Museum in 2011. A fictive drink recipe in the game for grog was mistakenly reported as real in 2009 by Argentine news channel C5N, which urged teenagers against consuming the dangerous "Grog XD" drink. In Tales of Monkey Island, Guybrush refers to this news story while pushing the Grog XD button on a Grog machine.

In a celebration of the game's 30th anniversary, Ron Gilbert shared secrets from its original source code during a video conversation with the Video Games History Foundation. These included early character prototypes, unused animations and alternative game environments.

On July 20, 2023, game studio Rare LTD released an update for their game Sea of Thieves where players could visit Mêlée Island and interact with characters of the Monkey Island game series in a new adventure bridging the stories of both worlds.
