= Dave Grossman (game developer) =

American video game developer (fl. since 1989)

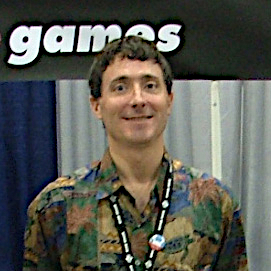
- Dave Grossman at the Comic-Con 2007
- Occupations: Video game designer, programmer, writer

Dave Grossman is an American video game designer, programmer and writer, known for his work at Telltale Games in the late 2000s and at LucasArts in the early 1990s.

He has also written several children's books, and a book of "guy poetry" called Ode to the Stuff in the Sink.

In 2009, he was chosen by IGN as one of the top 100 game creators of all time.

== Game industry career ==
Grossman joined Lucasfilm Games, later known as LucasArts in 1989. At LucasArts, Grossman wrote and programmed The Secret of Monkey Island and Monkey Island 2: LeChuck's Revenge together with Ron Gilbert and Tim Schafer. He later co-designed Day of the Tentacle.

Grossman quit LucasArts in 1994 to begin a freelance career. For Humongous Entertainment, a company co-founded by Ron Gilbert, he helped create many critically acclaimed games aimed at children, such as the Pajama Sam series. Later he also wrote children's games for Hulabee Entertainment and Disney.

He then designed adventure games at Telltale Games, a company founded by LucasArts veterans. He joined Telltale in 2005 as lead designer. In 2009, he returned to his Monkey Island roots, as Design Director on Telltale Games' episodic Tales of Monkey Island.

He left Telltale in August 2014 and joined Amazon Alexa gaming specialists, Reactive Studios, in November 2014 as Chief Creative Officer. Reactive Studios has since changed its name to EarPlay.

In 2020 he joined Ron Gilbert in developing Return to Monkey Island. The game was released in 2022.

== Children's books ==
Lyrick Publishing published three books written by Grossman that were based on characters from Humongous Entertainment's games. They were Freddi Fish: The Big Froople Match, Pajama Sam: Mission to the Moon, and Freddi Fish: The Missing Letters Mystery.

For Fisher-Price/Nickelodeon, Grossman authored two interactive books, SpongeBob SquarePants: Sleepy Time and Fairly OddParents: Squawkers.

== Other works ==
Grossman claimed that his interests in other works were often inspired by his father: "I guess I've inherited a certain restless tinkerer's curiosity from my father (who mainly works in words, wood, photography and architecture, often in combination)." These include his interests in writing, drawing, sculpture, and music.

Grossman is the author of "Ode to the Stuff in the Sink: A Book of Guy Poetry," which he self-published in 2002. It contains a selection of illustrated poems dedicated to different aspects of male life, including inability to dance, old stuff in the fridge, and unwillingness to clean anything. The book is available from Dave Grossman's personal website, Phrenopolis.com. Many of the poems were first published in his Poem of the Week electronic mailing list.

Grossman co-designed a successful robot toy for Fisher-Price.

== Game contributions ==
| Year | Title | Role | Developer |
|---|---|---|---|
| 1990 | The Secret of Monkey Island | Programmer, designer | Lucasfilm Games |
| 1991 | Monkey Island 2: LeChuck's Revenge | Programmer | LucasArts |
| 1993 | Day of the Tentacle | Director, producer, design, programmer | LucasArts |
| 1996 | Pajama Sam: No Need to Hide When It's Dark Outside | Writer | Humongous Entertainment |
| 1998 | Pajama Sam 2: Thunder and Lightning Aren't so Frightening | Writer | Humongous Entertainment |
| 1999 | Freddi Fish 4: The Case of the Hogfish Rustlers of Briny Gulch | Writer | Humongous Entertainment |
| 2000 | Pajama Sam 3: You Are What You Eat from Your Head to Your Feet | Writer | Humongous Entertainment |
| 2002 | Moop and Dreadly in the Treasure on Bing Bong Island | Writer | Hulabee Entertainment |
| 2002 | Ollo in the Sunny Valley Fair | Writer | Hulabee Entertainment |
| 2003 | Piglet's Big Game | Writer | Hulabee Entertainment |
| 2005 | Bone: Out from Boneville | Writer, designer | Telltale Games |
| 2006 – 2007 | Sam & Max Save the World | Writer, designer | Telltale Games |
| 2007 – 2008 | Sam & Max Beyond Time and Space | Writer, designer | Telltale Games |
| 2008 | Strong Bad's Cool Game for Attractive People | Director of design | Telltale Games |
| 2009 – 2010 | Tales of Monkey Island | Director of design | Telltale Games |
| 2010 – 2011 | Back to the Future: The Game | Director of design | Telltale Games |
| 2022 | Return to Monkey Island | Design, writer | Terrible Toybox |
| 2024 | Spectre Divide | Writer | Mountaintop Studios |

Grossman also made contributions to The Dig, Total Annihilation, and Insecticide, and was a script editor on Voodoo Vince. He also designed the trophies / Steam achievements for the remastered version of Day of the Tentacle.
