= Jen Taylor =

American actress

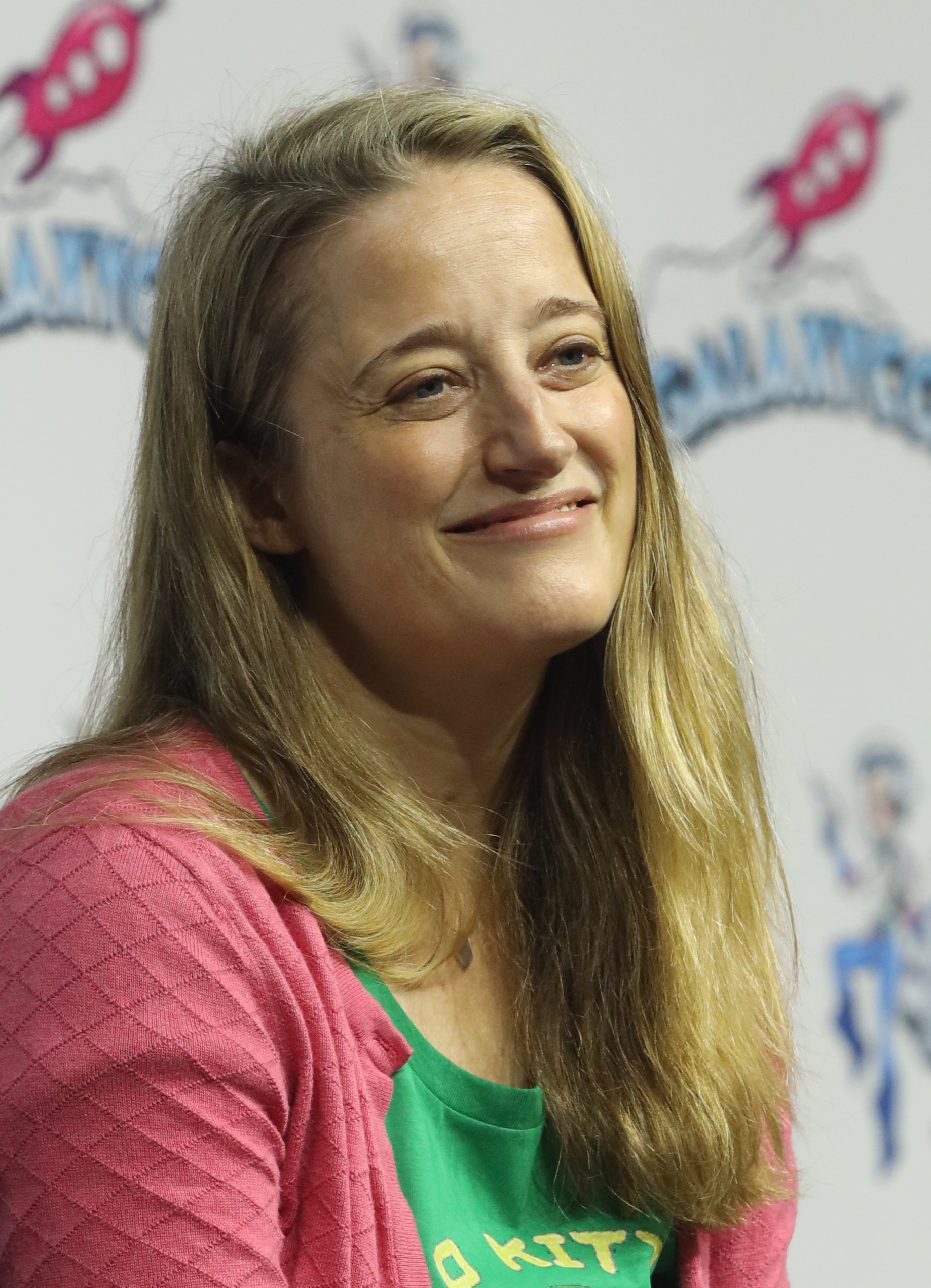
- Taylor at GalaxyCon Raleigh in 2022
- Born: Jennifer Lee Taylor; Seattle, Washington, U.S.
- Occupations: Actress, Voice Actress
- Years active: 1993–present

Jennifer Lee Taylor is an American actress. She is best known for her roles as Cortana in the Halo games and the Cortana personal assistant, the voice of Zoey in the Left 4 Dead franchise and formerly as Princess Peach, Toad and other characters in the Mario franchise from 1999 to 2008.

== Career ==
Jen Taylor taught herself how to do voice work by recording the radio and imitating what she heard. She graduated from Northwestern University with a degree in theater. Before starting in voice work, she worked as a radio DJ for KNDD.

Taylor has voiced characters in video games, including Princess Peach and Toad in Mario games between 1999 and 2008. She voiced the character Cortana in Halo games since the first game in the series, Halo: Combat Evolved (2001). Two decades following the original game, Taylor reprised the role of Cortana by voice acting and performance capture in the Paramount+ TV series. At GalaxyCon Columbus in December 2023, Taylor stated her favorite line as Cortana is "Welcome home, John" from Halo 4.

Taylor has played Salem in the web series RWBY, since 2013. She voiced an episode of the radio series The Classic Adventures of Sherlock Holmes

Taylor has narrated nearly 30 audiobooks, and has received several AudioFile Earphones Awards. Her narration of Tami Hoag's Mismatch was nominated for an Audie Award in 2009.

As a stage actress, Taylor has played Elizabeth Bennet in Pride and Prejudice and Eliza Doolittle in a Seattle Shakespeare Company production of Pygmalion.

== Filmography ==
=== Live-action ===
List of acting performances in television and film
Year	Title	Role	Notes	Source
2004	Inheritance	Abbey		
2018	Everything Sucks!	Miss Stock	2 episodes	
2022–2024	Halo	Cortana		

=== Animation ===
List of voice performances in animation
Year	Title	Role	Notes	Source
2013–present	RWBY	Mysterious Narrator / Salem		
2015	Halo: The Fall of Reach	Dr. Catherine Elizabeth Halsey		
2022	RWBY: Ice Queendom	Mysterious Narrator / Salem	English dub	

=== Video games ===
List of voice performances in video games
Year	Title	Role	Notes	Source
1997	Backyard Baseball	Sunny Day		
1998	Thinkin' Things: Sky Island Mysteries	Glove		
1998	Backyard Soccer	Sunny Day		
1999	Backyard Football	Sunny Day		
1999–2007	Mario franchise	Princess Peach, Toad, Toadette; Princess Daisy (2000–2003), Birdo (2001)		
2000	Backyard Baseball 2001	Sunny Day		
2000	Backyard Soccer MLS Edition	Sunny Day		
2001	Backyard Football 2002	Sunny Day		
2001	Aliens versus Predator 2	Tomiko / Johnson		
2001	Halo: Combat Evolved	Cortana / Life Pod Pilot		
2001	Super Smash Bros. Melee	Princess Peach		
2001	Backyard Basketball	Sunny Day		
2002	No One Lives Forever 2: A Spy in H.A.R.M.'s Way	Cate Archer / Isako / Ninja Girls		
2002	Kakuto Chojin: Back Alley Brutal	Roxy		
2004	Halo 2	Cortana		
2006	Sin Episodes: Emergence	Jessica Cannon		
2007	Halo 3	Cortana		
2008	Left 4 Dead	Zoey		
2009	F.E.A.R. 2: Project Origin	Lt. Keira Stokes		
2009	1 vs. 100 Live	Herself		
2010	Left 4 Dead 2	Zoey		
2010	Halo: Reach	Dr. Catherine Elizabeth Halsey, Cortana (Firefight)		
2012	Guild Wars 2	Demmi Beetlestone		
2012	Halo 4	Cortana, Dr. Catherine Elizabeth Halsey	Also motion-capture performance for Halsey	
2013	Dota 2	Lina, Puck, Windranger, Medusa		
2014	Destiny	City Civil Frame, Archive Security A.I., City P.A.		
2015	Infinite Crisis	Atomic Wonder Woman		
2015	Halo 5: Guardians	Cortana, Dr. Catherine Elizabeth Halsey	Also motion-capture performance for Dr. Halsey	
2018	Forza Horizon 4	Cortana		
2021	Halo Infinite	Cortana, Dr. Catherine Elizabeth Halsey, "The Weapon"		
2026	Halo: Campaign Evolved	Cortana, Lt. Taylor		

=== Other works ===
Year	Title	Role	Notes	Source
2014–2017	Windows Phone 8.1	Cortana		
2015–2023	Windows 10	Cortana		
2021–2023	Windows 11	Cortana		
