= Backyard Baseball 2005 =

2003 video game

Backyard Baseball
- Cover art of the original GameCube version featuring Alex Rodriguez, then of the Texas Rangers; the PlayStation 2 and Windows versions update his appearance to wear a New York Yankees uniform after his 2004 trade to that team
- Developer: Humongous Entertainment
- Publisher: Infogrames/Atari
- Series: Backyard Baseball; Backyard Sports
- Platforms: GameCube; PlayStation 2; Windows
- Release: April 2, 2003: GameCube; US: April 2, 2003; PlayStation 2; US: March 23, 2004; Windows (Backyard Baseball 2005); US: June 22, 2004
- Genre: Sports
- Modes: Single-player, multiplayer

Backyard Baseball is a 2003 baseball video game developed by Humongous Entertainment and published by Infogrames (later Atari). It was originally developed and released for the GameCube on April 2, 2003. Updated ports for PlayStation 2 and Windows were released in 2004 on March 23 and June 22, respectively, with the Windows version released as Backyard Baseball 2005. All versions are collectively the fourth main entry in the Backyard Baseball sub-series of the Backyard Sports franchise, with the GameCube game being the first Backyard Baseball game released for a home console and the first Backyard Baseball game to use a 3D graphics engine instead of the SCUMM engine.

== Gameplay ==
Backyard Baseball 2005 is an arcade baseball game featuring a group of 30 children players known as the "Backyard Kids" and 16 real-life Major League Baseball players (ten in the original GameCube release) as kids. As with past Backyard Baseball games, players can play a single game or a season mode, the latter which sees players guides a team though a "Backyard Baseball League" season in hopes of winning enough games to reach the playoffs and ultimately win the "Backyard World Series" like with past MLB-licensed games in the series. A spectator mode is also available like with past games. Additionally, the batting practice mode of previous games is replaced with a Home Run Derby mode, in which up to eight kids compete in hitting home runs from robot pitcher Mr. Clanky. In the PS2 and Windows versions, a fielding tutorial called "Clanky's Coaching Box" and two new minigames, Fielder's Challenge and Baseball Darts, are also added. Furthermore, the non-GameCube versions give players the option to play at night on most fields for the first time.

Due to the switch to 3D, runners are now able to lead off their base and pitchers are able to pickoff runners. (In the previous SCUMM games, base stealing was simply a toggle command that only occurred after a ball or a non-fouled strike was pitched, with only the catcher attempting to pickoff runners.) Along with getting strikeouts, double plays, triple plays, or hits on power-up pitches as with previous games, players can also earn power-ups for pitching a hitless inning or making a diving catch.

Custom players, which were introduced to Backyard Sports in Backyard Football (1999) and to the Backyard Baseball series in Backyard Baseball 2001 (2000), can also earn additional skill points if they accomplish specific achievements in a game (a feature first introduced in Backyard Football 2002 [2001]), and teams can have multiple custom players (a feature first introduced in Backyard Basketball [2001]).

== Reception ==
Reception

Aggregate score
Aggregator	Score
Metacritic	NGC: 70/100

Review scores
Publication	Score
AllGame	NGC: 2.5/5
GameZone	NGC: 7.8/10; PS2: 8.0/10
Nintendo Power	3.4/5
Official U.S. PlayStation Magazine	2.5/5

The original GameCube version received an aggregate score of 70/100 on review aggregation platform Metacritic based on four reviews, indicating "mixed or average reviews". The later versions did not receive enough reviews on Metacritic to receive aggregate scores, with only two reviews verified for PlayStation 2 and none for Windows.

Nintendo Power gave the GameCube version an average score of 3.4 out of five stars from its five reviewers, saying, "The game's intuitive control makes it easy to pick up and play for gamers of any age or skill level."

Two separate reviews from GameZone, one in 2003 for the GameCube version and one in 2004 for the PlayStation 2 version, both gave the game scores at or near 8 out of 10, praising it for its gameplay, controls, multiplayer, and its appeal for younger players and families. However, the GameZone review for the GameCube version criticized it for lacking a tutorial (a feature that was added to the later PS2 and Windows versions, which GameZone's review for the PS2 version praised for including) and found the 3D graphics to be inferior to the older Backyard Baseball games' 2D graphics.

Scott Alan Marriott of AllGame gave the GameCube version two-and-a-half out of five stars. He criticized the GameCube game for long loading screens between innings, the game's ball physics for not being "realistic", its AI at the hardest difficulty for being overly aggressive, the game's seasons as being "too short", and the game's controls inferior to Midway Games' MLB Slugfest series, although he praised the game's action, theming, "energetic" characters that "will bring a smile to anyone's face", and "nicely detailed" 3D environments. He recommended that "parents should look to the [earlier] computer [games] first before purchasing the [GameCube game]."

Chris Baker of Official U.S. PlayStation Magazine gave the PlayStation 2 version 2.5 out of 5. Baker wrote, "Backyard Baseball has some cool things in store for its young audience, but it lacks the polish of a good game." He criticized its "horrible" controls, particularly for fielding and pitching, comparing it unfavorably to R.B.I. Baseball, although he also wrote in the pros section of his review that the game was "[g]enerally fun and lighthearted, easy for most kids to pick up and play," and had "the best baserunning of any current baseball game" at the time, which he also compared to R.B.I. Baseball's baserunning system.
