= Backyard Soccer (series) =

Video game series

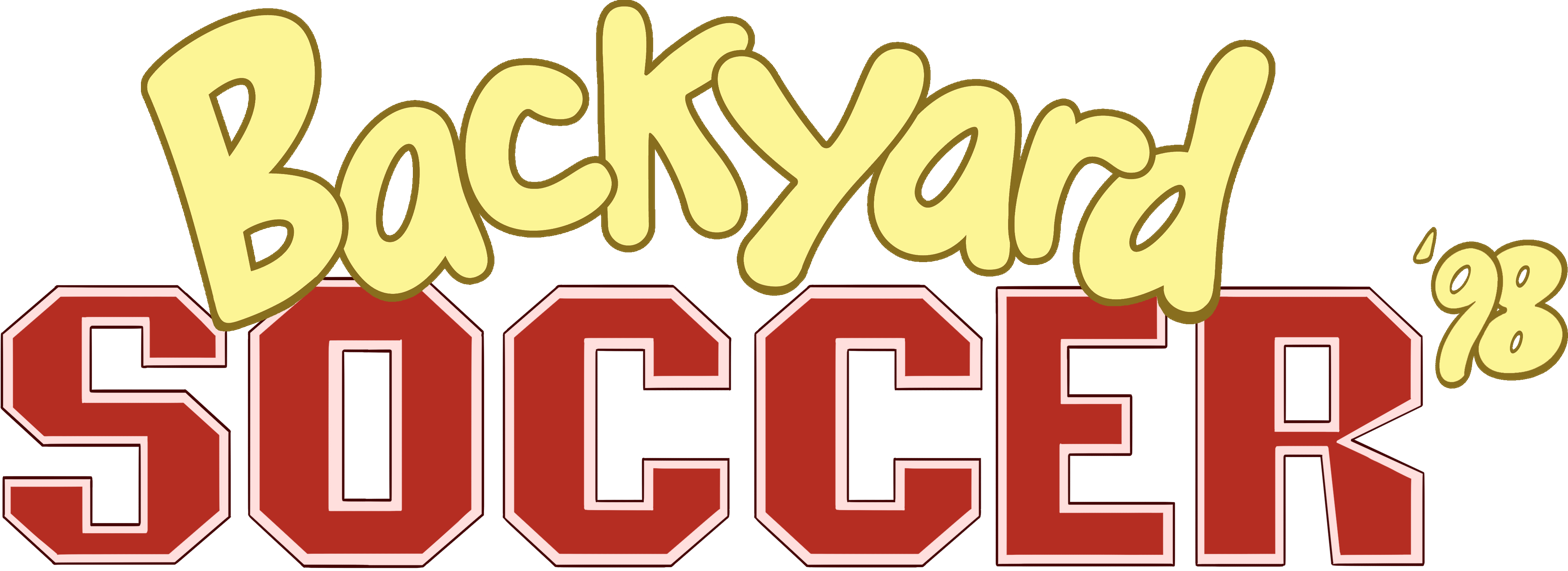
- The logo of Backyard Soccer '98 (2024), a remaster of the original Backyard Soccer (1998)
- Genre: Sports
- Developers: Humongous Entertainment (1998–2003); Runecraft (PlayStation version of Backyard Soccer); Mega Cat Studios (2024–present)
- Publishers: Humongous Entertainment (original); Infogrames (2000–2003); Playground Productions (2024–present)
- Platforms: Windows, Mac OS, PlayStation, iOS, Android
- First release: Backyard Soccer; October 13, 1998
- Latest release: Backyard Soccer '98; November 27, 2024
- Parent series: Backyard Sports

Backyard Soccer is a series of children's association football video games developed by Humongous Entertainment and published by Infogrames. It is the second of five sub-series in the Backyard Sports franchise. Three titles—Backyard Soccer (1998), Backyard Soccer MLS Edition (2000), and Backyard Soccer 2004 (2003)—were released in the series for Microsoft Windows and Mac OS, along with a port for PlayStation and a remaster of the first game.

== History ==
On September 9, 1997, a month before the release of Backyard Baseball, Humongous Entertainment announced that Backyard Soccer would be the second game for the franchise with a planned release in 1998. The game was later announced for a September release for Windows and Macintosh, though its release was delayed to October 13.

During the 1999 E3 event, Humongous Entertainment announced license deals with several professional sports leagues, including Major League Soccer, which would lead to newer Backyard Sports installments including younger versions of professional sports players as playable characters. On May 11, 2000, a sequel to Backyard Soccer was announced for release on the Game Boy Color in early 2001, though it was cancelled along with planned releases for Backyard Baseball 2001 and Backyard Football 2001 for said console. Despite this, the sequel for Backyard Soccer was still released for Windows and Macintosh on October 3, 2000, under the title Backyard Soccer MLS Edition. The game featured 12 MLS players, each representing all of the league's then 12 soccer teams. USWNT players Brandi Chastain, Briana Scurry, and Tiffeny Milbrett also appeared in the game. In 2001, Backyard Soccer was ported to the PlayStation console.

A third title, Backyard Soccer 2004, was released on March 11, 2003; it featured the return of all three USWNT players as well as four MLS players who previously appeared in Backyard Soccer MLS Edition along with several new MLS players appearing, such as Bobby Convey, Chris Armas, Clint Mathis, Jay Heaps, Landon Donovan, and Tony Meola.

In 2024, following the remastered version of Backyard Baseball on Steam, more remasters of classic Backyard Sports games were revealed to be in production, with the original Backyard Soccer being among them. The remaster for Backyard Soccer, entitled Backyard Soccer '98, was launched on Steam on November 27, 2024. It was later ported to mobile devices on November 13, 2025.

== Installments ==
Title	Release date(s)	Platforms	Cover athlete(s)
Backyard Soccer	October 13, 1998	Mac OS, Windows	Original characters
Backyard Soccer MLS Edition	October 3, 2000	Mac OS, Windows	Brandi Chastain, Cobi Jones
Backyard Soccer	September 27, 2001	PlayStation	Original characters
Backyard Soccer 2004	March 11, 2003	Macintosh, Windows	Clint Mathis
Backyard Soccer '98	November 27, 2024 (PC); November 13, 2025 (iOS, Android)	Windows, iOS, Android	Original characters
