= Backyard Baseball (2026 video game) =

2026 video game

- Cover art from Steam featuring Pablo Sanchez (center) among several other "Backyard Kids" (Note: The characters in the background are, from to left-to-right, Angela Delvecchio, Stephanie Morgan, Dante Robinson, Kenny Kawaguchi, Pete Wheeler, and Achmed Khan.)
- Developer: Mega Cat Studios
- Publisher: Playground Productions
- Series: Backyard Baseball; Backyard Sports
- Engine: Unity
- Platforms: macOS; Windows; Nintendo Switch; Nintendo Switch 2; PlayStation 4; PlayStation 5; Xbox One; Xbox Series X/S
- Release: Windows, macOS: WW: July 9, 2026; Nintendo Switch, Nintendo Switch 2, PlayStation 4, PlayStation 5, Xbox One, Xbox Series X/S; TBA
- Genre: Sports
- Modes: Single-player, multiplayer

Backyard Baseball is a 2026 baseball video game developed by Mega Cat Studios and published by Playground Productions. The game was released for Microsoft Windows and macOS via Steam on July 9, 2026, with versions for Nintendo Switch, Nintendo Switch 2, PlayStation 4, PlayStation 5, Xbox One, and Xbox Series X and Series S planned. The game is the first original title in the Backyard Baseball series and the Backyard Sports franchise as a whole since 2015's Backyard Sports: Baseball 2015 and Backyard Sports: NBA Basketball 2015, the first console release in the franchise since 2010's Backyard Sports: Rookie Rush, and the first installment since the franchise was rebooted by Playground Productions in 2024.

== Gameplay ==
Backyard Baseball is an arcade baseball video game. The game features 24 customizable team logos and 11 different fields—all of which are reimaginings of the fields from the 1997 original Backyard Baseball—to choose from.

The game features several different game modes, including modes unique to this game. Returning modes from past games include Pick-Up Games, which are single games where players choose their teams and team players; Quick Play, where players are instantly put into a game with randomized teams; and Season Play, where players coach a team through a Backyard Baseball League (now initialized as the "BYB League" instead of the "BBL") season to try to lead their team to the playoffs, which have been reverted to the playoff system used in the original Backyard Baseball instead of the system similar to the Major League Baseball playoffs found in past MLB-licensed entries. New game modes include "Backyard Derby", a home run derby in which players have a time limit to hit as many home runs as possible from robot Mr. Clanky, who pitches normal pitches or "crazy" pitches depending on the player's choice; "Backyard Bash", a new version of the series's batting practice mode where players try to pop balloons by batting balls pitched by Clanky; and "Wiggle Ball", a 4-on-4 game of Wiffle ball (under a genericized name) played on a dedicated small cul-de-sac field.

The game features various difficulty settings, including harder difficulties meant for older players. Players can choose the time of day (day or night) for fields for the first time in the series since Backyard Baseball 2005 (2004), whereas most other games' fields were always played at preset times of day (usually daytime). The game has over 40 playable characters at launch; all 30 original "Backyard Kids", seven unlockable former Major League Baseball players as kids returning from Backyard Baseball 2001 (2000), and several other unlockable characters, including robot Mr. Clanky, commentators Sunny Day and Vinnie the Gooch, and a few notable generic kids from past games. Custom characters, a feature first introduced to Backyard Sports in Backyard Football (1999) and added to the Baseball games in Baseball 2001, are also in the game. Further characters, including more real-life MLB players (former and active) as kids, may come in future downloadable content releases.

Another feature for the game new to the franchise is collectible in-game trading cards, featuring artwork of the Backyard Kids and other elements of the game's universe by independent artists. They are unlocked from spending tokens, which are only earned through playing the game; no microtransactions are used to earn tokens.

== Development and marketing ==
In 2024, Playground Productions relaunched the Backyard Sports franchise with an animated trailer released on August 20, showing some of the franchise's "Backyard Kids" starting a game of baseball. This was followed later on October 10, 2024, with the Steam release of Backyard Baseball '97, a remaster of the original Backyard Baseball (1997) developed by series creator Humongous Entertainment. The remaster was handled by Mega Cat Studios, who would go on to remaster five later games in the Backyard Sports series, including Backyard Baseball 2001, the second entry in the Backyard Baseball series.

In November 2024, it was announced that Mega Cat was working on a new original Backyard Sports title. It was later announced in 2025 that the new Backyard Sports title will be released in 2026, following the release of an animated special, Backyard Sports: The Animated Special, in January that year. The Animated Special itself would reveal upon its release on YouTube that the new Backyard Sports game is a new Backyard Baseball game via a brief teaser shown between the special's last scene and the end credits.

The game was formally announced at the 2026 IGN Fan Fest on February 26, 2026. The announcement was accompanied by a trailer showing the game's 2D animated opening sequence before transitioning to franchise mascot Pablo Sanchez and the Backyard Sports clubhouse in the game's 3D environment. The game's Steam page also launched the same day, showing some screenshots of the game.

Playground Productions emphasized having the 2026 Backyard Baseball feel like a modernized take of the original 2D games in the series. In a March 2026 interview with Sports Illustrated, Playground's CEO and co-founder Lindsay Barnett said, "Technology has come a long way in 15 years; it's really exciting what we’re able to deliver. Being able to do this as a 3D game also allows us to do camera movements and updates and all sorts of things that the 2D game was not going to be able to do."

On April 9, 2026, the game's demo was released for Windows and macOS via Steam. The demo features the game's Backyard Derby mode at Steele Stadium. The demo is playable in single-player or local two-player multiplayer with Pablo Sanchez, Kiesha Phillips, and Kenny Kawaguchi as the available playable characters.

The game was initially announced to use the original four-point skill system for the players from the first three Backyard Sports games (including the 1997 original Backyard Baseball); this system was used in the game's April 2026 demo. However, it was switched to use the ten-point system that was used in all Backyard games since Baseball 2001 due to fan demand. (Note: Backyard Sports [@backyardsportsofficial]; (May 24, 2026). "We revealed Maria Luna and the 10 ball system for player skills this week on stream! Don't miss the next one 👏 Live Thursdays at 4pm CT on YouTube, TikTok, and Twitch ⚾️ Wishlist the new Backyard Baseball on Steam dropping July 9th! 💥" – via Instagram. Post comment from Playground Productions [@playground.productions]: "We heard your suggestions to return to the 10 ball card system. We’re hard at work to make this the best game ever for our fans.")

Upon the release of a cinematic trailer on June 4, 2026, Barnett confirmed that the game would have online and local co-operative multiplayer, which will be firsts for the Backyard Sports franchise. Playground Productions also stated that it plans for the game to be the beginning of a new shared universe that it calls the "Backyardiverse", which according to the publisher will be "a connected world where sports, storytelling, and culture all come together." In June 2026, it was announced that former Major League Baseball player Cole Tucker, a fan of the series, would be voicing Ricky Johnson in the game, while seven former MLB players—Jeff Bagwell, Jason Giambi, Vladimir Guerrero, Chipper Jones, Kenny Lofton, Mark McGwire, and Sammy Sosa, all of whom previously appeared as kids in Backyard Baseball 2001—would be returning as unlockable kid players in the game.

On July 7, 2026, two days before the game's Steam release, Playground Productions announced that the online multiplayer component of the game would not be available at launch. On September 15, 2026, the game received a large update featuring many bug fixes and gameplay refinements, including refining the batting to make hitting harder on higher difficulties and the addition of a "classic" swing style replicating the batting mechanics and swing spot of the original SCUMM-era Backyard Baseball games ('97, 2001, and 2003). Playground Productions also announced a roadmap the same month revealing that the next major update following the refinement update will add online multiplayer, followed by the console release some time later.

== Reception ==
Reception

Aggregate scores
Aggregator	Score
Metacritic	PC: 59/100 (Note: Based on six reviews)
OpenCritic	22% recommend (Note: Based on nine reviews)

Review score
Publication	Score
IGN	5/10

Backyard Baseball received an aggregate score of 59/100 for the Windows version on review aggregator site Metacritic, indicating "mixed or average" reviews, while 22% of critics recommended the game on OpenCritic.

Nico Vergara of IGN found the game's batting and pitching systems too easy, especially the former when the swing assist is turned on. When Vergara used mouse and keyboard controls, he won multiple games with shutout or landslide wins for his team, although he also found turning off swing assist made batting almost impossible. He also found the game's fielding to be slower and inferior to the version found in the 1997 original game, 2001, and the 2003 GameCube game.
