= Backyard Baseball 2001 =

2000 video game

- Cover art as taken from the game's AutoRun menu featuring a child caricature of Cal Ripken Jr. (Note: The other kids depicted on the cover are some of the fictional "Backyard Kids". The catcher is Stephanie Morgan. The cheering kids in the audience are, from left to right, Maria Luna (partially obscured), Pablo Sanchez, Vicki Kawaguchi, Marky Dubois, and Gretchen Hasselhoff (partially obscured). On the remaster's key art, which recreates the original's cover art, Maria Luna and Gretchen Hasselhoff are replaced by Tony and Angela Delvecchio, respectively, while Dante Robinson appears above Ripken. Ernie Steele initially replaced Ripken on the remaster's key art until the MLB license and the rights to Ripken's name and likeness were secured.)
- Developer: Humongous Entertainment
- Publisher: Humongous Entertainment
- Series: Backyard Baseball; Backyard Sports
- Engine: SCUMM
- Platforms: Windows, Macintosh
- Release: Windows, Macintosh: NA: June 6, 2000
- Genre: Sports video game
- Modes: Single-player, multiplayer

Backyard Baseball 2001 (Note: Titled as Backyard Baseball, 2001 Edition within Windows, as seen in the taskbar and the title bar when running in windowed mode.) is a baseball video game developed and published by Humongous Entertainment. It is the fourth installment of the Backyard Sports franchise, the second installment of the Backyard Baseball series, and the first Baseball installment to include Major League Baseball teams and a MLBPA license. The game was released for Windows and Macintosh on June 6, 2000. Cal Ripken Jr. appears on the game's cover, along with other fictional characters.

A remastered version of this game, retitled as Backyard Baseball '01, was released for Windows (via Steam) and mobile devices on July 8, 2025, following Backyard Baseball '97 and Backyard Soccer '98. The remaster is mostly identical save for three of the original professional players replaced by generic kids.

== Gameplay ==
Gameplay screenshot with Randy Johnson as pitcher for the Arizona Diamondbacks (matching the team he played for in real life at the time of release) and Cal Ripken Jr. as batter for the fictional "Fishes" (team adjective unknown). This was the first Backyard Baseball game to feature major league players.

The gameplay of Backyard Baseball 2001 is mostly the same as in the first Backyard Baseball title and retains all of the original game's modes: Single Game (formerly Pick-Up Game), Season Play (formerly League Play), Batting Practice, Spectator, and Tee-Ball, with the addition of a mode called Online Play, which allows players to compete with each other worldwide; this mode is only available for Windows users. With the new Major League Baseball license, the player has the ability to choose a major league team to play in pick up play and season mode, in addition to six of the original custom teams. Season Play has been revamped from the original game: the player can now choose the pick-up-play fields to play at home and regular season and postseason has been modified to resemble the real-life MLB, including the National and the American League's three divisions and renaming the postseason's rounds to resemble the Major League Baseball postseason, including the Backyard World Series.

The game has a revamped menu interface differing from the original release, with menu tabs allowing for quicker, easier navigation, the ability to track the stamina of all players on the player's team (rather than just the player's current pitcher during pitching) and being able to see if a player's stats have been temporarily buffed or nerfed. It also switches the playable characters' displayed skill points from the four-point system used in the first three Backyard Sports games (Backyard Baseball [1997], Backyard Soccer [1998], and Backyard Football [1999]) to a ten-point system, allowing for a more accurate reflection of the players' stats (including the aforementioned temporary buffs and nerfs). Additionally, players now earn batting power-ups for getting double plays or triple plays on defense alongside the pre-existing condition of hitting a special pitch, which are still only earned through getting strikeouts on offense.

=== Playable characters ===
Along with the original 30 playable children characters (the Backyard Kids), Backyard Baseball 2001 introduces child caricatures of 31 professional baseball players into the game's roster, (28 in the 2025 re-release) each of which represent one of the Major League Baseball teams. The game also allows players to create a character to play in a baseball game with the player being allowed to pick a design, nickname, and a limited number of skill points for them.

== Development ==
At the 1999 E3 event, Humongous Entertainment announced license deals with the MLBPA, along with the NFLPA and the MLSPA; the announcement teased a new Backyard Baseball installment. More details of the game were given the following year, including its title, Backyard Baseball 2001 and the addition of 31 real-life professional baseball players and 30 Major League Baseball teams. To promote the game, Humongous Entertainment hired baseball player Cal Ripken Jr. as a spokesperson. (Note: Ripken would also tweet about the Backyard Baseball '01 remaster upon its release in July 2025.)

Each MLB team is represented by one professional baseball player, with the exception of the Cincinnati Reds, which is represented by both Barry Larkin and Ken Griffey Jr. due to the latter's transition from the Seattle Mariners to the Cincinnati Reds late in the development of Backyard Baseball 2001.

== Legacy ==
Following the release of Backyard Baseball 2001, more sequels of Backyard Baseball were released, starting with Backyard Baseball 2003, which was released in 2002.

=== Remaster ===
Backyard Baseball '01
- Developer: Mega Cat Studios
- Publisher: Playground Productions
- Series: Backyard Baseball; Backyard Sports
- Platforms: Microsoft Windows, iOS, Android
- Release: Windows, iOS, Android: WW: July 8, 2025
- Genre: Sports video game
- Mode: Single-player

Following the release of Backyard Baseball '97, a remastered version of the original Backyard Baseball title, a remaster of Backyard Baseball 2001 was announced for release on Windows via Steam under the slightly truncated title of Backyard Baseball '01. It was released on July 8, 2025, on Steam and mobile devices. As with Backyard Baseball '97, it was developed by Mega Cat Studios and published by Playground Productions. It is the only sequel entry among the five Backyard Sports sub-series (Baseball, Soccer, Football, Basketball, and Backyard Hockey) to be remastered, as all the other sub-series only saw their first entries remastered, and the only remaster to maintain its original sports league license, as the National Football League and the National Hockey League did not return for the respective remasters of Backyard Football '99 and Backyard Hockey '02, likely due to Electronic Arts holding the exclusive video game rights to both through their Madden NFL and NHL series.

Every professional player from the original 2000 release except for Barry Bonds, Frank Thomas and Ken Griffey Jr. appear on the re-release; the three missing players are replaced with generic players with the same stats. (Note: Griffey is also replaced in the opening sequence by Mo Vaughn, then of the Anaheim Angels.) Furthermore, the remaster changes the Cleveland Indians to the Cleveland Guardians, (Note: See also Cleveland Indians name and logo controversy) removes "Oakland" from the Athletics' name, replaces the MLBPA license with the MLBPAA license, (Note: The MLBPA logo from the time of the original release still appears on the scoreboard during cutscenes.) and removes the digital scans of the professionals' trading cards (as Pacific Trading Cards, who provided the scans, was sold off in 2004). The remaster also removes online play from the original release, although it can be restored on the Windows release by editing an INI file.

== Reception ==
Backyard Baseball 2001 has received positive reviews from critics. The game received a score of 4.5 out of 5 from MacHome, a score of 89 out of 100 from Gamer's Pulse and a score of 3 out of 5 from PCMag. MacHome, in particular, praised the game's addition of real-life baseball players as playable characters and, while noting its online mode's exclusive availability on Windows, stated that children playing the game on Mac would still have plenty of the game's content to enjoy. Gamer's Pulse felt that the game was perfect for children but stated that its sound effects might annoy parents over time and that children might get too addicted to the game. PCMag gave Backyard Baseball 2001 a mixed review, saying that while the game was fun, it would be too difficult for younger players and uninteresting for older players.

=== 2025 remaster ===
Reviews of the game's remaster, Backyard Baseball '01, have praised its faithfulness to the original version. Massimo Marchiano of ClutchPoints, in particular, expressed appreciation towards Playground Productions and Mega Cat Studios for bringing Backyard Baseball 2001 to modern devices with his only criticism directed towards the mobile version's controls. In a 2026 review released the day before the release of the 2026 Backyard Baseball game, Chris Studley of New Baseball Media praised the game's simplicity and replay value.
