= Log Jammer =

Log Jammer may refer to:

- Log Jammer (Kennywood), a former log flume ride at Kennywood amusement park
- Log Jammers, a video game
