= Justice Duel =

2017 video game

- Developer: Mega Cat Studios
- Publisher: Mega Cat Studios
- Director: James Deighan
- Producer: Nick Mann
- Designer: Nate Flynn
- Composer: Mitch Foster
- Platform: Nintendo Entertainment System
- Release: 2017
- Genre: Platform
- Modes: Single-player, multiplayer

Justice Duel is a platform game developed and published by Mega Cat Studios. It was released on the Nintendo Entertainment System in 2017. Players battle one another while riding cybernetically enhanced eagles. The game plays similarly to Joust.

== Gameplay ==
The player controls a cyborg version of a past President of the United States riding a cybernetically enhanced eagle to duel either against other human players or the game's AI. The player duels by firing projectiles at their opponents; a level is completed once there are no remaining opponents. Players can pick up power-ups in the form of mines and traps to use against opponents. Justice Duel supports multiplayer for up to four players through the NES Four Score.

== Development ==
Besides Joust, the game's developers cite TowerFall and Balloon Fight as having inspired elements of the game's design.

=== Evercade release ===
Mega Cat Studios released Justice Duel in a compilation cartridge for the Evercade, along with several other titles from the studio, including Little Medusa, Log Jammers, and Coffee Crisis.

== Child's Play edition ==
In 2018, Mega Cat Studios released a special edition of Justice Duel to raise money for the charity Child's Play; it debuted at PAX East and was part of the Omegathon tournament. This special edition of the game features two additional playable characters: Della and Rod, who ride a duck and a quail, respectively.

== Reception ==
Justice Duel has received a generally positive reception from the press, being praised for its aesthetic and fast paced gameplay.
