= Backyard Sports =

Children's sports video game series and media franchise

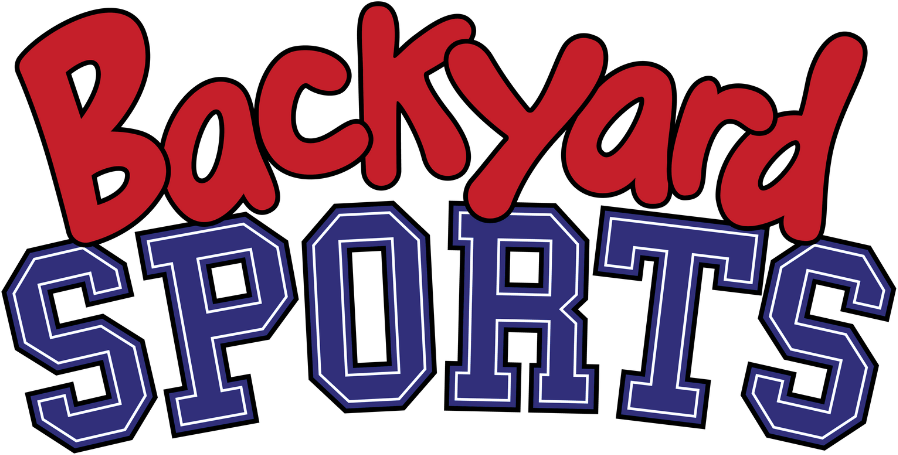
- Series logo as of 2024
- Genre: Sports
- Developers: Humongous Entertainment (1997–2005); Humongous, Inc. (2006–2010); Day6 Sports Group (2015); Mega Cat Studios (2024–present)
- Publishers: Humongous Entertainment (1997–2000); Infogrames (2000–2003); Atari (2003–2010); Fingerprint Network (2015); Playground Productions (2024–present)
- Platforms: Windows, Mac, PlayStation, Game Boy Advance, GameCube, PlayStation 2, Nintendo DS, Wii, Xbox 360, iOS, Android, PlayStation 5, Nintendo Switch
- First release: Backyard Baseball; October 10, 1997
- Latest release: Backyard Baseball; July 9, 2026
- Spin-offs: Backyard Baseball; Backyard Soccer; Backyard Football; Backyard Basketball; Backyard Hockey; Backyard Skateboarding

Backyard Sports (originally branded as Junior Sports and then Humongous Sports; also simply known as the Backyard franchise) is an American sports video game series and media franchise created by Humongous Entertainment and currently handled by Playground Productions. It primarily focuses on video games for children featuring simplified versions of various sports. It is best known for starring a diverse cast of fictional children as well as child versions of famous professional sports athletes. The video game series includes five sub-series based on different team sports—Backyard Baseball (baseball), Backyard Soccer (association football), Backyard Football (American football), Backyard Basketball (basketball), and Backyard Hockey (ice hockey)—as well as the single game non-team sport-based Backyard Skateboarding. The overall franchise also includes two animated specials, an upcoming animated series, and various merchandise.

Backyard Sports is currently or was previously licensed by the five major professional American sports leagues: Major League Baseball (MLB), Major League Soccer (MLS), the National Football League (NFL), the National Basketball Association (NBA), and the National Hockey League (NHL), as well as their affiliated players associations. Between Humongous's closure in 2005 and Playground Productions' 2024 reboot of the series, the series changed ownership and developers several times and endured a years-long hiatus from 2010 to 2024 (excluding a brief mobile game revival in 2015), with a reboot of Backyard Baseball released in 2026 as the first original game in the series since the 2015 mobile games.

In the games, players form a team consisting of Backyard Kids and (in most entries) professional athletes as children, which players take through a "Backyard League" season, attempting to become the champions of their chosen sport. Players can create their own custom characters in most entries starting with Backyard Football (1999). An additional aspect of the games is the use of power-ups, allowing players to gain powerful abilities. For instance, "Aluminum Power" gives the batter a powerful swing that almost guarantees a home run, "Super-Dunk" allows a basketball player to make a dunk from nearly anywhere on the court, "Leap Frog" allows a football player to jump over the entire defensive line, and "Ice Cream Truck" causes the other team to be distracted for a brief period.

== History ==
=== 1997–2005: Under Humongous Entertainment ===
The series began in late 1997 when Humongous Entertainment, owned by GT Interactive, created the first game in the franchise: Backyard Baseball. Backyard Baseball was conceived by then-Humongous illustrator Nick Mirkovich, who pitched the idea of a baseball game featuring children as the players with one of the company's co-founders. The idea was picked up in 1995 during the Seattle Mariners' first-ever playoff run that season.

Later, GT Interactive was purchased by Infogrames and was renamed as Infogrames, Inc. Infogrames allowed Humongous Entertainment to expand the series, and Humongous later developed more titles such as Backyard Soccer, Backyard Football, Backyard Basketball, Backyard Hockey, and Backyard Skateboarding. Following the buyout by Infogrames, these titles from the Backyard series were released for game consoles, including the GameCube, Game Boy Advance, PlayStation 2, Xbox 360, and Wii. In 2003, Infogrames, Inc. was renamed as Atari, Inc.

=== 2005–2010: Under Humongous, Inc. ===
In 2005, Atari laid off much of the development portion of Humongous Entertainment, renaming the company to Humongous, Inc. at the same time. In August, they sold Humongous to their majority parent Infogrames Entertainment SA for shares worth US$10.3 million. In October 2005, Infogrames announced that the relaunched Humongous brand would mainly focus on new entries in the Backyard Sports franchise.

In March 2008, Infogrames purchased the remaining shares of Atari, Inc. that they didn't own and renamed itself to Atari SA the following year. The two Atari businesses continued to release entries in the series within this time.

=== 2013–2020: Post-sale and attempted relaunch ===
In July 2013, private equity firm The Evergreen Group bought the Backyard Sports franchise and IP via its portfolio company, Epic Gear LLC, when Humongous Entertainment's parent, Atari, went through Chapter 11 bankruptcy proceedings in January 2013.

In February 2014, Day6 Sports Group acquired the franchise from Epic Gear. The company announced to relaunch the franchise in December with Backyard Sports NBA Basketball for smartphones and tablets, with Golden State Warriors point guard Stephen Curry as the cover athlete. Two mobile games, Backyard Sports: Baseball 2015 and Backyard Sports: NBA Basketball 2015, were released in February 2015. Day6's purchase of the brand also led to two film producers, Stuart Avi Savitsky and Ari Daniel Pinchot, who had long been interested in the IP since watching their children play Backyard Baseball in the early 2000s, acquiring the brand's film rights. Day6 did not release any further games afterward, as the company was acquired by a European investment group in 2016 and later went out of business in 2020.

In April 2019, Humongous's social media pages tweeted an image of the original Junior Sports logo, which led to ultimately false speculation about a possible re-release of the original games and/or the developer having re-secured the rights to the series proper.

=== 2020–present: New ownership and full brand relaunch ===
After Day6's closure in 2020, the franchise's intellectual property was purchased in full by Pinchot and Savitsky in 2021, establishing Backyard Sports LLC to manage the franchise's trademarks. The two producers kept the acquisition a secret as they did not have full plans on how to properly revive the IP. Around that time, during the COVID-19 pandemic, Chicago elementary schoolteacher Lindsay Barnett, a fan of the franchise since its early years, decided to revive the franchise after noticing during her online teaching classes that her students were playing video games that were inappropriate for their age group and discovering from them that they did not play sports games because of their difficulty. Barnett contacted intellectual property attorneys, including those who previously worked with Humongous, and then hired a private investigator to uncover the brand's current trademark owners. Despite not having the rights secured by then, Barnett resigned from teaching in 2022 and received private funding to establish Playground Productions LLC, hiring several individuals including animation producer and writer Chris Waters to help her with the brand.

Barnett eventually made contact with Pinchot and Savitsky in summer 2022 and negotiated with them over the course of a year, beginning to work together in relaunching Backyard Sports across gaming and other verticals. In January 2024, before Barnett reached an agreement with Pinchot and Savitsky, the franchise regained media attention when NFL player Jason Kelce, in an episode of his and his brother Travis's podcast New Heights, reminisced about playing Backyard Football and Backyard Baseball, and stated his desire to purchase the rights to the brand to develop a new game in the series, unaware of Pinchot and Savitsky's 2021 purchase and Barnett's own attempts to acquire the brand. Although the Kelce brothers' interests in acquiring Backyard Sports caused Barnett to worry about losing the franchise's rights to them, they ultimately never followed up on the idea, and Barnett acquired the franchise in March, with Pinchot and Savitsky retaining co-ownership of the film and television rights.

Backyard Sports received further attention in August 2024 when Bobby Witt Jr. of the Kansas City Royals used a baseball bat themed after Pablo Sanchez, a popular character in the series, to hit a home run against the Cincinnati Reds during Major League Baseball's Players' Weekend. Later that month, Playground Productions officially relaunched the franchise publicly by releasing an animated trailer featuring several of the Backyard Kids preparing to start a game of baseball.

As the source codes of the early games were lost, Barnett and Playground Productions enlisted the help of Backyard Sports fans—including Jim "Jibbodahibbo" Westerkamp, who alongside other fans hacked into early games to establish an online multiplayer league—and hired Pittsburgh-based developer Mega Cat Studios to reverse engineer and remaster some of the original games from CD-ROM copies. Six remastered classic titles were released throughout 2024 and 2025, including Backyard Baseball '97, Backyard Soccer '98, Backyard Baseball '01, Backyard Football '99, Backyard Basketball '01, and Backyard Hockey '02. Over 60 athletes from the original releases, such as Barry Sanders, Lisa Leslie, Dan Marino, and Mark McGwire, signed with Playground Productions to return for the remasters, with Major League Baseball also signing on to re-license its brand and trademarks (including all 30 MLB teams) for Backyard Baseball '01. Most of the remasters received releases on mobile devices. As of July 2026, the remasters have been downloaded over one million times. It was also announced in 2024 that a new original Backyard Sports title was in development at Mega Cat for a 2026 release, which was later revealed at the end of Backyard Sports: The Animated Special to be a new Backyard Baseball game. The Backyard Baseball reboot was released for computers on July 9, 2026.

== Characters ==
The series is known for its diverse cast of children characters, known as the "Backyard Kids", who vary in appearance, personality, and stats, with some kids being stronger in certain sports and weaker in others. The below lists only show the original characters of the franchise, excluding the real-life athletes who appear in the games.

=== Backyard Kids ===
==== The Original Thirty ====
These are the original Backyard Kids introduced by Humongous in 1997's Backyard Baseball. They all appeared in every game up until Backyard Skateboarding (2004), which featured only a limited selection of the kids as either playable characters or non-playable characters. From that game until the 2024 reboot, some of these kids were excluded in select games, especially from 2006 to 2010 when Atari, Inc. controlled the franchise.

- Achmed Khan: A Pakistani American boy who loves rock music to the point of wearing headphones all the time in most games. He is the lead singer and guitarist of a rock band featuring his younger brother Amir Khan and their cousins called the Knights of Rockville.
- Amir Khan: A Pakistani American boy who is the younger brother of Achmed Khan. He also loves rock music and serves as the drummer of the Knights of Rockville, although earlier games showed that he desired to play bass guitar. He often gets a stat buff if he's on the same team as Achmed.
- Angela Delvecchio: A tomboyish Italian American girl with a New York accent whose tomboyish personality is modeled after the Pink Ladies of the 1950s-inspired musical Grease (1971) and its 1978 film adaptation. She is the clumsiest player among the Backyard Kids. She has a sibling rivalry with her older brother Tony Delvecchio and usually gets a stat buff when playing against the team he's on and a nerf when they're both playing on the same team.
- Annie Frazier: A Caucasian American girl who has a peaceful, hippie personality.
- Ashley Webber and Sidney Webber: Caucasian American identical twin sisters who come from a rich family and enjoy tennis (despite the sport never being represented in the franchise). In most games, both sisters get a stat buff if they both play on the same team.
- Billy Jean Blackwood: A tall Caucasian American girl with a Southern belle personality. She loves fashion and aspires to be a model in Paris. She dislikes Marky Dubois and is usually nerfed when she plays on the same team as him.
- Dante Robinson: An African American boy with a large afro who is obsessed with food and is frequently hungry.
- Dmitri Petrovich: A Caucasian American boy who is the most intelligent Backyard Kid and resembles a stereotypical nerd. His middle name is "Ivan".
- Ernie Steele: A tall African American boy who likes to crack corny jokes and laugh. His backyard, Steele Stadium, is frequently featured in most games, particularly the Backyard Baseball games with its shallow center field with a shed and a neighbor's swimming pool outside left field.
- Gretchen Hasselhoff: A scatterbrained Caucasian American girl who likes to talk and talks fast.
- Jocinda Smith: An African American girl who likes playing baseball and basketball and has a passion for art.
- Jorge Garcia: A snobbish Hispanic American boy from a rich family who hates getting dirty. His full name is Jorge Raoul Luis Garcia III.
- Kiesha Phillips: A stocky, boastful African American girl who likes to make one-liners with pop culture references. Her middle name is "Monet".
- Kenny Kawaguchi: A Japanese American boy who is a paraplegic and thus plays sports in his wheelchair. He is also the older brother of Vicki Kawaguchi.
- Kimmy Eckman: A Caucasian American girl who is obsessed with candy and sweet foods and usually has the poorest stats, although she gets a stat buff if she plays in her backyard, Eckman Acres.
- Lisa Crocket: A Caucasian American girl with large glasses and a very stoic personality.
- Luanne Lui: An East Asian American girl who is the youngest Backyard Kid and the fastest girl. She is often seen holding her pink teddy bear named Teddy.
- Maria Luna: A Latina American girl who loves girly things including ponies and the color pink, to the point of wearing a pink dress regardless of the colors of the team she's on. In most games, putting her on a team wearing pink gives her a stat buff.
- Marky Dubois: A Caucasian American boy who is the redneck of the Backyard Kids. He usually plays barefoot and carries a pet frog (officially named "Matilda" as of the 2026 Backyard Baseball) with him. He also has a crush on Billy Jean Blackwood and usually receives a stat buff when playing on the same team as her.
- Mikey Thomas: An African American boy who is seemingly always sick and has peculiar interests. He is usually the slowest player but is balanced out by having good batting and defensive stats. His full name is Michael Rhett Thomas.
- Pablo Sanchez: A short Hispanic American boy who is regarded as the most athletically talented player among the Backyard Kids and is regarded as the franchise's mascot. He normally speaks Spanish in almost all his appearances, though English is his native language as revealed as an Easter egg in the original Backyard Baseball. His middle name is "Ramon".
- Pete Wheeler: A Caucasian American boy who is the fastest runner of the Backyard Kids but also the least intelligent. He speaks with a simpleton voice in the games, although The Animated Special removes this quality and slightly increases his intelligence to give him a sense of sarcasm.
- Reese Worthington: A short Caucasian American boy who is asthmatic and acts in an annoying manner, causing him to be seen as a "nerd" by the other kids, even Dmitri who better fits the stereotype.
- Ricky Johnson: An African American boy who is very shy and apologetic. His middle name is "Alexander".
- Ronny Dobbs: An African American boy who aspires to play like the bigger kids but is often a crybaby when things don't go well for him. He is particularly annoyed by his older sister Sally Dobbs, often getting nerfed when he's on the same team as her.
- Sally Dobbs: An African American girl who is considered to have a mother-like but bossy personality, particularly towards her younger brother Ronny Dobbs. She often gets a stat boost when she's on the same team as him.
- Stephanie Morgan: An African American girl who loves baseball and is incredibly talkative, although her speech is more cohesive than Gretchen Hasselhoff. She is also often depicted as having a fixation for bubble gum, to the point of it being the main plot point in The Animated Special.
- Tony Delvecchio: An Italian American boy whose personality is modeled after greasers of the 1950s. He is often seen sucking on a lollipop. His original theme song resembles the song "Greased Lightnin'" from the 1971 musical Grease and its 1978 film adaptation. He has a sibling rivalry with his younger sister Angela Delvecchio and usually gets a stat buff when playing against the team she's on and a nerf when they're both playing on the same team. His full name is Antony Gianni Delvecchio, although he dislikes his full first name.
- Vicki Kawaguchi: A Japanese American girl who loves ballet and is thus the most coordinated Backyard Kid. She is also the younger sister of Kenny Kawaguchi. Her middle name is "Fumiko".

==== Introduced in Atari-published games ====
These Backyard Kids were introduced by Atari, Inc. after they took control of the franchise from Humongous. They only appear in games released from 2006 to 2010, and do not return for the reboot.

- Ace "Acer" Patterson: A Caucasian American boy who is a military brat and a cocky but skilled football player. He and his team The Invincibles serve as the final opponent of the Story Mode to Backyard Sports: Rookie Rush, his only appearance in the series.
- Arthur Chen: An East Asian American boy who is quiet and reserved. He only appears in the 2006–2009 games.
- Jimmy Knuckles: A Caucasian American boy who is a bully. He is the captain of a team called "The Bullies" in Backyard Sports: Sandlot Sluggers. His middle name is "Winthorpe". He only appears in Sandlot Sluggers and Rookie Rush.
- Joey MacAdoo: A Caucasian American boy who loves sports to the point of overcompetitiveness. His middle name is "Richard". Mentioned by Vinnie the Gooch in the original 1997 Backyard Baseball, he becomes playable in the 2006–2009 games, and is the only kid from that era in the series to also be playable in Sandlot Sluggers and Rookie Rush.
- Samantha Pearce: An American girl who enjoys surfing. She only appears in the 2006–2009 games.

==== Introduced in the 2024 reboot ====
- Chase Downfield: A Caucasian American boy who is the younger brother of Backyard Football League color commentator Chuck Downfield. He was introduced as a replacement for Brett Favre in Backyard Football '99, the remaster of the original Backyard Football, due to Playground Productions being unable to get the rights to use Favre for the remaster.

=== Commentators ===
- Sunny Day (voiced by Jen Taylor from 1997 to 2001, Lani Minella from 2002 to 2003, Samantha Kelly from 2002 to 2009, Lindsay Barnett in the 2024 reboot era [for social media videos and trailers for the remastered games], and Ashleigh Crystal Hairston in The Animated Special): An African American girl who is the play-by-play commentator of the various Backyard Sports Leagues, appearing in the role in most games in the series. She becomes an unlockable playable character for the first time in the 2026 Backyard Baseball.
- Vinnie the Gooch (voiced by Dolores Rogers in Backyard Baseball and Backyard Baseball 2001, Lani Minella in Backyard Baseball 2003, and Lindsay Barnett in The Animated Special and Backyard Baseball [2026]): A Caucasian American boy who serves as the original color commentator of the Backyard Baseball League. He has a dry wit and a snarky personality. His full name, according to the 2026 Backyard Baseball, is Vinnious Vincenzo Theodore Giovanni Edward MacDonald Goocharello, and that he got his "Gooch" nickname (derived from "goocher") from a superstitious cousin named Nick. He also becomes an unlockable playable character for the first time in the same game.
- Earl Grey (voiced by Dolores Rogers in Backyard Soccer and Backyard Soccer MLS Edition and Lani Minella in Soccer 2004): A Caucasian English boy who serves as the color commentator of the Backyard Soccer League. His name is a pun on Earl Grey tea, which he normally has for Backyard Soccer matches.
- Chuck Downfield (voiced by Klem Daniels in most appearances and Dave Rivas in Backyard Football for GameCube): A Caucasian American boy who serves as color commentator of the Backyard Football League, which he used to play in before retiring due to a Charley horse injury. He is a parody of real-life football commentator John Madden.
- Barry DeJay (voiced by Dex Manley): An African American boy who is the color commentator of the Backyard Basketball Association. He is also a secret character in the Backyard Basketball games, in which he has perfect stats.
- Buddy Cheque (voiced by Dex Manley): A Caucasian Canadian boy who is the color commentator of the Backyard Hockey League. His name is a pun on the ice hockey term "body check". He is also a secret character in the Backyard Hockey games.
- Abner Dubbleplay (voiced by Adam Watson): A Caucasian American boy who serves as the second color commentator of the Backyard Baseball League, appearing in the Backyard Baseball GameCube and PlayStation 2 games and Backyard Baseball 2005. He speaks with a voice resembling those of old-time baseball announcers. Currently unused dialogue for the 2026 Backyard Baseball reveals that Vinnie the Gooch has an apparent dislike of Abner and doesn't like being replaced as commentator by him. His name is a pun on both Abner Doubleday (the supposed inventor of baseball) and the term "double play".
- Erik Stream: A Caucasian American boy who is the color commentator of the Backyard Skate Tour. His name is a pun on "air extreme". He is also an unlockable character in Backyard Skateboarding.
- Jack Fowler (voiced by Jim Curtis in Backyard Baseball '09 and Rhonda Soikowski in Backyard Baseball '10): A Caucasian American boy who serves as the third color commentator of the Backyard Baseball League.
- Ron and Wally: Two elderly men who commentate on the Backyard Kids' games in Backyard Sports: Sandlot Sluggers and Backyard Sports: Rookie Rush. They are among the few named adult characters to appear in the franchise (not counting the real-life pros).

=== Other characters ===
- Mr. Clanky: A robot made from various household appliances who is the "commissioner" of the Backyard Sports Leagues. He appears in the practice modes of some games, such as the pitcher in batting practice in Backyard Baseball, and the goalkeeper for penalty kick practices in Backyard Soccer. He is sometimes a secret or unlockable character who can be used in pick-up games, with the 2026 Backyard Baseball also allowing him to be used in Season Play. Othertimes, he serves as a referee, umpire, or official. In the Backyard Football games, he serves as the captain of an all-robot team called the Tackling Dummies, which serves as the player's opposing team when practicing.
- Practice Bots: Six tackling dummy robots, each numbered 1 through 6, who were built by Mr. Clanky to serve as practice opponents for the Backyard Kids. They and Clanky are part of a dedicated BFL team called the Tackling Dummies.

== Games in the series ==
Title	Released	Sport	Developer	Publisher	Platforms
Backyard Baseball	October 10, 1997	Baseball	Humongous Entertainment	Humongous Entertainment	Microsoft Windows, Macintosh
Backyard Soccer (Backyard Football in UK)	October 13, 1998; 1999 (UK)	Association football	Humongous Entertainment	Humongous Entertainment	Microsoft Windows, Macintosh
Backyard Football	October 28, 1999	American football	Humongous Entertainment	Humongous Entertainment	Microsoft Windows, Macintosh
Backyard Baseball 2001	June 6, 2000	Baseball	Humongous Entertainment	Humongous Entertainment	Microsoft Windows, Macintosh
Backyard Soccer MLS Edition	October 3, 2000	Association football	Humongous Entertainment	Infogrames	Microsoft Windows, Macintosh
Backyard Football 2002	September 19, 2001	American football	Humongous Entertainment	Infogrames	Microsoft Windows, Macintosh
Backyard Soccer (Junior Sports Football for PAL)	September 28, 2001 (US); November 3, 2001 (PAL)	Association football	Runecraft	Infogrames	PlayStation
Backyard Basketball	October 30, 2001	Basketball	Humongous Entertainment	Infogrames	Microsoft Windows, Macintosh
Backyard Baseball (GBA); Backyard Baseball 2003 (Windows, Mac)	May 30, 2002 (GBA); June 7, 2002 (Windows)	Baseball	Game Brains (GBA); Humongous Entertainment (Windows, Mac)	Infogrames	Game Boy Advance, Microsoft Windows, Macintosh
Backyard Football	September 25, 2002 (GBA); October 10, 2002 (GC)	American football	Torus Games (GBA); Left Field Productions / Humongous Entertainment (GC)	Infogrames	Game Boy Advance, GameCube
Backyard Hockey	October 18, 2002	Ice hockey	Humongous Entertainment	Infogrames	Microsoft Windows
Backyard Soccer 2004	March 11, 2003	Association football	Humongous Entertainment	Infogrames	Microsoft Windows, Macintosh
Backyard Baseball	April 15, 2003	Baseball	Humongous Entertainment	Infogrames	GameCube
Backyard Football 2004	September 4, 2003	American football	Humongous Entertainment	Atari	Microsoft Windows
Backyard Basketball 2004	September 4, 2003	Basketball	Humongous Entertainment	Atari	Microsoft Windows
Backyard Hockey	October 9, 2003	Ice hockey	Mistic Software	Atari	Game Boy Advance
Backyard Basketball NBA (Junior Sports Basketball for PAL)	October 21, 2003 (US); November 19, 2004 (PAL)	Basketball	Humongous Entertainment	Atari	PlayStation 2
Backyard Baseball (PS2); Backyard Baseball 2005 (Windows)	March 23, 2004 (PS2); June 22, 2004 (Windows)	Baseball	Humongous Entertainment	Atari	PlayStation 2, Microsoft Windows
Backyard Hockey 2005	September 21, 2004	Ice hockey	Humongous Entertainment	Atari	Microsoft Windows
Backyard Basketball	September 22, 2004	Basketball	Mistic Software	Atari	Game Boy Advance
Backyard Skateboarding	September 27, 2004	Skateboarding	Humongous Entertainment	Atari	Microsoft Windows
Backyard Baseball 2006	March 16, 2005	Baseball	Game Brains	Atari	Game Boy Advance
Backyard Football 2006	September 20, 2005 (Windows); October 4, 2005 (PS2); October 18, 2005 (GBA)	American football	Humongous Entertainment (Windows, PS2); Torus Games (GBA)	Atari	Microsoft Windows, PlayStation 2, Game Boy Advance
Backyard Skateboarding: Game of the Year Edition (Windows); Backyard Skateboarding (GBA)	October 4, 2005	Skateboarding	Humongous Entertainment (Windows); Full Fat (GBA)	Atari	Microsoft Windows, Game Boy Advance
Backyard Sports: Baseball 2007	June 12, 2006 (GBA); September 5, 2006 (PS2); September 11, 2006 (Windows); April 3, 2007 (GC)	Baseball	Game Brains	Atari	Game Boy Advance, PlayStation 2, Microsoft Windows, GameCube
Backyard Sports: Football 2007	September 26, 2006	American football	Torus Games	Atari	Game Boy Advance
Backyard Sports: NBA Basketball 2007	November 14, 2006 (GBA); February 13, 2007 (PS2); February 20, 2007 (Windows)	Basketball	Mistic Software (GBA); Game Brains (PS2, Windows)	Atari	Game Boy Advance, PlayStation 2, Microsoft Windows
Backyard Basketball	September 25, 2007	Basketball	Mistic Software	Atari	Nintendo DS
Backyard Hockey	October 9, 2007	Ice hockey	Mistic Software	Atari	Nintendo DS
Backyard Football '08 (PS2, Windows); Backyard Football (Wii, NDS)	October 16, 2007 (PS2, Wii); October 23, 2007 (Windows, NDS)	American football	FarSight Studios (PS2, Windows, Wii); Torus Games (NDS)	Atari	PlayStation 2, Wii, Microsoft Windows, Nintendo DS
Backyard Baseball '09	March 25, 2008 (Windows, NDS); June 10, 2008 (PS2, Wii)	Baseball	FarSight Studios (Windows, PS2, Wii); Mistic Software (NDS)	Atari	Microsoft Windows, Nintendo DS, PlayStation 2, Wii
Backyard Football '09	October 21, 2008 (PS2, NDS, Wii); October 29, 2008 (Windows)	American football	FarSight Studios (PS2, Wii, Windows); Torus Games (NDS)	Atari	PlayStation 2, Nintendo DS, Wii, Microsoft Windows
Backyard Baseball '10	March 26, 2009 (NDS); March 27, 2009 (Wii); April 28, 2009 (PS2)	Baseball	Mistic Software (NDS); FarSight Studios (Wii, PS2)	Atari	Nintendo DS, Wii, PlayStation 2
Backyard Football '10	October 20, 2009	American football	FarSight Studios	Atari	Wii, PlayStation 2, Xbox 360
Backyard Sports: Sandlot Sluggers	May 25, 2010	Baseball	HB Studios (Wii, 360); Powerhead Games (NDS)	Atari	Nintendo DS, Xbox 360, Wii
Backyard Sports: Rookie Rush	October 20, 2010	American football	HB Studios (Wii, 360); Powerhead Games (NDS)	Atari	Nintendo DS, Xbox 360, Wii
Backyard Sports: Baseball 2015	February 6, 2015	Baseball	Day 6 Sports Group	Fingerprint Network	iOS, Android
Backyard Sports: NBA Basketball 2015	February 6, 2015	Basketball	Day 6 Sports Group	Fingerprint Network	iOS, Android
Backyard Baseball '97 (Note: Remaster of an older game derived from a hacked CD-ROM copy of the game, as the original games' source code is lost.)	October 10, 2024 (Win); March 27, 2025 (iOS, Android); June 12, 2025 (PlayStation 5, Nintendo Switch)	Baseball	Mega Cat Studios	Playground Productions	Microsoft Windows, iOS, Android, PlayStation 5, Nintendo Switch
Backyard Soccer '98	November 27, 2024 (Win); November 13, 2025 (iOS, Android)	Association football	Mega Cat Studios	Playground Productions	Microsoft Windows, iOS, Android
Backyard Baseball '01	July 8, 2025	Baseball	Mega Cat Studios	Playground Productions	Microsoft Windows, iOS, Android
Backyard Football '99	September 9, 2025	American football	Mega Cat Studios	Playground Productions	Microsoft Windows, iOS, Android
Backyard Basketball '01	November 13, 2025	Basketball	Mega Cat Studios	Playground Productions	Microsoft Windows, iOS, Android
Backyard Hockey '02	November 13, 2025	Ice hockey	Mega Cat Studios	Playground Productions	Microsoft Windows
Backyard Baseball	July 9, 2026 (Windows, macOS); TBD (Switch, Switch 2, PS4, PS5, Xbox One, Xbox Series)	Baseball	Mega Cat Studios	Playground Productions	Microsoft Windows, macOS, PlayStation 4, PlayStation 5, Nintendo Switch, Nintendo Switch 2, Xbox One, Xbox Series X/S

== Other media ==
=== Animation ===
In 2002, a live-action animated hour-long special based on the Backyard Football games entitled NFL Backyard Basics: Football Tips from the Pros aired on CBS on November 16, featuring the then quarterback for the Philadelphia Eagles, Donovan McNabb.

On October 10, 2025, Playground Productions revealed that they had wrapped production on a fully-animated special, titled Backyard Sports: The Animated Special. A few weeks later, it was announced that the special would feature the voices of Tiffany Haddish, Arturo Castro, Christopher Mintz-Plasse, Donald Faison, Adam Pally, Ego Nwodim, Utkarsh Ambudkar, and Ashleigh Crystal Hairston. The 11-minute special was released on January 29, 2026 on YouTube. In July 2026, it was announced an animated series, Backyard Sports: The Animated Series, is currently in the works.

=== Proposed film ===
In 2016, Cross Creek Pictures and Crystal City Entertainment were reportedly in development of a film based on Backyard Sports with producers Brian Oliver and future franchise co-owner Ari Daniel Pinchot. Although no news about the film has been revealed since, Playground Productions announced new plans in 2024 to expand the franchise into film.
