= Bite the Bullet =

To bite the bullet ('to accept inevitable impending hardship') is a metaphorical idiom.

Bite the Bullet may also refer to:

== Arts, entertainment, and media ==
=== Music ===
==== Albums and EPs ====
- Bite the Bullet (EP), an EP by Black Tide
- Bite the Bullet (Hoodoo Gurus album), 1998
- Bite the Bullet (Sledgeback album)
- Bite the Bullet (Karl Wolf album), 2007
- Bite the Bullet (The Lee Thompson Ska Orchestra album), 2016

==== Songs ====
- "Bite the Bullet", a song on Alice in Chains' 1988 demo The Treehouse Tapes
- "Bite the Bullet", a song on Gillan's album Future Shock
- "Bite the Bullet", a song on Knut's album Challenger
- "Bite the Bullet", a song on Kon Kan's album Move to Move
- "Bite the Bullet", a song on Machine Head's album Through the Ashes of Empires
- "Bite the Bullet", a song on Motörhead's album Ace of Spades
- "Bite the Bullet", a song on Roadstar's album Glass Mountain
- " Bite the Bullet", a song on Neil Young's album American Stars 'n Bars

=== Other uses in arts, entertainment, and media ===
- Bite the Bullet (film), a 1975 American Western film
- Bite the Bullet, the official newsletter for the Birmingham Bullets Supporters Club
- Bite the Bullet!, a comedy production by Boom Chicago
- Bite the Bullet (video game), a 2020 video game by Mega Cat Studios

== Other uses ==
- Bite the Bullet, a Thoroughbred horse that won the 1989 Sanford Stakes
- Bite the bullet, in philosophy, to accept unpleasant consequences of one's assumed beliefs
