= Coffee Crisis =

2017 video game

- Developer: Mega Cat Studios
- Publisher: Mega Cat Studios
- Platforms: Genesis, Switch, PlayStation 4, Xbox One, Windows
- Release: February 24, 2017
- Genre: Beat 'em up

Coffee Crisis is a 2017 beat 'em up video game developed and published by Mega Cat Studios for the Genesis/Mega Drive and Microsoft Windows. The console version was released on February 24, 2017, as a physical cartridge with a printed manual.

== Plot ==
An evil race of aliens called the Smurgliens has watched Earth for years. Through their observations, they deduce that the best humanity has to offer is its wifi, cat videos, metal music, and coffee. Two baristas from the Black Forge Coffee House, Nick and Ashley, take it upon themselves to confront the threat after their coffee shop is invaded.

== Gameplay ==
Coffee Crisis is a side-scrolling brawler, reminiscent of games like Streets of Rage or Golden Axe. Players fight a variety of aliens and possessed humans, collecting power-ups and earning points, as they progress through numerous levels. Jumping and special maneuvers are also available.

The game was designed with cooperative play in mind, and offers two-player support. Players can play as either Nick Miller or Ashley Corts from the Black Forge Coffee House.

A PC version of Coffee Crisis was released in May 2018. This version features updated graphics, a new soundtrack, and a host of extra features, such as a special difficulty mode, integration with streaming platforms, and procedurally generated modifier items that change the gameplay on each playthrough.

== Development ==
The game started out when the owner of Mega Cat Studios met Nick and Ashley, the owners of the Black Forge Coffee House, at a fundraiser for the UPMC Children's Hospital in Pittsburgh and decided to collaborate. Out of a shared respect for retro gaming consoles, the owners decided that the game should be released on the Sega Genesis and Mega Drive, especially since Mega Cat Studios already had the equipment necessary to self-publish the game. Coffee Crisis runs on the Sega Genesis's and Mega Drive's original hardware.

The Black Forge Coffee House penned the story, while Mega Cat Studios did the art and programming. Pittsburgh metal band Greywalker provided music for the soundtrack. The game features many scenes and locations from around Pittsburgh, including PNC Park, Grandview Boulevard, and the Duquesne Incline.

== Release ==
The Windows version of the game was released on May 4, 2018, on Steam with updated art, music, and other features, including integration with Twitch and Mixer that allows viewers of the game to interact with the player. The game passed Steam's Greenlight process in under two weeks. This version of the game was later ported to the Xbox One, Nintendo Switch, and PlayStation 4.

Mega Cat Studios released Coffee Crisis in a compilation cartridge for the Evercade, along with several other titles from the studio, including Little Medusa, Log Jammers, and Justice Duel.

== Reception ==
Coffee Crisis received mixed reception, being praised for its sense of humor, music and inclusion of Pittsburgh locations and music, while being criticized for lack of modern features, such as the ability to block attacks. Critics also noted that the game's difficulty would sometimes suddenly spike, and that it wasn't always clear what was going on in game.
