= WrestleQuest =

2023 video game

- Developer: Mega Cat Studios
- Publisher: Skybound Games (Note: Mobile ports published by Netflix)
- Engine: Unity
- Platforms: Windows; Nintendo Switch; PlayStation 4; PlayStation 5; Xbox One; Xbox Series X/S; iOS; Android
- Release: August 22, 2023
- Genre: Role-playing
- Mode: Single-player

WrestleQuest is a role-playing video game developed by Mega Cat Studios and published by Skybound Games. It combines a pro-wrestling theme with elements from Japanese role-playing games. The game was released on August 22, 2023, for Windows, PlayStation 4, PlayStation 5, Xbox One, Xbox Series X and Series S and Nintendo Switch, as well as iOS and Android through Netflix.

== Gameplay ==
In WrestleQuest, players embark on an adventure in a world of professional wrestling-obsessed toys that include wrestling action figures (some based on real-life wrestlers) as well as teddy bears, dolls, robots, and Lego-like minifigs. They can perform different wrestling moves to rise through the ranks of fictional pro-wrestling promotions across various playsets. The game's story is about rescuing pro-wrestling from a scheming tyrant who wants to control the scripts for all wrestling events worldwide. Combat in the game is turn-based, and as players progress in the game, they will level up, manage a party of characters, and complete side quests.

The developers introduced several systems that capture the feel of a pro-wrestling match. Every battle happens in front of a live audience, and the Hype Meter shows how engaged the audience is. Using the same moves repeatedly bores the audience, causing the meter to drop and enemies to become stronger. If players use a variety of moves and wrestling strategies, they can increase the Hype Meter and unlock bonuses. Another wrestling element in combat is the pinning system. Some enemies can be defeated by reducing their hit points to zero, while others need to be pinned, like in a wrestling match. During pinning, players need to press buttons at the right time for each count. The game also includes other wrestling-related features. Players can customize their entrance routine, choosing theme music, pyrotechnics, and effects. Before boss fights, players can cut promos, verbally taunting their opponents. There are also different wrestling styles called Hype Types, such as Technician, Showman, Powerhouse, and others.

== Plot ==
WrestleQuest follows two protagonists, Muchacho Man and Brink Logan, as they aim to win championship titles in pro-wrestling. Muchacho Man (whose persona is modeled after "Macho Man" Randy Savage) is a newcomer who doesn't know that wrestling is scripted and is hoping to become the top professional wrestler in the world, while Brink Logan (whose literal "Hitman" gimmick is a nod to Bret "The Hitman" Hart) wrestles for his father's wrestling company and has seemingly accepted his lot in life as a "jobber-to-the-stars", a reliable professional who knows how to make his opponents look good. Both of these characters catch the attention of Mr. L. F. Font (a stuffed elephant), who owns PAW, the biggest wrestling organization. Mr. Font is not satisfied with just being at the top; he wants to control all of wrestling and uses aggressive business tactics and illegal methods to do so.

The paths of these characters cross as they fight to save not only the world but also the world of pro-wrestling and reality itself.

== Development ==
The team at Mega Cat Studios had long wanted to do an RPG, and many were wrestling fans. According to Manko, the team placed a large emphasis on developing the game's narrative. In WrestleQuest, characters have an action figure appearance, resembling toys. This design choice aims to evoke a sense of nostalgia, reminding players of their childhood playtime and the imaginative world of toys. The game features licenses with prominent professional wrestlers of different eras, with licenses from the Poffo family estate, the Rousimoff estate, Sgt Slaughter, Jeff Jarrett, Diamond Dallas Page, and the Hegstrand and Laurinaitis estates.

WrestleQuest was announced on March 16, 2022, during the ID@Xbox Showcase. Initially set to be released on August 8, 2023, it was delayed to August 23 as the developer needed additional time to remedy an issue related to saving game progress.

== Reception ==
Reception

Aggregate score
Aggregator	Score
Metacritic	69/100 (PC)

Review scores
Publication	Score
Game Informer	58/100
IGN	6/10
RPGFan	91/100

The PC version of the game received "mixed or average" reviews, according to review aggregator website Metacritic. RPGFan praised the game's visuals and audio, while also finding the game's general concept fun. Game Informer found that "while the gameplay is competent, the difficulty often feels all over the place."
