= Backyard Football (video game) =

1999 video game

- Jewel case variant of the cover art featuring a child version of Steve Young (background) and Backyard Sports characters Jocinda Smith (foreground, left) and Amir Khan (foreground, right).
- Developer: Humongous Entertainment
- Publisher: Humongous Entertainment
- Series: Backyard Football; Backyard Sports
- Engine: SCUMM
- Platforms: Windows, Classic Mac OS
- Release: Windows, Classic Mac OS: NA: October 28, 1999
- Genre: Sports video game
- Modes: Single-player, multiplayer

Backyard Football is an American football video game developed and published by Humongous Entertainment. It is the third installment of the Backyard Sports franchise, and the first installment of the Backyard Football series. Backyard Football became the first Backyard Sports title to include teams from a major league and real-life sports players, which would become a tradition for almost every other Backyard Sports game to follow. Backyard Football was released for Microsoft Windows and Mac via a hybrid CD-ROM on October 28, 1999. Similar to most other installments in the Backyard Sports franchise, Backyard Football was followed up by various sequels. Steve Young appears on the game's cover of the original release, redrawn as a kid.

The game was re-released under the title Backyard Football '99, on Windows (via Steam) and Android and iOS mobile devices on September 9, 2025. Due to licensing issues, this release replaced the names and logos of NFL teams with additional fictional teams and replaced Brett Favre with Chuck Downfield's little brother Chase Downfield.

== Gameplay ==
Backyard Football is an American football video game with five-on-five play designed to be simple to use for children. The game contains three game modes: Single Game, Season Play, and Online Play. Hall of Fame records and player cards are also visible on the home screen.

When playing a single game, the player can select one of five playable football fields, adjust the game's weather conditions, and play against either the AI or another player. Along with the 30 "Backyard Kids", Backyard Football includes eight young versions of NFL players as playable characters, being Jerry Rice, Randall Cunningham, Brett Favre, Barry Sanders, John Elway, Dan Marino, Steve Young and Drew Bledsoe and the option to create a custom player to play in a game. The 1999 version also featured the ability to choose NFL teams from the 1999 season. Play-by-play commentary is done by Sunny Day with fictional color commentator Chuck Downfield. The player has many offensive and defensive plays to choose from, as well as a few power-up plays.

In Season Play, the player drafts a 7-player team using either NFL or custom team branding through the "Backyard Football League", a 16 team, four division league based on the National Football League (Original Version only). If the team manages to win their division or be a conference wild card, they can qualify for the playoffs where the player's team can attempt to beat the other conference champion in the "Super Colossal Cereal Bowl", a spoof on the real life Super Bowl. Throughout the mode, the player can track and print season standings, player statistics and league leaders. They can also practice playing football against a robot team called the Tackling Dummies in between games.

In Online Play, players could connect to a website, known as the Junior Sports Network, allowing them to be able to play against other people around the world. This online mode, only available on Windows, featured many different modes of difficulties and rulesets. This feature was also included with Backyard Baseball 2001. However, when Humongous Entertainment was acquired by Infogrames in 2002, the servers were shut down due to underuse.

== Development ==
At the 1999 E3 event, Humongous Entertainment announced license deals with the National Football League, as well as Major League Baseball and Major League Soccer. Backyard Football, the third installment in the Backyard Sports franchise, is the first to include child versions of professional sports players as playable characters. To promote the game, Humongous Entertainment launched a marketing program, which included a commercial starring NFL player Jerry Rice, as well as sweepstakes to Super Bowl XXXIV.

== Legacy ==
Backyard Football's NFL license led to further Backyard Sports games to include sports licenses, including Backyard Baseball 2001 and Backyard Soccer MLS Edition, which were both released in 2000, following Backyard Football's launch. Backyard Football also spawned a series of sequels, starting with Backyard Football 2002. In 2021, a fan-made patch for Backyard Football was made available with ScummVM that relaunched online play.

== Remaster ==
Backyard Football '99
- Key art for the remaster as it appears on Steam in a user's library, recreating the original Backyard Football cover art, but with Pablo Sanchez replacing Steve Young, the NFL shield on the game logo replaced with a football, and the San Francisco 49ers and Green Bay Packers logos on the helmets replaced with the logos of fictional teams
- Developer: Mega Cat Studios
- Publisher: Playground Productions
- Series: Backyard Football; Backyard Sports
- Platforms: Windows, iOS, Android
- Release: Windows, iOS, Android: WW: September 9, 2025
- Genre: Sports video game
- Modes: Single-player, multiplayer

In 2024, former professional football player Jason Kelce announced through his and his brother Travis Kelce's podcast New Heights his intentions on acquiring the Backyard Sports franchise, including rebooting Backyard Football and Backyard Baseball. These plans never came into fruition as the rights were already purchased back in 2021 by producers Ari Pinchot and Stuart Avi Savitsky. Later the same year, the franchise was rebooted by Playground Productions.

Backyard Football was remastered by Mega Cat Studios for Windows (via Steam), Android, and iOS and released by Playground Productions on September 9, 2025 as Backyard Football '99. The remaster is the fourth remaster released in the series as part of the 2024 reboot of the Backyard Sports franchise. The remaster does not have the NFL license; all the NFL teams and logos from the original release were removed and are replaced by fictional teams, which are a mixture of teams originally made for Backyard Soccer (1998) and ones made for Backyard Football 2002, Backyard Football 2004, and Backyard Football 2006, and all references to the NFL were removed. However, the remaster retains all the original professional players from the original release except Brett Favre, who is replaced with a new backyard kid named Chase Downfield, the younger brother of in-game color commentator Chuck Downfield. Like with the Backyard Baseball '01 remaster, Football '99 also removes the online play from the original release, although it can be restored on Windows by editing an INI file. The Steam version of this release includes the added feature of achievements, with a total of 23 connected to in-game categories such as winning games, completing a perfect season, and offensive yardage statistics.

== Reception ==
Reception

Review scores
Publication	Score
MacHome	4/5
AllGame	4/5
Mac Gamer	90%

Backyard Football had received positive reviews from critics. John Lee of MacHome rated the game 4 out of 5 stars, praising the gameplay and inclusion of NFL players, but he expressed disappointment at the fact that only eight of those players were included in the game. Lisa Karen Savignano of Allgame also rated the game 4 out of 5 stars, citing the game's good use of cartoonish graphics and the game's very high replay value. Greg Weston from Mac Gamer gave it 90%, detailing the simple pick-up gameplay and value but criticizing the Windows-only online mode and the repetitiveness of the gameplay.
