= Backyard Baseball (1997 video game) =

1997 video game

- Cover art as taken from the game's AutoRun menu. Depicted are four of the game's "Backyard Kids"; clockwise from center: Pablo Sanchez, Maria Luna, Pete Wheeler, and Stephanie Morgan.
- Developer: Humongous Entertainment
- Publisher: Humongous Entertainment
- Series: Backyard Baseball; Backyard Sports
- Engine: SCUMM
- Platforms: Microsoft Windows, Classic Mac OS
- Release: Windows, Classic Mac OS: NA: October 10, 1997
- Genre: Sports video game
- Mode: Single-player

Backyard Baseball is a baseball video game developed and published by Humongous Entertainment. It is the first video game released for the Backyard Sports franchise (originally known as the Junior Sports series) and the long-running Backyard Baseball series. The game was released on a hybrid Windows and Macintosh CD-ROM on October 10, 1997.

In the years following Backyard Baseball's release, Humongous Entertainment released several spin-off titles, including Backyard Soccer (1998), Backyard Football (1999), Backyard Basketball (2001), Backyard Hockey (2002), and Backyard Skateboarding (2004). A sequel to Backyard Baseball, entitled Backyard Baseball 2001, was released in 2000.

The game was remastered in 2024 as Backyard Baseball '97. The remaster was released for Windows via Steam on October 10, exactly 27 years after the original's release. It later received ports for iOS, Android, Nintendo Switch, and PlayStation 5 in 2025.

== Gameplay ==
Backyard Baseball is a baseball sports video game designed for and aimed at children. There are three main modes: Pick-Up Game, League Play and Batting Practice. A spectator mode exists which pits two randomly chosen computer-controlled teams together. The player can also view their trophies won, their records and view baseball cards of the characters.

Before playing a pick-up game or starting a season, the user can change the set difficulty, toggle tee-ball (in Pick-Up Play only), switch from 6- or 9-inning games, and toggle errors. In both modes, a player can create their own team by customizing their team's name and color and drafting nine players from a pool of thirty characters. During the game, there are many cartoonish power-ups that can be used either by the pitcher (earned by recording a strikeout) or by the batter (earned by getting a hit on a power-up pitch when playing offense).

In the pick-up play mode, the player can choose a field from seven different fields of varying size, configuration, and playing surface: for example, the field Tin Can Alley makes it unique, due to the pavement surface and the difficulty of hitting a usual home run due to the outfield boundaries. After creating their own team, the player takes turns drafting their players against a computer. In league play, the player is restricted to one field, the Parks Department Field No. 2.

In league play, the player signs a coach in the Backyard Baseball League. The player guides their chosen team through a 14-game season against 7 other league teams. At the end of the season, once the team wins enough games to place first or second in their league, their team plays against the other qualified team to win the league pennant in the best-of-3 All-City BBL Playoffs. Once the team wins the pennant, the team is invited to play in the postseason tournament, starting with the best-of-3 Super Entire Nation Tournament, and then the Ultra Grand Championship of the Universe (analogous to the real-life World Series).

=== Characters ===
The game has been positively received for its widely diverse cast, shown here with most of the characters.

The game features 30 fictional children evenly split between 15 boys and 15 girls, rated from 1 to 4 in batting, running, pitching and fielding. One notable character is Pablo Sanchez, a small, Spanish-speaking boy whose skill in batting and running ultimately led to him becoming an iconic character in the series. The game has been notable for its wide range of diversity within its cast.

== Development ==
Backyard Baseball was conceived by Nick Mirkovich, who took inspiration from various baseball-themed movies focusing on children such The Sandlot (1993). The project was later put into action during the 1995 American League Division Series. Backyard Baseball was first revealed at the 1997 E3 in June.

== Reception ==
Reception

Review scores
Publication	Score
Computer Gaming World	3/5
GameSpot	8/10 (remaster)
MacHome	3/5

Backyard Baseball was released to moderate reviews: the game was praised for its diversity and Computer Gaming World cited the easy to learn difficulty.

=== 2024 remaster ===
Reviews of the 2024 remaster noted that it was functionally identical to the original release. GameSpot viewed this as a missed opportunity to implement some quality-of-life features. Sports Gamers Online praised the game's mobile version for its presentation and lack of advertisements, microtransactions, or internet requirement. The Otaku Authority stated that the game worked surprisingly well on consoles. In a more critical review, My Gamer felt that porting a 28-year-old video game to modern platforms was unnecessary.

== Legacy ==
The success of Backyard Baseball led to the release of more Backyard Sports titles, including updated versions of Backyard Baseball, starting with Backyard Baseball 2001, which would be the first Backyard Baseball game to include Major League teams and professional sports players, a tradition started in Backyard Football.

=== 2024 remaster ===
Backyard Baseball '97
- Developer: Mega Cat Studios
- Publisher: Playground Productions
- Series: Backyard Baseball; Backyard Sports
- Platforms: Microsoft Windows, iOS, Android, PlayStation 5, Nintendo Switch
- Release: Windows: WW: October 10, 2024; iOS, Android: WW: March 27, 2025; PlayStation 5, Nintendo Switch: WW: June 12, 2025
- Genre: Sports video game
- Mode: Single-player

A remaster of Backyard Baseball entitled Backyard Baseball '97 was released for Microsoft Windows on October 10, 2024, via Steam, as part of the Backyard Sports franchise. The remaster was developed by Mega Cat Studios and published by Playground Productions. A hacked CD-ROM copy of the game was used as basis for the remaster, as the source code of the original game has been lost; as a result, the remaster only initially supported Windows. The remaster supports several Steam features not found in the original release, including leaderboards, achievements, and cloud saves. The remaster is Steam Deck-verified and supports the use of gamepads, which were not supported in the original release.

A post-launch update on November 7 added the use of "Crowd Control", a feature available on streaming services that allows viewers to add various gameplay effects during live video game streams. A mobile port of the game was released on March 27, 2025, coinciding with the opening day of the 2025 Major League Baseball season. On June 12, 2025, the game was ported to the PlayStation 5 and Nintendo Switch consoles. An Xbox port is also planned.

On October 10, 2025, exactly one year after the remaster's release, Playground Productions and Mega Cat Studios announced a partnership with Lucra, introducing a Tournament mode to the game's iOS version where players can compete in events to earn prizes.
