= Bite the Bullet (video game) =

2021 video game

- Developer: Mega Cat Studios
- Publisher: Graffiti Games
- Director: James Deighan
- Producer: Nick Mann
- Designer: Nate Flynn
- Composer: Mitch Foster
- Engine: Unity
- Platforms: Linux; macOS; Windows; Switch; Xbox One; PlayStation 4
- Release: Linux, macOS, Windows, Switch; August 13, 2020; Xbox One; August 14, 2020; PS4; February 24, 2021
- Genres: Role-playing, roguelite
- Modes: Single-player, multiplayer

Bite the Bullet is a role-playing roguelite shooter developed by Mega Cat Studios. It was released for Linux, macOS, Microsoft Windows, Nintendo Switch, and Xbox One in August 2020, and PlayStation 4 on February 24, 2021. The game is a run, gun, and eat, and features arcade-inspired run and gun action combined with various eating mechanics. Bite the Bullet received mixed reviews from critics.

== Gameplay ==
Bite the Bullet is a platform game in which players control a mercenary with the ability to consume enemies and parts of the environment. As the player progresses through the game, they are given the option to upgrade their character's attributes and abilities, such as the ability to freeze attacking enemies, via several diet-based skill trees and character classes. For example, the vegan Slaughterer of the Soil skill tree can only consume plants, while Gorivores can eat meat-based enemies and food objects.

During a level, players can either destroy enemies outright with their weapons, or stun them and eat them. Combat becomes a series of trade-offs, as killing enemies outright is quicker and easier, while stunning and consuming them is more dangerous, as it leaves the player exposed to other threats while eating. Eating enemies, however, is necessary for the game's other systems.

Consuming enemies adds fat, calories and protein to the player. The amount of each of these can change the player character's body composition and size. For example, characters with excessive amounts of fat will become larger and move slower, but will take less damage. If players consume enemies or items which are "rotten", the game enters a "gut-crafting" mode, in which players are given the opportunity to modify and enhance their weapons using calories, protein and fat picked up from consuming enemies. After consuming enough enemies, players can enter "Zombro" mode in which they lose access to their weapons while invulnerability, speed, jump height, and the ability to melee attack enemies.

Bite the Bullet also features an in-game metabolism, and every action, from moving and jumping to shooting and using abilities, expends calories, protein, and fat.

Enemies will sometimes drop weapons with unique modifiers with food-based names, such as the "Sprouted" modifier which causes tangling plants to grow at an enemy's feet, trapping them in place.

== Plot ==
Bite the Bullet takes place in a futuristic, dystopic setting; mankind suffered a food crisis that resulted in the invention of "bionodes", implants that enabled humans to consume inorganic matter, but also resulted in mutations. The mutated humans, dubbed "ghouls", were left behind on Earth as the rest of humanity colonized other planets in an event known as the Great Exodus.

The game follows a pair of mercenaries. Chewie and Chewella, tasked with collecting DNA from Earth's ghouls by eating them. Collected ghoul DNA becomes part of the Compendium, a database of all organic matter and genetic information in the galaxy. The player's employer, Vora, is the CEO of the DarwinCorp, the megacorporation that runs the Compendium and assigns missions to the mercenaries.

As the game progresses, Chewie and Chewella encounter members of the ghoul resistance and begin to question their mission.

== Development ==
Bite the Bullet was announced by Mega Cat Studios in June 2019 via a blog entry on their official website. Besides the Windows version, the game was also developed for Linux, Xbox One and Nintendo Switch. The game was also released on the PlayStation 4 in February 2021.

Additionally, Mega Cat Studios added a Synthwave Mode, which features altered visuals and songs from synthwave musicians Waveshaper, Night Runner, Retroxx, and Magic Sword.

== Reception ==
Both the Xbox One and the Nintendo Switch versions of Bite the Bullet received "mixed or average reviews" according to the review aggregator Metacritic.

Reception

Aggregate score
Aggregator	Score		
Aggregator	NS	PS4	Xbox One
Metacritic	(NS) 61/100	N/A	64/100

Review scores
Publication	Score		
Publication	NS	PS4	Xbox One
Nintendo Life	6/10	N/A	N/A
Nintendo World Report	5.5/10	N/A	N/A

The game was featured as part of the Indie Megabooth during PAX East 2019 and 2020; press at the event described the game as being "like Contra with a twist". The game was also featured as part of 2019's Media Indie Exchange in Seattle and Los Angeles.
