= Renfield: Bring Your Own Blood =

2023 video game

- Developer: Mega Cat Studios
- Publisher: Skybound Games
- Platform: Windows
- Release: September 20, 2023
- Genres: Horror, roguelike, shoot 'em up
- Mode: Single-player

Renfield: Bring Your Own Blood is a 2023 horror roguelike shoot 'em up video game developed by Mega Cat Studios and published by Skybound Games, which is based on the action horror film Renfield, directed by Chris McKay and starring Nicholas Hoult and Nicolas Cage. Following an early access release on April 12, it was released for Windows on September 20, 2023.

== Gameplay ==
The player selects one of multiple characters including Robert Montague Renfield, Count Dracula, Rebecca Quincy, Bat Head, Cheerleader, Gore Golem, Mark, Mina Harker, the Red Death, Remy Broussard, Richard the Werelobo, Sister Charlotte, Teddy Lobo and the Maestro. The player character can use various weapons as well as different bonuses that can be unlocked as the player levels up. The player can also consume bugs for various boosts and effects. Throughout levels, players can also find victims, who can be sacrificed to Dracula or saved, leading to a boss fight at the end of the level.

== Release ==
The game left early access and was released on September 20, 2023, on Windows.
