= Mega Cat Studios =

American video game company

- Type: Private
- Industry: Video games
- Founded: 2015; 11 years ago
- Headquarters: Pittsburgh, Pennsylvania, United States
- Products: Bite the Bullet
- Number of employees: 24
- Website: megacatstudios.com

Mega Cat Studios is an American video game developer and publisher located in Pittsburgh, Pennsylvania. It was founded in 2015 by James Deighan, Nick Mann, and Zack Manko.

Mega Cat develops and publishes games for computers, consoles, virtual reality, and physical copy games for video game consoles, such as the Sega Genesis and the Nintendo Entertainment System. The company also publishes physical releases for other retro developers, such as Old Towers by Retrosouls. As of 2024, they are also the primary developers of the Backyard Sports franchise after it was rebooted the same year by its current rightsholder Playground Productions, beginning with a series of remasters of several games originally developed by series creator Humongous Entertainment followed by original titles beginning with Backyard Baseball (2026).

== History ==
Mega Cat was founded in Pittsburgh, Pennsylvania by James Deighan, Nick Mann and Zack Manko in 2015; they, alongside Nathaniel Wilson, Andrew Marsh, and Lauri Coderbrah produced the studio's first game, Almost Hero, for the Nintendo Entertainment System, which generally received a positive reception. A major element of their business model of publishing new video games for "retro systems" has involved including a physical manual and case for each of their releases. Founder James Deighan says that the studio has sought to "recreate that experience of being in the back of your mom’s van coming back from Hills [a department store], opening up the game and reading the instruction manual on the way home."

In February 2017, Mega Cat published Coffee Crisis for the Sega Genesis. The game was their first to later receive a Windows port with enhanced features, such as additional modes, a procedurally generated roguelite modifier system, and improved graphics, and was later released on the Xbox One, PlayStation 4, and Nintendo Switch. The Windows version of Coffee Crisis was published in conjunction with Zerouno Games.

To avoid having to bring in investors or otherwise raise funding early on in the studio's history, Mega Cat focused on a balancing contracted work for various brands while continuing work on their own IP. The studio has done contract work for such clients as the Pittsburgh Pirates, Devolver Digital, and Columbia Records.

The studio has run crowdfunding campaigns on Kickstarter for Coffee Crisis, Log Jammers and Phantom Gear. Prior to its crowdfunding campaign, Log Jammers had been an official selection of the 2018 Indie Megabooth and won both the "Best Digital Game Play" and the "Digital Game of the Year" award at Gameacon 2017.

A number of the studio's games were featured as part of the Indie Megabooth, including the aforementioned Log Jammers as well as Little Medusa, Coffee Crisis, and Fork Parker's Crunch Out.

In 2020, ten of the studio's published games were included in a cartridge for the Evercade gaming system.

In 2024, it was announced that Mega Cat Studios is collaborating with Playground Productions in rebooting the Backyard Sports franchise, which was originally created by Humongous Entertainment. Mega Cat remastered several early Backyard Sports titles, and developed a new Backyard Baseball game released in 2026 simply titled Backyard Baseball.

In 2026, the studio was announced as the main developer of a side-scroller spin-off and a prequel in Sony Interactive Entertainment's God of War franchise, titled Sons of Sparta. The game was released on the PlayStation 5 the very day it was announced during the February PlayStation State of Play.

== Games ==
Year	Title	Platform(s)	Developer(s)
2016	Almost Hero	Nintendo Entertainment System	Mega Cat Studios
2016	Dushlan	Nintendo Entertainment System	Peter McQuillan
2017	City Trouble	Nintendo Entertainment System	Den Kat Games
2017	Coffee Crisis	Sega Genesis, Windows	Mega Cat Studios
2017	Log Jammers	Nintendo Entertainment System, Windows	Mega Cat Studios
2017	Justice Duel	Nintendo Entertainment System	Mega Cat Studios
2017	Mega Marble World	Sega Genesis	Mega Cat Studios
2018	Little Medusa	Nintendo Entertainment System, Super Nintendo Entertainment System, Sega Genesis	Mega Cat Studios
2018	Creepy Brawlers	Nintendo Entertainment System	Mega Cat Studios
2018	Creeping it Real	Nintendo Entertainment System	Mega Cat Studios
2018	Sitten Kitten	Nintendo Entertainment System	Mega Cat Studios
2018	Expedition	Nintendo Entertainment System	Mega Cat Studios
2018	Fork Parker's Crunch Out	Super Nintendo Entertainment System	Mega Cat Studios, Devolver Digital
2019	Tänzer	Sega Genesis	Mikael Tillander
2019	Lucky Penguin	Nintendo Entertainment System	Lukasz Kur and Marcelo Barbosa
2019	Old Towers	Super Nintendo Entertainment System, Sega Genesis	Mega Cat Studios, Retrosouls
2019	Multidude	Nintendo Entertainment System	Retrosouls
2019	Super Painter	Nintendo Entertainment System	Retrosouls
2019	Machine Cave	Nintendo Entertainment System	Aeromangus
2019	Phantom Gear	Sega Genesis	Bits Rule Games
2019	Billionaire Banshee	Nintendo Entertainment System	Breaking Games
2020	Bite the Bullet	Windows, PlayStation 4, Xbox One, Nintendo Switch	Mega Cat Studios
2020	Lethal Wedding	Sega Genesis, Nintendo Switch	Mega Cat Studios
2020	Devwill Too MD	Sega Genesis	Manjana Team
2020	Arkagis Revolution	Sega Genesis	Sik
2020	Misplaced	Sega Genesis	Retrosouls
2020	Yazzie	Sega Genesis	Retrosouls
2020	GLUF	Sega Genesis	Retrosouls
2020	Another Reigny Day	Windows	Mega Cat Studios
2020	Alpha King	Windows	Mega Cat Studios
2020	The Meating	Nintendo Entertainment System	Mega Cat Studios
2020	Romeow & Julicat	Sega Genesis	Mega Cat Studios
2023	Renfield: Bring Your Own Blood	Windows	Mega Cat Studios
2023	WrestleQuest	Windows	Mega Cat Studios, Skybound Games
2024	Five Nights at Freddy's: Into the Pit	Windows, Nintendo Switch, PlayStation 4, PlayStation 5, Xbox One, Xbox Series X/S	Mega Cat Studios
2024	Backyard Baseball '97	Windows, iOS, Android, Nintendo Switch, PlayStation 5	Mega Cat Studios, Humongous Entertainment (Note: Original developer; Humongous's original credits were removed due to the defunct developer's brand being currently owned by Tommo, although the studio is mentioned in a special thanks message at the end of the remasters' credits.)
2024	Backyard Soccer '98	Windows, iOS, Android	Mega Cat Studios, Humongous Entertainment
2025	Backyard Baseball '01	Windows, iOS, Android	Mega Cat Studios, Humongous Entertainment
2025	Backyard Football '99	Windows, iOS, Android	Mega Cat Studios, Humongous Entertainment
2025	Angry Video Game Nerd 8-bit	Nintendo Entertainment System, Nintendo Switch, PlayStation 4, Xbox One, Windows	Mega Cat Studios
2025	Backyard Basketball '01	Windows, iOS, Android	Mega Cat Studios, Humongous Entertainment
2025	Backyard Hockey '02	Windows	Mega Cat Studios, Humongous Entertainment
2026	God of War Sons of Sparta	PlayStation 5, PlayStation 4	Mega Cat Studios, Santa Monica Studio
2026	Backyard Baseball	Windows, macOS, PlayStation 5, Nintendo Switch, Xbox Series X/S	Mega Cat Studios
TBA	FNaF World Sequel	Unknown	Mega Cat Studios
