= MLB Slugfest =

MLB Slugfest is a series of arcade-style baseball video games published by Midway Games. Entries in the series consist of:

- MLB Slugfest 2003
- MLB Slugfest 2004
- MLB Slugfest: Loaded
- MLB Slugfest 2006
