= Backyard Basketball =

Video game series

- Genre: Sports
- Developers: Humongous Entertainment (2001–2003); SolWorks (Basketball 2004 for PlayStation 2); Mistic Software (portable versions of Basketball 2004 and NBA Basketball 2007); Game Brains (PS2 and Windows versions of NBA Basketball 2007); Day 6 Sports Group (NBA Basketball 2015); Mega Cat Studios (Basketball '01; 2025 remaster of 2001 game)
- Publishers: Infogrames/Atari (2001–2006); Fingerprint Network (NBA Basketball 2015); Playground Productions (2025)
- Platforms: Android, Game Boy Advance, iOS, Macintosh, Nintendo DS, PlayStation 2, Windows
- First release: Backyard Basketball; October 30, 2001
- Latest release: Backyard Basketball '01; November 13, 2025
- Parent series: Backyard Sports

Backyard Basketball is a series of basketball video games made for children created by Humongous Entertainment. It is the fourth of five sub-series in the Backyard Sports video game franchise. The first game was developed by Humongous and published by Infogrames for Microsoft Windows and Mac in 2001. Additional games have been released on a variety of consoles, each with different characters and slightly altered gameplay mechanics.

As with the other Backyard Sports games, Backyard Basketball includes professional players as playable characters. The first incarnation included Kevin Garnett and Lisa Leslie.

== Gameplay ==
Backyard Basketball
- Developers: Humongous Entertainment (original); Mega Cat Studios (remaster)
- Publishers: Infogrames; Playground Productions (remaster)
- Series: Backyard Sports
- Engine: SCUMM
- Platforms: Windows, Mac
- Release: Original (Windows, Mac): NA: October 30, 2001; '01 remaster (Windows): WW: November 13, 2025
- Genre: Sports
- Modes: Single-player, multiplayer

Backyard Basketball has two primary modes of gameplay: Single Game, which allows the player to select a team to compete against a computer-controlled team, and Season Play, which allows the player to select a team to compete against a series of computer-controlled teams over an 18-game season, including two best-of-three playoff series and a best-of-five championship series should the player achieve a large number of victories. The Single Game mode also allows the player to compete against a second player or to practice using a single character.

Before games can occur, the player has the option to modify a variety of settings. These include court selection, A.I. difficulty (easy, medium, or hard), the presence of certain rules (fouls, fatigue, violations, shot control, and power-ups), sound options (game music, background sounds, and in-game dialogue), controls, and team names. Team modification also involves the customization of jerseys.

The game's controls are set to mouse usage by default, capitalizing on a point & click style of gameplay to move characters around. The game is also compatible with keyboards and game pads.

The selection of team members follows one of two settings: First Five Picks, which allows each player to select their team members freely, or Full Draft, which forces each player to select their team members one at a time in an alternating fashion. Each potential team member, including younger versions of Kevin Garnett and Lisa Leslie, is ranked according to five statistics operating on a 1 to 10 scale. These include Inside Shooting (the relative accuracy of the character's shot from inside the three-point line), Outside Shooting (the relative accuracy of the character's shot from beyond the three-point line), Ballhandling (the relative likelihood that the character will not have the ball stolen or blocked on offense), Defense (the relative likelihood that the character will be able to steal or block the ball on defense), and Quickness (the relative speed at which the character moves along the court). Players also have the option to customize rookie characters with either manually chosen or randomly allocated statistics, as well as heights, skin tones, shooting hands, birthdays, and names. Although rookie characters generally have lower overall statistics compared to pre-rendered players, they have the additional ability to increase all of their statistics by three levels should the player's team make the playoffs in Season Play.

Gameplay in Backyard Basketball is set to a point & click control scheme by default. With three characters on the court at one time, the player clicks at various locations on the court to guide the character with the ball to that location. Clicking on a teammate causes the character to pass the ball to that teammate while clicking the basket (indicated by a basketball icon) causes the character to attempt a shot. If shot control is on, then players have the option to make the shooting character pump fake by clicking rapidly, finally shooting the ball when the click is held down. If shot control is off, then the character will automatically release the shot once the basketball icon is clicked. On defense, the player can switch between characters to control by clicking on them as they run about, guiding the chosen character by clicking the location on the court where he or she should go. If an opposing character is clicked when an 'X' symbol hovers by them, the character nearest him or her will attempt to steal the ball. If a pair of hands appears near the basket when an opposing character goes to shoot the ball, the nearest character will attempt to block the shot or rebound the ball.

Backyard Basketball 2004
- North American PS2 cover art with a kid version of Tim Duncan along with his real-life adult counterpart.
- Developers: Humongous Entertainment (Windows); SolWorks (PS2); Mistic Software (GBA)
- Publisher: Atari
- Series: Backyard Sports
- Engine: Yaga
- Platforms: Windows, PlayStation 2, Game Boy Advance
- Release: Windows: NA: September 4, 2003; PS2: NA: October 21, 2003; EU: November 19, 2004; Game Boy Advance: NA: September 22, 2004
- Genre: Sports
- Modes: Single-player, multiplayer

Each quarter of a game lasts approximately three minutes while each overtime period (if necessary) lasts approximately one minute. The longer characters play without rest, the more tired and prone to mistakes (poor shooting and ball-handling) they will be as such, substitutions can be made after any completed play or during a time-out. Characters will recover their energy while on the bench (only two players can stay on the bench at a time). Granted, a character's energy will never decrease if the fatigue option is turned off.

Over the course of a game, power-ups may occasionally be rewarded to teams. The majority of these power-ups are useful, such as the flaming ball (which guarantees that the next attempted shot will go in), the tornado (which increases the speed of all characters on the court), the doughnut (which causes the next character who attempts a shot to automatically attempt a slam dunk), and 110% Juice (which provides energy to otherwise tired players if the fatigue option is turned on). Some power-ups, however, provide detrimental effects, such as the icy ball (which makes shots more likely to miss), the stick of butter (which reduces the team's ball-handling abilities), and the ice cream truck (which prevents the entire team from moving for a brief period of time).

== Releases ==
A month before the release of Backyard Baseball, Humongous Entertainment announced Backyard Soccer and Backyard Basketball as follow-up games, with the latter being planned for release in 1999. Backyard Football was released in 1999, while Backyard Basketball was delayed. The game was eventually released for Windows and Macintosh two years later in 2001, featuring Kevin Garnett as the game's primary mascot, and Lisa Leslie.

A second Backyard Basketball installment entitled Backyard Basketball 2004 was released in 2003 for Windows and PlayStation 2 and in 2004 for Game Boy Advance, featuring Tim Duncan as its primary mascot. The PlayStation 2 version was released in Europe under the name of Junior Sports Basketball, although it lacked any license from the NBA, and the Backyard Kids were redubbed with British voice actors.

A third Backyard Basketball installment with the title Backyard Sports: NBA Basketball 2007 was released for Game Boy Advance in 2006 and for Windows, PlayStation 2, and Nintendo DS in 2007, featuring Paul Pierce as its primary mascot. A planned release for the GameCube was cancelled.

A fourth installment entitled Backyard Sports: NBA Basketball 2015 was released in early 2015 for mobile devices, featuring Stephen Curry as its primary mascot.

A remastered version of the original Backyard Basketball installment under the title Backyard Basketball '01 was released on Steam on November 13, 2025.

Backyard Sports: NBA Basketball 2007
- Windows cover with Paul Pierce
- Developers: Game Brains (PS2, Windows); Mistic Software (GBA, DS)
- Publisher: Atari
- Series: Backyard Sports
- Platforms: Game Boy Advance, Windows, PlayStation 2, Nintendo DS
- Release: November 14, 2006: GBA; NA: November 14, 2006 Windows; NA: February 6, 2007 PS2; NA: February 13, 2007 DS; NA: September 25, 2007
- Genre: Sports
- Modes: Single-player, multiplayer

== Reception ==
In the United States, the debut version of Backyard Basketball sold 780,000 copies and earned $13.2 million by August 2006, after its release in October 2001. It was the country's 15th best-selling computer game between January 2000 and August 2006. Combined sales of all Backyard Sports games released between January 2000 and August 2006, including Backyard Basketball, had reached 5.3 million units in the United States by the latter date.

Backyard Basketball has received low to mixed reviews throughout its multiple releases. Ivan Sulic of IGN awarded the original version a score of 6.5 out of 10, complimenting the simplistic gameplay and colorful graphics while lamenting the amount of crashes that the game is susceptible to encountering. Chris Adams of IGN awarded the 2007 Nintendo DS version the same score, commenting that the addition of new gameplay modes offered more variety.
