= Indie Megabooth =

The Indie Megabooth is a section at game expositions, legally incorporated under the name Indie Megacorp, Corp, dedicated to the display and promotion of indie games. It launched at PAX East 2012 and continued to only appear at PAX events before expanding to other shows including the Eurogamer Expo, Electronic Entertainment Expo, Game Developers Conference, and Gamescom. It was founded by Kelly Wallick, who became the booth's full-time organizer in 2013.

After a brief hiatus during the COVID-19 pandemic, the Indie Megabooth organizers announced their return in 2023. As of 2024, the Indie Megabooth has not announced what their next event will be.

According to scholars, the Indie Megabooth has helped to shape video game culture and the industry as a cultural intermediary.

== History ==
The first Indie Megabooth took place at PAX East in 2012 with 16 developers and 20 games. That same year, at PAX Prime (now known as PAX West), it held 30 developers and 30 games. In 2013, its PAX East showing included 50 developers with 62 games. In only a year, it had more than doubled in size.

Between PAX East 2013 and PAX Prime 2013, the Indie Megabooth organization legally incorporated under the name Indie Megacorp, Corp. Kelly Wallick left her career as a project manager with Infrared5 to become acting president, secretary, treasurer, and only full-time employee. Eitan Glinert became the vice-president.

2014 marked the first time the Megabooth took place at a non-PAX event. It showed 15 games at the Game Developers Conference (GDC). At that time, organizers announced they would make a "concerted effort" to bring the Megabooth to many events moving forward.

True to their word, the Megabooth took place that same year at Gamescom for its first appearance overseas.

In 2015, the Indie Megabooth took place at the Eurogamer Expo. In 2017, it took part in the Electronic Entertainment Expo (E3).

The showings at Gamescom, Eurogamer, and E3 were all one-offs, but GDC—along with PAX West and PAX East—became a regular in their lineup.

In 2017, the Indie Megabooth created and held its own convention in Atlanta called the Indie Megashow. Along with showing indie video games, the convention included nine local musicians and four art installations from local artists.

By 2018, the Indie Megabooth received between 200 and 300 submissions for each event. The organizers would narrow that number down to between 60 and 80 games.

In 2020, the Indie Megabooth's organizers chose to "sunset" the Indie Megabooth for the duration of the COVID-19 pandemic.

In 2023, Wallick announced that the Indie Megabooth would be returning from its "hibernation." The announcement was a part of that year's Summer Game Fest during its Day of the Devs segment. No specific events were stated in its future plans.
