= Backyard Soccer MLS Edition =

2000 video game

- Original cover art featuring kid versions of Brandi Chastain and Cobi Jones (both foreground), and Backyard Sports character Reese Worthington (background).
- Developer: Humongous Entertainment
- Publisher: Infogrames
- Series: Backyard Sports
- Engine: SCUMM
- Platforms: Macintosh, Windows
- Release: October 3, 2000
- Genre: Sports
- Modes: Single-player, multiplayer

Backyard Soccer MLS Edition is a 2000 soccer video game developed by Humongous Entertainment and released on October 3, 2000, for Macintosh and Windows as part of the Backyard Sports series. It is the second game in the Backyard Soccer subseries and the fifth Backyard Sports title overall. Unlike the first Backyard Soccer, this game features Major League Soccer (MLS) teams and players, as well as three women from the United States women's national soccer team that won the 1999 FIFA Women's World Cup, making this the first time that female professional athletes were represented in the Backyard Sports series. Brandi Chastain and Cobi Jones both appear on the game's cover, redrawn as children.

A planned release for the Game Boy Color was cancelled. In 2003, a third Backyard Soccer title called Backyard Soccer 2004 was released.

== Gameplay ==
The gameplay of Backyard Soccer MLS Edition is mostly the same as the original Backyard Soccer game, with a few additional features. The biggest addition is the inclusion of 12 Major League Soccer players as children, which represent each of the 12 teams of the 2000 MLS season at the time, along with three USWNT players. Another new feature is a two-player mode on a single computer which allows players to control their respective teams with either the computer mouse, keyboard, or gamepads.

== Development ==
At the 1999 E3 event, Humongous Entertainment announced license deals with several professional sports leagues, including Major League Soccer. The following year, Backyard Soccer MLS Edition was formally announced with the reveal that it would be the first game to include female professional sports players as playable characters. To promote the game, Humongous Entertainment organized a sweepstakes with the top prize being a trip to Los Angeles and a meeting with Los Angeles Galaxy player Cobi Jones.

== Reception ==
The Dallas Daily News noted that the game only offered three female soccer stars to play as, but they appreciated the game's replay value. GameZone gave the game an overall score of 8 out of 10, praising its graphics, audio, and overall concept.
