= Backyard Hockey =

Video game series

- Genre: Sports
- Developers: Humongous Entertainment; Mistic Software; Mega Cat Studios
- Publishers: Infogrames/Atari (2002–2007); Playground Productions (2025)
- Platforms: Nintendo DS, Microsoft Windows, Game Boy Advance
- First release: Backyard Hockey; October 16, 2002
- Latest release: Backyard Hockey '02; November 13, 2025
- Parent series: Backyard Sports

Backyard Hockey is an ice hockey video game series created by Humongous Entertainment that was published by Infogrames/Atari. It is the fifth and last introduced sub-series in the Backyard Sports franchise, although it is not last sport introduced to the franchise. A total of four Backyard Hockey games have been released; the original Backyard Hockey (2002), Backyard Hockey 2005 (2004), Backyard Hockey for Game Boy Advance (2003), and Backyard Hockey for Nintendo DS (2007).

The original and updated computer releases of Backyard Hockey were developed solely by Humongous Entertainment, but the two Hockey games for Nintendo handhelds were co-developed with Mistic Software. The fourth installment on Nintendo DS is regarded to be the first hockey video game released in North America for such platform.

A remastered version of the original Backyard Hockey entitled Backyard Hockey '02 was released on Steam on November 13, 2025; Mega Cat Studios is the remaster's developer, with Playground Productions as the publisher.

== Gameplay ==
In a similar fashion to other titles in the Backyard Sports series, players create their own teams choosing from 30 "Backyard Kids" who each have their own unique strengths and weaknesses. Players can also create a custom player to play with and/or choose from several National Hockey League hockey players as children, some of these players are Steve Yzerman, Mike Modano, Joe Sakic, Jaromír Jágr, Jarome Iginla, Martin Brodeur, and Curtis Joseph.

In the game players control their character in a game of ice hockey. At random times during a game, power ups appear at center ice. Power ups provide help to the team that secures them such as causing all the players on the opposing team to fall over, or super speed. Unique from most ice hockey games, fighting is not allowed in Backyard Hockey (instead being replaced by rock-paper-scissors with the loser going to the penalty box) and a few penalties are called.

== Installments ==
Title	Release date	Developer	Publisher	Platforms
Backyard Hockey	October 16, 2002	Humongous Entertainment	Infogrames	Microsoft Windows
Backyard Hockey	October 7, 2003	Mistic Software	Atari	Game Boy Advance
Backyard Hockey 2005	September 23, 2004	Humongous Entertainment	Atari	Microsoft Windows
Backyard Hockey	October 9, 2007	Mistic Software	Atari	Nintendo DS
Backyard Hockey '02	November 13, 2025	Mega Cat Studios	Playground Productions	Microsoft Windows
