= Log Jammers =

2017 video game

- Box art
- Developer: Mega Cat Studios
- Publisher: Mega Cat Studios
- Director: James Deighan
- Producer: Nick Mann
- Designer: Nate Flynn
- Composer: Mitch Foster
- Engine: Unity
- Platforms: Microsoft Windows; Xbox One; PlayStation 4; Nintendo Switch; Nintendo Entertainment System
- Release: 2017
- Genre: Sports
- Modes: Single-player, multiplayer

Log Jammers is a sports video game published and developed by Mega Cat Studios. It was released on the Nintendo Entertainment System and is scheduled to be released for Microsoft Windows, PlayStation 4, Nintendo Switch, and Xbox One in 2020. The game features a lumberjack theme, silly humor, and fast-paced action in the style of arcade games. The objective of the game is to toss an axe past the opponent and into their goal. The game's name is an allusion to Windjammers, which the developers cite as an inspiration. It also refers to a log jam, which relates to the games lumberjack theme, as well as the aquatic, log-based levels.

== Gameplay ==
There are eight playable characters in Log Jammers, each with their own unique special ability, attributes, and story. After selecting a character and mode, players throw an axe back and forth, attempting to get it behind their opponent into their goal, while also protecting their own goal. An axe that lands in the middle portion of the goal is worth two points, while one that lands in either corner is worth five. The round ends when a player's score passes ten points. Power-ups granting various temporary abilities (like the oil can, which greases your opponent and makes them unable to catch the axe) float down the middle of the screen at regular intervals.

After beating the game's tournament mode, players unlock a brief vignette revealing the outcome of their character's story.

== Development ==
Development of the NES version of Log Jammers began in 2017. A Kickstarter campaign for the game's modern console versions was launched in September 2018.

== Reception ==
Log Jammers received a positive reception from the press; critics praised the game for its art style while voicing concern that the game itself may be "too chaotic".

=== Accolades ===
Log Jammers won the awards for Best Gameplay and Game of the Year at Gameacon 2017, and was selected as a Game of the Year finalist for the 2017 Indie Prize USA.
