= Backyard Soccer =

1998 video game

- Cover art for the original PC release as taken from the game's AutoRun menu. Depicted are Ricky Johnson (left) and Gretchen Hasselhoff, two of the "Backyard Kids".
- Developer: Humongous Entertainment (Note: Ported to the PlayStation by Runecraft.) (Note: The remastered version (Backyard Soccer '98) was developed by Mega Cat Studios.)
- Publisher: Humongous Entertainment (Note: The PlayStation version was published by Infogrames.) (Note: The remastered version (Backyard Soccer '98) was published by Playground Productions.)
- Series: Backyard Sports
- Engine: SCUMM
- Platforms: Windows, Macintosh, PlayStation, iOS
- Release: Windows, Macintosh: NA: October 13, 1998; EU: 1999; PlayStation: NA: September 28, 2001; EU: November 2, 2001; iOS: NA: October 31, 2008; '98 remaster (Windows): WW: November 27, 2024; '98 remaster (iOS, Android): WW: November 13, 2025
- Genre: Sports
- Modes: Single-player, multiplayer

Backyard Soccer, known in Europe as Backyard Football (PC) or Junior Sports Football (PlayStation) and in Australia as Junior Sports Soccer, is a children's association football video game developed and published by Humongous Entertainment; Infogrames published the PlayStation version. It is the second game in the Backyard Sports series, following Backyard Baseball, and the first installment of the Backyard Soccer sub-series. It was first released on October 13, 1998, for Macintosh and Microsoft Windows, in 2001 for the PlayStation, and in 2008 for iOS. The PC and PlayStation versions of the game, alongside the PlayStation 2 version of Backyard Basketball, were the only Backyard Sports titles released in Europe.

The game spawned two sequels, both of which would include players from Major League Soccer and the USWNT; the sequels were Backyard Soccer MLS Edition, released in 2000 and Backyard Soccer 2004, released in 2003.

A remastered version of the game entitled Backyard Soccer '98 was released for Windows via Steam on November 27, 2024, becoming the second remaster in the Backyard Sports franchise after its 2024 reboot, following Backyard Baseball '97 the previous month and preceding four more remasters. A mobile port for the remaster was released on November 13, 2025.

== Gameplay ==
Backyard Soccer is a 6-a-side soccer video game with hybrid youth and professional soccer rules. The game has five modes: "Pick-Up Game", "Friendly Match", "Practice Penalty Kicks", "Spectator" and "League Play". The PlayStation version also includes two additional modes: "Mini-League" and "Beach Tournament".

In league play, the player takes a managerial role by selecting 8 players from a group of 30 Backyard Kids. The team enters the "Backyard Soccer League", aiming to win promotion from the B Division to the A and then Premier Division. If in the top four by mid-season in any division, the player's team will be invited to the Off-The-Wall Indoor Invitational, an indoor soccer tournament. After winning the Premier Division, the player's team will be invited to represent the United States in the Astonishingly Shiny Cup of All Cups Tournament (a spoof of the FIFA World Cup). Regardless of the tournament's outcome, the player's team will be placed back in the Premier Division for another chance at the Cup.

== Reception ==
Reception

Review scores
Publication	Score
AllGame	3/5 (PC); 3/5 (PS)
GameZone	8/10 (PC); 7.5/10 (PS)
PlayStation: The Official Magazine	2/10

Backyard Soccer received moderate reviews. Its gameplay was criticized for the hard-to-use controls for the PC version and long loading time, while its graphics were praised on all platforms. Brad Cook of Allgame was critical to the controls for the PC version. PSX Nation gave the game a score of 49 out of 100.

=== 2024 remaster ===
Reviews of the 2024 remaster have been positive. Mark O'Callaghan of CBR, in particular, praised the remaster for retaining all of the original game's features as well as the addition of achievements, but he expressed concern that players who were unfamiliar with soccer may lose interest due to the game's lack of a proper tutorial.
