= Backyard Baseball =

Video game series

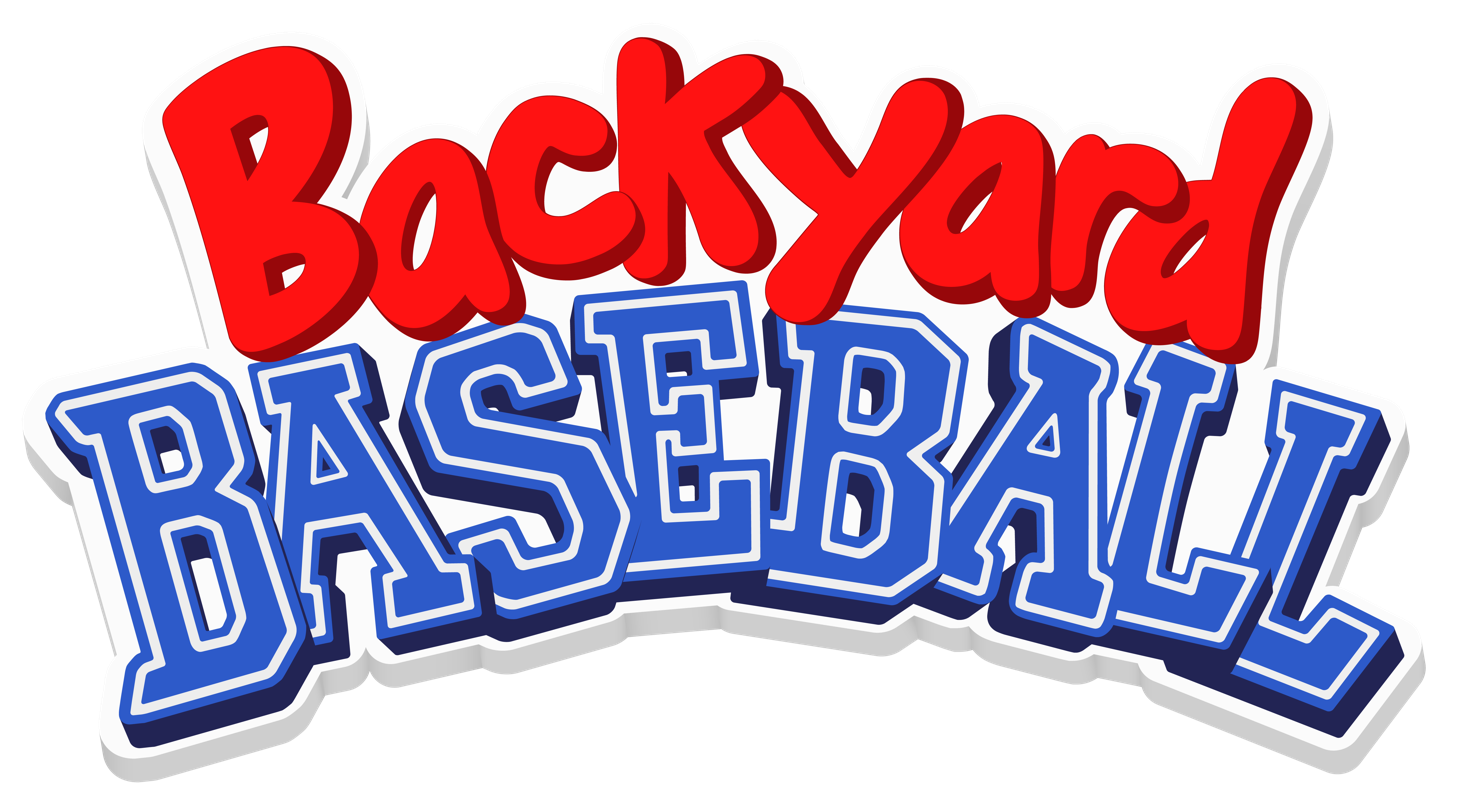
- The logo of Backyard Baseball (2026), a recreation of the logo of the original Backyard Baseball (1997)
- Genre: Sports
- Developers: Humongous Entertainment; Mega Cat Studios
- Publishers: Humongous Entertainment; Infogrames/Atari; The Evergreen Group; Playground Productions
- Platforms: Nintendo DS, PlayStation 2, Wii, Windows, iOS, Xbox 360, Game Boy Advance, GameCube, Macintosh, Nintendo Switch, PlayStation 5
- First release: Backyard Baseball; October 10, 1997
- Latest release: Backyard Baseball; July 9, 2026
- Parent series: Backyard Sports

Backyard Baseball is a series of baseball video games for children which was originally developed by Humongous Entertainment. It was first released in October 1997 for Macintosh and Microsoft Windows. Later games were featured on Game Boy Advance, PlayStation 2, GameCube, Wii, and iOS. It is part of the Backyard Sports franchise, of which this series serves as its first sub-series. It, along with its parent franchise, is currently handled by Playground Productions and developed by Mega Cat Studios.

After its debut entry in 1997, the series ran regularly with new installments released on a yearly basis from 2000 to 2010, with the exceptions of 2001 and 2007. The series, along with the rest of the Backyard Sports franchise, went on hiatus from 2011 until 2024, save for the release of the 2015 mobile game Backyard Sports: Baseball 2015. The 2024 reboot of the series began with a remastered release of the first game on Windows (via Steam) on October 10, 2024, with ports for iOS, Android, Nintendo Switch, and PlayStation 5 and a remaster of Backyard Baseball 2001 (2000) for Windows, iOS, and Android released the following year. A new Backyard Baseball game was released in 2026.

== Overview ==
In Backyard Baseball, players take a managerial role by creating a team of different players to compete against opponents. The original game consisted of 30 neighborhood children from which the player must build a team. Beginning from Backyard Baseball 2001, however, the games have additionally featured Major League Baseball players reimagined as children, with the exception of Backyard Sports: Sandlot Sluggers (2010). MLB licensing is also present in all but three games in the series; the original 1997 game, Sandlot Sluggers, and the 2026 reboot game.

In the different installments, one could choose to play a one-off exhibition game or a seasonal league, followed by the "Backyard Baseball League" playoffs, which differ depending on whether MLB licensing is present. In the 1997 and 2026 games, the top two (out of eight) teams of the season compete against one another in the All-City Playoffs. The winner of that series then competes against another team in the Super Entire Nation Tournament, with the two other teams competing in their own series in the same tournament. Finally, the two winning teams of the Super Entire Nation Tournament compete against each other in the Ultra Grand Championship of the Universe. In the MLB-licensed games, these are replaced with a Backyard Baseball League version of the six MLB divisions and the MLB postseason, the latter of which contains the American League and National League Division Series, the AL and NL championship series, and finally the "Backyard Baseball World Series". Series games will vary per game.

This game has various playable modes, and they include: Single Game, Batting Practice, Spectator, and Season Game.

== Legacy ==
Pablo Sanchez, one of the fictional playable characters in the game, has been regarded as one of the strongest athletes in video game history.

The game has also been noted for its diversity (gender, race, disability, etc.) of characters, both in ratio of white to non-white and male to female, as well as skill level and the distribution of the best characters.

=== Players ===
In Backyard Baseball 2001, in addition to the 30 fictional kids, each team was represented by at least one MLB pro player, (Note: The Cincinnati Reds were represented by two players: Barry Larkin and Ken Griffey Jr.) many of which were all-stars during the 1999 Major League Baseball All Star Game. Eventual Hall of Fame players featured include Barry Larkin, Vladimir Guerrero, Jeff Bagwell, Larry Walker, Chipper Jones, Derek Jeter, Mike Piazza, Tony Gwynn, Ken Griffey Jr., Cal Ripken Jr., Ivan Rodriguez, and Randy Johnson, who are all playable characters to choose from.

Other professional players from the later games included Chipper Jones, Frank Thomas, Alex Rodriguez, Alfonso Soriano, Ichiro Suzuki, Sammy Sosa, Jim Thome, Albert Pujols, Nomar Garciaparra, Ken Griffey Jr., and Barry Bonds.

Several of these players would be featured in multiple releases including Nomar Garciaparra, Derek Jeter, and Alex Rodriguez.

== Installments ==
Release timeline
1997	Backyard Baseball
1998–1999
2000	Backyard Baseball 2001
2001
2002	Backyard Baseball (GBA)
2002	Backyard Baseball 2003
2003	Backyard Baseball (GCN)
2004	Backyard Baseball (PS2)
2004	Backyard Baseball 2005 (PC)
2005	Backyard Baseball 2006 (GBA)
2006	Backyard Sports: Baseball 2007
2007
2008	Backyard Baseball 09
2009	Backyard Baseball 10
2010	Backyard Sports: Sandlot Sluggers
2011–2014
2015	Backyard Sports: Baseball 2015 (Mobile)
2016–2023
2024	Backyard Baseball '97 (PC)
2025	Backyard Baseball '97 (Mobile)
2025	Backyard Baseball '97 (NS)
2025	Backyard Baseball '97 (PS5)
2025	Backyard Baseball '01
2026	Backyard Baseball

Title	Release date/year	Platforms	Cover athlete (and athlete's MLB team)
Backyard Baseball	October 10, 1997	Macintosh, Windows	Original characters
Backyard Baseball 2001	June 6, 2000	Macintosh, Windows	Cal Ripken Jr. (Baltimore Orioles)
Backyard Baseball	2002	Game Boy Advance	Mike Piazza (New York Mets)
Backyard Baseball 2003	2002	Macintosh, Windows	Mike Piazza (New York Mets)
Backyard Baseball	April 10, 2003	GameCube	Alex Rodriguez (Texas Rangers in GameCube game, New York Yankees in others)
Backyard Baseball	March 24, 2004	PlayStation 2	Alex Rodriguez (Texas Rangers in GameCube game, New York Yankees in others)
Backyard Baseball 2005	March 24, 2004	Windows	Alex Rodriguez (Texas Rangers in GameCube game, New York Yankees in others)
Backyard Baseball 2006	March 16, 2005	Game Boy Advance	Alex Rodriguez (Texas Rangers in GameCube game, New York Yankees in others)
Backyard Sports: Baseball 2007	2006	Game Boy Advance, GameCube, PlayStation 2, Windows	Albert Pujols (St. Louis Cardinals)
Backyard Baseball '09	March 25, 2008 (NDS, Win); June 10, 2008 (PS2, Wii)	Nintendo DS, Windows, Wii, PlayStation 2	David Ortiz (Boston Red Sox)
Backyard Baseball '10	March 27, 2009 (NDS, Wii); April 28, 2009 (PS2)	Nintendo DS, Wii, PlayStation 2	David Ortiz (Boston Red Sox)
Backyard Sports: Sandlot Sluggers	2010	Wii, Nintendo DS, Xbox 360, Windows	Original characters
Backyard Sports: Baseball 2015	2015	iOS, Android	Original characters
Backyard Baseball '97	October 10, 2024 (Win); March 27, 2025 (iOS, Android); June 12, 2025 (NS, PS5)	Windows, iOS, Android, Nintendo Switch, PlayStation 5	Original characters
Backyard Baseball '01	July 8, 2025	Windows, iOS, Android	Cal Ripken Jr. (Baltimore Orioles)
Backyard Baseball	July 9, 2026 (Win, Mac); TBA (PS5, XSX, NS)	Windows, macOS, Nintendo Switch, PlayStation 5, Xbox Series X and Series S	Original characters

== Animated special ==
On January 29, 2026, an 11-minute animated special entitled Backyard Sports: The Animated Special was released on YouTube. It was sponsored by Dave & Buster's and starred the voices of Ego Nwodim, Tiffany Haddish, Adam Pally, Utkarsh Ambudkar, and Arturo Castro.
