= Backyard Football =

Children's American football video game series

- The logo of Backyard Football '99 (2025), a remaster of the original Backyard Football (1999)
- Genre: Sports
- Developers: Humongous Entertainment; Left Field Productions (Backyard Football for GameCube); Mega Cat Studios (reboot)
- Publishers: Humongous Entertainment; Infogrames/Atari; The Evergreen Group; Playground Productions (reboot)
- Platforms: Nintendo DS, PlayStation 2, Wii, Windows, Xbox 360, Game Boy Advance, Mac, GameCube
- First release: Backyard Football; October 28, 1999
- Latest release: Backyard Football '99; September 9, 2025
- Parent series: Backyard Sports

Backyard Football is a series of video games for various systems. The series was developed by Humongous Entertainment and published by Infogrames, Atari, Inc., and The Evergreen Group. It is third of five sub-series in the Backyard Sports franchise and is the first to feature professional players as kids, examples being Steve Young and Barry Sanders, as well as the license of a professional sports league, in this case the NFL. The series currently has twelve titles, including one remaster.

Backyard Football attempts to recreate the experience of playing American football as children.

== Titles ==
Title	Year	Platforms	Cover athlete
Backyard Football	October 28, 1999	Macintosh, Microsoft Windows	Steve Young
Backyard Football 2002	2001	Macintosh, Windows	Drew Bledsoe, Donovan McNabb
Backyard Football	2002	Game Boy Advance	Donovan McNabb
Backyard Football	2002	GameCube	Donovan McNabb
Backyard Football 2004	2003	Windows	Jeff Garcia
Backyard Football 2006	2005	Game Boy Advance, PlayStation 2, Windows	Daunte Culpepper
Backyard Sports Football 2007	2006	Game Boy Advance	Ben Roethlisberger
Backyard Football '08	2007	Nintendo DS, PlayStation 2, Wii, Windows	Tom Brady
Backyard Football '09	2008	Nintendo DS, PlayStation 2, Wii, Windows	Tom Brady
Backyard Football '10	2009	PlayStation 2, Wii, Xbox 360	Frank Gore, Eli Manning, Kurt Warner, Peyton Manning, Adrian Peterson, Jason Witten
Backyard Sports: Rookie Rush	2010	Nintendo DS, Wii, Xbox 360	Multiple fictional players
Backyard Football '99	September 9, 2025	Windows	Multiple fictional players

=== Backyard Football ===
Backyard Football, the third Backyard Sports game, was developed by Humongous Entertainment and published by GT Interactive in 1999. It is the first game in the franchise to include child versions of NFL players as playable characters, featuring Jerry Rice, Brett Favre, Steve Young, Drew Bledsoe, Dan Marino, Barry Sanders, John Elway, and Randall Cunningham. There are three different gameplay modes available in Backyard Football. The first one is a single game. At the single game screen, the player can select the field on which they wish to play, the weather (between sunny, where the players are able to run very quickly; rainy, in which the players are slowed somewhat and the ball is difficult to throw; and snowy, where players are slowed considerably), and the level of difficulty (between easy, medium, and hard), among various other minor settings. They then pick their team's name, which can be any of the then-31 NFL teams and 10 backyard teams. When the team is chosen, a player would take turns choosing players with the CPU. There are a total of seven players on a team, two of which will be on the bench, while five get to see action. The statistics of a player in single game mode have no effect on a player's statistics in season play.

The second type of gameplay is season mode. The player selects their coach name, settings, and team before the season and drafts all seven of their players before the CPU picks any for the rest of the computer-controlled teams in the league. The coach guides their team through a 14-game season, at the end of which if they are to win their division or be picked as the wild card, the team will compete in the playoffs. Eight teams, four from each conference, compete in three rounds of games to determine the winner of the "Super Colossal Cereal Bowl" (which is a spoof of the Super Bowl in the NFL).

The third type of gameplay is online play. Backyard Football is the only game, along with Backyard Baseball 2001, that offers online play with players across the globe. Online play is hosted through the Junior Sports Network and is only available for Windows users, since the network system does not support Macintosh. Like Backyard Baseball 2001, there are three difficulty areas: Easy Streets, Mediumville, and Toughy Town. The harder the difficulty, it becomes less likely that the players out on the field are going to make magnificent plays to "bail the coach out". While playing online, the player may make contact with another coach online. They may then chat with each other with only pre-written dialogue, since the network is not being monitored to make sure no inappropriate language is used. Since www.jrsn.com has been discontinued, no new coach names may be registered to play online, but in 2021, a member named LittleToonCat has recreated the servers from scratch running on Node.js and using an online-enabled ScummVM build as the client to connect to the new servers which was released as Backyard Sports Online. The source codes for the server, session, and the ScummVM client have been made open source by the creator.

A remastered version of this game entitled Backyard Football '99 was released for Windows (via Steam), iOS, and Android on September 9, 2025. Mega Cat Studios is the remaster's developer, with Playground Productions as the publisher. The remaster notably does not have the NFL license, although all the professional players except for Brett Favre return; Favre is replaced by a new original character, Chase Downfield, the younger brother of the series' color commentator Chuck Downfield, in the remaster.

=== Backyard Football 2002 ===
Backyard Football 2002 was developed by Humongous Entertainment and published by Infogrames in 2001 for Windows and Macintosh; it was originally intended to be released exclusively on the Game Boy Color in 2000 under the title Backyard Football 2001. Brett Favre and Drew Bledsoe, who both appear in the first Backyard Football, return in this game, while Terrell Davis, Steve McNair, Jevon Kearse, Rich Gannon, Ricky Williams, Junior Seau, Donovan McNabb, and Cade McNown are added. This is also the only SCUMM game to use LAN play instead of online services. Versions for the Game Boy Advance and GameCube were released a year later.

=== Backyard Football 2004 ===
Backyard Football 2004 was developed by Humongous Entertainment and published by Atari in 2003 for Windows. Donovan McNabb returns in this game, while Mike Vick, Jeff Garcia, Marshall Faulk, Curtis Martin, Marvin Harrison, Brian Urlacher, Jerome Bettis, David Boston, and Zach Thomas are added.

=== Backyard Football 2006 ===
Backyard Football 2006 was developed by Humongous Entertainment and published by Atari in 2005 for Windows, PlayStation 2, and Game Boy Advance. Mike Vick, Donovan McNabb, Marvin Harrison, and Brian Urlacher return in this game, while Daunte Culpepper, Tom Brady, Matt Hasselbeck, Priest Holmes, LaDainian Tomlinson, Torry Holt, Peyton Manning, Michael Strahan, Tony Gonzalez, and Ahman Green are added. It is the first game in the series to feature a 7-on-7 lineup.

=== Backyard Sports Football 2007 ===
Backyard Sports Football 2007 was developed by Humongous Entertainment and published by Atari in 2006 for the Game Boy Advance. Backyard Sports Football 2007 received negative reviews, being criticized for its repetitive sound and poor gameplay. The sound was described as "annoying, repetitious music" by a reviewer at GameZone. The gameplay was described as poor by the same reviewer due to "irresponsive controls" and a lack of playbook options.

=== Backyard Football '08 ===
Reception

Aggregate score
Aggregator	Score
GameRankings	60% (Wii); 15% (DS)

Review score
Publication	Score
IGN	6/10 (Wii); 1.5/10 (DS)

Backyard Football '08 was released in 2007 for Windows (on October 9), Wii, PlayStation 2 (both platforms on October 16) and Nintendo DS (on October 23). Humongous Entertainment handled development, with assistance by FarSight Studios and Torus Games. It was published by Atari.

IGN rated the Wii version of the game a 6/10 and criticized it for having controls that may be hard for a younger audience to understand, while praising its commentary for being funny.

=== Backyard Football '09 ===
Reception

Aggregate score
Aggregator	Score
GameRankings	68% (Wii)

Review score
Publication	Score
GameZone	6.8/10 (Wii)

Backyard Football '09 was developed and published by the same studios as the previous installment and released on the same systems in 2008. The game includes all 22 backyard kids and 15 professional players as kids. Professional players include Tom Brady, Peyton Manning, Tony Romo, LaDainian Tomlinson, Brian Urlacher, Reggie Bush, Chris Cooley and Frank Gore and more. Along with the NFL players, most of the classic backyard kids are in the game including Pete Wheeler, Pablo Sanchez, and Ernie Steele. Both of the commentators, Chuck Downfield and Sunny Day, are also from previous games of the series.

Backyard Football '09 was said to be "repetitive with its commentary" and "made too simple and easy" from many reviews. The reviews state that the game targets more of a pre-teen audience.

=== Backyard Football '10 ===
Reception

Aggregate score
Aggregator	Score
GameRankings	57.50% (X360); 65% (Wii); 35% (PS2)

Review scores
Publication	Score
Official Xbox Magazine (US)	6/10
ZTGameDomain	6.5/10 (X360)

Backyard Football '10 was also developed by the previous team who did the other two installments and published by Atari in 2009 for the Xbox 360, Wii, and PlayStation 2. The game features "Single Player", "Season", "Tournament", and "All Pro" modes, along with the multiplayer modes of co-op play and two-on-two contests.

The game received mixed reviews for the Xbox 360 and Wii versions, but negative reviews for the PS2 version. For the Xbox 360 version, ZTGameDomain said that the game is "simple, easy to pick up and really well designed".

=== Backyard Sports: Rookie Rush ===
Backyard Sports: Rookie Rush was developed by HB Studios and published by Atari in 2010 for the Xbox 360, Wii, Microsoft Windows, and Nintendo DS. This title features the previously created "Pick-up Games", "Season Mode", and "Tournament", and introduces two new styles of gameplay, "Story Mode" and "Mini-Games".

Common Sense Media gave the game 4 out of 5 stars. The game received 2 out of 5 stars from AllGame.

== TV special ==
In 2002, a live-action animated TV special based on the Backyard Football series entitled NFL Backyard Basics: Football Tips from the Pros, featuring the then quarterback for the Philadelphia Eagles, Donovan McNabb, aired on CBS on November 16 and later reran on Nickelodeon Games and Sports for Kids.
