= Freddi Fish =

- Freddi Fish and Luther, as they appear in Freddi Fish and the Case of the Haunted Schoolhouse.
- Genres: Adventure, edutainment
- Developer: Humongous Entertainment
- Publishers: Humongous Entertainment; Atari; Infogrames; Ubisoft
- Creators: Ron Gilbert; Larry Kay; Tami Caryl Borowick
- Platforms: Windows, Macintosh, iOS, Android, Linux, Nintendo Switch, PlayStation 4
- First release: Freddi Fish and the Case of the Missing Kelp Seeds; 1994
- Latest release: Freddi Fish's Fun House; 2013

Freddi Fish is a series of point-and-click adventure games aimed towards children from Humongous Entertainment. The series began in 1994. Freddi Fish is an anthropomorphic yellow fish who takes on detective investigations throughout the series. Her best friend, a green fish named Luther, goes with her on all her adventures. The voice of Freddi Fish was performed by Annette Toutonghi and the voice of Luther was performed by Mike McAuliffe at Bad Animals Studio in Seattle, Washington. The series sold more than 2.6 million copies and won over 75 awards of excellence. In each game there are multiple different possible sets of quests one has to complete in order to complete the game, depending on the playthrough (randomness determines which set of quests the player is given).

== Gameplay ==
Freddi and Luther move from one area to another by clicking where the cursor turns into a 3-D arrow. In each area, there are places that the player can click that play an animation that is irrelevant to the plot, including crossover cameos of the other Humongous Entertainment games (Putt-Putt, Fatty Bear, Pajama Sam and Spy Fox), as well as important items to collect (including sea urchins that can be spent as money to buy other items) and non-playable characters to speak with. Some items or areas are inaccessible unless the impediment is removed by helping a NPC or obtaining another item needed to advance. All items collected are kept with Freddi and stored in an inventory for later use, and her ability to carry them all out of sight is left unexplained. The two fish usually journey together, but in rare instances throughout the series, they may be separated and the player takes control of Luther. In such sequences, items cannot be used until Luther reunites with Freddi. It is also possible to save a game in progress so that it can be continued later. Overall, Freddi Fish Junior Adventures are mainly about helping solve others' problems which are tied into a constantly progressing story line.

In all the Freddi Fish games, except the second game (Haunted Schoolhouse), the game is divided into two areas: a larger main game world where the player completes favors for NPCs and gathers and uses items to work towards solving the mystery in question, and a smaller endgame area that is a point of no return where Freddi and Luther lose most or all of their items and confront the main antagonists and finally solve the mystery. The third and fourth games end with a mystery to find out who was the thief. In the third game, they give one or two clues that point to the personality of one of several possible suspects determined at random; in the fourth game, a clue in the Hogfishes' room points to an object the suspect had been using.

== Games ==
=== Adventure games ===
- Freddi Fish and the Case of the Missing Kelp Seeds (1994)
  - Freddi Fish Kelp Seed Mystery (2008)
  - Freddi Fish and the Missing Kelp Seeds (2014)
- Freddi Fish 2: The Case of the Haunted Schoolhouse (1996)
  - Freddi Fish Haunted Schoolhouse Mystery (2011)
  - Freddi Fish: Haunted Schoolhouse (2014)
- Freddi Fish 3: The Case of the Stolen Conch Shell (1998)
  - Freddi Fish and the Stolen Shell (2011)
  - Freddi Fish & the Stolen Shell (2014)
- Freddi Fish 4: The Case of the Hogfish Rustlers of Briny Gulch (1999)
- Freddi Fish 5: The Case of the Creature of Coral Cove (2001)

=== Other games ===
"Junior Arcade" puzzle games
Game	Releases	Developer/Publisher	Notes
Freddi Fish and Luther's Maze Madness	Windows, Macintosh: February 24, 1997; iOS: September 2, 2013; Android: April 1, 2014; Linux: April 17, 2014		
Freddi Fish and Luther's Water Worries	Windows, Macintosh: February 24, 1997; Linux: May 1, 2014		
Freddi Fish Jellyfish Jamboree	Handheld LCD: 1999	Humongous Entertainment	Based on the minigame of the same name in Freddi Fish and the Case of the Missing Kelp Seeds.
Activity programs
Game	Releases	Developer/Publisher	Notes
Freddi Fish's One-Stop Fun Shop	Windows, Macintosh: July 27, 2000	Humongous Entertainment, Infogrames	Gained Award of Excellence from Review Corner.
Freddi Fish And Friends: ABC Under The Sea	Nintendo DS: October 5, 2010	1st Playable Productions	A compilation of educational minigames involving characters and locations from the Freddi Fish series. Despite the game's subtitle, some minigames address other subjects besides spelling and the alphabet.
Freddi Fish's Fun House	iOS, Android: July 17, 2013	Nimbus Games	

== Availability ==
- For Steam the games were released as single games, or bundled with the other Freddi Fish games in "Freddi Fish Complete Pack" or packaged with all Humongous Entertainment games in "Humongous Entertainment Complete Pack".
- Infogrames released a CD titled "Freddi Fish / Pajama Sam Value 2-Pack" containing Freddi Fish and the Case of the Missing Kelp Seeds and Pajama Sam: No Need to Hide When It's Dark Outside.
- Humongous Entertainment released a CD titled "Freddi Fish Deluxe Pack", which included Freddi Fish 3: The Case of the Stolen Conch Shell and Freddi Fish and Luther's Maze Madness.
- Infogrames released a CD titled "Freddi Fish 3-Pack" with Freddi Fish 3: The Case of the Stolen Conch Shell, Freddi Fish and Luther's Water Worries and Freddi Fish's One-Stop Fun Shop included.
- Humongous Entertainment released a "Freddi Fish Fun & Learning 1st Grade Edition" package with a Freddi Fish notebook and a CD that included Freddi Fish 2: The Case of the Haunted Schoolhouse and Big Thinkers First Grade.
- Freddi Fish and the Case of the Missing Kelp Seeds was included in the "Kids' BackPack IV" CD along with Math Blaster Episode I: In Search of Spot, Pajama Sam: No Need to Hide When It's Dark Outside, Just Me and My Mom and Muppet Treasure Island.
- Freddi Fish 2: The Case of the Haunted Schoolhouse was included in the "Favorite Friends 4-Game Collectors Pack" CD along with Blue's 123 Time Activities, Tonka Construction 2 and Candy Land Adventure.
- Humongous Entertainment released a CD titled "Humongous Entertainment Triple Treat", which included Freddi Fish and the Case of the Missing Kelp Seeds, Pajama Sam's Sock Works and Putt-Putt Saves the Zoo.
- Humongous Entertainment released a CD titled "Humongous Entertainment Triple Treat 2", which included Freddi Fish and Luther's Maze Madness, Pajama Sam: No Need to Hide When It's Dark Outside and Putt-Putt Travels Through Time.
- Humongous Entertainment released a CD titled "Humongous Entertainment Triple Treat 3", which included Freddi Fish 2: The Case of the Haunted Schoolhouse, Spy Fox in: Cheese Chase and Backyard Baseball.
- Freddi Fish and Luther's Water Worries was released for Windows and Macintosh on a compilation CD titled "Super Duper Arcade 1", along with Spy Fox in: Cheese Chase, Pajama Sam's Sock Works and Putt-Putt and Pep's Balloon-o-Rama.
- Freddi Fish and Luther's Maze Madness was released for Windows and Macintosh on a compilation CD titled "Super Duper Arcade 2", along with Spy Fox in: Hold the Mustard, Pajama Sam's Lost & Found and Putt-Putt and Pep's Dog on a Stick.
- A digital compilation of all five of the Junior Adventure games in the Freddi Fish series titled Freddi Fish Collection was released for Nintendo Switch and PlayStation 4.

== Characters ==
Freddi Fish takes place under the sea and features many anthropomorphic sea life, with the adult fish characters being highly anthropomorphized in that they float with their heads raised and tails pointing downward, atypical of real fish, and even wear human clothing.

=== Main characters ===
- Freddi Fish – a smart and courageous yellow fish with orange fins and blue eyes, she volunteers to investigate any mystery or crime that has recently affected her friends. She often counters the crooks she catches with morals of wrongdoings and has a desire to be a police officer when she reaches adulthood. She was voiced by Annette Toutonghi.
- Luther – a green fish with beige fins and black eyes, he is Freddi's best friend and sidekick. He is a guppy like Freddi and, while being a bit cowardly and greedy at times, he is very faithful to his friends and family and does care about others. He was voiced by Mike McAucliffe.

=== Recurring characters ===
- Boss & Spongehead – two thieving blue sharks who steal stuff specially for the Squidfather. As their names reflect, Boss is the shark that does the planning, and Spongehead is the shark that follows the instructions with some outcomes going wrong. They appear as the main antagonists in both "Missing Kelp Seeds" and "Haunted Schoolhouse".
- Catfish – a white fish with the head of a cat and green fins belonging to the Squidfather.
- Casey – a magenta fish shaped like Luther with the same-colored fins and the same eyebrows as Freddi (even though they are different genders). He wears glasses and enjoys science magazines and analyzing food samples.
- Eddie – a mean, green electric eel, who stands in other fishes' way and has a big appetite.
- Gill Barker – a turquoise-colored shark who acts as a traveling salesman and a carnival ringmaster. He is a suspect of the crime in both of his appearances. His sister, Gillian Barker, appears in "Creature of Coral Cove".
- Grandma Grouper – an elderly purple grouper who grows the kelp seeds. She is revealed to have a fortune telling machine in "Stolen Conch Shell".
- Ray – an aqua-coloured manta ray with a fancy for collecting pretty items of value and trading them for other objects.
- Sam – a pelican and close friend to Freddi and Luther.
- The Squidfather – a pink giant squid, who groans and mumbles when he talks. He is constantly grumpy and spends a lot of time stroking his pet white catfish. In his angriest moments he expels ink. He is based on Vito Corleone from The Godfather and Ernst Stavro Blofeld from the James Bond films. He appears as the overarching antagonist in both "Missing Kelp Seeds" and "Haunted Schoolhouse".

=== Freddi Fish and the Case of the Missing Kelp Seeds (1994) ===
- Augie – the octopus usher at the theater past the volcano.
- Fiddler Crab – a crab who gets stuck in a cage until Freddi uses a key to unlock it. Literal to his name, he plays his claw like a fiddle and always sings his dialogue.
- Gabby Halibut – a young purple fish with yellow fins who gets stuck in the rocks in a cave until Freddi and Luther use a wooden board to free him.
- Herman – a crab living in a glowing shell and has trouble sleeping. Freddi can give Herman another shell that doesn't glow.
- Jason – a purple fish with white fins who greatly resembles Putt-Putt from another Humongous Entertainment game franchise.
- Junkyard Dogfish – a grumpy dogfish who lives at the junkyard.
- King Crab – the friendly King of the ocean, who loves pearls.
- Mr. Starfish – a starfish teacher.
- Mrs. Halibut – Gabby's mother.
- Phineas McFinn – a pirate who loves to play music and sing.
- Snappy – a grumpy, depressed turtle, whom Freddi cheers up by giving him a flower.

=== Freddi Fish 2: The Case of the Haunted Schoolhouse (1996) ===
- Barnacle Bob – an orange octopus who specializes in selling pulleys and always speaks in rhyme.
- Captain Schnitzel – a blue flounder who wears a captain's hat and a brown sweater and is an expert in knots.
- Mr. Triplefin – a blue and aqua fish with green fins, who is a retired janitor, lives in a secluded shack and plays a guitar.
- Mrs. Croaker – a purple fish who wears a magenta dress and is Freddi and Luther's school teacher.
- Tucker Turtle – a green sea turtle and a good friend to Freddi and Luther. Sometimes, he gets his head caught in a pipe and Freddi and Luther use oil to get him unstuck.

=== Freddi Fish 3: The Case of the Stolen Conch Shell (1998) ===
- Claw – a mean and nasty orange lobster who owns a "bully's club". He was voiced by Craig English.
- Horst Fedders – a purple seahorse and a tourist, who speaks a foreign language. He was voiced by Ken Boynton.
- Magenta – a monkey who loves bananas. She was voiced by Lyn McManus.
- Nadine – a pink narwhal who always takes care of her tooth. She was voiced by Lisa Wick.
- Old Soggy – Blenny's pet dogfish that resembles a basset hound.
- Pierre – a pompous yellow needlefish with a French accent, who works as a tailor and often brags about his mending skills. He was voiced by Ken Boynton.
- Rosy Pearl – a blue squid who acts as a host of a talent show. She was voiced by Lauren Tewes.
- Uncle Blenny – Luther's uncle and the "Grand Exalted Keeper of the Conch". He was blamed for stealing the conch and Freddi and Luther had to expose the real crook. He was voiced by Craig English.
- Wilbert – a 4-year-old orange guppy, who loves the Founder's Day festival.

=== Freddi Fish 4: The Case of the Hogfish Rustlers of Briny Gulch (1999) ===
- Cousin Calico Catfish – Freddi's cousin, a yellow catfish with light blue hair and hogfish rancher. She was voiced by Kate Fleming.
- E Tippet – a red hermit crab who makes his home in his own mailbox. He was voiced by Andromeda Dunker.
- Eight Finger Phil – a blue octopus with a green bowler hat. He serves as the piano player of the Sodaloon. He was voiced by Ken Boynton.
- Fluke – a blue sperm whale who has a cabaret hall inside her mouth. She was voiced by Kate Fleming.
- Goby and Moray – two hogfish rustlers and the game's antagonists, who stole Calico's hogfish herd. Goby is beige and skinny, while Moray is dark brown and fat. Moray's job is to feed the hogfish (who hate his cooking), and Goby's job is to guard the hideout. Moray is shown to be smarter than Goby. Goby was voiced by William Dufrees, and Moray by Mike Shapiro.
- Gruntle – one of Calico's prized hogfish. He was voiced by Sharon Collar.
- Hammerhead and Sawfish – two sharks who do carpentry and frequently drink coffee. Hammerhead was voiced by Gene Cordova and Sawfish by Dex Manley.
- Hungry Shark – a pink shark, who wears a green hat with a yellow ribbon and has only two visible teeth and is good at chewing through stuff.
- Nelson Torso – a blue and strong fish wearing cadet blue overalls with a front pocket and constructing glasses and has a son named Half Nelson. He specializes in making belt buckles. He was voiced by Gene Cordova.
- Puffer – a mint green puffer fish who tends to inflate when anyone comes near. He was voiced by Sharon Collar.
- Sahara Slim – a reddish brown, elderly fish who claims to have gone through the Sahara Desert. He was voiced by Scott Burns.
- Saltwater Stella – a purple fish who is the owner of the Sodaloon. She was voiced by Kymberli Colbourne.
- Shady Shark – a green loan shark who has a debt to collect from Gill Barker. He was voiced by Ken Boynton.
- Sheriff Shrimp – a turquoise shrimp who's the sheriff of Briny Gulch. He was voiced by Mike Madeoy.
- Squids – a trio of blue, orange and purple ink spitting squids who reside at the entrance to the Sodaloon. The purple squid is named Orchid, the orange one is named Apricot (Ape for short), and the blue one is named Periwinkle (Perry for short). Orchid was voiced by Kymberli Colbourne, Apricot/Ape by William Dufrees, and Periwinkle/Perry by Andromeda Dunker.
- U – an orange sea snail. U's real name is Uriah Jedadiah Eruipides Algernon Fortesque Forsythe (he forgets the rest). He was voiced by Chris Wicklund.

=== Freddi Fish 5: The Case of the Creature of Coral Cove (2001) ===
- Al B. Core – a large Maya Blue fish, who owns a stand for exchanging trading cards. His name is a play on the word "albacore". He was voiced by Ken Boynton.
- Clyde – an absent-minded barber who gives fish makeovers, with the same scale and fin colors as Freddi. He was voiced by Craig English.
- Dadfish – a grouchy pink fish with red fins who lives with his baby daughter and doesn't like anyone touching his house roof. He was voiced by Rick May.
- Marty's Dogfish – a shark who is Marty's guard dog, blocking the entrance until Freddi and Luther use a rubber duck.
- Donna – a beautiful pink fish with a blonde crest and blue eyes and wears a working hat. She is a mechanic who repairs the Claw Machine. She lost her screwdriver necklace which fell into a jawfish cave when she got scared seeing Xamfear until Freddi and Luther feed it with Planktos. She was voiced by Kelly Wright.
- Earl – a smart green turtle with grey hair who has an excellent skill in map reading. He was voiced by Craig English.
- Gillian Barker – Gill Barker's twin sister, who is a saleswoman, similar to her brother. She was voiced by Ken Boynton.
- Kipper – a large and sweet pink fish who wears a magenta dress with a beige collar and is the owner of the taffy shop. She was voiced by Kymberli Colbourne.
- Kit Craftsman – a wimpy blue octopus with orange hair who works as a craftsman. He was voiced by Dennis Bateman.
- Laren – a shy turquoise fish with emerald green fins and a tail who wears a patched shirt and an orange and blue hat and tries to make his own jug band. He speaks with a Wild Western accent. He was voiced by Ken Boynton.
- Marge the Sarge – a pink fish with overgrown red hair and wears green military uniform. She is a military strategist who trains tetras and is one of the citizens. She was voiced by Bobbi Kotula.
- Marty Sardini – an evil, selfish, and greedy green fish who developed Coral Cove Park. He secretly drove Xamfear out of the park and stole his deed so he could prevent his reputation from being ruined. He also lied to the citizens about Xamfear being an evil sea monster terrorizing the park and manipulated them to rise up against Xamfear. He was voiced by Rick May.
- Mayor Marlin – a blue marlin and mayor of the ocean. He was voiced by Dennis Bateman.
- Nick – a purple fish who owns a shop full of cool stuff. He was voiced by Mark Lund.
- Officer Beverly – a yellow fish with red fins and wears a police hat. She guards the entrance to Coral Cove Park. She was voiced by Bobbi Kotula.
- Rollo – a literal clown fish (not to be confused with a clownfish) who speaks in a monotone voice and sells jokes and inventions. He was voiced by Ken Boynton.
- Xamfear Duncan Dogberry Valentine – a giant, three-eyed pink sea monster with beige spots and fins who is the false antagonist of the game and lives in Coral Cove Park. He was voiced by Jock Blaney.

== Books ==
Various children's books about Freddi Fish have been published by Lyrick Publishing, including story books, colouring books and activity books.

Title	Date	Writer	Publisher	Illustrator
Freddi Fish: Color and Activity Book	2000	Guy Davis	Lyrick Publishing	Art Mawhinney
Freddi Fish the Big Froople Match	July 2000	Dave Grossman	Lyrick Publishing	R. Alvord
Freddi Fish: The Missing Letters Mystery	August 2000	Dave Grossman, N. S. Greenfield	Lyrick Publishing	Jay B. Johnson
Freddi Fish a Whale of a Tale!	January 2001	Scott Nickel	Lyrick Publishing	Jay B. Johnson
Freddi Fish What's Different?	January 2001	Nancy Parent	Lyrick Publishing	Cary Rillo
Freddi Fish and the Pirate's Treasure	July 15, 2001	Guy Davis	Lyrick Publishing	Becky Winslow
