= Putt-Putt (series) =

- Putt-Putt and Pep
- Genres: Adventure, edutainment
- Developer: Humongous Entertainment
- Publishers: Humongous Entertainment; Atari; Infogrames; Night Dive Studios
- Creator: Shelley Day
- Platforms: DOS, Microsoft Windows, 3DO, Macintosh, iOS, Android, Nintendo Switch, PlayStation 4
- First release: Putt-Putt Joins the Parade; November 6, 1992
- Latest release: Putt-Putt's Fun House; May 22, 2013

Putt-Putt is a series of point-and-click adventure games and puzzle video games aimed towards children created by Humongous Entertainment. This franchise was Humongous Entertainment's first game series to be developed. They primarily involve clicking to get to a destination, although some sub-quests and mini-games involve the keyboard. The main character, Putt-Putt, an anthropomorphic purple convertible, and his dog, Pep, travel to various locations.

== History ==
Putt-Putt was originally thought up by Shelley Day as a series of bedtime stories for her son, Travis; the first story involved Putt-Putt saving a cat caught in a tree.

Child actor Jason Ellefson provided Putt-Putt's voice for the first eight games. In the next three games, Nancy Cartwright voiced Putt-Putt. Michelle Thorson voiced Putt-Putt in Pep's Birthday Surprise.

The games are supported by ScummVM and thus can be played on other platforms such as handhelds. Humongous has brought several Putt-Putt and other titles to iOS and Android.

In 1997, Humongous made an agreement with Lancit Media Entertainment to create an animated TV series titled Putt-Putt 'n Pals, along with films and home video releases. Ultimately, the deal fell through.

Several games from the original series were later re-released by Humongous on Steam in April 2014, alongside games from the Pajama Sam, Freddi Fish, and Spy Fox series. The first two games used pixel art graphics; starting with the third game, the series uses hand-drawn animation.

== Games ==
Humongous Entertainment classified the adventure games as Junior Adventures for kids 3-8.

Adventure Games
Title	Release date	Platforms	Developer/Publisher
Putt-Putt Joins the Parade	November 6, 1992 (MS-DOS): 1993 (3DO); 1995 (Macintosh, Microsoft Windows); April 17, 2014 (Linux, Steam)	3DO, Android, iOS, Macintosh, Microsoft Windows, MS-DOS	Humongous Entertainment
Putt-Putt Goes to the Moon	October 1, 1993 (MS-DOS); 1994 (3DO); 1995 (Macintosh, Microsoft Windows); April 17, 2014 (Steam); May 5, 2014 (Linux)	3DO, Android, iOS, Macintosh, Microsoft Windows, MS-DOS	Humongous Entertainment
Putt-Putt Saves the Zoo	August 10, 1995 (Microsoft Windows); October 18, 1995 (Macintosh); 2005 (DVD); November 15, 2011 (iOS); 2012 (Android); April 17, 2014 (Steam); July 3, 2014 (Linux); August 13, 2015 (iOS Re-Release); February 10, 2022 (Nintendo Switch); November 3, 2022 (PlayStation 4)	Android, DVD, iOS, Macintosh, Microsoft Windows, Nintendo Switch, PlayStation 4	Humongous Entertainment
Putt-Putt Travels Through Time	June 1, 1997 (Macintosh, Microsoft Windows); August 14, 2012 (iOS); October 4, 2013 (Android); April 17, 2014 (Steam); May 15, 2014 (Linux); January 3, 2022 (Nintendo Switch); November 3, 2022 (PlayStation 4)	Android, iOS, Macintosh, Microsoft Windows, Nintendo Switch, PlayStation 4	Humongous Entertainment
Putt-Putt Enters the Race	January 1, 1999 (Macintosh, Microsoft Windows); April 17, 2014 (Steam); June 27, 2014 (Android, iOS)	Android, iOS, Macintosh, Microsoft Windows	Humongous Entertainment
Putt-Putt Joins the Circus	July 11, 2000 (Macintosh, Microsoft Windows); October 14, 2013 (iOS); April 17, 2014 (Steam); May 29, 2014 (Linux)	Android, iOS, Macintosh, Microsoft Windows	Humongous Entertainment
Putt-Putt: Pep's Birthday Surprise	September 16, 2003 (Macintosh, Microsoft Windows); April 17, 2014 (Steam)	Macintosh, Microsoft Windows	Humongous Entertainment
Junior Arcade
Title	Release date	Platforms	Developer/Publisher
Putt-Putt and Pep's Dog on a Stick	October 15, 1996 (Macintosh, Microsoft Windows); January 6, 2014 (iOS); April 17, 2014 (Steam)	iOS, Macintosh, Microsoft Windows	Humongous Entertainment
Putt-Putt and Pep's Balloon-o-Rama	October 15, 1996 (Macintosh, Microsoft Windows); 1999 (Handheld); April 17, 2014 (Steam)	Handheld, Linux, Macintosh, Microsoft Windows	Humongous Entertainment; Toymax (Handheld)
Activity Packs
Title	Release date	Platforms	Developer/Publisher
Putt-Putt's Fun Pack	March 26, 1993	3DO, Macintosh, Microsoft Windows, MS-DOS	Humongous Entertainment
Putt-Putt and Fatty Bear's Activity Pack	March 25, 1994 (Macintosh, Microsoft Windows); April 17, 2014 (Steam)	Macintosh, Microsoft Windows	Humongous Entertainment
Putt-Putt's One-Stop Fun Shop	May 23, 2000	Macintosh, Microsoft Windows	Humongous Entertainment
Putt-Putt's Fun House	May 22, 2013	iOS	Humongous Entertainment; Nimbus Games

=== Customization ===
Players can change Putt-Putt's color to original purple, red, orange, yellow, green or blue. All colors can be painted on again. This also changes the color of the dashboard in Putt-Putt Enters the Race and Putt-Putt Joins the Circus. In Putt-Putt Joins the Parade and Putt-Putt Enters the Race, each color change costs three coins that can be collected in the game world. In Putt-Putt: Pep's Birthday Surprise, Putt-Putt's color can only be changed temporarily before reverting to purple after some traveling. His color can also be changed in certain levels of Putt-Putt and Pep's Balloon-o-Rama by using Pep to pop certain balloons tied to paint buckets, then catching the bucket containing the desired color as it falls to change Putt-Putt to.

== Availability ==
- For Steam the games were released as single games, or bundled together in the "Putt-Putt Complete Pack" or came packaged with all Humongous Entertainment games in "Humongous Entertainment Complete Pack".
- Humongous Entertainment released 2 CD-packs titled "Humongous Entertainment Triple Treat" 1 and 2. The first pack included Putt-Putt Saves the Zoo, Pajama Sam's Sock Works and Freddi Fish and the Case of the Missing Kelp Seeds, while the second pack included Putt-Putt Travels Through Time, Pajama Sam: No Need to Hide When It's Dark Outside and Freddi Fish and Luther's Maze Madness.
- Humongous Entertainment released a "Putt-Putt Fun & Learning Kindergarten Edition" package with a Putt-Putt notebook and a CD that included Putt-Putt Saves the Zoo and Big Thinkers Kindergarten.
- Putt-Putt and Pep's Balloon-O-Rama was released for Windows and Macintosh on a compilation CD titled "Super Duper Arcade 1", along with Spy Fox in: Cheese Chase, Pajama Sam's Sock Works and Freddi Fish and Luther's Water Worries.
- Putt-Putt and Pep's Dog on a Stick was released for Windows and Macintosh on a compilation CD titled "Super Duper Arcade 2", along with Spy Fox in: Hold the Mustard, Pajama Sam's Lost & Found and Freddi Fish and Luther's Maze Madness.
- Putt-Putt Travels Through Time was released on the Nintendo Switch eShop alongside Freddi Fish 3: The Case of the Stolen Conch Shell in January 2022. The next month, Putt-Putt Saves the Zoo was released alongside Pajama Sam: No Need to Hide When It's Dark Outside, Pajama Sam: Thunder and Lightning Aren't so Frightening, and Spy Fox in: Dry Cereal.

== Books ==
Various children's books about Putt-Putt have been published by Lyrick Publishing and Random House. A cassette tape audio adaptation was created for Putt-Putt's Night Before Christmas.

Title	Date	Writer	Publisher	Illustrator
Putt-Putt's Night Before Christmas	December 1995	Laurie Bauman Arnold	Humongous Entertainment	Derek McCaughan, Edward Pun
Putt-Putt and Pep	May 7, 1996	Del Thompson	Random House Books For Young Readers	
Putt-Putt: The Great Pet Chase	July 2000	Laurie Bauman Arnold, Tricia Legault	Lyrick Publishing	
Go, Go, Putt-Putt Go!	2000	Laurie Bauman Arnold, N.S. Greenfield	Lyrick Publishing	Darren McKee
Putt-Putt: Lost In Time	January 2001	Nancy Parent	Lyrick Publishing	Josie Yee
Putt-Putt: Race Against the Clock	July 2001	Gayla Amaral	Lyrick Publishing	Sue DiCiccio
On the Road With Putt-Putt	July 2001		Lyrick Publishing	

== Reception ==
The Putt-Putt series received various awards including "All-Star Software Award" from Children's Software Revue, "Reader's Choice Award" from Mac Home Journal and "2000 Best Picks Award" from Choosing Children's Software.
