= Putt-Putt and Pep's Balloon-o-Rama =

1996 video game

- Rereleased Windows / Macintosh cover art
- Developer: Humongous Entertainment
- Publisher: Humongous Entertainment (Note: The Steam release was co-published by Tommo and Night Dive Studios.)
- Director: Ron Gilbert
- Designers: Laurie Rose Bauman; Annie Fox; Ron Gilbert; Shelley Day
- Writers: Laurie Rose Bauman; Annie Fox
- Composer: George Sanger
- Series: Putt-Putt
- Engine: SCUMM
- Platforms: MS-DOS, Macintosh, Windows, Linux
- Release: October 18, 1996
- Genre: Action
- Mode: Single-player

Putt-Putt and Pep's Balloon-o-Rama is a 1996 action video game developed by Humongous Entertainment. The game is part of the Putt-Putt series of educational video games. It was part of a series of Junior Arcade games, targeted at kids aged three to eight.

Putt-Putt and Pep's Balloon-o-Rama was originally released on October 18, 1996, along with Putt-Putt and Pep's Dog on a Stick. The game was re-released on Linux in April 2014. The game was included in the Putt-Putt Deluxe Pack. A LCD handheld version of the game was also released in 1999 by ToyMax.

== Gameplay ==
In this junior arcade-style game, players help Putt-Putt bounce Pep into the air to pop balloons. Players can also create their own levels. The game is a Breakout clone, but gravity influences Pep's movement, causing it to slightly bend and arc. The game teaches players timing and hand-eye coordination.

There are 120 levels to play. Certain balloons also have certain properties, such as concealing a smaller balloon that must also be destroyed, containing candy that can be caught for bonus points and/or trash that deducts points, or being able to appear after a certain amount of time. Players can earn more points by having Pep pop multiple balloons without coming back to Putt-Putt to create combos, pop question mark-shaped balloons to obtain power-ups and even destroy a passing small flying saucer to enter a bonus round on the Moon where balloons are replaced with saucers. If Putt-Putt fails to catch Pep, one life is lost, and running out of lives results in the current score being reset to zero, although it is possible to turn on "Junior Helpers" that grant unlimited lives or make it easier to catch Pep.

The LCD version of the game, due to its technical limitations, features almost none of the special mechanics featured in the computer versions, playing out as a more strict and simpler Breakout clone. Putt-Putt's movement is controlled with a thumb dial shaped into his steering wheel.

== Plot ==
Putt-Putt and Pep have balloons, but Pep accidentally releases them, so the two embark on a journey across various locations in prior Putt-Putt adventures (such as the zoo in Putt-Putt Saves the Zoo and the cave where Putt-Putt first found Pep at the end of Putt-Putt Joins the Parade), to find and pop balloons of many kinds, by having Putt-Putt bounce Pep into the air to hit them. Their journey eventually leads them to the surface of the Moon once again, which they reach by boarding a spaceship. After Pep pops every single balloon in the levels and he and Putt-Putt return to Earth, the latter commends the former's balloon-popping skills.

== Development ==
Designer Rhett Mathis noted that the developers had "created an animated world of arcade fun and made it kid-friendly". A Junior Helper feature was included to make play easier for younger children, for example making balloons easier to pop. Ralph Giuffre, Humongous Entertainment's executive vice president of marketing and licensing, said that the series was created to give players the opportunity play games with action in a nonviolent context.

At the conclusion of the "Circus Trip of a Lifetime" Sweepstakes, which ran from July 1 to September 30, 2000, five hundred second-place winners were given a free copy of the game.

== Critical reception ==
Electric playground deemed the graphics "great" and the music "catchy", and noted it caters both to players who want to play in short bursts, and those who are obsessed with reaching the next level. Allgame praised the game for its addictive nature comparable to Tetris, and said it was fun for adults too.
