= George Sanger (musician) =

American songwriter

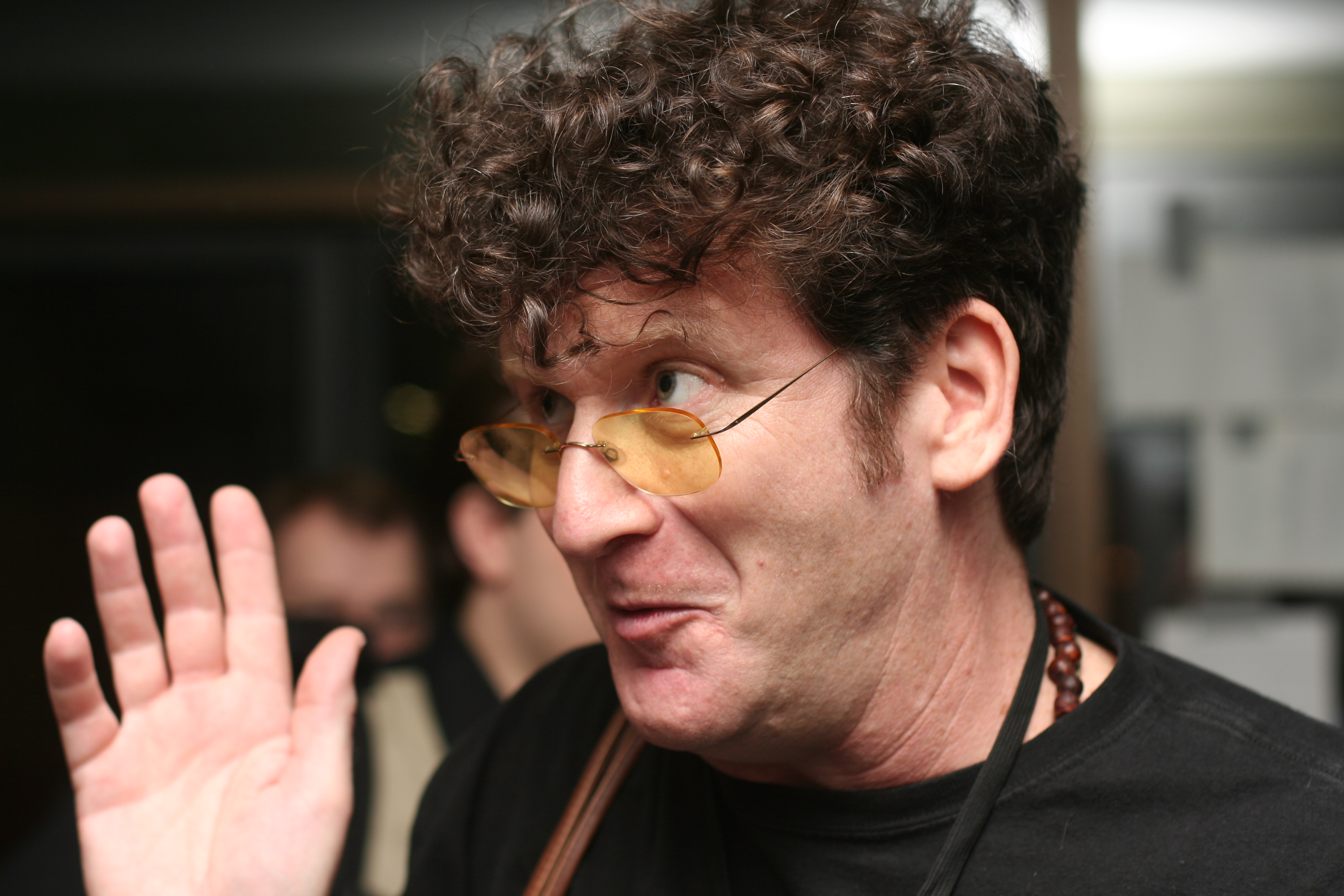

Background information
- Also known as: The Fat Man
- Genre: Video game music
- Occupations: Composer, musician
- Years active: 1983–present
- Label: Haight-Masonic Laboratories
- Member of: Team Fat
- Website: www.fatman.com

George Sanger, also known as The Fat Man, is an American musician who has composed music for video games, beginning in 1983. Some of his best-known works include The 7th Guest, Wing Commander, Hard Nova, Maniac Mansion (NES version), Loom, Tux Racer, and Zombies Ate My Neighbors. Sanger leads the band Team Fat, which includes fellow video game music composers Dave Govett, Joe McDermott and Kevin Weston Phelan. He has written a novel, The Fat Man on Game Audio: Tasty Morsels of Sonic Goodness, described by him as, "a book about game audio wrapped in a biography wrapped in a philosophy on life."

== Works ==
=== Albums ===
George Sanger and Team Fat have released three albums:

1. 7/11 – based on the music from The 7th Guest and The 11th Hour
2. Surf.com
3. Flabby Rode
4. Wing One - Music from Wing Commander I

=== Games ===
Title	Year
Capture the Flag	1983
Maniac Mansion (NES)	1990
Wing Commander	1990
Loom (an adaptation of Tchaikovsky's Swan Lake)	1990
Stormovik: SU-25 Soviet Attack Fighter	1990
Swords and Serpents (NES)	1990
Death Knights of Krynn	1991
Fun House (NES)	1991
Home Alone (NES)	1991
Lexi-Cross (PC)	1991
Might and Magic III: Isles of Terra (PC - title theme only)	1991
Monster Truck Rally	1991
Wing Commander II: Vengeance of the Kilrathi	1991
RPM Racing	1991
Hong Kong Mahjong Pro	1992
Planet's Edge	1992
Ultima Underworld	1992
Faceball 2000 (SNES)	1992
Wings 2: Aces High	1992
Master of Orion (PC)	1993
The 7th Guest	1993
SEAL Team	1993
Zombies Ate My Neighbors	1993
IndyCar Racing	1993
Putt-Putt Goes to the Moon	1993
SimCity 2000	1993
SSN-21 Seawolf (PC)	1994
Are You Afraid of the Dark? The Tale of Orpheo's Curse	1994
NASCAR Racing	1994
Master of Magic	1994
Freddi Fish and the Case of the Missing Kelp Seeds	1994
U.S. Navy Fighters	1994
Putt-Putt Saves the Zoo	1995
Shannara	1995
The 11th Hour	1995
This Means War!	1995
Clue Chronicles: Fatal Illusion	2000
Pajama Sam 3: You Are What You Eat from Your Head to Your Feet	2000
Scene It?	2000
Tux Racer	2000
SpongeBob SquarePants: Revenge of the Flying Dutchman	2002
Mike's Monstrous Adventure	2002
Shadowbane	2003
Piglet's Big Game	2003
Putt-Putt: Pep's Birthday Surprise	2003
Equilibria	2003
Evil Genius	2004
Intellivision Lives!	2004
Scene It?: Turner Classic Movies Edition	2005
Scene It?: Music	2006
The Incredible Hulk	2008
Yonder: The Cloud Catcher Chronicles	2017
Mortimer Beckett and the Book of Gold	2017
Delicious: Emily's Moms vs Dads	2017
Parker & Lane: Criminal Justice	2018
Dr. Cares: Family Practice	2018
Dr. Cares: Amy's Pet Clinic	2018
Amber's Airline: 7 Wonders	2019
The 13th Doll: A Fan Game of The 7th Guest	2019

== Awards and recognition ==
On March 7, 2007, Sanger received the IGDA Award For Community Contribution. The award was given for his numerous programs that encourage interactive audio innovation and industry improvement.

On March 5, 2015, George Sanger received the Game Audio Network Guild (GANG) Lifetime Achievement Award.
