= Putt-Putt Goes to the Moon =

1993 point-and-click adventure game

- Rereleased Windows / Macintosh cover art featuring Putt-Putt and Pep (both foreground) and Rover (background)
- Developer: Humongous Entertainment
- Publisher: Humongous Entertainment (Note: The Steam release was co-published by Tommo and Night Dive Studios.)
- Director: Ron Gilbert
- Designers: Laurie Rose Bauman; Annie Fox; Ron Gilbert; Shelley Day
- Writers: Laurie Rose Bauman; Annie Fox
- Composer: George Sanger
- Series: Putt-Putt
- Engine: SCUMM
- Platforms: MS-DOS, 3DO, Macintosh, Windows, Linux
- Release: October 1, 1993: MS-DOS October 1, 1993 3DO 1994 Macintosh, Windows 1995 Linux May 5, 2014
- Genre: Adventure
- Mode: Single-player

Putt-Putt Goes To The Moon is a 1993 children's point-and-click adventure game developed and published by Humongous Entertainment under its Junior Adventures label. In the game, the player must help Putt-Putt find pieces for a rocket ship that will allow him to return home from the moon.

The game is the second entry in the Putt-Putt series, being preceded by Putt-Putt Joins the Parade (1992) and followed by Putt-Putt Saves the Zoo (1995). It is the last Junior Adventures game to use pixel art graphics, with future games (starting with 1994's Freddi Fish and the Case of the Missing Kelp Seeds) instead utilizing hand-drawn animation.

Originally released on October 1, 1993 for MS-DOS, the game has been ported to the 3DO, Microsoft Windows, Macintosh OS, Linux, iOS, and Android. In 2014, the game was re-released on Steam.

== Plot ==
Putt-Putt and Pep are invited by a scientist named Mr. Firebird to visit his Fireworks Factory. At the factory, Pep chases a butterfly, only to cause a firecracker to emerge and launch Putt-Putt into outer space. Putt-Putt lands on the Moon, where he begins searching for a way to return home.

As Putt-Putt explores the Moon, he falls off an unstable bridge but is rescued by a lunar rover called Rover, who was left stranded on the Moon by astronauts. Rover then takes Putt-Putt to a nearby city called Moon City, where a rocket is on sale. The owners of the rocket give Putt-Putt a blueprint that shows all of the parts that are needed to fix it. Putt-Putt then sets out to collect these parts with Rover's help. After buying and fixing the rocket, Putt-Putt and Rover return to Earth, where Putt-Putt reunites with his friends and introduces them to Rover.

== Gameplay ==
Putt-Putt Goes to the Moon uses the same mechanics as its predecessor including Putt-Putt's glove box inventory window, Car Horn, Radio and Accelerator.

== Release ==
The 3DO version of the game was shown at the Winter Consumer Electronics Show in Las Vegas around early January 1994. Copies of the game came packaged with an activity book containing Math and English exercises plus a Putt-Putt pen.

== Reception ==
Reception

Awards
Publication	Award
Choosing Children's Software	1999 Best Picks for the Holidays Award
Anders CD-ROM Guide	1997 Medallion Award
Parents' Choice	1994 Honor Award
Home PC	Top 100 Products
Multimedia World	Best Children's Title
The National Parenting Center	Seal of Approval
MacUser	Four Mouse Award
CD-ROM World	The CD-ROM 100 Best
CES	1994 Innovations Showcase Award Winner

In April 1994, Computer Gaming World said that the game "offers a classic adventure experience for children (and adults)".

The combined sales of Putt-Putt Goes to the Moon, Putt-Putt Joins the Parade and Putt Putt Saves the Zoo surpassed one million units by June 1997.
