= Grand Prix Circuit =

Grand Prix Circuit may refer to:

- Grand Prix Circuit (video game), a 1988 motor sports video game
- Grand Prix tennis circuit, one of the two major professional world tennis circuits of the 1970s and 1980s
