= Freddi Fish and the Case of the Missing Kelp Seeds =

1994 video game

- 1998 cover art featuring Freddi Fish (foreground) along with Luther, Grandma Grouper, Boss the shark, and the Squidfather (all background)
- Developer: Humongous Entertainment (Note: Ported to digiBlast by Transposia and the Wii by Mistic Software (Wii).)
- Publisher: Humongous Entertainment (Note: The digiBlast port was published by Atari. The Wii version was published by Majesco in the United States and Atari Europe in Europe. The iOS port and Android version were published by Tommo. The Steam release was co-published by Tommo and Night Dive Studios.)
- Producer: Ron Gilbert
- Designers: Ron Gilbert; Larry Kay; Tami Caryl Borowick
- Writer: Larry Kay
- Composer: George Sanger
- Series: Freddi Fish
- Engine: SCUMM
- Platforms: Macintosh, Windows, digiBlast, Wii, iOS, Android, Linux, Nintendo Switch, PlayStation 4
- Release: November 7, 1994: Macintosh, Windows November 7, 1994 digiBlast 2005 Wii August 29, 2008 iOS October 10, 2013 Android April 3, 2014 Linux April 17, 2014 Switch, PlayStation 4 February 29, 2024
- Genre: Adventure
- Mode: Single-player

Freddi Fish and the Case of the Missing Kelp Seeds is a video game developed and published by Humongous Entertainment and the first game released for the Freddi Fish franchise. It was released for Windows on November 7, 1994. The game was followed by Freddi Fish 2: The Case of the Haunted Schoolhouse in 1996.

In 2008, it was released on the Wii under the title Freddi Fish in Kelp Seed Mystery as well as Windows and Macintosh, and on Android with a shortened title Freddi Fish and the Missing Kelp Seeds. The Wii version's availability was limited by legal problems concerning its development. A spin-off handheld LCD game titled Freddi Fish: Jellyfish Jamboree was also released in 1999 that was based on a minigame from Kelp Seeds. Ports for the Nintendo Switch and PlayStation 4 were released in 2024.

== Gameplay ==
In Freddi Fish and the Case of the Missing Kelp Seeds, players guide Freddi Fish and her friend Luther as they search for Grandma Grouper's missing kelp seeds, which are needed to feed the sea community. The adventure takes place across underwater locations such as canyons, reefs, caves, and the ocean floor. As Freddi and Luther explore, they collect objects that help them progress and uncover clues about where the seeds may be, including areas like King Crab's castle and a sunken ship. The environments contain numerous interactive spots to click, and players can pause the investigation to engage in optional mini‑games such as Feeding Time, Augie's Theater, and Starfish Math. The story concludes once the kelp seeds are successfully recovered and returned.

== Plot ==
Freddi Fish visits the house of Grandma Grouper, where she learns that Grandma's treasure chest of kelp seeds which provides the food for the whole ocean has been stolen, putting the entire population in danger of starvation if the treasure is not found soon. Freddi courageously offers to find the treasure chest for Grandma Grouper. After leaving Grandma Grouper's house, Freddi meets her friend, Luther, who accidentally knocks down a bottle while trying to perform a trick. When Freddi and Luther investigate, they discover a note lodged inside, which gives clues towards more bottles that lead to Grandma Grouper's treasure chest. Upon learning from Freddi about the missing kelp seeds, Luther agrees to help her look for the treasure.

Unbeknownst to Freddi and Luther, it was two sharks named Boss and Spongehead, who were the ones that stole the treasure as part of their plan to help their boss, the Squidfather, grow kelp for themselves; Spongehead had hidden four bottles with notes in them in random locations so he could find his way back to the treasure chest. As Freddi and Luther find more of Spongehead's clues to the treasure's location, Boss becomes increasingly furious at Spongehead for not remembering where he hid the chest, so he takes him to the Squidfather as punishment for his failures. Upon finding out that Spongehead lost the treasure, the enraged Squidfather spews out ink, causing a frightened Spongehead to remember where he left the treasure chest, so he and Boss go to retrieve it. At the same time, Freddi and Luther find the last bottle, which reveals that the treasure is hidden at a sunken ship.

Upon their arrival at the sunken ship, Freddi and Luther spot the treasure inside one of the ship's rooms and, after gaining access by using a crank handle to open a window, attempt to take it, but they are stopped by Boss and Spongehead, who order them to hand it over. Freddi boldly refuses and explains that everyone can grow kelp if they share it, which the sharks agree on. While the sharks go to tell the Squidfather about their deal, Freddi and Luther take the treasure chest back to Grandma Grouper's home and spread the kelp all throughout the ocean, thus allowing everyone to enjoy the kelp. After Freddi and Luther return the treasure chest to Grandma Grouper, she invites them into her house so they can tell her about their adventure.

== Development ==
Development of Freddi Fish and the Case of the Missing Kelp Seeds started sometime in 1993; it was initially intended to feature pixelated graphics and be released on the MS-DOS, similar to the style of previous games developed by Humongous. Halfway through production of the game, Humongous Entertainment co-founder Ron Gilbert went to a conference and saw examples of hand-drawn animation; this prompted the studio to scrap the pixelated animation and start over with hand-drawn graphics.

Another significant change that occurred during development was the decision to change Freddi from a boy to a girl. Game designer Tami Borowick justified it because she sought to challenge the common trend at the time that girls would play male characters, but not the other way around, thus making Freddi the only playable female Junior Adventure heroine. As the dialogue script already had male pronouns written down for the character by that time, the script writer was forced to change them to female for the final product. When the writer also added a few more lines seeming to imply weakness whenever she came across an obstacle that wasn't easily overcome, Borowick pushed back and cut such lines out, believing that it would not reflect her character. Due to the common practice of adult women voicing children of both genders, Borowick added a line for Freddi in the sequel that clarifies and ascertains that she is a girl.

== Reception ==
Reception

Review scores
Publication	Score
Adventure Gamers	3/5
GameZone	7/10
Unikgamer	7/10

Awards
Publication	Award
Newsweek	Editor's Choice Award 1996
Parenting Magazine	Software Magic Award 1995
National Parenting	Seal of Approval 1995
Computer Gaming World	No. 1 Family Software Title of 1995
HomePC	Kids' Lab No. 1 Rated
Family PC	Family Tested/Recommended
PC Magazine	Top 100 CD-ROMs of 1995
Parent's Choice	Honor Award 1995
Gaming Magazine	Best Children's Game

Freddi Fish and the Case of the Missing Kelp Seeds received generally positive reviews from critics. Allgame gave a 4-star rating, GameZone rated 7 out of 10, Adventure Gamers gave a 3-star rating, and Unikgamer gave a 7 out 10 score. It also received over 20 awards.

The Case of the Missing Kelp Seeds won Electronic Entertainment's 1994 "Best Edutainment Title" award. The editors wrote that the game features well-made original characters, a strong storyline, appropriately challenging puzzles, and beautiful animation.

The Case of the Missing Kelp Seeds was a commercial success, with sales of 250,000 units by 1999. During 2001 alone, Freddi Fish sold 54,447 retail units in North America, according to PC Data.

== Legacy ==
The success of Freddi Fish and the Case of the Missing Kelp Seeds led to four sequels being released. The first of which, Freddi Fish 2: The Case of the Haunted Schoolhouse, was released in 1996. In 1998, Humongous Entertainment released Freddi Fish 3: The Case of the Stolen Conch Shell, followed Freddi Fish 4: The Case of the Hogfish Rustlers of Briny Gulch in the next year. The last sequel, Freddi Fish 5: The Case of the Creature of Coral Cove, was released in 2001.

Throughout the franchise's run, several spin-off games have been released. In 1997, Humongous Entertainment released two arcade-themed games: Freddi Fish and Luther's Maze Madness and Freddi Fish and Luther's Water Worries. Both games would be rereleased in 1999 as part of the Super Duper Junior Arcade collections. In 2000, an activity game entitled Freddi Fish's One-Stop Fun Shop was released. In 2008, another activity game entitled Freddi Fish: ABC Under The Sea was released for the Nintendo DS. Five years later, a third activity game entitled Freddi Fish's Fun House was released for mobile devices.
