= Spy Fox =

Video game series

- Spy Fox
- Genres: Adventure, edutainment
- Developer: Humongous Entertainment
- Publishers: Humongous Entertainment; Atari; GT Interactive; Infogrames
- Creators: Bret Barrett; Brad Carlton
- Platforms: Windows, Macintosh, Wii, iOS, Linux, Android, Nintendo Switch, PlayStation 4
- First release: Spy Fox in "Dry Cereal"; October 17, 1997
- Latest release: Spy Fox 3: "Operation Ozone"; May 1, 2001

Spy Fox is a series of adventure video games from Humongous Entertainment starring a fictional anthropomorphic fox of the same name, intended for children 8 and up. The series follows the eponymous character, an anthropomorphic fox and secret agent tasked with stopping global crises. Many of the game's names and plot elements are spoofs of the James Bond and Get Smart series.

== Summary ==
Spy Fox (voiced by Bob Zenk in Dry Cereal and Cheese Chase and Mike Madeoy in the other three games) works for a spy agency called SPY Corps. His cohorts include Monkey Penny (his secretarial assistant), Professor Quack (creator of the SPY Corps gadgets), the SPY Corps Chief, and the four-armed, four-sleeved 'tracking bug', Walter Wireless.

There are three adventure games in the series:

- Spy Fox in: Dry Cereal (October 17, 1997)
- Spy Fox in: Some Assembly Required (September 28, 1999)
- Spy Fox in: Operation Ozone (May 1, 2001)

Two arcade games also exist starring Spy Fox:

- Spy Fox in: Cheese Chase (March 31, 1998)
- Spy Fox in: Hold the Mustard (October 19, 1999)

The Spy Fox games each contain several different game paths randomly determined when the player starts a new game. Each path has its own challenges, which some players find more challenging than others. The main protagonist of the games, Spy Fox, uses a variety of gadgets to complete his missions. The game allows for second chances on puzzles and tasks, and it is impossible to fail the overall mission. Each game has a bonus ending wherein the player can catch the villain. The bonus ending is accessible only if the player clicks an option at the right moment.

When running with ScummVM, these games can be played on different operating systems, including Windows, Mac and Linux. Nearly a decade after its initial release, Dry Cereal was ported to the Nintendo Wii in 2008, but its availability was significantly limited by legal problems concerning the port's development.

In 2014, the Spy Fox series was released on Steam, along with the entirety of the Humongous Entertainment game library.

Back in the early 2000s, Humongous published a number of promo materials for the games. These materials include stories featuring new villains that have never appeared in the game series, including Dr. Morrie Arty, Dr. Fu Manch Hugh, and Baron Von Bluefield.

== Availability ==
- For Steam the games were released individually, bundled together in the "Spy Fox Complete Pack" and packaged with all Humongous Entertainment games in the "Humongous Entertainment Complete Pack".
- Spy Fox in: Cheese Chase was released for Windows and Macintosh on a compilation CD titled "Super Duper Arcade 1", along with Pajama Sam's Sock Works, Freddi Fish and Luther's Water Worries and Putt-Putt and Pep's Balloon-o-Rama.
- Spy Fox in: Hold the Mustard was released for Windows and Macintosh on a compilation CD titled "Super Duper Arcade 2", along with Pajama Sam's Lost & Found, Freddi Fish and Luther's Maze Madness and Putt-Putt and Pep's Dog on a Stick.
- Humongous Entertainment released a CD titled "Humongous Entertainment Triple Treat 3", which included Spy Fox in: Cheese Chase, Freddi Fish 2: The Case of the Haunted Schoolhouse and Backyard Baseball.
- Encore Software released a compilation CD titled "Fun & Skills Pack 1st & 2nd Grade", which included Spy Fox in "Dry Cereal", Carmen Sandiego: Junior Detective and Crayola Magic 3D Coloring.
- Encore Software released a compilation CD titled "Fun & Skills Pack 1st & 2nd Grade 3.0", which included Spy Fox in "Dry Cereal", Schoolhouse Rock!, Carmen Sandiego: Junior Detective and Crayola Make a Masterpiece.
