= Freddi Fish 2: The Case of the Haunted Schoolhouse =

1996 video game

- Developer: Humongous Entertainment
- Publisher: Humongous Entertainment (Note: The DVD player version was published by Take-Two Interactive. The iOS and Android versions were published by Tommo. The Steam release was co-published by Tommo and Night Dive Studios.)
- Producer: Ron Gilbert
- Designers: Mark Peyser; Tami Borowick
- Composer: Tom McGurk
- Series: Freddi Fish
- Engine: SCUMM
- Platforms: Macintosh, Windows, DVD player, Linux, Android, iOS, Nintendo Switch, PlayStation 4
- Release: August 29, 1996: Macintosh, Windows August 29, 1996 DVD player 2005 Linux January 5, 2014 Android September 8, 2014 Switch, PlayStation 4 May 2, 2024
- Genre: Adventure
- Mode: Single-player

Freddi Fish 2: The Case of the Haunted Schoolhouse is a 1996 video game and the second installment in the Freddi Fish series, developed and published by Humongous Entertainment. It was followed by Freddi Fish 3: The Case of the Stolen Conch Shell in 1998.

The game was re-released on iOS under the title Freddi Fish Haunted Schoolhouse Mystery and on Android with a shortened title Freddi Fish: Haunted Schoolhouse in 2014. It was also released on the Nintendo Switch and PlayStation 4 in May 2024.

== Plot ==
On her way to school, Freddi Fish meets with Luther, who brings his Codfish Commando action figure for show and tell. Upon entering their classroom, Freddi and Luther learn from their teacher, Mrs. Croaker that their classmates saw a ghost, who stole their toys. The ghost then appears and steals Luther's action figure before fleeing. Freddi and Luther chase the ghost into the school's basement, where Luther retrieves his toy and the ghost vows revenge. Believing the ghost to be fake, Freddi conceives a Rube Goldberg trap to capture the ghost and the two set out to find five additional parts for the trap.

As Freddi and Luther progress further in their mission, Boss and Spongehead (the sharks from the first game) attempt to discourage the two from their mission by "warning" them of their fate. When Freddi and Luther are one part away from completing their trap, Boss and Spongehead meet with the Squidfather, who never had any toys in his youth and orders the sharks to bring him the guppies' toys at all costs.

Upon collecting all five items, Freddi and Luther set up their trap and use Luther's action figure as bait for the ghost. The trap works and the ghost is revealed to be Boss and Spongehead in disguise. After the sharks explain the Squidfather's situation, Luther decides to let the Squidfather keep his action figure, while he and Freddi give the rest of the toys back to the guppies. The class celebrates Freddi and Luther's heroism as the game ends.

== Gameplay ==
Freddi Fish 2 uses exactly the same mechanics as its predecessor, but contains newer puzzles, collectible and usable items, character encounters, locations, minigames and trivial click spots in the gameplay. The particular parts and pieces for the ghost trap are randomized in every new game.

== Development ==
Freddi Fish 2 was showcased at E3 1996.

Due to the common practice that adult women voice children of both genders, game designer Tami Borowick, who was behind the decision to make Freddi female during development of the first game, thought that players may not realize that Freddi was female and thus added a line in this game to clarify the character's true gender.

== Reception ==
Reception

Review scores
Publication	Score
The Electric Playground	9.5/10
PC Magazine	5/5
Unikgamer	7.5/10
MacUser	4/5

Award
Publication	Award
Game Developer's Choice Awards	1997 Spotlight Awards - Best Educational Game

Freddi Fish 2 was generally well-received, getting a 3-star rating from Allgame, 9.5 out of 10 from Electric Playground, 5 Stars from PC Magazine, and Unikgamer gave a 7.5 out 10 score. The Game Developer's Choice Awards awarded it as "Best Educational Game" in the 1997 Spotlight Awards. MacUser declared it one of 1996's top 50 CD-ROMs.
