= Freddi Fish 4: The Case of the Hogfish Rustlers of Briny Gulch =

1999 video game

- Cover art
- Developer: Humongous Entertainment
- Publisher: Humongous Entertainment (Note: The Steam release was co-published by Tommo and Night Dive Studios. The iOS release was published by Tommo.)
- Designers: Lisa Wick; Brad Carlton
- Artist: John Michaud (animator)
- Writer: Dave Grossman
- Composer: Thomas McGurk
- Series: Freddi Fish
- Engine: SCUMM
- Platforms: Macintosh, Windows, Linux, iOS, Nintendo Switch, PlayStation 4
- Release: March 30, 1999: Macintosh, Windows March 30, 1999 Linux May 29, 2014 iOS August 13, 2015 Switch, PlayStation 4 December 21, 2023
- Genre: Adventure
- Mode: Single-player

Freddi Fish 4: The Case of the Hogfish Rustlers of Briny Gulch is a 1999 video game and the fourth installment in the Freddi Fish series. It was developed and published by Humongous Entertainment. The game was ported to the Nintendo Switch and PlayStation 4 consoles on December 21, 2023. A sequel, Freddi Fish 5: The Case of the Creature of Coral Cove, was released in 2001.

== Plot ==
Freddi and Luther are invited by Freddi's cousin, Calico Catfish, to visit her hogfish ranch set in a western-themed town called "Briny Gulch". Upon arriving at the ranch, Freddi and Luther learn that Calico's hogfish herd was rustled. Since Briny Gulch's Sheriff Shrimp is absent, Freddi and Luther offer to find and capture the rustlers.

Freddi and Luther enter a bar, where they discover a note, which mentions a meeting at a shipwreck called the Rusty Rustler, as well as a lock combination in order to enter. Once Freddi and Luther arrive at the shipwreck and enter the combination, they meet one of the rustlers named Goby, who refuses to allow the two to pass as they lack the clothing to qualify as a rustler, prompting the duo to search for materials in order to disguise themselves as one. Meanwhile, another rustler named Moray struggles to take care of Calico's hogfish, who refuse to cooperate; he keeps threatening to call someone named "Mr. Big".

After obtaining the right kinds of clothing for their disguise, Freddi and Luther return to the Rusty Rustler, where they manage to fool Goby into allowing them to enter but are discovered by Moray, who locks them in a prison cell and calls Mr. Big to decide what to do with them. Freddi and Luther soon realize that their jail cell is just above the hogfish's cell, where they discover a clue to Mr. Big's identity and free the hogfish by attaching a chain and anchor to the window's handlebars. Afterwards, the townsfolk, led by the recently rescued Sheriff Shrimp, arrive at the Rusty Rustler, where Freddi exposes Mr. Big's identity. After Goby and Moray express their desire to be hogfish ranchers, Calico hires the two, along with Mr. Big, as assistant ranchers.

== Gameplay ==
Freddi Fish 4 uses the same principles as its predecessors, but similar to the third game, it has multiple endings on who the main culprit is based on evidence Freddi and Luther find. There are four possible suspects: Eight Finger Phil, Nelson Torso, Sahara Slim and Gill Barker (returning from the previous game), and each one has a different reason for stealing the hogfish.

== Reception ==
Reception

Review scores
Publication	Score
GameBlitz	85%
Gamer's Pulse	93%
Review Corner	4.5/5
Metzomagic	5/5
Unikgamer	6.5/10

Awards
Publication	Award
Review Corner	Award of Excellence
Canadian Toy Testing Council	Top-Rated Three Star Award
Family PC	Top Rated Award
Family Life	Critic's Choice Award
Choosing Children's Software	Best Picks for the Holidays Award
Parent's Guide to Children's Media	Click of a Mouse: Software Award
Children's Software Revue	All Star Software Award

Freddi Fish 4: The Case of the Hogfish Rustlers of Briny Gulch was generally well-received, getting scores of 85% from GameBlitz, 93% from Gamer's Pulse, 4.5 out of 5 stars from Review Corner, 4.5 out of 5 stars from Metzomagic and Unikgamer gave a 6.5 out 10 score. Review Corner also gave this game the Award of Excellence.

Larry Blasko of the Associated Press praised the "movie-quality art and animation", music, sense of humor, minigames, and the simplicity of its user interface. He also appreciated the fact that it ran from a single CD-ROM. Kurt Rogahn of The Gazette wrote that many of the game's puzzles were quite involved for the game's intended demographic, sometimes necessitating adult supervision, but wrote that the game being "quite enjoyable" from an adult perspective made this a non-issue. Pam Gleichman of The Orange County Register rated the game four stars out of four while noting that the puzzles held more attention than the main game. Jinny Gudmundsen of The Los Angeles Times called it "top-quality software" that had enhanced replay value because of the branching storylines.

During the year 2001 alone, Freddi Fish 4 sold 65,106 retail units in North America, according to PC Data.
