= Crayola Make a Masterpiece =

- Developer: IBM
- Release: 1998
- Operating system: Windows; Macintosh

Crayola Make a Masterpiece is a software art program from IBM for Windows and Macintosh. It is similar to Kid Pix.

== Summary ==
Crayola Make a Masterpiece lets users play with virtual markers, oil paints, even food. Paintings can be printed and saved, or annihilated. Paintings that are saved are hung in the program's gallery.

== Reception ==
MacHome Journal recommended Crayola Make a Masterpiece to any kid with an interest in art. Kids Domain called Crayola Make a Masterpiece a spectacular program. Macworld gave Crayola Make a Masterpiece a score of 3.5 out of 5.
