= Yonder: The Cloud Catcher Chronicles =

2017 video game

- Developer: Prideful Sloth
- Publishers: WW: Prideful Sloth; WW: Merge Games (Physical); JP: Nippon Ichi Software (Physical)
- Designer: Cheryl Vance
- Engine: Unity
- Platforms: PlayStation 4 PlayStation 5 Microsoft Windows; Nintendo Switch; Xbox One; Xbox Series X/S
- Release: PlayStation 4, Microsoft Windows; 18 July 2017; Nintendo Switch; 17 May 2018; Xbox One; 27 February 2019; PlayStation 5; 27 July 2021; Xbox Series X/S; 5 August 2021
- Genre: Adventure
- Mode: Single-player

Yonder: The Cloud Catcher Chronicles is an adventure video game developed and published by Prideful Sloth for PlayStation 4 and Windows. It was released on 18 July 2017. On 17 May 2018 a Nintendo Switch port was released on the Nintendo eShop, with a physical version releasing on 12 June 2018 published by Merge Games. The game was later ported to PlayStation 5 on 27 July 2021 and Xbox Series X and Series S on 5 August 2021.

== Gameplay ==
Yonder: The Cloud Catcher Chronicles is an adventure game set in an open world environment and played from a third-person perspective. A primary goal of the game is seek and collect magical creatures, known as sprites, to banish an ominous shroud known as the Murk. Throughout the adventure, the player can take part in activities like farming, fishing, and crafting while exploring the island.

The game takes place on an island that features eight distinct biomes, such as tropical beaches or snowy mountains. As times passes in the game, the world's seasons change. It also features a dynamic weather system and day-night cycle. The player character is customisable.

== Premise ==
The player character is shipwrecked on a magical island called Gemea. A mysterious, dark fog known as the Murk is polluting the environment and causing distress to the island's inhabitants. Now it is up to the player to restore the island by finding sprites to dispel the Murk.

== Development ==
Yonder: The Cloud Catcher Chronicles was developed by Australian indie video game studio Prideful Sloth. It is the team's debut game, although their staff is composed of industry veterans. Lead designer Cheryl Vance mentioned that aspects from games like Harvest Moon, Animal Crossing, The Legend of Zelda, and The Elder Scrolls V: Skyrim were key influences in the design of Yonder.

The game was released for PlayStation 4 and Windows on 18 July 2017. Publisher Merge Games has announced that an Enhanced Edition of the game will be released on the PlayStation 5 in May 2021.

== Reception ==
Reception

Aggregate score
Aggregator	Score
Metacritic	PC: 70/100; PS4: 64/100; NS: 74/100; XONE: 78/100

Review scores
Publication	Score
Destructoid	8/10
GameSpot	6/10
Nintendo Life	6/10
Nintendo World Report	8/10
Polygon	7/10
Push Square	7/10
RPGamer	3.5/5
VentureBeat	75/100

Yonder: The Cloud Catcher Chronicles received "mixed or average" reviews from critics, according to review aggregator Metacritic. It was nominated for "Best Game Audio Article, Publication or Broadcast" with "Yonder: The Cloud Catcher Chronicles: An Audio Development blog in two parts" at the 16th Annual Game Audio Network Guild Awards, and for "Family & Kids" at the 2018 Webby Awards.
