= Spy Fox in "Dry Cereal" =

1997 video game

- CD cover art
- Developer: Humongous Entertainment (Note: Ported to Wii by Mistic Software and iOS by Nimbus Games.)
- Publisher: Humongous Entertainment (Note: The Wii version was published by Majesco in the United States and Atari Europe in Europe. The iOS release was published by Atari. The iOS re-release and Android version were published by Tommo. The Steam release was co-published by Tommo and Night Dive Studios. The Nintendo Switch version was published by UFO Interactive Games.)
- Designers: Brad Carlton; Lisa Wick
- Composers: Julian Soule; Geoff Kirk
- Series: Spy Fox
- Engine: SCUMM
- Platforms: Mac OS, Windows, Wii, iOS, Android, Linux, Nintendo Switch, PlayStation 4
- Release: October 17, 1997: Windows, Macintosh; WW: October 17, 1997 Wii; NA: August 29, 2008 iOS; WW: May 4, 2012 Android; WW: April 1, 2014 Linux; WW: April 17, 2014 Nintendo Switch; WW: February 10, 2022 PlayStation 4; WW: November 3, 2022
- Genre: Adventure
- Mode: Single-player

Spy Fox in "Dry Cereal" is an adventure game developed and published by Humongous Entertainment as part of their Junior Adventure line and the first entry in the Spy Fox series of games. It follows the heroic Spy Fox as he attempts to stop a supervillain from stealing the world's dairy milk supply.

The game was released for PC in October 1997 to positive reviews and was ported to several other systems over the following decades.

== Gameplay ==
The game retains the easy-to-use format of the other Humongous Entertainment computer games, but unlike the others, this game introduces talk balloons, which enable Spy Fox to ask any character a specific question instead of simply having an ordinary conversation. There are also special kinds of items called "Spy Gadgets" (made and supplied by Professor Quack), which help Spy Fox solve certain puzzles. The game has multiple narratives; the story branches into a small number of threads midway through the game, and which thread the story follows is randomly selected each playthrough.

== Plot ==
On board an airplane over the Mediterranean Sea, Spy Corps agent Spy Fox is contacted by his assistant Monkey Penny, who informs him that the world's supply of dairy milk has mysteriously vanished, with the only clue being a piece of feta cheese traced to the island of Acidophilus in Greece. Spy Fox soon lands on the island, where he meets with Monkey Penny and scientist Professor Quack in their Mobile Command Center. Monkey Penny tasks Spy Fox with finding Howard Hugh Heifer Udderly III, the missing president and CEO of Amalgamated Moo Juice Inc., who they believe is connected to the milk disappearances.

Spy Fox finds Mr. Udderly tied up over a pool of piranhas in a feta factory and rescues him. In the Mobile Command Center, Udderly explains that William the Kid, the CEO of the Nectar of the Goats (N.O.G.) Corporation, has kidnapped all the dairy cows in the world and gathered all the dairy milk into a giant milk carton called the Milky Weapon of Destruction, planning to flood the capital with it and frame the cows so he can take control of the dairy world with his goat by-products. Udderly also reveals an access code to the weapon's deactivator, which he had previously swallowed while being held captive, prompting Spy Fox to use an "X-Ray Gum" gadget to see the code inside Udderly's stomach.

While exploring Acidophilus, Spy Fox discovers a ship called the S.S. Deadweight, where a party is being hosted. After forging an invitation to get aboard the ship, Spy Fox meets Russian Blue, the boat's owner. Monkey Penny later informs Spy Fox that Russian Blue is N.O.G.'s head of public relations and tells him to keep an eye on her. Using information obtained from Russian Blue and the S.S. Deadweight, Spy Fox locates Kid's fortress, infiltrating it by disguising himself using a spare N.O.G. jumpsuit.

Shortly after entering the fortress, Spy Fox witnesses William the Kid giving Russian Blue a missing part to the Milky Weapon's deactivator and ordering her to hide it somewhere safe. After Spy Fox finds and uses the missing piece to disarm the Milky Weapon of Destruction, William the Kid discovers Spy Fox's presence in the fortress and spitefully decides to drown the dairy cows in milk. Due to Kid's carelessness, Spy Fox locates his secret passageway to the cows' holding pen and frees them before watching William the Kid escape in a blimp. Later, Spy Fox is publicly awarded by the President for his heroics.

In an alternate ending, Spy Fox manages to sneak onto Kid's blimp, where he calls Monkey Penny, who gives him the coordinates to a mobile jail for William the Kid to land in. After Spy Fox sets the coordinates and primes Kid's ejection seat, the blimp changes course and Kid is launched in prison, thus defeating the villain for good.

== Release ==
The game was initially released for Windows and Macintosh computers in October 1997 and featured an alternate voice cast in the game's European release. Following the purchase of Humongous by Atari, the game was ported to the Wii in 2008, using the Wii Remote for point-and-click controls. It was available for a limited time due to legal problems concerning the port's development. In 2012, Nimbus Games Inc. released a version designed for both iOS and Android. A Nintendo Switch version was released in February 2022, followed by a PlayStation 4 version in November of that same year.

== Reception ==
Reception

Review scores
Publication	Score
Adventure Gamers	4/5 (PC)
AllGame	4.5/5
IGN	5.5/10 (Wii)

Spy Fox in "Dry Cereal" has sold two million copies and received 20 Awards of Excellence. Adventure Gamers gave the game a 4-star rating, while Allgame gave it a 4.5-star rating. The Wii version was less well-received, with IGN giving the port a score of 5.5/10.
