= Putt-Putt Saves the Zoo =

1995 point-and-click adventure game

- Windows and Mac cover art showing Putt-Putt and Pep along with several of the Cartown Zoo's animals
- Developer: Humongous Entertainment (Note: Ported to iOS and Android by Nimbus Games.)
- Publisher: Humongous Entertainment (Note: The 2005 Europe-exclusive DVD player release was published by Take-Two Interactive. The 2011/2012 iOS/Android release was published by Atari, while the 2015 iOS release was published by Tommo. The Steam release was co-published by Tommo and Night Dive Studios. The Nintendo Switch version was published by UFO Interactive Games.)
- Producer: Ron Gilbert
- Designers: Ron Gilbert; Bret Barrett; Brad Carlton
- Artist: Todd Lubsen
- Writers: Laurie Bauman Arnold; Annie Fox
- Composer: George Alistair Sanger
- Series: Putt-Putt
- Engine: SCUMM
- Platforms: Android, Macintosh, Windows, DVD player, Linux, Nintendo Switch, PlayStation 4
- Release: August 10, 1995: Windows August 10, 1995 Macintosh October 18, 1995 DVD player 2005 iOS November 15, 2011 Android 2012 Linux July 3, 2014 Switch February 10, 2022 PlayStation 4 November 3, 2022
- Genre: Adventure
- Mode: Single-player

Putt-Putt Saves the Zoo is a 1995 children's point-and-click adventure developed and published by Humongous Entertainment. In the game, Putt-Putt must rescue six baby animals which have gone missing from the new Cartown Zoo.

The game is the third entry in the Putt-Putt series, being preceded by Putt-Putt Goes to the Moon in 1993 and followed by Putt-Putt Travels Through Time in 1997. It is the first game in the series to utilize hand-drawn animation for its graphics.

The game was released on August 10, 1995 for Microsoft Windows and Apple Macintosh. It has since been re-released on Steam and ported to Linux, iOS, Android, Nintendo Switch, and PlayStation 4.

== Plot ==
Putt-Putt is excited for the grand opening of the Cartown Zoo. He visits Mr. Baldini's grocery store, who tasks him with delivering zoo chow to zookeeper Outback Al. Upon arriving at the zoo, Putt-Putt learns that six baby animals have gone missing: Baby Jambo the African bush elephant calf; Masai the reticulated giraffe calf; Kenya the lion cub; Zanzibar the hippopotamus calf; Sammy the Antarctic fur seal; and Little Skeeter the boa constrictor. Putt-Putt volunteers to search for the animals, which Outback Al agrees to as he starts repairs on the zoo.

After finding and rescuing all six baby animals, Putt-Putt notifies Outback Al of his success, and the Outback Al excitedly thanks him. At the zoo's opening ceremony, Outback Al gives Putt-Putt a Junior Zookeeper award for his help and allows him the honor of cutting the ribbon. The zoo is then opened to everyone as they all enter to explore, ending the game.

== Gameplay ==
The game mechanics are almost the same as its predecessors including the glove box inventory, horn, radio and accelerator, though one addition is an ignition key shown on the bottom left side of Putt-Putt's dashboard, which allows the player to quit the game. A few mini games are also playable. Unlike other games, Putt-Putt can acquire a camera so the player can take pictures of the animals and other characters and print them out.

== Reception ==
The combined sales of Putt-Putt Saves the Zoo, Putt-Putt Joins the Parade and Putt-Putt Goes to the Moon surpassed one million units by June 1997. During the year 2001 alone, Putt-Putt Saves the Zoo sold 100,972 retail units in North America, according to PC Data.
