= Freddi Fish 3: The Case of the Stolen Conch Shell =

1998 video game

- Cover art
- Developer: Humongous Entertainment
- Publisher: Humongous Entertainment (Note: The 2012 iOS release was published by Atari. The iOS re-release and Android version were published by Tommo. The Steam release was co-published by Tommo and Night Dive Studios. The Nintendo Switch version was published by UFO Interactive Games.)
- Designers: Edward Pun; Tami Caryl Borowick
- Artist: John Michaud (animator)
- Writer: Fred Kron
- Composer: Thomas McGurk
- Series: Freddi Fish
- Engine: SCUMM
- Platforms: Macintosh, Windows, Linux, Android, iOS, Nintendo Switch, PlayStation 4
- Release: March 1, 1998: Macintosh, Windows March 1, 1998 iOS January 12, 2012 Android April 3, 2014 Linux May 15, 2014 Switch January 3, 2022 PlayStation 4 November 2, 2022
- Genre: Adventure
- Mode: Single-player

Freddi Fish 3: The Case of the Stolen Conch Shell is a 1998 video game and the third installment in the Freddi Fish series, developed and published by Humongous Entertainment. The game was followed by Freddi Fish 4: The Case of the Hogfish Rustlers of Briny Gulch in 1999.

An iOS version was released with a shortened title Freddi Fish & the Stolen Shell and also released with a "Lite" demo version that featured subtitles and text boxes in the gameplay. It was considered one of Atari's capital projects available on its website and on the App Store. A Nintendo Switch version, along with Putt-Putt Travels Through Time, was released in January 2022, followed by the PlayStation 4 version on the PlayStation Store in November.

== Plot ==
On summer vacation, Pelican Sam takes Freddi and Luther on a trip to the Founder's Day Festival in the Hawaiian sea, where Luther's Uncle Blenny is the keeper of the Conch Shell that commences the celebration. Upon arrival, however, Luther and Freddi are shocked to find Uncle Blenny in jail. Blenny explains that the conch shell has been stolen and he has been wrongly blamed for the theft. Freddi and Luther further learn from Blenny that six of the festival's attendees were nearby when the crime occurred and if they find the three scattered golden pipes that had fallen out of the shell, his dogfish, Old Soggy, may be able to pick up the thief's scent.

Once all three of the pipes are found, Freddi and Luther give them to Old Soggy, who leads the two to an Aztec temple. While in the temple, Freddi spots the conch thief sneaking out and Old Soggy swims off to catch them. During this, Luther takes interest in a jewel and grabs it, which sets off a booby trap that locks the temple's gate and imprisons Luther in a cage. At Freddi's insistence, Old Soggy continues after the thief, while the former searches throughout the temple in order to find the cage's key to free Luther.

After Freddi frees Luther from the cage and the latter puts the jewel back in place, the two discover a bag that the thief dropped and after peeking inside it, they return to the festival, where the townspeople have formed an angry mob to confront Uncle Blenny. Freddi reveals she and Luther found an item inside the bag which exposes the real conch thief, who confesses after Old Soggy bites them from behind. Uncle Blenny is then released from prison and has his title of "Grand Exalted Keeper of the Conch" reinstated as he blows out the signal for the festival to begin. The thief is then charged for their crimes with a comical punishment.

== Gameplay ==
Freddi Fish 3 uses exactly the same mechanics as its predecessors. In each playthrough, the puzzles, collectible and usable items, character encounters, locations, minigames, and trivial click spots change to randomly determine which of the six suspects stole the Conch Shell; the six possible suspects are Gill Barker, Claw, Nadine, Rosie Pearl, Pierre, and Horst Fedders.

== Development ==
Development for the game began around April 1996. All puzzles were drafted by the development team on notebooks and minigames for the carnival were sketched. While programming the game, programmers used pseudo-code to keep track of their work.

The characters were designed from basic descriptions with 10 till 30 sketches drawn until a final sketch was approved. The longest process in the character animation was adding bubble trails to their movement. During the storyboard process it took from 15 to 30 sketches to design each scene in the game. Backgrounds were penciled, inked and hand painted. Some of those backgrounds were inspired by scenery photographs. To find the right voices for the characters, dozens of actors auditioned for the game.

== Reception ==
Reception

Review scores
Publication	Score
GameBlitz	85%
About this Particular Macintosh	Excellent
Unikgamer	5.5/10

Freddi Fish 3 was generally well-received, getting scores of 85% from GameBlitz, a 4-star rating from Allgame, an Excellent rating from About this Particular Macintosh, and a 5.5 out 10 score from Unikgamer.
