= Putt-Putt Joins the Parade =

1992 point-and-click adventure game

- Windows / Macintosh cover art featuring Putt-Putt and Pep (both foreground) and Smokey (background)
- Developer: Humongous Entertainment
- Publisher: Humongous Entertainment (Note: The 3DO version was published by Marubeni. The Steam release was co-published by Tommo and Night Dive Studios.)
- Director: Ron Gilbert
- Designers: Laurie Rose Bauman; Annie Fox; Ron Gilbert; Shelley Day
- Writers: Laurie Rose Bauman; Annie Fox
- Composer: Tom McMail
- Series: Putt-Putt
- Engine: SCUMM
- Platforms: MS-DOS, 3DO, Macintosh, Windows, Linux, Steam
- Release: November 6, 1992: MS-DOS November 6, 1992 3DO 1993 Macintosh, Windows 1995 Linux, Steam April 17, 2014
- Genre: Adventure
- Mode: Single-player

Putt-Putt Joins the Parade is a 1992 children's point-and-click adventure game developed and published by Humongous Entertainment under its Junior Adventures label. In the game, the player must help Putt-Putt, an anthropomorphized car, enter the Cartown Pet Parade by obtaining a balloon, paying for a car wash or paint job, and finding a pet dog, which Putt-Putt names Pep.

Putt-Putt Joins the Parade was the first game developed by Humongous Entertainment. It was also the first game in the seven-game Putt-Putt series, being followed by Putt-Putt Goes to the Moon the following year.

Originally released on November 6, 1992 for MS-DOS, the game has since been ported to the 3DO, Microsoft Windows, Macintosh OS, Linux, iOS, and Android. In 2014, the game was re-released on Steam.

== Plot ==
On a sunny morning in Cartown, Putt-Putt turns on his radio and hears an announcement about a pet parade event. Though excited at this news, Putt-Putt acknowledges that he doesn't have a pet and thus wouldn't qualify to participate. He meets with the parade's manager, Smokey, who encourages him to find a pet and a balloon for the parade as well as a car wash in order to enter the parade.

During his mission, Putt-Putt finds and befriends a stray dog by giving him a bone and names him "Pep". After Putt-Putt does all the tasks he needed to do, Smokey signs him up for the parade and even lets him lead in it. The cars in the parade all drive off as the sun sets and the credits roll.

== Gameplay ==
Putt-Putt Joins the Parade plays like a typical point-and-click adventure game with the player moving Putt-Putt from one location to the next, picking up items and using them with mouse clicks. Putt-Putt places collected items in his glove box, which serves as a simple heads-up display. In the 3DO version, the on-screen pointing cursor is moved with the D-pad and a button is used to click on what the cursor is pointing at.

== Release ==
After the game's creation, Humongous Entertainment had intended to get Electronic Arts to distribute the product, invoking a lawsuit from LucasArts over the ownership of the SCUMM game engine and disruption from press release.

When a demo of the game was completed, it was uploaded to CompuServe. It took time before a single user downloaded the game, then gave a lengthy review which gave a steady increase in audience.

== Reception ==
Reception

Review scores
Publication	Score
Adventure Gamers	2.5/5
Electronic Gaming Monthly	7/10, 7/10, 7/10, 8/10 (3DO)
MacUser	5/5

In 1997, a study conducted by the University of Texas at Austin compared children's reception of educational games with their professionally assigned developmentally appropriate practice (DAP) ratings. Of the thirteen programs selected, Putt-Putt Joins the Parade ranked as the most frequently played game.
