= Hong Kong Mahjong Pro =

1992 video game

- Developer: Nine Dragons Software
- Publisher: Electronic Arts, Inc.
- Platforms: MS-DOS; Windows; Windows 3.x
- Release: 1992
- Genre: Mahjong video game

Hong Kong Mahjong Pro is a 1992 video game published by Electronic Arts.

== Gameplay ==
Hong Kong Mahjong Pro is a game in which the Mahjong rules and tile set from Hong Kong are used. The game makes use of tile graphics and a single-screen table game. The player chooses 3 computer opponents, from 12 available opponents with increasingly challenging skills and distinct play styles.

== Reception ==
Reception

Review score
Publication	Score
VideoGames & Computer Entertainment	8/10

Scorpia reviewed the game for Computer Gaming World, and stated that "If one has ever wanted to learn Mahjong, or one already is a Mahjong player with no local opponents, this game is well worth looking into. While nothing can beat sitting down with three live opponents, Hong Kong Mahjong Pro is the next best thing to it."

Lisa Armstrong for Video Games & Computer Entertainment said that "For those who already know the game of mahjong or are patient enough to learn its complex subtleties, Hong Kong Mahjong Pro offers an abundance of challenging and authentic game combinations.

Alfred C. Giovetti for Compute! complimented how the game would "make it very easy for a beginner to learn this complex game without embar- rassment" and stated that "Mahjong players in search of opponents will find this game a godsend."
