= Grand Prix Circuit (video game) =

1988 video game

- Developers: Distinctive Software; Random Access (CPC, Spectrum)
- Publisher: Accolade
- Producer: Shelley Day
- Designers: Brad Gour; Don Mattrick
- Programmers: Frank Barchard; Rick Friesen; Brad Gour; Amory Wong
- Artists: John Boechler; Tony Lee
- Composer: Krisjan Hatlelid
- Platforms: Amiga, Amstrad CPC, Apple IIGS, Commodore 64, Macintosh, MS-DOS, ZX Spectrum
- Release: NA: 1988; EU: 1988
- Genre: Racing
- Mode: Single-player

Grand Prix Circuit is a racing video game developed by Distinctive Software and published by Accolade for MS-DOS compatible operating systems in 1988. It was ported to the Amiga, Amstrad CPC, Apple IIGS, Commodore 64, and ZX Spectrum.

== Gameplay ==
Qualification screenshot

Players can choose from three different cars in the game. They are:

1. McLaren MP4/4 (Honda 1.5L V6 turbo - 790 bhp (589 kW; 801 PS))
2. Williams FW12C (Renault 3.5L V10 - 735 bhp (548 kW; 745 PS))
3. Ferrari F1/87/88C (Ferrari 3.5L V12 - 680 bhp (507 kW; 689 PS))

The McLaren-Honda turbo is the most powerful car in the game but is also the most difficult car to control. This is the 1988 combination that won 15 out of 16 Grands Prix (along with 15 pole positions) in the hands of Ayrton Senna and Alain Prost.

The Williams-Renault is the next most powerful and the car is relatively neutral to control. It is the 1989 combination. The FW12C was driven by Thierry Boutsen and Riccardo Patrese in 1989.

The Ferrari is actually the 1988 turbo car's chassis with the V12 engine. This version did appear in public in 1988, but only as the test mule for Ferrari's 1989 engine and revolutionary semi-automatic transmission and was never raced. As the slowest of the three the Ferrari is also the easiest to control. The test car was driven by the team's 1988 drivers Michele Alboreto and Gerhard Berger, as well as Ferrari test driver Roberto Moreno.

There are five difficulty levels and three playing modes: practice, single event and championship circuit and the game is accompanied by music written for the Commodore 64 by Kris Hatlelid. The high score/end of game music is based on "Na Na Hey Hey Kiss Him Goodbye" from 1969 by Paul Leka, Gary DeCarlo and Dale Frashuer.

== Reception ==
A Computer Gaming World review had mixed feelings about the game, noting the controls, which governed steering, acceleration, and shifting all at the same time, took so long to get used to that the reviewer ended up asking a friend to do shifting for him. The review did note the game was quite good after getting used to the controls.

By 1991, the game had sold 100,000 units.
