= Putt-Putt Travels Through Time =

1997 point-and-click adventure game

- Developer: Humongous Entertainment
- Publisher: Humongous Entertainment (Note: The 2012/2013 iOS/Android release was published by Atari, while the re-release was published by Tommo. The Steam release was co-published by Tommo and Nightdive Studios. The Nintendo Switch and Playstation 4 versions were published by UFO Interactive Games.)
- Producer: Ron Gilbert
- Designers: Brad Carlton; Bret Barrett; Matthew Mahon; Nick Mirkovich
- Writer: Laurie Rose Bauman
- Composer: Jeremy Soule
- Series: Putt-Putt
- Engine: SCUMM
- Platforms: Android, Macintosh, Windows, iOS, Linux, Nintendo Switch, PlayStation 4
- Release: June 1, 1997: Macintosh, Windows June 1, 1997 iOS August 14, 2012 Android October 4, 2013 Linux May 15, 2014 Switch January 3, 2022 PlayStation 4 November 3, 2022
- Genre: Adventure
- Mode: Single-player

Putt-Putt Travels Through Time is a 1997 children's point-and-click adventure game developed and published by Humongous Entertainment under its Junior Adventures label. In the game, Putt-Putt must recover four items, including his pet dog Pep, that were scattered across history by a malfunctioning time portal.

The game is the fourth installment in the Putt-Putt series, being preceded by Putt-Putt Saves the Zoo in 1995 and followed by Putt-Putt Enters the Race in 1999.

Originally released on June 1, 1997 for Microsoft Windows and Macintosh OS, the game has been re-released and ported several times. In 2014, the PC version was re-released on Steam, and the game was ported to Linux, iOS, and Android. In January 2022, a port was released on the Nintendo Switch, followed by a PlayStation 4 version in November.

== Plot ==
Putt-Putt visits Mr. Firebird's laboratory with the intention of showing him his new school supplies: a lunchbox, a calculator, and a history report. At the lab, Mr. Firebird demonstrates a machine made to view different time periods like a television. The demonstration turns chaotic, however, when the machine opens a portal that sucks Putt-Putt's items, as well as his dog Pep, into four different time periods: the Stone Age, the medieval period, the Old West, and the distant future. Mr. Firebird can't shut down the portal until everything is brought back to the present time, so Putt-Putt enters the portal to search for the missing items.

The locations where the items are placed vary between playthroughs, but some story actions are required in all playthroughs to unlock certain areas. In the Stone Age, Putt-Putt meets the cars' primitive ancestor, Wheel, and must help him build a bridge over a tar pit. In the medieval period, Putt-Putt helps Princess Chassis, a carriage, repair her friend Woodward and de-rust the castle gates. In the Old West, Putt-Putt is hired as a conductor and fixes Tobias "Toby" T. Train. Additionally, if any item other than Pep is placed in the future, it will be located in a museum, requiring Putt-Putt to exchange it with another artifact of similar purpose (e.g., trading an abacus for his calculator).

After finding every item, Putt-Putt returns to the laboratory and Mr. Firebird locks up the portal to prevent any more chaos. Putt-Putt leaves for school, promising to show his school supplies to Mr. Firebird later. At his classroom, Putt-Putt turns in his report and tells everyone what he learned while time travelling as the credits roll.

== Gameplay ==
Like previous Putt-Putt games, the game features a head-up display styled after Putt-Putt's dashboard, featuring a steering wheel, horn, radio, speedometer, and fuel gauge, as well as a glove box holding Putt-Putt's inventory and a key fob used to quit the game. Most of these features are not used in gameplay, though they are interactive: for example, the radio will tune to a station matching the current time period if selected.

Completing the game requires finding four items: a calculator, a lunchbox, a history report, and Putt-Putt's dog Pep. One item is placed in each time period, but the time period corresponding to each item is selected randomly in each playthrough. Additionally, some puzzles have randomized elements; for example, the rock needed to finish a bridge in the Stone Age can be one of four shapes, each found in different locations.

The game contains several minigames spread throughout the different eras, such as a volcano-themed "Simon Says" game in the Stone Age and a 3-D paddle ball game in the future. Depending on the playthrough, completing a minigame may be required to find the missing items.

== Development ==
Concept art for Merlin the Medieval Sorcerer, a new character in the game. Artists played around with designs and colours until settling on the finished version as he appears in the game (bottom).

The production team brainstormed ideas for the follow-up title in the Putt-Putt franchise. Among the alternate titles were: Putt-Putt Goes to the Carnival, Putt-Putt Saves the Universe, and Putt-Putt Learns to Fly. They eventually settled on Putt-Putt Travels Through Time. While the designs of the main characters were already established, the team had to work on designing to look of new characters such as Merlin the Medieval Sorcerer. The scripts was written and storyboards were created to layout how each scene would work as a self-contained piece, as well as part of a larger story. Background artists then interpreted both the script and storyboards to create the look and feel of the game through the backgrounds; part of their job was to leave sufficient space for clickable hotspots. Once the basic design sketch was approved, it was given more detail and finally painted. Next, animators created series of drawings based on the storyboards which when viewed together would simulate movement; each of the 30,000 drawings were then individually scanned into a computer, where they were cleaned up and had imperfections removed. The next stage was for artists to colour frames and animate clickpoints; Humongous noted that while this stage was "tedious", it allowed low-level artists to be creative and use their initiative. The work was handed over to programmers who wrote code to ensure the game responded to player choices, and who added sound effects to synch up to the animations. The music was created by Humongous, while voice actors were auditioned by the company (if new to the franchise), then sent to a studio to record their lines.

Putt Putt game designer Nick Mirkovich commented that there was a design philosophy of creating immersive interactive world for players to explore, and that like other games by Humongous, items needed for game completion were programmed to be in different places for separate playthroughs. Players could go behind the scenes into the game's production via the company website.

== Reception ==
Reception

Review scores
Publication	Score
Metzomagic	4.5/5
Greenman Gaming	52%
The Electric Playground	8/10
Macworld	4/5 / 8.7/10

Award
Publication	Award
Macworld	Best Kids Game (1998)

Computer Shopper felt the game was fun, but ultimately failed to live up to predecessors of the genre. The Cincinnati Post deemed the game "outstanding", and recommended that younger children purchase an earlier title in the Putt-Putt series first to acquaint themselves with computers before attempting this more "challenging" title. The Boston Herald gave the game a rating of 4.5 stars, praising the abundance of clickable hotspots in every scene which would keep kids entertained while completing the adventure. The newspaper also deemed the game one of the "finest kid titles ever". Rocky Mountain News gave it a B, commenting that it lived up to the quality standard of Humongous Entertainment. The Washington Times wrote that the game was "delightful" and "uncomplicated". Macworld rated the game 8.7 out of 10 and inducted it into its 1998 Game Hall of Fame in the Kids category, saying that while the point was "to encourage junior adventurers to master the reasoning and problem-solving skills necessary to complete the task [...] the bottom line is fun, and as in grown-up adventures, the journey itself is the reward".

In the fourth quarter of 1997, the game was the 4th biggest seller in the PC Kids/Edutainment category.
