= Freddi Fish 5: The Case of the Creature of Coral Cove =

2001 video game

- Developer: Humongous Entertainment
- Publisher: Infogrames (Note: The Steam release was co-published by Tommo and Night Dive Studios. The iOS version was published by Tommo.)
- Producers: Tanya Erwin; Rachel Frost
- Designer: Brad Carlton
- Artist: John Michaud (animator)
- Writer: Julia Hill
- Composer: Nathan Rosenberg
- Series: Freddi Fish
- Engine: SCUMM
- Platforms: Macintosh, Windows, Linux, iOS, Nintendo Switch, PlayStation 4
- Release: June 19, 2001: Macintosh, Windows June 19, 2001 Linux June 6, 2014 iOS August 13, 2015 Switch, PlayStation 4 May 2, 2024
- Genre: Adventure
- Mode: Single-player

Freddi Fish 5: The Case of the Creature of Coral Cove is a 2001 video game and the fifth and final installment in the Freddi Fish series of adventure games. It was developed by Humongous Entertainment and published by Infogrames.

== Plot ==
Freddi and Luther are about to visit a newly opened tourist attraction called Coral Cove Park, only to realize that it has been shut down due to sea monster sightings, much to the fury of the Coral Cove citizens and the park's developer, Marty Sardini. Freddi offers for her and Luther to find out why the sea monster is terrorizing everyone, which Marty reluctantly agrees to. With permission from Coral Cove's Mayor Marlin, Freddi and Luther enter Coral Cove Park to look for clues.

In the park, Freddi and Luther discover a piece of food that was partially eaten and theorize that the sea monster was eating it at some point. The two then meet with their scientist friend, Casey, who analyzes the food sample and confirms it to be a kind of sea cheese that is found in Tetra Caves; he also shows Freddi and Luther a key with traces of the same food on it, which the two use to unlock the door to Tetra Caves.

Once inside the cave, Freddi discovers a to-do list that the monster had. After enlisting the help of Coral Cove citizens in finding more clues, Freddi and Luther head over to the deepest crevice in the ocean, where they meet the sea monster named Xamfear, who claims that Coral Cove Park is actually his home, and that Marty illegally drove him out to open it as an attraction. Marty denies this claim before surreptitiously fleeing to his home when Xamfear is unable to find his deed to prove that he owns the cove.

Now suspicious of Marty's actions, Freddi and Luther sneak into his home, where they discover Xamfear's deed hidden behind a picture frame. They expose Marty's wrongdoings to the townsfolk, clearing Xamfear's name. Marty is subsequently sentenced to community service, while Xamfear reobtains the rights to Coral Cove Park and decides for it to remain an attraction, much to everyone's delight.

== Gameplay ==
Freddi Fish 5 uses the same principles as its predecessors, but the puzzles and sequences are straightforward as there are no multiple endings and choices like the previous two games. Uncommon to other Junior Adventure games, there is also a long, side-scrolling screen used to represent a town in the middle of the game world, with different buildings and characters to visit.

== Reception ==
Reception

Review scores
Publication	Score
MacHome	5/5
Review Corner	4.5/5
Metzomagic	5/5

Awards
Publication	Award
Review Corner	Award of Excellence
Parents' Choice Award	Silver Honor
Children's Software Revue	All Star Award
National Parenting Publication Awards	Gold Award
Choosing Children's Software	"Best Pick" Award

During 2001, Freddi Fish 5 sold 119,739 retail units in North America alone, according to PC Data.

Freddi Fish 5: The Case of the Creature of Coral Cove was generally well-received, getting a 4-star rating from Allgame, 5 stars from MacHome, 4.5 stars from Review Corner, and 5 stars from Metzomagic. Review Corner also gave this game the Award of Excellence.
