= Shelley Day =

Video game designer (born 1957)

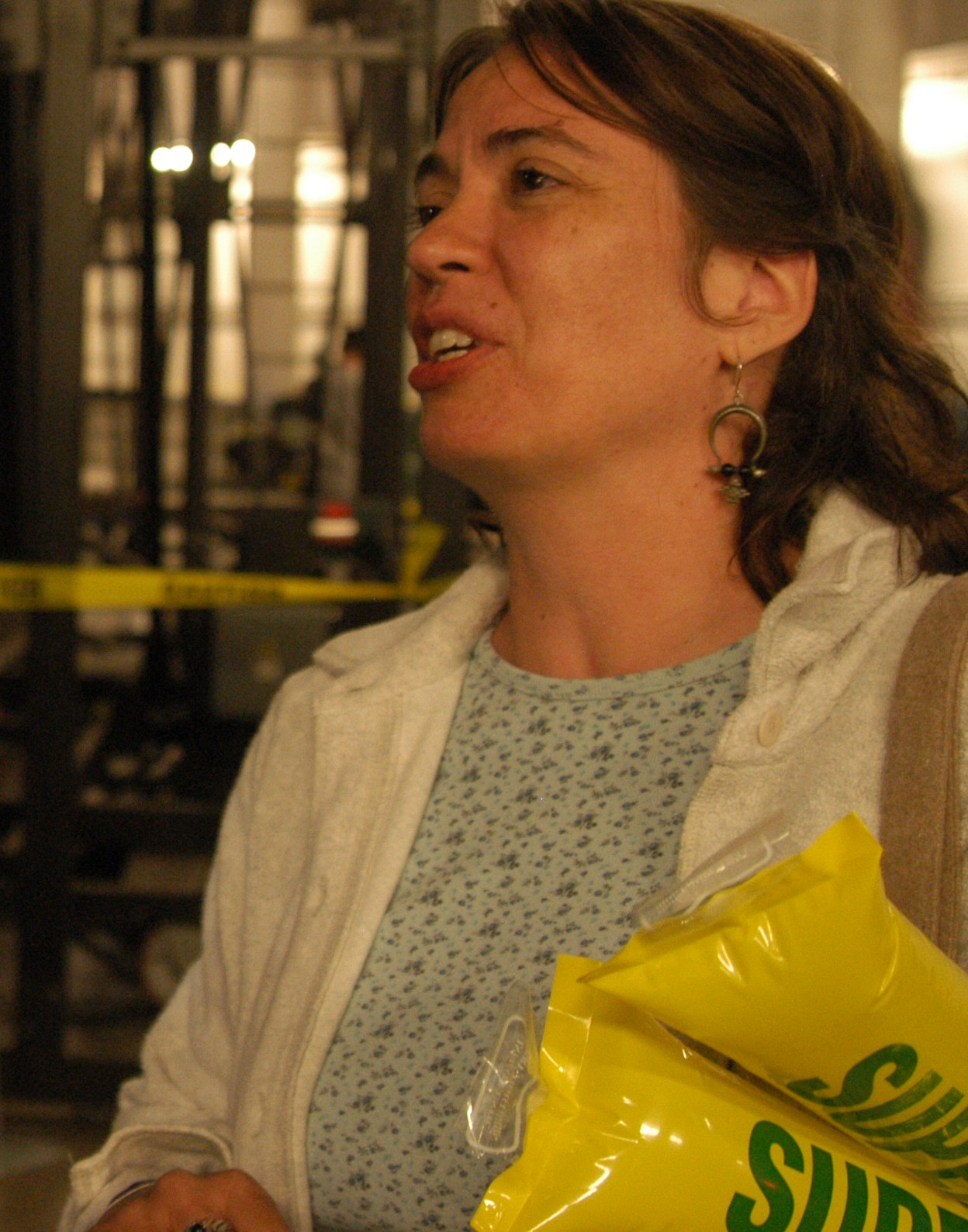
Day in 2004

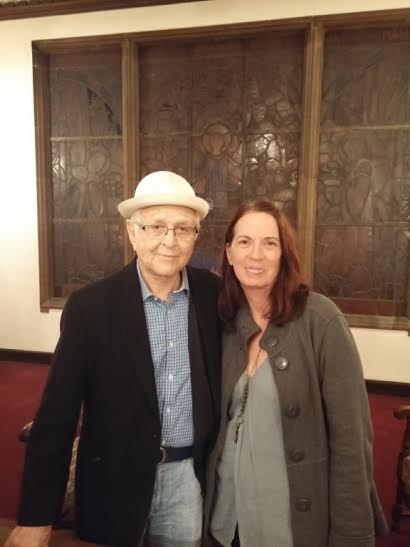
Day (right) with Norman Lear in 2014

Shelley M. Day (born April 16, 1957) is an American former video game producer.

== Career ==
Day began her career in 1985 at Electronic Arts. She also worked for Accolade, Taito and LucasArts before founding Humongous Entertainment together with colleague Ron Gilbert.

She was the producer on Grand Prix Circuit and The Duel: Test Drive II at Accolade, and Monkey Island 2: LeChuck's Revenge and Indiana Jones and the Fate of Atlantis at Lucasarts. She created the Putt-Putt series' eponymous protagonist as a bedtime story for her son, which later became a popular series of children's video games.

In 1999, she was listed on Time Magazine as one of the "Cyber Elite". After leaving Humongous Entertainment in 2001, Day and Gilbert founded Hulabee Entertainment to provide online games for kids, with approximately 20 former Humongous Entertainment staff joining them.

== Fraud conviction ==
In December 2005, Day was sentenced to 30 months in prison and five years on supervised release for defrauding the Asia Europe Americas Bank of Seattle of more than US$1.5 million in order to buy her "dream home" on Mercer Island. She was convicted of falsely claiming to the bank loan officer that Disney Interactive had agreed to buy part of Hulabee Entertainment and presenting forged documents to support that claim.
