= Bigby Wolf =

- Fables character
- Bigby Wolf, as illustrated in cover art of Fables: The Wolf Among Us #22 by Eric Nguyen.
- First appearance: Fables #1; May 8, 2002
- Last appearance: The Wolf Among Us 2; 2027
- Created by: Bill Willingham; Lan Medina
- Based on: Big Bad Wolf by Brothers Grimm
- Adapted by: Telltale Games (The Wolf Among Us)
- Designed by: Lan Medina
- Voiced by: Adam Harrington (The Wolf Among Us)

In-universe information
- Alias: Big Bad Wolf
- Species: Werewolf (Fable)
- Gender: Male
- Title: Sheriff
- Occupation: Detective
- Weapon: Superhuman breath; Wind breath; Wolf's claws and teeth
- Home: Fabletown, New York City
- Nationality: American

Bigby Wolf is a fictional character in the American comic book series Fables published by DC Comics and its alternative imprint Vertigo. The character first appears in Fables #1 (July 2002) and was created by Bill Willingham and Lan Medina. He frequently serves as the lead character among the ensemble cast of Fables and is the central protagonist of Fables: Werewolves of the Heartland as well as Fables: The Wolf Among Us, the comic book adaptation of the 2013 video game The Wolf Among Us.

Within the series, Bigby Wolf is a member of the "Fable" community – fantastical characters from fairy tales and folklore who formed a clandestine society centuries ago within New York City known as Fabletown, after their Homelands have been conquered by a mysterious and deadly enemy known as "the Adversary". Bigby is the embodiment of the Big Bad Wolf, a villainous wolf character appearing in several cautionary tales that include Grimms' Fairy Tales such as Little Red Riding Hood, Peter and the Wolf, and The Three Little Pigs, as well as some of Aesop's Fables. Effectively immortal like most other Fables, Bigby is capable of shapeshifting between human form, a therianthropic hybrid wolf-like creature form, and a giant wolf form. After gaining the ability to shapeshift and being pardoned for his past deeds, Bigby assumed the role of Fabletown's sheriff, and in the following centuries he has mostly remained in his human form and tries to put his dark past as a menacing predator behind him.

Bigby Wolf has received a positive reception for his complex characterization as an anti-heroic figure, and is considered by critics to be the closest character the Fable series has to a protagonist. The video game iteration of Bigby in The Wolf Among Us has also been well received.

== Concept and design ==
Bigby Wolf's first appearance is in Chapter One of the first story arc of Fables, titled "Old Tales Revisited", which has been collected in the trade paperback Fables: Legends in Exile. The story arc involves the mystery around Rose Red's apparent murder, where her boyfriend Jack Horner informs Bigby that she has been killed. Bigby informs Rose's sister, Snow White, and then proceeds to investigate the crime scene as the sheriff of Fabletown. In these early appearances, Bigby's well-muscled body, shaggy hair and habitual scowl on his face is similar to Hugh Jackman's portrayal of the Marvel Comics character Wolverine. Bigby's visual design evokes a film noir feel, and invited comparisons to Clint Eastwood's Dirty Harry character, and to Humphrey Bogart's various private detective characters: he has a constant five o'clock shadow over his face, who chain-smokes and wears a beige trench coat and loosened tie over his dress shirt, which is itself rolled into sleeves.

"At his core, Bigby is a monster. The civilized Bigby is a shell around him, the purpose of which is to keep the monster from getting out. But sometimes, shells break".

— Bill Willingham on Bigby Wolf

As a character patterned after the outlaw cultural hero archetype, Bigby shares similar traits with the likes of Jesse James or Robin Hood than traditional fairy-tale oriented ones. Bigby is depicted as primarily a champion of what he believes is right, who has never taken the law too strictly as he has shown a willingness to bend his own rules. Though Bigby resists the typical binary representation of man and animal, the series begins following a fairly typical transformative man/animal trajectory for his character arc. The creative team of the comic book series, Mark Buckingham and Bill Willingham, confirmed that Bigby started off with a malevolent personality as part of his origin story, but his fascination with Snow White and his desire to protect her was a turning point for his character arc. Bigby's ongoing personal journey to redemption, as depicted in the series, is constantly interspersed with multiple opportunities to revert to his bestial, violent nature, which is never completely absent according to Buckingham and Willingham. His constant internal struggle to keep his true nature in check is deemed necessary for him to coexist peacefully with other beings in a community, and that it is the only way for a creature like him to find redemption and forgiveness. While he serves an instrumental role to protect Fabletown from various threats, he often terrifies the very people he works to protect due to their knowledge of his dark past.

Bigby is featured as the central protagonist of a graphic novel spin-off, Fables: Werewolves of the Heartland, which follows the character as he searches for a new home on behalf of Fabletown. Bigby appears in the crossover comic Batman vs. Bigby! A Wolf in Gotham, which was published by DC Comics from September 2021 to February 2022.

== Fictional character biography ==
Having reformed from his violent ways, Bigby became the cigarette-smoking, trench coat-clad sheriff of Fabletown. He is extremely cunning and resourceful, in addition to being an excellent detective. Due to Snow White's possession of a lycanthropy-stained knife, he is now a werewolf and can change between wolf form, human form and an intermediate "wolfman" stage at will. In "The Great Fables Crossover", it is revealed that Bigby's nature as one of the North Wind's sons allows him to change forms at will. He is the son of the North Wind, which is where his legendary "huff and puff" ability comes from as well as control over the lower-tier winds. Despite his reformation, he can still be vicious if he believes the situation calls for it.

He develops feelings for Snow White and the two have a litter of seven children together. He quits his position as the sheriff due to the election of Prince Charming as Mayor, whom he despises, and leaves Fabletown. He has since returned and married Snow, and now lives with her and their cubs on a specially set-aside area of land up at the Farm. In "The Destiny Game", Bigby forces The Lady Of The Lake to change his fate: he will never grow old, but he will continue to grow in strength and power; fall in love with Snow White; father seven children who will become gods and monsters who will lay waste to worlds; and he will die seven times, outliving all of his cubs. So far, it is unknown how often Bigby has died.

Bigby eventually meets his end at the hands of Prince Brandish, who turns him into a glass statue and then destroys it. While the 13th-floor residents try to piece him together in hopes of reviving him, Mrs. Sprat removes a part of his glass body. Bigby is seen in his personal Heaven, where he meets Boy Blue and his son. Boy Blue tells him that while he can return to the living world, it would be a daunting task. Blue states that Bigby was meant to be one of the great destroyers, but that his fate was altered due to his love for Snow White. Bigby is eventually revived, but in a feral state. In the final arc he kills several mundy officers, along with Ozma, Beast, and Thrushbread. It is unclear if this state is due to Mrs. Sprat's actions or the challenge Boy Blue spoke of, but Winter's narration suggests the former. He is restored when Connor stands up to him. He and Snow then live happily ever after and have many descendants.

== In other media ==
Bigby in the form of a giant wolf battles the glass clones of Bloody Mary in The Wolf Among Us.

Bigby Wolf appears as the protagonist of The Wolf Among Us, a graphic adventure game played from a third-person perspective. Bigby is voiced by Adam Harrington, who also voices the Woodsman from Little Red Riding Hood, Bigby's longtime rival. Players control Bigby as he investigates the brutal murders of fairy tale characters and slowly unwinds the mystery of the Fabletown killer. When exploring an environment, Bigby can interact with objects and talk with non-player characters, many of whom are established series characters including Snow White, the Woodsman, and Beauty from Beauty and the Beast. Dialogue options chosen during conversations may have a positive or negative effect on how other characters view Bigby, and their perceptions have far-reaching consequences which influence future events in the narrative. Some scenes are more action-oriented, which subjects Bigby to a series of quick time event (QTE) prompts for players to respond to.

The video game's branching narrative is adapted and streamlined into a single canon plotline as Fables: The Wolf Among Us, with its first issue released on December 10, 2014 and published by Vertigo Comics. It was written by Matthew Sturges and Dave Justus, and serves as a canon prequel story to the comic book series. The series concluded on November 3, 2015 and collected as Fables: The Wolf Among Us Vol. 1.

Bigby is the main character of the upcoming sequel The Wolf Among Us 2, which will continue events after the first game, though it still serves as a prequel to the comic series. Harrington is set to reprise his role as the character. The game is developed by LCG Entertainment, doing business as Telltale Games, in association with AdHoc Studio which is composed of former Telltale Games staff.

== Reception ==
Bigby Wolf has been positively received by critics. Some sources consider Bigby to be a protagonist of the Fables series (known for its large ensemble cast of characters) as a leading man due to the central role he plays throughout much of the narrative. Kannenberg found that Bigby's initial depiction as a trenchcoat-wearing cynical detective with a chainsmoking habit in his early appearances adds a convincing touch of noir to the story. IGN picked Bigby as one of their favorite Fables characters, describing him as "Wolverine and Cyclops of the Fables team rolled into one", and "probably the most unlikely family man in all of Fabledom" which adds to his appeal as a main character.

Justin Clark from GameSpot described Bigby as a "brusque, cold, and brooding" Wolverine who wears Sam Spade's trench coat, noting his physical resemblance to the Lost series character James "Sawyer" Ford and that his "past misdeeds weigh on him constantly". While ultimately a malleable character by nature, he felt that the video game iteration of Bigby is a "different, lighter, more human character" even in light of any cruel decisions the player could make as Bigby. David Hinkle from Engadget praised the game's "intoxicating" mingling of mature themes like penance and redemption with fairy tale magic and superstitions as part of Bigby's character arc. He noted that Bigby is neither truly benevolent or malevolent and that he exists somewhere in the middle in terms of morality, showing empathy one moment yet purposefully provocative in another moment. Josiah Harrist from Kill Screen found that Bigby "steals the spotlight as the seemingly irredeemable anti-hero craving redemption" and that it is ironic that "Fabletown's biggest, baddest monster happens to be the one keeping the peace". Ozzie Mejia from Shacknews called Bigby "an interesting, multi-dimensional character" who can be moulded into "a heartless pursuer of vengeance" or an individual with "a heart of gold underneath his gruff exterior" depending on player choice.

Bigby Wolf from The Wolf Among Us was named Most Memorable Character for New Game Network's Game of the Year Awards 2014. For his work as Bigby Wolf, in 2014 Harrington received nominations from the BAFTA Games Awards for "Story and Performer" and from the National Academy of Video Game Trade Reviewers (NAVGTR) awards for "Performance in a Drama, Lead".

Following the initial announcement of a sequel to the Wolf Among Us in July 2017, Alex Walker from Kotaku expressed a preference for a story that revolves more around Bigby's desires, as opposed to Snow White or the political machinations of Fabletown which dominated the first game's narrative.

=== Analysis ===
In his essay "Negotiating Wartime Masculinity in Bill Willingham's Fables", Mark C. Hill described Bigby's characterization as "part hard-nosed detective, part soldier, part anti-hero", and that his role as the protector of Fabletown involved an eclectic cross between "small town sheriff and clandestine spy-master". He noted that Bigby's stereotypical Hollywood police detective persona is only one aspect of the disparate narratives and centuries of cultural ideologies that makes up the character's personal history. Hill linked Bigby to Joseph Campbell's hero myth pattern studies as an outsider marked with supernatural powers from birth, to the Beowulf legend with his ability to assume the alternate form of a werewolf-like creature, and to the politics of conflict and war that surround the creation of the Fables series with the character's service history and involvement in a counter-insurgency storyline. Hill argued that the character serves as a "liminal margin", a concept originally developed by Homi K. Bhabha, "where pedogogical, nationalistic and resistant narrative discourses construct, maneuver and negotiate identity".

Claudia Schwabe agreed with Hill's observation that while Bigby's masculinity and heroism are further emphasized through his involvement with military conflict, she called to question his argument that the "War Stories" story arc does not question or challenge the courage, duty or righteousness of America's war effort but instead glorified the cultural memory of the masculine hero-soldier in a war worth fighting for, and drew attention to what she perceived as the subversive nature of Part 2 of the story arc which presents the question of monstrosity or "otherness" versus evil. She pointed out that Bigby, a supernatural werewolf creature based in America, eventually befriends his "enemy", a Nazi-created version of the classic Frankenstein's monster who in fact harbors no hostile intentions towards Bigby, after he was tricked into killing the creature, claiming that the outcome of the story arc demonstrates the series' willingness to challenge readers' imagination of classic monsters and fairy-tale creatures as evil beings. To her view, the Fables series indicates that all evil acts may be forgiven and that any villainous character could find redemption if they are willing and able to make the attempt.

In her book A Tour of Fabletown: Patterns and Plots in Bill Willingham's Fables, Neta Gordon observed that new elements of Bigby's character were introduced in the series' later story arcs, where he is often depicted an interested, caring and protective father. Gordon opined that Bigby's fatherly persona augments his function as a "purveyor of wartime masculinity", and that it is "unusually rich" when compared to conventional fairy tale and folklore fathers. By the final volume of Fables, Bigby's importance in the series' narrative is greatly reduced, operating mostly as Snow White's domestic partner.

The potential for Bigby to unleash his anger and rage at other characters in The Wolf Among Us has been subject to discussion and analysis. Brian Albert from IGN compared Bigby to Lee Everett from The Walking Dead video game and opined that, unlike Lee, Bigby's reputation dominates his conversations, his work, and his relationships and never has the chance to be seen as a new person. Albert felt uncomfortable projecting his personal views onto what he believes to be a defined character during his playthrough, and as a result he came to appreciate the power of the game's narrative. Within this context, he felt that Bigby's circumstances justify the moments where he is allowed to embrace his dark nature and bring harm to other characters. G. Christopher Williams from PopMatters was amused by the possibility of Bigby (at the player's discretion) retaliating against non-player characters over their misogynistic misuse of the word "bitch", which literally means a female dog, as a form of insult. Williams argued that Bigby has the potential to become an "instructional tool for those who are concerned with casual misogyny" as well as "the kind of numbing effect that overused language has on its meanings and implications".

== Bibliography ==
- Susan Redington Bobby, ed. (2014). Fairy Tales Reimagined: Essays on New Retellings. McFarland. ISBN 978-078-645-396-2.
- Robert McKay; John Miller (2017). Werewolves, Wolves and the Gothic. University of Wales Press. ISBN 978-1786831026.
- Karin Kukkonen (2020). Contemporary Comics Storytelling. U of Nebraska Press. ISBN 978-149-620-908-5.
- Neta Gordon (2016). A Tour of Fabletown: Patterns and Plots in Bill Willingham's Fables. McFarland. ISBN 978-147-662-401-3.
- Gene Kannenberg (2008). 500 Essential Graphic Novels: The Ultimate Guide. HarperCollins. p. 121. ISBN 978-0-345-46781-2.
