= Fables: The Wolf Among Us =

Comic book series

- Cover of Fables: The Wolf Among Us #1

Publication information
- Publisher: Vertigo Comics
- Publication date: Dec 2014 — Nov 2015
- No. of issues: 16
- Main character(s): Bigby Wolf; Snow White

Creative team
- Written by: Lilah Sturges; Dave Justus

Fables: The Wolf Among Us is a comic book series based on the events of Telltale Games' The Wolf Among Us and published in 2014 by Vertigo Comics. It was written by Lilah Sturges and Dave Justus.

== Sales ==
The first issue sold an estimated 13,600 copies.

== Reception ==
According to Comic Book Round Up, comic book series received an average score of 8.1 out of 10 based on 13 reviews. IGN gave Fables: The Wolf Among Us #1 an 8 "Great" Rating. Greg Mcelhatton from Comic Book Resources wrote the first issue "is a nice way for those of us who never played the computer game to finally read its story". Richard Gray from Newsarama gave Fables: The Wolf Among Us #1 an 7 score of 10 and feels that "it might not be quite up to scratch with the main series that inspired it, but it is nevertheless a worthy companion to one of the most essential pieces of comic literature in the last few decades". His colleague Edward Kaye gave first issue an 6 score of 10.
