= Out from Boneville =

1991 comic book by Jeff Smith

- First US edition cover
- Author: Jeff Smith
- Illustrator: Jeff Smith
- Cover artist: Jeff Smith
- Language: English
- Series: Bone
- Genre: Fantasy, comedy
- Publisher: Graphix
- Publication date: May 29, 1995
- Publication place: United States
- Media type: Hardback and paperback
- Pages: 144
- ISBN: 0-9636609-4-2 (hardback); ISBN 0-9636609-9-3 (paperback)
- OCLC: 37351463
- Followed by: The Great Cow Race

Out From Boneville is the first story-arc in the Bone series. It collects the first six issues of Jeff Smith's self-published Bone comics. It marks the beginning of part one (of three) of the Bone series, titled Vernal Equinox. The book was first published by Cartoon Books in its original black-and-white version in 1995; excerpts were printed in Disney Adventures over the course of 1994–1998. Paperback and hardback colored editions were published in 2005 by Scholastic.

The first volume follows the three Bone cousins as they meet the inhabitants of a mysterious valley and seek their help in finding the way back to their home in Boneville.

== Synopsis ==
=== The Map ===
The three Bone cousins, Fone, Phoney and Smiley, are lost in the desert after being run out of their hometown of Boneville. Eventually they find a hand-drawn map and are attacked by a swarm of locusts. Fone Bone escapes, but falls off a cliff; climbs the other side; and finds a trail of Smiley's cigars that lead into a nearby mountain range. When he sleeps that night, two rat creatures attempt to eat him, and he is rescued by the Great Red Dragon. Soon after, he crosses over the mountains and into a valley and meets Ted (a treehopper-like insect), who suggests that Fone seek counsel from Thorn, before winter arrives; but Fone is soon isolated by the snow.

=== Thorn ===
Fone Bone has nearly built a winter house when his neighbor Miz Possum leaves her three sons in his care. During a game, they are caught by the two rat creatures; but Fone saves the children and sends them to their mother, while he distracts the rat creatures; these are ultimately driven away by the Great Red Dragon. Once re-assured of the opossums' safety, Fone discovers a hot spring, and becomes enamored of a young woman he encounters there. She identifies herself as Ted's friend Thorn, and takes Fone to her own house to consult her grandmother.

=== Phoney Bone ===
Fone Bone is staying at Thorn's house, and helping with chores prior to the arrival of Thorn's grandmother, Gran'ma Ben, who is coming from the annual Great Cow Race, while Thorn makes a pie. Fone Bone shows Thorn the map found in the desert, which Thorn finds familiar. Meanwhile, Phoney Bone meets Gran'ma Ben, and instantly offends her; but he and Fone Bone are reunited at the house.

=== Kingdok ===
The day before the Spring Fair at the nearby town, Fone and Phoney are helping out at Thorn and Ben's farmstead. To make extra money, Phoney sneaks into town early, and overhears the Rat Creatures are on the lookout for a "small bald creature with a star on its chest": a clear description of Phoney Bone himself. The Rat Creatures are called to council with the mysterious Hooded One: a facsimile of the Grim Reaper, who sends every Rat Creature in the valley to attack the farm.

=== Barrelhaven ===
With the farm house under attack, Gran'ma Ben fights off the Rat Creatures. When Thorn and Fone are surrounded, the Great Red Dragon chases the Rat Creature army away. They return to the farm house to find it wrecked and smoldering. Phoney Bone arrives at the Barrelhaven Tavern and discovers Smiley Bone as a barman; but is immediately recruited himself as dishwasher by proprietor Lucius Down, when his money is revealed to be worthless there.

=== Phoney's Inferno ===
Thorn, Fone, and the Dragon arrive back at the farm to find Gran'ma Ben alive, and the Dragon, in implication of a long acquaintance, addresses her by her first name of Rose; but she remains distrustful of him. Phoney Bone, at work under Lucius' orders, is frightened by the Hooded One. When Thorn, Ben, and Fone Bone arrive in town for the Spring Fair, the three Bone cousins are reunited at last.

== Video game ==
Bone: Out From Boneville, a video game adaptation of this book developed by Telltale Games, is available for the P.C./MacIntosh, and is the first in a series of Bone games from the same developers.
