= Batman: The Enemy Within =

2017 Batman adventure video game

- Developer: Telltale Games
- Publisher: Telltale Games
- Directors: Kent Mudle; Matthew Leach; Sean Manning; Chris Rieser
- Designers: Michael Kirkbride; Chris Hockabout; Emily Grace Buck; Chris Schroyer
- Writers: James Windeler; Shanon Ingles; Luke McMullen; Ross Beeley; Patrick Kevin Day; Lauren R. Mee; Meghan Thornton
- Composer: Jared Emerson-Johnson
- Engine: Telltale Tool
- Platforms: macOS; PlayStation 4; Windows; Xbox One; iOS; Android; Nintendo Switch
- Release: Episode 1: WW: August 8, 2017; Episode 2: WW: October 3, 2017; Episode 3: WW: November 21, 2017; Episode 4: WW: January 23, 2018; Episode 5: WW: March 27, 2018
- Genres: Graphic adventure Interactive film
- Mode: Single-player

Batman: The Enemy Within is a 2017 episodic point-and-click graphic adventure video game developed and published by Telltale Games and distributed by Warner Bros. Interactive Entertainment under its DC Entertainment label, based on the DC Comics character Batman. The game is a sequel to 2016's Batman: The Telltale Series. It received positive reviews, and is viewed as an improvement over the original, with the game's depiction of the Joker being highly praised by many reviewers. It is considered one of the best video games made by Telltale Games.

Though Telltale Games shut down in 2018, the licenses for the Batman and The Enemy Within games were acquired by Athlon Games, and both games were rereleased by LCG Entertainment under a new Telltale Games label as the combined "Shadows Edition" in December 2019.

== Gameplay ==
Like most Telltale games, the game features a similar episodic format found in other titles (such as Game of Thrones, The Walking Dead, The Wolf Among Us and Tales from the Borderlands). The player controls Bruce Wayne and his alter-ego Batman, with the game evenly split for both characters. The game features a branching narrative, similar to past Telltale games, giving the player options in approaching a situation and having that choice affect later events in the game. If the player had played the previous game, choices made, such as saving certain characters or stopping a criminal, may also be imported, though the game can be played as a standalone title. The game includes action sequences that are resolved similar to Telltale's other games, using quick time events. The series also includes investigation sequences, allowing the player to use Batman's detective skills to investigate areas. Sections of the game also present situations to the player where they may choose to approach as Bruce Wayne or as Batman. Crowd Play, a feature implemented in the predecessor, also returns for The Enemy Within, allowing streamers to let their audience interact with their session with the game.

== Synopsis ==
=== Characters ===
The player once again assumes control of Bruce Wayne / Batman (Troy Baker), a billionaire who secretly fights crime in Gotham City. His butler and former legal guardian Alfred Pennyworth (Enn Reitel), Police Commissioner James Gordon (Murphy Guyer), and Wayne Enterprises Chief of Technology Lucius Fox (Dave Fennoy) return to assist Batman in the field. The game introduces "The Agency", a mysterious government organization with its own agenda led by the ruthless Amanda Waller (Debra Wilson). New supporting characters are introduced, including Special Agent Iman Avesta (Emily O'Brien), one of the Agency's operatives and a fan of Batman, and Tiffany Fox (Valarie Rae Miller), the daughter of Lucius and an employee at Wayne Enterprises.

"John Doe" (Anthony Ingruber) and Selina Kyle / Catwoman (Laura Bailey) also return, now members of a group of criminals called "the Pact". Other members of the group include Riddler (Robin Atkin Downes), Bane (JB Blanc), Dr. Victor Fries / Mr. Freeze (Matthew Mercer) and Harleen Quinzel / Harley Quinn (Laura Post).

Detective Renee Montoya (Sumalee Montano), Reporter Jack Ryder (Robert Clotworthy) and Wayne Enterprises Chairwoman Regina Zellerbach (Lorri Holt) return with smaller roles within the series. New minor characters introduced include Police Detective Harvey Bullock (Keith Szarabajka), Agency operative Vernon Blake (Christian Lanz), international arms dealer Rumi Mori (Keone Young), Riddler's second-in-command Eli Knable (Alex Hernandez), and Stacked Deck patrons Frank Dumfree and Willy Deever (Kirk Thornton and Dave B. Mitchell respectively).

=== Setting ===
The Enemy Within is set in the same Batman continuity introduced in Batman: The Telltale Series, which took place a number of years into Batman's career. Like the previous installment, the game is set during the mid-to-late 2010s in Gotham City, primarily the Batcave, Wayne Enterprises, and Gotham City Police Headquarters. The game also follows the events of the previous game, taking place between a couple of months to a year after these events.

=== Plot ===
A year after defeating the Children of Arkham, Bruce Wayne witnesses the return of the Riddler to Gotham while investigating arms dealer Rumi Mori. Batman, Commissioner Gordon, and the GCPD fail to capture Riddler, and the investigation is taken over by the mysterious Agency, led by Amanda Waller. Riddler leaves behind a puzzle box for Batman. When Lucius Fox investigates the puzzle at Bruce's request, he is killed by a homing missile summoned by a signal emitted from the device. At Lucius's funeral, Bruce reunites with Arkham patient John Doe, who offers to help Bruce track down Riddler if Bruce agrees to meet his friends, known as "the Pact". Following John's tip to Riddler's lair, Batman and Gordon deduce that Riddler is targeting Agency operatives with missiles he had purchased from Mori. Batman apprehends Riddler, who reveals he is also a member of the Pact, but Riddler is shot dead by an unknown person. Waller assumes control of Gotham law enforcement. With Riddler, her previous lead to the Pact, dead, she reveals she knows Batman's secret identity and blackmails him to infiltrate the Pact as Bruce.

After Batman fails to stop Bane from raiding a GCPD armory, Bruce establishes a friendship with John to infiltrate the Pact through him. Harley Quinn demands Bruce prove himself by stealing an electronic skeleton key from Wayne Enterprises. Bruce succeeds but arouses suspicion from Lucius's daughter Tiffany. After convincing fellow Pact members Bane and Mr. Freeze to trust him, Bruce accompanies them as they raid an Agency convoy and recover Riddler's preserved body. Catwoman, revealed to be a former associate of Riddler, helps Bruce and John uncover SANCTUS, a rogue faction of the Agency with which Riddler was formerly involved. From Riddler's laptop, the Pact tracks down their target: the hidden SANCTUS lab in Gotham. Tipped off by Tiffany, Gordon arrests Bruce for colluding with the Pact, but Waller intervenes and has Gordon dismissed. Just before their raid on SANCTUS, the Pact suspects a mole, and Bruce is forced to give up either himself or Catwoman as the traitor. Bruce, as himself or Batman, foils the raid, but Harley escapes with a sample of a biological weapon known as the Lotus virus.

From a captive Mr. Freeze, Bruce and Waller's aide Iman Avesta learn that the Lotus virus was a failed SANCTUS project, with Riddler the only survivor of its experiments. The Pact planned to use Riddler's blood to convert the virus into a healing serum and cure their various ailments, while Waller planned to use it to make them serve her. Avesta, suspicious of Waller, destroys Riddler's preserved blood. John reluctantly agrees to help track Harley, but when Bruce discovers him surrounded by agents he has killed, John claims he acted in self-defense, as well as reveals he knows Bruce is Batman, and the player must decide whether to trust him or arrest him. Depending on the choice made, John either helps bring in Harley or helps her escape.

Weeks later, John reemerges as the Joker, either a vigilante with a twisted sense of morality or a villain colluding with Harley to exact revenge on Bruce for "betraying" him. The former scenario follows Batman, Joker, and Avesta as they collaborate against the corrupt Agency, now in control of the Pact and Catwoman, until Joker, frustrated with Batman's non-lethal policy, kidnaps and attempts to kill Waller. The latter scenario has Harley distributing the Lotus virus across Gotham in an attempt to recreate the healing serum from another survivor's blood, while Joker pits Bruce against Gordon, Tiffany, Alfred, and Selina Kyle in cruel games of trust. In either setting, Bruce learns that Tiffany was the one who assassinated Riddler and eventually defeats Joker. Waller pulls the Agency out of Gotham and vows to protect Bruce's identity in gratitude. Alfred resigns from Bruce's employ, disillusioned by the effects Batman has had on Gotham, and Bruce either abandons his Batman identity or lets Alfred leave.

In the post-credits scene, Joker either plots his revenge against Bruce in Arkham Asylum or is visited by him there, glad to see his friend back.

== Episodes ==
All episodes below were released for macOS, PlayStation 4, Windows, Xbox One, and mobile platforms on the dates given. The Nintendo Switch version was released as a single package on October 2, 2018.

No. overall	No. in season	Title	Directed by	Written by	Original release date
6	1	"The Enigma"	Kent Mudle	James Windeler, Patrick Kevin Day & Shanon Ingles	August 8, 2017
When the Riddler, one of Gotham's oldest and deadliest criminals, suddenly returns, Batman must work with allies old and new to stop this growing threat.
7	2	"The Pact"	Matthew Leach	Luke McMullen, Chris Hockabout, Shanon Ingles & Patrick Kevin Day	October 3, 2017
Bruce infiltrates a dangerous criminal alliance to investigate the Riddler's conspiracy. Dealing with pressure from Waller and an erratic John Doe, Bruce must make tough decisions to gain the gang's trust.
8	3	"Fractured Mask"	Sean Manning	Ross Beeley, Shanon Ingles, Lauren R. Mee & Josh Trujillo	November 21, 2017
Bruce navigates his dual identity as he deepens his undercover infiltration of the Pact and unexpectedly reunites with Selina Kyle/Catwoman.
9	4	"What Ails You"	Chris Rieser	Patrick Kevin Day & Lauren R. Mee	January 23, 2018
As the villains' lethal plot escalates, Bruce is forced into a desperate change of plans to stop them, whilst uncovering Waller and the Agency's true intentions.
10	5	"Same Stitch"	Kent Mudle	Meghan Thornton, Ross Beeley & Lauren R. Mee	March 27, 2018
The looming threat on Gotham reaches its boiling point, forcing Bruce to decide how far he's willing to go to protect his city as a new force threatens to bring it to its knees.

=== Shadows Edition ===
Following Telltale Games' closure in 2018, some of the studio's games were acquired by LCG Entertainment. A new Telltale Games was reformed by LCG Entertainment in 2019. A Telltale Batman Shadows Edition has both of the Telltale Batman games, which includes a special noir-like filter the user can apply to the game, as well as graphical upgrades and bug fixes. This edition was released on December 17, 2019 for Windows and Xbox One users, with other platforms to follow. Owners of either original game on any platform could upgrade to this version by purchasing a piece of downloadable content.

== Reception ==
Aggregate review scores
Game	Metacritic
Complete Season	(PC) 80/100
Episode 1: The Enigma	(PC) 76 (PS4) 70 (XONE) 77
Episode 2: The Pact	(PC) 71 (PS4) 67 (XONE) 64
Episode 3: Fractured Mask	(PC) 71 (PS4)70
Episode 4: What Ails You	(PC) 77 (PS4) 77 (XONE) 81
Episode 5: Same Stitch	(PC) 85 (PS4) 88

Batman: The Enemy Within received generally positive reviews and is considered to be an improvement over its predecessor, earning praise for its story, choices, action sequences, and the portrayal of the Batman mythos. The game won the award for "Performance in a Drama, Supporting" with Debra Wilson at the 17th Annual National Academy of Video Game Trade Reviewers Awards, whereas its other nomination was for "Game, Franchise Adventure". Episode 5 was nominated for "Outstanding Achievement in Videogame Writing" at the Writers Guild of America Awards 2018, while the game itself was again nominated at the 18th Annual National Academy of Video Game Trade Reviewers Awards, this time for "Writing in a Drama".

The game's portrayal of the Joker stood out for many reviewers, with the opportunity to prevent him from becoming a villain critically lauded. Scott Maslow from GQ said it managed to make "Batman's most overexposed villain interesting again; The Joker has always said his past is multiple-choice, but this is the first time I've felt like I was the one checking the boxes". Bradley Shankar from MobileSyrup gave a positive review, saying that "Batman: The Enemy Within offers one of the greatest Joker stories ever told". He explained that "while there have been numerous great interpretations of the Batman-Joker relationship over the years, there has never been one quite as complex and morally grey as what Telltale has created with The Enemy Within". Tamoor Hussain from GameSpot gave the final episode a 9/10, concluding: "While Telltale's first Batman season stuck a bit too close to established mythos and delivered an underwhelming ending, the second is a memorable Joker origin story that Bat-fans should make a point of playing". Stephanie Chan from VentureBeat was slightly less enthusiastic but still gave the game a score of 80/100: "By the end of the series, I'll say that Batman: The Enemy Within has tentatively won me over. That's purely on the strength of the relationship between Batman and The Joker".

== Recall ==
The second episode of the game has been recalled and edited, after it was discovered that a photograph was used of the dead body of murdered Russian ambassador Andrei Karlov.
