= Adam Harrington (voice actor) =

American voice actor (born 1970)

- Born: June 18, 1970 (age 56); San Francisco, California, U.S.
- Occupation: Voice actor
- Years active: 2001–present

Adam Harrington (born June 18, 1970) is an American voice actor who has appeared in various video games, often working with developers Telltale Games and Riot Games.

Harrington is known for his role as Bigby Wolf, the main protagonist of The Wolf Among Us, for which he was nominated for a BAFTA Award for Best Performer.

== Filmography ==
=== Video games ===
List of voice performances in video games
Year	Title	Role	Notes	Source
2001	Blood Wake	Narrator, Announcer		
2002	Liberty's Kids	James Armistead		
2003	Disaster Report	Eric Lu, Albert Sims		
2004	Blood Will Tell	Narrator, Jyukai		
2006	25 to Life	Additional Voices		
2006	The Godfather	Johnny Trapani, Cuneo Racket Boss, Additional Voices		
2007	U.B. Funkeys	Dali		
2009	Tales of Monkey Island	Moose, LeChuck	2 episodes	
2009	Modern Combat: Sandstorm	Soldiers		
2010	Star Trek Online	Kar'Ukan, Madred, Rugan Skyl, Franklin Drake		
2010	Infinite Space	Balik, Generic Male		
2010	Iron Man 2	A.I.M. Soldiers, S.H.I.E.L.D. Agents		
2010	Heroes of Newerth	King Crab, Liberator Jereziah, Syphon		
2010	Nelson Tethers: Puzzle Agent	Issac Davner		
2010–11	Back to the Future: The Game	Matches	2 episodes	
2011	L.A. Noire	Patrolman Harvey Keller		
2011	Test Drive Unlimited 2	Kalua Man, Ad Man, Business Man, Bouncer		
2011	Rift	Orphiel Farwind, Swarmlord Khargroth, Mertin Latham, Elf Stylist, Asache the Woodsman, Cletus Redfield, Phineas Bower, Prince Casimar, Q'Uelas Swarmlord, Jultharian, Human Barber, Praegon, Scotty Malm, Diago, Psychophage Primaker, Toad Lick Hallucination		
2011	Tom Clancy's Rainbow Six: Shadow Vanguard	Commander Danko, Engineer, Phoenix Terrorists		
2011	Puzzle Agent 2	Foreman Isaac Davner, Repairman Scruffman		
2011	The Adventures of Tintin: The Secret of the Unicorn	Captain Haddock, Sir Francis Haddock	iOS only	
2011	Modern Combat 3: Fallen Nation	Narrator, Popovich, Russian Soldier		
2012–13	The Walking Dead	Andrew St. John, Jerry, Leland	2 episodes	
2012	The Amazing Spider-Man	Robot Tech Gear, OsCorp Guard	Alongside Brian Bloom	
2012	Wild Blood	King Arthur		
2013	Neverwinter	Various		
2013–14	The Wolf Among Us	Bigby Wolf, The Woodsman		
2014	Dawngate	Kahgen, Kensu	Cancelled	
2014	KatataK	Announcer, Benny, Dr. Katze		
2014	Tales from the Borderlands	Kroger, Hyperion Captain		
2016	Minecraft: Story Mode	TorqueDawg	Ep. "A Portal to Mystery"	
2016	2064: Read Only Memories	Doctor Yannick Fairlight		
2016	The Elder Scrolls V: Skyrim - Stonecrest City	Maergl		
2016	Mafia III	Additional Cinematics Cast, Additional Voices		
2017	Halo Wars 2	Additional Voices		
2017	Guardians of the Galaxy: The Telltale Series	Groot, Alien #4		
2017	XCOM 2: War of the Chosen	Reaper Soldier		
2017	Marvel vs. Capcom: Infinite	Grandmaster Meio		
2017	Raw Data	Male Protagonist		
2017	Middle-earth: Shadow of War	Nemesis Orcs		
2018	Remothered: Tormented Fathers	Richard Felton		
2018	Red Dead Redemption 2	The Local Pedestrian Population		
2019	Marvel Ultimate Alliance 3: The Black Order	Groot, Lockjaw		
2022	Triangle Strategy	Benedict Pascal		
2024	Read Only Memories: Neurodiver	CROW, Golden Instinct		
2024	Marvel Rivals	Groot		
2027	The Wolf Among Us 2	Bigby Wolf	Teaser trailer revealed at 2019's The Game Awards	

=== Live-action ===
List of acting performances in film and television
Year	Title	Role	Notes	Source
2010	I (Almost) Got Away with It	Lane Slettvet	Ep. "Got to Pick Up a Hooker"	
2015	Dutch Hollow	News Talk Radio #1		
