= Batman vs. Bigby! A Wolf in Gotham =

2021 comic book miniseries

- Cover of Batman vs. Bigby! A Wolf in Gotham #1

Publication information
- Publisher: DC Comics
- Schedule: Monthly
- Format: Limited series
- Publication date: September 2021 — February 2022
- No. of issues: 6
- Main character(s): Batman; Bigby Wolf

Creative team
- Written by: Bill Willingham
- Artist(s): Brian Level; Jay Leisten
- Letterer: Steve Wands
- Colorist: Lee Loughridge

Batman vs. Bigby! A Wolf in Gotham is a six-issue comic book miniseries that was published by DC Comics from September 2021 to February 2022.

== Synopsis ==
Batman meets Bigby Wolf.

== Prints ==
=== Issues ===
Title	Issue	Publication date	Comicscore Index	Comic Book Roundup Rating	Ref.
Batman vs. Bigby! A Wolf in Gotham	#1	September 21, 2021	55	7.1	
Batman vs. Bigby! A Wolf in Gotham	#2	October 19, 2021	58	7.3	
Batman vs. Bigby! A Wolf in Gotham	#3	November 16, 2021	53	7	
Batman vs. Bigby! A Wolf in Gotham	#4	December 21, 2021	55	7.2	
Batman vs. Bigby! A Wolf in Gotham	#5	January 18, 2022	56	7.2	
Batman vs. Bigby! A Wolf in Gotham	#6	February 22, 2022	51	6.8	

=== Collected editions ===
Title	Format	Publication date	Collected material	Pages	ISBN
Batman vs. Bigby! A Wolf in Gotham	Paperback	May 10, 2022	Batman vs. Bigby! A Wolf in Gotham #1-6	160	9781779515254, 1779515251

== Reception ==
Hannah Rose from Comic Book Resources, reviewing the debut, was not thrilled with the plot but praised the artists. Chase Magnet from ComicBook.com wrote Brian Level "manages to capture much of the style that made Fables exactly what it was without ever losing sense of himself".

According to Comicscored.com, the limited series received mixed or average ratings, with a Comicscore Index of 55 based on 39 ratings from critics.
