= The Wolf Among Us 2 =

Upcoming video game

- Developers: Telltale Games; Trick Studios
- Publishers: Telltale Games; PM Studios
- Director: Zak Garriss
- Composer: Jared Emerson-Johnson
- Series: Fables
- Engine: Unreal Engine 5
- Platforms: Nintendo Switch; Nintendo Switch 2; PlayStation 5; Windows; Xbox One; Xbox Series X/S
- Release: 2027
- Genres: Graphic adventure Interactive film
- Mode: Single-player

The Wolf Among Us 2 is an upcoming episodic adventure game developed by Telltale Games and Trick Studios and published by Telltale and PM Studios. It is a sequel to the 2013 game The Wolf Among Us, with the title taking place six months following the events of the previous title.

Until 2023, AdHoc Studio was contracted to develop the game for Telltale and had scripted the full season, but pulled out due to creative differences. It is set to be released in 2027, and will consist of five episodes like the first game.

== Development ==
When The Wolf Among Us was completed in July 2014, Telltale Games thought about developing a second season. By this point, however, they were already committed to other projects, such as Tales from the Borderlands, Minecraft: Story Mode, and Game of Thrones. The company was aware of a strong interest in a second season through the intervening years, and they were looking for the right time to develop it.

A second yet-to-be-named season was announced at San Diego Comic-Con 2017 and was originally set to premiere in 2018 for personal computers, consoles, and mobile devices. Both Adam Harrington and Erin Yvette were to reprise their roles as Bigby Wolf and Snow White, respectively. Job Stauffer said that Season Two would not resolve the apparent cliffhanger related to Nerissa's connection to Faith; he said that it was meant to be ending similar to a film noir work that made the viewer think about the implications, but never saw this themselves as a cliffhanger. Instead, Season 2 would have continued on with more narrative related to Bigby and Snow. By May 2018, Telltale announced that due to recent internal studio issues, they had to push back the release of the sequel until 2019. In September 2018, Telltale had a majority studio closure due to "insurmountable challenges", cancelling The Wolf Among Us' second season among other projects in development.

Upon Telltale's revival by LCG Entertainment, The Wolf Among Us was one of the titles reacquired by LCG, but no announcement was made at that time about the sequel. The company announced The Wolf Among Us 2 at The Game Awards 2019, stating the story would continue after the events of the first game, though it would still remain as a prequel to the comic series. The game was being developed in association with AdHoc Studio, formed by former Telltale Games staff, who were to focus on the game's narrative and cinematic elements while Telltale would implement the gameplay and other designs. In addition to returning Telltale staff, Harrington and Yvette reprised their respective roles as Bigby and Snow, and Jared Emerson-Johnson composed music for the game. The physical version of the game would be published by Athlon Games in partnership with Telltale. The game was being developed on the Unreal Engine 4 before it was upgraded to Unreal Engine 5 during 2023, and will be released in an episodic approach.

This sequel would be worked completely from scratch, using none of the ideas and initial work that had been done under the former Telltale banner before its closure. Unlike the past development cycle approach at the former Telltale where each episode was developed in a standalone fashion, all episodes of The Wolf Among Us 2 were being developed simultaneously. The game was set to be released in 2023, but on March 1, 2023, Telltale announced the game was delayed out of 2023 with reports saying that a new release date was "to be expected" in 2024. The development team decided that switching to Unreal Engine 5 would be "worth the effort" of redoing much of the work that was already done on Unreal Engine 4 due to the abundance of features in a newer version of the engine and the delay decision was made to avoid doing crunch during this switch.

Telltale claimed that while they had to lay off a portion of their team in September 2023 due to "market conditions", work on The Wolf Among Us 2 was ongoing. Telltale cinematic artist Jonah Huang, who worked at the studio in both its current and original incarnation, was one of those affected, and claimed the studio "laid most of us off early September". Telltale reiterated that The Wolf Among Us 2 was still in development in October 2024 after they denied a claim that the game was on the verge of cancellation.

AdHoc Studio spoke about The Wolf Among Us 2 both prior to and following the release of their game Dispatch in late 2025. According to AdHoc, they did most of the writing and cinematic work for The Wolf Among Us 2, but were told by Telltale that they needed more time. Later on, AdHoc and Telltale ran into disagreements, with the former expressing frustration over not granting creative control over the project. By this point, AdHoc had written the full season script and had begun prototyping and shooting cutscenes. Without direction from Telltale, AdHoc pulled out of the project to focus on developing Dispatch, and they had no idea of the state of The Wolf Among Us 2 at that point, or how much of their script would ultimately be used.

At Summer Game Fest 2026, The Wolf Among Us 2 was reintroduced, with a planned 2027 release on Nintendo Switch and Switch 2, PlayStation 5, Windows, Xbox One, and Xbox Series X/S. Telltale's CEO Jamie Ottilie said that up to around 2022, their internal development on the game was using the legacy Telltale engine and Unreal Engine 4, but opted to restart the game's development using more modern engines in 2023, which was part of the reason for the delay in release. At that time, Telltale was aware that it would be a few years before any input from AdHoc would be needed, and released them from their contractual engagement, which allowed AdHoc to switch over to work on Dispatch. Once they were ready to engage with a third-party developer, they brought in Trick Studios, who they had been working with already on other games, to work on completing the game's content, expanding on some of the existing work AdHoc did but revising as necessary with the reset in the game's development.

Along with the release news, Telltale announced a remastered version of the original game. Ottilie said that the remastered version came out of their upgrading of the sequel's engine, as they were trying to update the game to support modern consoles, through experiments found they could use their improved tools to make the game look better and opted to release it as a remaster than a port. Telltale and co-publisher PM Studios confirmed that they intended to pivot to a simultaneous release of all episodes for the game instead of following Telltale's old episodic release strategy. On June 12, 2026, it was revealed that Zak Garriss from Deck Nine, who previously directed Life Is Strange: Before the Storm (2017) and Life Is Strange: True Colors (2021), was set as the director for The Wolf Among Us 2 for Telltale.
