= Batman: The Telltale Series =

- Developer: Telltale Games
- Publisher: Telltale Games
- Directors: Kent Mudle; Jonathan Stauder; Jason Pyke; Mark Droste
- Producer: Brodie Andersen
- Designers: Chris Hockabout; Michael Kirkbride; Emily Grace Buck; Mark Darin
- Programmers: Tulley Rafferty; Jason Kim; Greg Felber; Michael Carpenter
- Artist: Martin McDonald
- Writers: Zack Keller; James Windeler; Patrick Kevin Day; Nicole Martinez; Shanon Ingles; Eric Stirpe; Meghan Thornton
- Composer: Jared Emerson-Johnson
- Series: Batman
- Engine: Telltale Tool
- Platforms: PlayStation 4; Windows; Xbox One; PlayStation 3; Xbox 360; iOS; Android; Nintendo Switch
- Release: Episode 1: PlayStation 4, Windows, & Xbox One; WW: August 2, 2016 PlayStation 3; NA: September 13, 2016; PAL: September 23, 2016 Xbox 360; WW: September 14, 2016 iOS; WW: September 20, 2016 Android; WW: October 26, 2016; Episode 2: PlayStation 4, Windows, & Xbox One; WW: September 20, 2016 Xbox 360; WW: September 27, 2016 iOS; WW: October 8, 2016 PlayStation 3; WW: October 18, 2016; Episode 3: PlayStation 3, PlayStation 4, Windows, Xbox 360 & Xbox One; WW: October 25, 2016; Episode 4: PlayStation 3, PlayStation 4, Windows, Xbox 360 & Xbox One; WW: November 22, 2016; Episode 5: PlayStation 3, PlayStation 4, Windows, Xbox 360 & Xbox One; WW: December 13, 2016
- Genres: Graphic adventure Interactive film
- Mode: Single-player

Batman: The Telltale Series is a 2016 episodic point-and-click graphic adventure video game developed and published by Telltale Games and distributed by Warner Bros. Interactive Entertainment under its DC Entertainment label. The game is based on the DC Comics character Batman, created by Bob Kane and Bill Finger, though not tied to any previous adaptation of the work in film or other media. Upon release, it received a mixed reception, with praise given for its atmosphere, action sequences, and faithfulness to the Batman mythos, but was criticized for its technical issues and plot. A second season, titled Batman: The Enemy Within, was released in 2017, and was viewed as an improvement over the original.

Though Telltale Games shut down in 2018, the licenses for the Batman and The Enemy Within games were acquired by Athlon Games, and both games were re-released by LCG Entertainment under a new Telltale Games label as the combined Shadows Edition in December 2019.

== Gameplay ==
The player takes the role of Batman, both as the superhero and as his alter ego Bruce Wayne. The playtime is split evenly between them, though at times the game will offer the player a choice of whether to approach a specific situation as Wayne or as Batman. Despite differences in continuity, Batman fits closely with the comics, but his personality and actions are determined by the player's decisions. He can either be a much more traditional and inspiring hero as Batman compared to the other versions of the Dark Knight or a much more aggressive and colder character than how he is usually portrayed. The game's narrative offers a "fresh interpretation of the universe set in current times, not tied to any existing iteration of Batman in games, film, or comics", according to Telltale. The game is set a few years after Wayne decides to become Batman, giving them flexibility in their writing and gameplay to give the player some control on how they want to play the character without ties to any established narrative. The game features a branching narrative, similar to previous Telltale games, giving the player options in approaching a situation and having that choice affect later events in the game. The game includes action sequences that are resolved similar to Telltale's other games, using quick time events. The series also includes investigation sequences, allowing the player to use Batman's detective skills to progress the story.

The series also introduces a new feature called "crowd play", available on both the PC and console versions of the game. Crowd play allows the game to be watched by an audience who can participate in the decision-making process. When this feature is active, the player provides their audience with a link to Telltale's website with a unique code to participate in that session through any web-enabled device. These additional players are given the option to vote at the game's decision points, with the results presented to the main player to judge which decision to make. Optionally, the main player can have the game automatically take the most-popular decision for them. This mode is intended to be used for an audience at the same physical setting, such as a living room or movie theater; though this mode can be used through streaming services like Twitch, Telltale warned that latency issues may hamper the viewing players' experience. Telltale's head of creative communications Job Stauffer said that they had seen their games, as well as older point-and-click titles, popularized on streaming channels. Furthermore, when they premiered Tales from the Borderlands at the Alamo Drafthouse, they found the audience shouting out which choices the demonstrators should take. This led to them working to create a more interactive experience for watchers. They premiered this feature at San Diego Comic-Con 2016 to 500 attendees.

== Synopsis ==
=== Setting ===
Batman: The Telltale Series, like most Batman centered media, is set within Gotham, a city infested with both crime and corruption. The time period which the series is set seems to be the mid-to-late 2010s, with technologies such as drones and smartphones being used by characters. Though a majority of the plot takes place in various areas of the city, the player visits several different landmarks on multiple occasions, including Wayne Manor, the Batcave, Gotham City Hall, GCPD Headquarters, and Arkham Asylum.

=== Characters ===
The player-protagonist of Batman is Bruce Wayne (Troy Baker), secretly also the titular character. He is the CEO of Wayne Enterprises and the heir to the Wayne fortune, who uses his wealth to fund his activities as a vigilante. Wayne is assisted in his operations by Alfred Pennyworth (Enn Reitel), his butler and former guardian, and Lucius Fox (Dave Fennoy), the head of technology at Wayne Enterprises. Wayne is also friends with Harvey Dent (Travis Willingham), the District Attorney and Mayor candidate, and an associate of Vicki Vale (Erin Yvette), a reporter for the Gotham Gazette. As Batman, he also receives occasional help from James Gordon (Murphy Guyer), a lieutenant and contact in the Gotham City Police Department, and Selina Kyle / Catwoman (Laura Bailey), a skilled thief who works with him if their needs align.

The main antagonists of the series are a terrorist organization called the "Children of Arkham", led by a masked figure called "Lady Arkham" (Steven Blum). Members of the group include Oswald Cobblepot / Penguin (Jason Spisak) and Roland Desmond / Blockbuster (also voiced by Blum). Common criminals that appear in the game include Carmine Falcone (Richard McGonagle), the head of the Falcone Crime Family, and Hamilton Hill (Robert Pescovitz), the corrupt Mayor of Gotham City. Whilst at Arkham Asylum, the player also meets various inmates, including convicted serial killer Victor Zsasz (Kiff VandenHeuvel), former ventriloquist Arnold Wesker (Larry Brisbowitz), and the mysterious "John Doe" (Anthony Ingruber). Other characters that appear include GCPD Sergeant Renee Montoya (Krizia Bajos), Commissioner Peter Grogan (Robert Clotworthy), Wayne Enterprises chairwoman Regina Zellerbach (Lorri Holt), and Gotham City News reporter Jack Ryder (also voiced by Clotworthy). Flashbacks feature Bruce's deceased parents, Thomas and Martha Wayne (voiced by Baker and Holt, respectively), and their murderer Joe Chill (Jarion Monroe).

=== Plot ===
While responding to a break-in at the Gotham City Hall, Batman engages in combat with a group of mercenaries and Catwoman, the latter having broken into the Mayor's safe and stolen a drive. During the fight, Batman steals the drive whilst she manages to escape. Returning to Wayne Manor, Bruce endorses Harvey Dent's Mayoral campaign against Hamilton Hill, during which he meets crime lord Carmine Falcone. While investigating and decrypting the drive, Bruce receives word from Alfred that his childhood friend Oswald Cobblepot, now a criminal called "Penguin", has returned to Gotham. Meeting up in Cobblepot Park, Oswald warns Bruce of a revolution in Gotham.

Accusations come to light that Thomas and Martha Wayne were affiliated with the Falcone family. While meeting Harvey to discuss these claims, Bruce also meets Harvey's date Selina Kyle, where they both deduce each other's identities. Selina reluctantly gives Bruce the address of a meeting place with her employer: a warehouse at the Gotham City docks. Investigating as Batman, he finds the location to be the site of a shootout between the GCPD and the same mercenaries from City Hall. Believing Falcone to be involved, Bruce also finds evidence of a psychoactive agent being stored there. After finishing the decryption of the drive, Bruce discovers evidence of Falcone's criminal organization, along with ties to Mayor Hill. After handing it over to either reporter Vicki Vale or Lt. James Gordon, he confronts Falcone as Batman and interrogates him about the shootout. Falcone admits to having ownership of the chemicals but denies involvement in the shootout. Under further interrogation, he also reveals that the allegations against the Wayne family are true, confirming this with a photograph of them, Hill and Falcone. When Bruce confronts Alfred, he learns that his parents collaborated with Falcone and Hill to control Gotham and that he had hidden the truth in the hopes he would not follow in their footsteps.

Whilst confronting Falcone on his family's criminal ties, Bruce witnesses his murder at the hands of a drugged officer, Renee Montoya. Based on her testimony upon recovering from the injection, Batman deduces that Penguin was responsible for the shootout at the docks and the assassination, having synthesized the stolen chemicals. After discovering that Penguin intends to murder Catwoman for failing her assignment, Bruce aids her escape. Stealing a phone from one of Selina's attackers, Bruce discovers that Hill has also been involved with Penguin and confronts him on the information. Under interrogation, Hill reveals to have leaked information about Falcone and the Waynes to Penguin and his organization, the Children of Arkham, to hold off their plans to attack him. He also reveals that he and Wayne had used Arkham Asylum, an ailing mental institution, to get rid of people privy to their activities.

When Penguin and the Children of Arkham attack the Mayoral debate, Batman is forced to make an alliance with Catwoman to stop them. During the attack, Penguin unveils their leader, Lady Arkham, injects Dent and Hill with the drug, and unveils evidence of Thomas Wayne committing his mother to Arkham. The Children of Arkham escape, releasing a list of names of people committed by Thomas to Arkham unlawfully, killing Hill, and disfiguring Harvey if the player chose not to intervene. With the GCPD struggling against the Children of Arkham, Gordon calls an alliance with Batman. Harvey is also sworn in as the new mayor but begins to exhibit signs of an aggressive split personality. Due to the allegations, Bruce is forced to step down as CEO of Wayne Enterprises, with Penguin replacing his position. Through Vale, Batman learns the Children of Arkham are operating out of a Sky Train Depot and stops a planned attack. During this, he is injured while fighting Lady Arkham. While staying at Selina's apartment to recover, Harvey discovers them and, believing them to be romantically tied, relinquishes control to his split-personality, "Two-Face". At a press conference announcing his resignation, Bruce is injected with the drug by Vale, who reveals herself to be Lady Arkham. Using the drug's influence, she goads him into attacking Penguin.

Committed to Arkham Asylum by Two-Face, Bruce meets and allies himself with a mysterious patient named "John Doe". Doe reveals Vale's identity as a member of the Arkham family, whose parents were murdered by Thomas to keep his actions hidden, and sets up a fight to get Bruce bailed out, advising that he investigates the Vales. After curing himself of the drug's influence, Batman discovers that Vale murdered her adoptive parents in order to use her father's company to store the drugs. After Batman survives an attack orchestrated by Penguin and relays the information to the GCPD, Two-Face, using a private army, blows up the warehouse and declares martial law. After discovering Penguin is hacking his tech, Batman is forced to choose whether to stop him and the Children of Arkham or Two-Face and his enforcers. Regardless of the choice, both are eventually subdued.

After assisting in the capture of either Harvey or Penguin, Bruce's public image begins to recover and he is reinstated at Wayne Enterprises. Selina leaves Gotham City after stealing a prototype from the company's R&D labs, though is forced to give it back after being caught by Bruce. Returning to Wayne Manor after receiving a call from Alfred, Bruce finds that the Children of Arkham had broken in and kidnapped Alfred. Using clues he finds in a message left by the group, Bruce discovers their new hideout and investigates as Batman. Upon arrival, he finds the Children of Arkham fled but discovers their plans to release the inmates of Arkham. Arriving at the asylum just as they release the inmates, Batman fights through the riots and helps the GCPD gain control. Pursuing Lady Arkham through the catacombs, he manages to rescue Alfred and defeat her. After the fight, Vale is apparently killed as she attempts to escape the collapsing chamber.

In the aftermath, Gordon is promoted to the Acting Police Commissioner to replace his deceased predecessor and plans to give a public speech regarding the incident. At Alfred's behest, Bruce attends the speech, either as himself or as Batman. An assassin launches an attack at the event but is quickly subdued. It is then revealed John Doe is watching the event live on television, who formulates a plan for the future.

== Development ==
Kevin Bruner said that the game is similar in maturity to their previous titles The Wolf Among Us and The Walking Dead. The game was rendered using a "non-photorealistic" style inspired by comic artists Jim Lee, Greg Capullo, and Neal Adams. To meet this, Telltale updated its game engine, the Telltale Tool, to be able to produce improved rendering results. While some improvements in the Tool were made for The Walking Dead: Michonne to include physics-based modeling and support for DirectX 11, Batman featured the full implementation of the new Tool. However, its development schedule was rushed, leading to some initial bugs on release, some of which were fixed a few weeks later.

=== Shadows Edition ===
Following Telltale Games' closure in 2018, some of the studio's games were acquired by Athlon Games. A new Telltale Games was reformed by LCG Entertainment in 2019. Telltale: Batman Shadows Edition has both of the Telltale Batman games, which includes a special noir-like filter the user can apply to the game. This edition was released on December 17, 2019 for Windows and Xbox One users, with other platforms to follow. Owners of either original game on any platform could upgrade to this version by purchasing a piece of downloadable content.

== Episodes ==
The game was separated into five episodes, released in approximately monthly intervals for mobile devices, personal computers, and PlayStation and Xbox consoles. The version of the series for the Nintendo Switch was released on November 14, 2017.

No. overall	No. in season	Title	Directed by	Written by	Original release date
1	1	"Realm of Shadows"	Kent Mudle	Zack Keller, Patrick Kevin Day, Shanon Ingles, Nicole Martinez, & James Windeler	August 2, 2016
Bruce Wayne navigates the treacherous waters of Gotham politics as a series of shocking allegations surface, while Batman confronts Gotham's most notorious crime boss, Carmine Falcone.
2	2	"Children of Arkham"	Jonathan Stauder	James Windeler, Patrick Day, Andrew Hanson, Shanon Ingles, & Meghan Thornton	September 20, 2016
As Bruce shifts through the secrets his parents left behind, Batman escalates the fight against crime and corruption throughout Gotham, while an old friend becomes a dangerous new adversary.
3	3	"New World Order"	Jason Pyke	Nicole Martinez, Meredith Ainsworth, Patrick Kevin Day, & Jessica Krause	October 25, 2016
As his life crumbles around him, Bruce fights a losing battle to both maintain control of his business empire and clear the Wayne family name, while Batman delves deeper into unraveling the mysteries surrounding his new foes.
4	4	"Guardian of Gotham"	Mark Droste	Eric Stirpe, Patrick Kevin Day, Shanon Ingles, & Luke McMullen	November 22, 2016
After being committed to Arkham Asylum, Bruce and Batman must forge new alliances to protect the innocent and fight back against Penguin's takeover of Wayne Enterprises, Lady Arkham's chaos, and Two-Face's increasing recklessness.
5	5	"City of Light"	Kent Mudle	Meghan Thornton, Meredith Ainsworth, & James Windeler	December 13, 2016
As the battle for control of Gotham reaches a fevered pitch, Bruce discovers a renewed sense of purpose and Batman finds himself pushed to the limits in a desperate effort to restore order.

== Reception ==
Aggregate review scores
Game	Metacritic
Complete Season	(PC) 64/100 (PS4) 68/100 (XONE) 67/100 (Switch) 72/100; 49% recommend(OpenCritic)
Episode 1: Realm of Shadows	(PC) 74 (PS4) 70 (XONE) 65
Episode 2: Children of Arkham	(PC) 73 (PS4) 66 (XONE) 83
Episode 3: New World Order	(PC) 73 (PS4) 74 (XONE) 73
Episode 4: Guardian of Gotham	(PC) 73 (PS4) 73 (XONE) 75
Episode 5: City of Light	(PC) 75 (PS4) 67 (XONE) 76

Batman: The Telltale Series received a mixed reception from critics. Critics praised Telltale's updated engine, the action sequences, atmosphere, and the portrayal of the titular character, but the storytelling and presence of various technical issues were criticized.

=== Episode 1: Realm of Shadows ===
Aggregating review website Metacritic gave the Microsoft Windows version 74/100 based on 39 reviews, the PlayStation 4 version 70/100 based on 22 reviews and the Xbox One version 65/100 based on 15 reviews.

=== Episode 2: Children of Arkham ===
Aggregating review website Metacritic gave the Microsoft Windows version 73/100 based on 20 reviews, the PlayStation 4 version 66/100 based on 13 reviews and the Xbox One version 83/100 based on 8 reviews.

=== Episode 3: New World Order ===
Aggregating review website Metacritic gave the Microsoft Windows version 73/100 based on 16 reviews, the PlayStation 4 version 74/100 based on 11 reviews and the Xbox One version 73/100 based on 7 reviews.

=== Episode 4: Guardian of Gotham ===
Aggregating review website Metacritic gave the Microsoft Windows version 73/100 based on 11 reviews, the PlayStation 4 version 73/100 based on 12 reviews and the Xbox One version 75/100 based on 7 reviews.

=== Episode 5: City of Light ===
Aggregating review website Metacritic gave the Microsoft Windows version 75/100 based on 14 reviews, the PlayStation 4 version 67/100 based on 12 reviews and the Xbox One version 76/100 based on 7 reviews.

== Sequel ==
A sequel, titled Batman: The Enemy Within, launched on August 8, 2017, for PC, consoles, and mobile devices. The season focuses on Batman facing "John Doe", who has joined a criminal organization called "The Pact" consisting of supervillains such as Riddler, Harley Quinn, Bane, and Mr. Freeze as Bruce Wayne / Batman must work with both the Gotham City Police Department and the "Agency" led by Amanda Waller. While it is a standalone title and does not require the first game, players' choices in the first game can influence the story in The Enemy Within.
