= Bone: Out from Boneville =

- Developer: Telltale Games
- Publisher: Telltale Games
- Designers: Dave Grossman; Heather Logas
- Composer: Jared Emerson-Johnson
- Engine: Telltale Tool
- Platforms: Microsoft Windows; Mac OS X
- Release: Windows; NA: September 15, 2005; EU: May 18, 2007; Mac OS X; WW: October 13, 2006; Steam; NA: June 17, 2008
- Genre: Adventure
- Mode: Single-player

Bone: Out from Boneville is an episodic adventure game by Telltale Games. It was Telltale's first adventure game, and their second game overall, following Telltale Texas Hold'em. A Mac port of the game was released on October 13, 2006, ported by Vanbrio.

It was released for Microsoft Windows in September 2005 after around seven months in production. The game is based on Out from Boneville, the first volume of the Bone comic series by Jeff Smith. It follows the adventures of Fone Bone and his two cousins, Phoney Bone and Smiley Bone (the first two of which are both playable characters).

== Plot ==
Bone: Out from Boneville screenshot where Fone Bone is talking to the Great Red Dragon

At the beginning of the game, Fone Bone, Phoney Bone, and Smiley Bone have been run out of their hometown of Boneville due to one of Phoney Bone's schemes of robbing. They find themselves lost in the desert with only a mysterious map to help them figure out where they are. The cousins are separated when a swarm of locusts descends upon them. The player must then help Fone Bone and Phoney Bone explore a mysterious valley to find their cousin Smiley. In the process, they make friends with a tiny bug named Ted, a beautiful girl named Thorn, her energetic grandmother Gran'ma Ben, and a trio of playful 'possum kids. The sinister rat creatures are always on their tails but the enigmatic Red Dragon keeps them at bay.

== Reception ==
The game received "average" reviews according to the review aggregation website Metacritic.

Reception

Aggregate score
| Aggregator | Score |
|---|---|
| Metacritic | 68/100 |

Review scores
| Publication | Score |
|---|---|
| Adventure Gamers | 3.5/5 |
| Computer Gaming World | 3/5 |
| Eurogamer | 6/10 |
| GamesRadar+ | 4/5 |
| GameZone | 7/10 |
| IGN | 5.9/10 |
| PC Format | 62% |
| PC Gamer (UK) | 76% |
| PC Gamer (US) | 62% |
| PC Zone | 57% |

GamesRadar said the game was "probably too lightweight, too easy and unsophisticated for most adventure gamers... but don't hold that against it". PC Zone said that the game "creates a warm feeling that doesn't provide belly-laughs, but at least fixes you up with a permanent half-grin". However, PopMatters gave it four stars out of 10 and stated that the game "isn't all that dissimilar from older PC adventure games: for the most part it's a one-click interface; one clicks on objects and characters to interact with them. There are also several minigame-style segments: a pair of chase sequences, a logic puzzle, a hide-and-seek sequence. The unfortunate thing is that none of this is particularly fun". In PC Gamer US, Chuck Osborn wrote: "Newcomers to Bone are better off putting their money toward the collected graphic novel". He criticized its high cost and short playtime.
