= AdHoc Studio =

American video game developer

- Type: Private
- Industry: Video games
- Founded: 2018; 8 years ago
- Founders: Michael Choung; Nick Herman; Dennis Lenart; Pierre Shorette
- Headquarters: Los Angeles, California, United States
- Products: Dispatch
- Number of employees: ~30 (2024)
- Website: adhocstudio.com

AdHoc Studio is an American video game developer founded in 2018 by industry veterans from Telltale Games, Ubisoft, and Night School Studio; namely, Telltale alumni Michael Choung, Nick Herman, Dennis Lenart, and Pierre Shorette. The studio is best known for developing Dispatch (2025).

== History ==
After their time with Telltale Games, then Ubisoft and Night School Studio, AdHoc Studio was formed in 2018 by Michael Choung, Nick Herman, Dennis Lenart, and Pierre Shorette. Their team has been the creative force behind some of Telltale's most successful games, such as The Walking Dead, The Wolf Among Us, and Tales from the Borderlands. The team's stated goal is to "carry the interactive narrative torch into the future".

After the sudden closure of Telltale Games in October 2018, the studio was revived after its assets were purchased by LCG Entertainment in August 2019. Now doing business as Telltale Games, LCG re-acquired the video game rights to DC Comics properties such as Fables (The Wolf Among Us) and Batman. Since AdHoc Studio was partially founded by Herman, Lenart, and Shorette, the creatives behind the first episode of The Wolf Among Us, the new Telltale Games approached the team to help make a sequel. Following the game's cancellation under the original Telltale, The Wolf Among Us 2 was re-announced at The Game Awards 2019. After writing an 800-page script, prototyping, and shooting scenes for The Wolf Among Us 2, AdHoc ran into disagreements with the new Telltale Games and grew frustrated of being work for hire, so they pulled out of the project.

In March 2023, a re-release of the 2010 indie game Cart Life was listed on Steam, to be published by AdHoc Studio. The game was set to be released in 2023, but in a forum post in 2024, the game's creator announced that the project was cancelled.

At The Game Awards 2024, AdHoc announced their first original title, Dispatch. The narrative-focused adventure game follows former superhero Robert Robertson, voiced by Breaking Bad actor Aaron Paul, who has to take a job as a dispatcher for superheroes after his mecha suit was destroyed. The game's voice cast also includes Jeffrey Wright, Laura Bailey, and Matthew Mercer in supporting roles. Dispatch was originally supposed to be a live action project inspired by ESPN's This Is SportsCenter commercials, but it was scrapped due to the COVID-19 pandemic, and later revived as a video game. Dispatch was self-published by AdHoc and released episodically on PlayStation 5 and Windows throughout October and November 2025 to generally favorable reviews. Nintendo Switch and Nintendo Switch 2 versions were released on January 28, 2026. An Xbox Series X/S version was released on July 29, 2026. Android and iOS versions are scheduled to be released on December 9, 2026. The game has sold over 5 million copies.

In July 2025, Critical Role Productions announced a partnership with AdHoc Studio to make a video game set in Critical Role's world of Exandria, being similar in concept to Dispatch. The partnership also includes Dispatch merchandise, tabletop games, and an animated series.

In November 2025, Nick Herman revealed to Bloomberg News that while he, Pierre Shorette, and Dennis Lenart were at Ubisoft, they worked on a Tom Clancy's Splinter Cell game that was never released. After they left the company, the project was rebooted multiple times until it eventually became XDefiant, which shut down only a year after release.

In September 2026, PlayStation Studios developer Firesprite announced that they're partnering with AdHoc Studio for the story of the upcoming video game Until Dawn 2, which is scheduled to release for PlayStation 5 on January 28, 2027.

== Games developed ==
Year	Title	Platform(s)	Publisher	Note(s)
2025	Dispatch	PlayStation 5, Windows, Nintendo Switch, Nintendo Switch 2, Xbox Series X/S, Android, iOS	AdHoc Studio	
2027	Until Dawn 2	PlayStation 5	Sony Interactive Entertainment	Story co-development with Firesprite
TBA	Project Exandria (working title)	TBA	Critical Role Productions, AdHoc Studio	
