= Straandlooper =

Animation studio in Northern Ireland

- Industry: Video games, animation
- Headquarters: Donaghadee, Northern Ireland
- Products: Cartoon series, graphic adventure games
- Number of employees: 4

Straandlooper is an animation studio and video game developer based in Donaghadee, Northern Ireland. The studio was founded in January 2008 by Richard Morss, Alastair McIlwain and Tim Bryans. They developed the episodic video game for iPhone, Hector: Badge of Carnage, which is based on their character Hector: Fat Arse of the Law. Straandlooper is notable for being Northern Ireland's first animation studio to produce a television series for the international market. As a video game developer, they are notable for being the first company where Telltale Games took on a publishing role, rather than a directing role. Telltale funded the development of the final two episodes of Hector: Badge of Carnage and published all three episodes on additional platforms, in addition to iOS.

== Television ==
Lifeboat Luke is a television program aimed at 4 to 7-year-old children inspired by the Donaghadee RNLI lifeboat. It is a partnership between Straandlooper and the Royal National Lifeboat Institution, and is Northern Ireland's first domestically produced animated TV series for the international market.

== Video games ==
Hector: Badge of Carnage is a trilogy of point-and-click adventure games. It features adult humor, and is about a shady detective character called "Hector: Fat Arse of the Law". It is developed by Straandlooper, and published by Telltale Games in Telltale's first role as an external publisher.
