= Telltale Games (2018–present) =

American video game company

LCG Entertainment, Inc.
- Trade name: Telltale Games
- Type: Private
- Industry: Video games
- Predecessor: Telltale Games
- Founded: December 27, 2018; 7 years ago
- Founders: Jamie Ottilie; Brian Waddle
- Headquarters: Malibu, California, United States
- Key people: Jamie Ottilie (CEO); Brian Waddle (CRO)
- Number of employees: ≈40 (2023)
- Subsidiaries: Flavourworks
- Website: telltale.com

LCG Entertainment, Inc., doing business as Telltale Games, is an American video game developer and publisher based in Malibu, California. The company was established after the original Telltale Games filed for assignment in October 2018 and were forced to shut down and sell off assets. LCG Entertainment had been able to acquire the rights to much of the original Telltale intellectual property (IP), including branding, games, and game licenses, and announced in August 2019 they would be bringing the old Telltale Games titles back.

== History ==
=== Founding ===
The original Telltale Games had become an established studio in producing episodic adventure games. While its earlier titles were modest successes, the studio had become successful with its release of the licensed property The Walking Dead in 2012. The Walking Dead helped Telltale establish major licenses from other franchises, among which included Batman and the Fables comic.

While the studio continued to build on its successes, the period leading up to 2016 created a lot of internal strife within Telltale, focusing on quantity of titles released over quality, and led to underperforming sales of hastily produced titles. A major shift in leadership occurred in 2017 to try to refocus the company on improving the quality, with The Walking Dead: The Final Season (the fourth and final in the series) aimed to demonstrate this new approach while the company worked on improving their financial situation. However, after a few major deals fell through in September 2018, Telltale announced its immediate closure, cancelling all current projects, and by October 2018, had filed for assignment. Several of the licensed properties were taken back by the IP owners; notably The Walking Dead games were acquired by Skybound Entertainment, and the company brought in much of the former Telltale staff to complete The Final Season in 2019.

LCG Entertainment was incorporated under the Delaware General Corporation Law on December 27, 2018, with Jamie Ottilie and Brian Waddle acting as chief executive officer and chief revenue officer, respectively. In February 2019, the company started to negotiate with Sherwood Partners, the company managing the liquidation of Telltale's properties, to acquire much of remaining Telltale licenses and games. Negotiations took over six months, complicated by the number of companies involved in the IP rights. LCG gained a number of investments to help secure the purchase, including Athlon Games and video game industry figures Chris Kingsley, Lyle Hall, and Tobias Sjögren. The acquisition was completed by August 2019. Athlon Games also became a shareholder in the company as part of the deal. In February 2023, Telltale raised $8 million in funding from Hiro Capital and Skybound Entertainment.

On August 28, 2019, LCG publicly announced the acquisition of much of the Telltale Games assets, and that it would be doing business as Telltale Games in the future. Among the company's plans were to republish the back catalog of Telltale Games they had acquired, working with Athlon Games as a publishing partner. Subsequently, the company took over the current publishing support of those games it has acquired the license to for digital platforms such as Steam.

Some former employees of the original Telltale Games believed the new company should pay off all the former company's debts, while others called for a boycott of the new company's games. Ottilie stressed that he had no ties with any of the former Telltale management, nor was in a financial position to meet some of these demands, stating "we cannot right the wrongs of the former company". The company's goal was to start small with a staff of about 30 to 35 people by the end of 2020, using freelancing and outsource contracting until the company established itself, and then expand out. Ottilie asked critics to give them a chance, "Give us some time to ramp up and then judge us by the work we do, not by a past over which we had no part or control." To avoid the issues that plagued the former Telltale, Ottilie said that they will be making sure their business practices are sustainable, not growing too fast to be able to manage costs better. The new company wants to avoid a crunch time environment, "taking a measured and methodical approach to growth in order to ensure we can provide a stable, non-crunch work environment. We are building this into our culture from the outset."

Ottilie also said that while they plan to stay with the episodic release format established by the original Telltale, that in terms of development, they will see such series as a full game from the development side: "If we do release the game in episodes, all of them will be ready before the first one hits the store."

=== Publishing and development ===
While licenses for games and planned games like The Walking Dead and Stranger Things have since reverted to their original owners, the new Telltale retains licenses for The Wolf Among Us and Batman, as well as the intellectual property for Puzzle Agent. The new Telltale announced its first two new releases in December 2019. The first was a rerelease of Batman: The Telltale Series and Batman: The Enemy Within with a new "Shadows Edition", first released in December 2019. This included both games and added a new noir-like graphics filter, among other quality-of-life improvements. The added filter was also made available as paid downloadable content for those that already owned the game. The second announcement was made at The Game Awards 2019 for The Wolf Among Us 2, a sequel to The Wolf Among Us. While the old Telltale had planned and started work on a sequel to the game, all work had been cancelled when the company closed down. For the revived sequel, the new Telltale brought on AdHoc Studio, a studio formed by former members from Telltale, who will focus on the game's narrative and cinematics, while Telltale will handle the gameplay and transition to the Unreal Engine.

In December 2021, at The Game Awards 2021, Telltale Games were announced to be co-developing The Expanse: A Telltale Series with Deck Nine. The Expanse: A Telltale Series released its first episode in July 2023 with new episodes coming bi-weekly through the fifth and final episode in September while the Archangel DLC episode was released in November. A Nintendo Switch version was released in April 2026.

In August 2023, Telltale acquired Flavourworks, a video game studio known for their interactive film video games like Erica; the company's CEO Zachary Slatter would become Telltale's managing director for Europe. In October 2023, Telltale confirmed they had laid off some of their employees "due to current market conditions", but that planned games still remain in production.

In 2023, while working on The Wolf Among Us 2, AdHoc Studio pulled out of development following disagreements with Telltale regarding creative control, after having written the game's full script during the prototyping stage of the project. AdHoc then shifted their focus to continuing development of their own internal game, Dispatch. The status of AdHoc's contributions to the development of The Wolf Among Us 2 remains unknown to the studio.

== Games ==
Title	Developer(s)	Release	# of episodes	Platform(s)
Batman: Shadows Edition	Telltale Games	December 17, 2019	10 episodes (Note: Includes all episodes from Batman: The Telltale Series and Batman: The Enemy Within, as well as "Shadows Mode", which recolors the games with a noir palette)	Microsoft Windows, Nintendo Switch, PlayStation 4, Xbox One
The Expanse: A Telltale Series	Telltale Games; Deck Nine	July 27, 2023–September 21, 2023; November 20, 2023 (Archangel)	5 episodes Standalone episode (Archangel)	Microsoft Windows, Nintendo Switch, PlayStation 4, PlayStation 5, Xbox One, Xbox Series X/S
The Wolf Among Us Remastered	Telltale Games; Trick Studios	October 29, 2026	5 episodes	Microsoft Windows, Nintendo Switch, PlayStation 5, Xbox One
The Wolf Among Us 2 (Note: The original The Wolf Among Us sequel was cancelled with Telltale's closure in 2018. LCG Entertainment developed The Wolf Among Us 2 after purchasing Telltale's brand name and assets. The sequel uses none of the work from the former Telltale Games before its closure.)	Telltale Games; Trick Studios	2027	5 episodes	Microsoft Windows, Nintendo Switch, Nintendo Switch 2, PlayStation 5, Xbox One, Xbox Series X/S

=== Acquisitions ===
As part of the asset acquisition, LCG Entertainment obtained the rights to sell part of Telltale Games's back catalog on digital platforms. The remaining rights reverted to their original rights holders.

Title	Original release	# of episodes	Platform(s)
Telltale Texas Hold'em	February 11, 2005	Standalone game	Steam
Wallace & Gromit's Grand Adventures	March 24, 2009—July 30, 2009	4 episodes	Steam, Epic Games Store
Tales of Monkey Island	July 7, 2009—December 8, 2009	5 episodes	Steam, Epic Games Store, iOS
Hector: Badge of Carnage	June 2, 2010—September 22, 2011	3 episodes	Steam, Epic Games Store
Puzzle Agent	June 30, 2010	Standalone game	Steam, Epic Games Store
Puzzle Agent 2	June 30, 2011	Standalone game	Steam, iOS
The Wolf Among Us	October 11, 2013—July 8, 2014	5 episodes	Steam, Epic Games Store, Google Play, PlayStation Store, Microsoft Store
Batman: The Telltale Series	August 2, 2016—December 13, 2016	5 episodes	Steam, Google Play, PlayStation Store, Microsoft Store, Nintendo eShop
Batman: The Enemy Within	August 8, 2017—March 27, 2018	5 episodes	Steam, Google Play, PlayStation Store, Microsoft Store, Nintendo eShop
