= Hector: Badge of Carnage =

- Developer: Straandlooper
- Publisher: Telltale Games
- Designers: Dean Burke; Kevin Beimers
- Engine: Telltale Tool
- Platforms: iOS, Microsoft Windows, OS X
- Release: Episode 1: June 2, 2010 (iOS) April 27, 2011 (PC & Mac) May 12, 2011 (iOS: HD); Episode 2: August 25, 2011; Episode 3: September 22, 2011
- Genre: Graphic adventure
- Mode: Single-player

Hector: Badge of Carnage is an episodic graphic adventure based on the adventures of Hector, a hard-nosed and soft-bellied Detective Inspector. It was created by Dean Burke, developed by Straandlooper and published by Telltale Games beginning in 2010.

== Synopsis ==
=== Characters ===
- Hector: Fat Arse of the Law, is a hard-nosed and soft-bellied Detective Inspector with the Clappers Wreake Police Department. Violent, drunken, vulgar, with an unhealthy taste for all things criminal, corrupt or smothered in curry sauce. His philosophy is 'Everyone is Guilty'. Hector struggles to eliminate the plague of warped, perverse killers infesting the damp, sweaty corners of Clappers Wreake, crime capital of England, and the town that took the 'Great' out of Britain.
- Lambert, is an enduring, thick-as-a-stick assistant to DI Hector. He is friendly, kind and excessively naive.
- Meeks, Chief Superintendent and Hector's boss. Contrary to his name, he is confident and authoritative, but is also of flexible morality.
- Jarvis, Assistant to Meeks.

=== Plot ===
Episode 1: We Negotiate with Terrorists

Hector is an overweight, crude, alcoholic cop, who gets called for duty one day after a terrorist has taken hostages in a building of a small Midlands town of Clappers Wreake, and proceeded to kill off a number of hostage negotiators with a sniper rifle. After freeing himself from a holding cell with a hangover and resurrecting his bucket-of-bolts duty vehicle, he arrives on the scene and enters negotiations with the perpetrator: The terrorist, apparently appalled by the depths Clappers Wreake has sunk to, blames the police for the dismal state of the town, and wants Hector to run errands in attempt to polish the neighborhood up. These errands include fixing the town clock, providing a large sum of donation to the Clappers Wreake Preservation Society tourist information desk, and shutting down a pornography store. Hector reluctantly agrees, after finding out that after the Policeman's Ball budget has eaten into the hostage negotiation funds, the police can no longer fund ransoms.

After completing the errands, Hector returns to find the terrorist rejoicing over his success in fixing the town - and continuing his list of demands, much to the force's chagrin. Hector then attempts to infiltrate the building by taking the job of delivering food for the hostages. Upon entering the building, he finds nothing but a laptop connected to a sniper rifle, which promptly turns around and aims at him. The first episode ends with a cliffhanger as the police outside only hear a gunshot coming from the building.

Episode 2: Senseless Acts of Justice

Hector, having survived the sentry sniper rifle's shot, quickly tricks the rifle into shooting the laptop, hence disarming it. However, when leaving the room, he encounters copious amounts of explosives which immediately blow the building up. The armed forces outside briefly commemorate him, and promptly leave. Lambert, refusing to give up, gets in contact with Hector and the two proceed to blow the building's sewage pipe up to get Hector out of the rubble. After collecting a variety of physical evidence, Hector sets off to track down his clues, during which process he burns down a church-turned-strip-club and slips an entire restaurant the roofies. He eventually finds a postal slip in the supposed terrorist's home with the initials B.N., and when opening a package that contains a shipment of Clappers Wreake Preservation Society "Who Cares?" badges, finally realizes the identity of the terrorist: Barnsley Noble, the founder of the Clappers Wreake Preservation Society, who he had to help out financially in the previous episode. When Lambert and Hector arrive to Barnsley's previous location outside the park, they find an open manhole cover. After they descend, they find Barnsley secret plans and a ringing phone. Upon answering the phone, Barnsley knocks both of them out cold from behind.

Episode 3: Beyond Reasonable Doom

Hector and Lambert wake up in a large septic-tank-turned-death-trap set by Barnsley. After escaping, they come upon a laboratory, where they observe a common badger wearing a device turning it into a ravaging beast upon hearing a simple five-note bell jingle. After deducing that Barnsley probably wants to strike the town with a bio-chemical attack (using a chemical called Arsenol, which turns creatures feral), they quickly fix a nearby combine harvester to hitch a ride back to town. Upon arriving to "Clapfest", the local fair, and entering Lambert to the weirdo-contest to gain access to the stage PA, they're told that the town clock's new jingle will be unveiled at 10 o'clock: the same 5 note jingle (B-A-D-G-E, which causes Hector to realise the "Who Cares?" badges the entire town is wearing are the chemical bombs) that triggered the badger kill-crazy. Hector infiltrates the clock tower and corners Barnsley, who has a dead man's switch on the detonator, and reveals that he forced Hector to blow up the local porn shop (in Episode 1) to be able to utilize a large vibrator which he uses to amplify the bell sound. After distracting Barnsley, Hector plants an explosive extracted from the clockmaster's skull to blow the clocktower up before the last note is played. Barnsley, however, reveals an enormous inflatable castle filled with Arsenol, which Hector eventually fills with helium and sets free to keep it far away from town. When Barnsley escapes by riding the flying castle, and takes Lambert hostage, Hector takes the giant vibrator and shoots the castle down with it utilizing a giant pair of underpants. The Arsenol in the castle turns Lambert into a giant raging monster, while Barnsley swallows the antidote, which Hector recovers after forcing Barnsley to regurgitate it. Hector then turns Lambert back into his normal self, and launches Barnsley out of a carousel, after which he's devoured by the psycho-badger Hector encountered earlier.

== Development ==
The first episode was initially developed for Apple's iPhone and iPod Touch devices by Dean Burke and Kevin Beimers at Straandlooper Animation studios in Northern Ireland. All voices in the game are provided by producer Richard Morss.

In February 2011, it was revealed that the trilogy would be published by Telltale Games, and released for multiple platforms. The first episode was converted to the Telltale Tool by Telltale's in-house development team, and released for PC and Mac on April 27, 2011. An iPad release followed on May 12, 2011. The remaining two episodes were released in the fall.

== Reception ==
AppSafari gave the game 5 out of 5 in their review, commenting that "Hector is the gleefully unrefined anti-hero of one of the best point-and-click adventure games in the App Store." Andrew Podolsky from SlideToPlay praised the cutscenes and the dialogue. AdventureGamers.com summarized its review: "Stylish art and animation; fun puzzles; excellent production qualities all around; genuinely funny." AppModo also praised the game as one which "physically cannot be missed to iPod and iPhone users. It is puzzling, one of the funniest games on the App Store."
