= The Wolf Among Us =

2013 video game

- Developer: Telltale Games
- Publisher: Telltale Games
- Directors: Nick Herman; Dennis Lenart; Jason Latino; Martin Montgomery; Kent Mudle; Vahram Antonian
- Producer: Chris Schroyer
- Designers: Ryan Kaufman; Joe Pinney; Aaron Casillas
- Programmers: Keenan Patterson; Jason Reis; David R. Chaverri
- Artist: David Bogan
- Writers: Pierre Shorette; Dave Grossman; Adam Hines; Dan Martin; Nicole Martinez
- Composer: Jared Emerson-Johnson
- Series: Fables
- Engine: Telltale Tool
- Platforms: Android; iOS; OS X; PlayStation 3; PlayStation 4; PlayStation Vita; Windows; Xbox 360; Xbox One
- Release: October 14, 2013 Episode 1: WW: October 11, 2013; WW: October 14, 2013 (OS X); NA: October 15, 2013 (PS3); EU: October 16, 2013 (PS3); AU: October 16, 2013 (PS3); WW: December 4, 2013 (iOS); Episode 2: WW: February 4, 2014; NA: February 4, 2014 (PS3); EU: February 5, 2014 (PS3); WW: February 5, 2014 (X360); Episode 3: WW: April 8, 2014; NA: April 8, 2014 (PS3); EU: April 9, 2014 (PS3); WW: April 9, 2014 (X360); WW: April 10, 2014 (iOS); Episode 4: WW: May 27, 2014; NA: May 27, 2014 (PS3); WW: May 28, 2014 (X360); WW: May 29, 2014 (IOS); EU: June 4, 2014 (PS3); Episode 5: WW: July 8, 2014; NA: July 8, 2014 (PS3); EU: July 9, 2014 (PS3); WW: July 9, 2014 (X360); WW: July 10, 2014 (iOS); Retail version: NA: November 4, 2014; EU: November 7, 2014
- Genres: Graphic adventure Interactive film
- Mode: Single-player

The Wolf Among Us is an episodic adventure game developed and published by Telltale Games. It is based on Bill Willingham's Fables comic book series, to which it serves as a prequel. The game consists of five episodes that were released throughout 2013 and 2014. Retail versions for the PlayStation 3, PlayStation 4, PlayStation Vita, Xbox 360, and Xbox One consoles were made available in November 2014. The game is set in Fabletown, a clandestine community within New York City consisting of fantastical characters from fairy tales, novels, and folklore, where sheriff Bigby Wolf must investigate a series of mysterious murders.

The Wolf Among Us received mostly positive reviews for its writing, atmosphere, and characterization, though it was criticized for technical issues and some aspects of the gameplay.

In July 2017, Telltale announced that a second season of The Wolf Among Us was scheduled for release in 2018, but Telltale eventually closed down for "insurmountable challenges" in 2018, with its assets being acquired by LCG Entertainment. One of the first original games from this new company, doing business as Telltale Games, will be a sequel to The Wolf Among Us, titled The Wolf Among Us 2, which is scheduled to be released in 2027.

== Gameplay ==
In-game conversations are presented in the form of dialogue trees.

The Wolf Among Us is a graphic adventure game, played from a third-person perspective. The player controls protagonist Bigby Wolf, who must investigate a series of mysterious murders. Throughout the game, the player explores various three-dimensional environments, such as apartment buildings and a bar. When exploring an environment, the player may find an object they can interact with; when this occurs, they must move the cursor over the object to select and examine it. Items of interest are stored in an inventory, and can be used later in the story. The player may also talk with non-player characters, and see the conversations presented in the form of dialogue trees. The dialogue options chosen during conversations will either have a positive or negative effect on how other characters view Bigby, and their perceptions will influence future events in the story. Some scenes are more action-oriented, forcing the player to respond to a series of quick time event (QTE) prompts. The player is not required to complete every QTE prompt, and skipping certain prompts may affect future events in the story.

== Synopsis ==
=== Setting and characters ===
The Wolf Among Us is set in the year 1986, nearly twenty years before the events of Fables. For years, many of the magical lands described in myth, legend, and folklore (known as The Homelands) have been occupied by an enigmatic tyrant known as the Adversary. To escape the Adversary's totalitarian regime, many of The Homelands inhabitants (collectively known as Fables) fled to colonial America, and created an enclave known as Fabletown, now located in modern-day Manhattan. To mask their presence from the native humans (referred to as "mundys"), all non-human Fables have to purchase an enchantment known as a "glamour", which allows them to appear human, otherwise they will be relocated to a rural community known as "The Farm".

The protagonist of The Wolf Among Us is Bigby Wolf (Adam Harrington), formerly the Big Bad Wolf. He is the sheriff of Fabletown, currently working at the "Business Office" under corrupt interim mayor Ichabod Crane (Roger L. Jackson), aided by Snow White (Erin Yvette) and the Magic Mirror (Gavin Hammon) in his investigation along with the help of Bufkin the winged monkey (Chuck Kourouklis) that manages Fabletown's records. Aristocrat Bluebeard (Dave Fennoy) also works at the Office though his motives are unclear. Bigby resides at the Woodlands apartments where Colin (Brian Sommer), one of the Three Little Pigs, occasionally crashes at his place. Beauty and the Beast (Melissa Hutchison and Gavin Hammon) are also residents of the Woodlands, though currently struggling with a troubled marriage. One of the Fables that Bigby frequently contacts is Mr. Toad (Chuck Kourouklis) and his son TJ (Melissa Hutchison), who live in a run-down apartment building nearby.

In the first episode, the player is introduced to The Woodsman (Adam Harrington), who lives in the same building as Mr. Toad. Standing in Bigby's way are Dee and Dum Tweedle (Gavin Hammon), twin private investigators and criminals. Bigby also encounters Holly (Janet Lipsey), a Troll who runs the Trip Trap bar, and barfly Grendel (Kid Beyond). The second episode introduces trickster and thief Jack Horner (Colin Benoit), Georgie Porgie (Kevin Howarth), a pimp and the owner of the Pudding & Pie strip club, along with prostitute Nerissa (Molly Benson), the former Little Mermaid, Vivian (Sandy Delonga), Georgie's lover, and Clever Hans (Ben Knoll), the club's bouncer. The third episode introduces the janitor Flycatcher (Dustin Rubin), the Crooked Man (Philip Banks), a loan shark with a large influence in Fabletown, Bloody Mary (Kat Cressida), a sadistic minion of the Crooked Man, and Aunty Greenleaf (Laura Bailey), a rogue witch who illegally sells cheap black-market glamours to Fables. The fourth episode introduces the Jersey Devil (Bobby Vickers), the manager of the Lucky Pawn shop and another minion of the Crooked Man; and Johann the butcher (Terry McGovern), the former owner of the Cut Above butcher shop who has been forced out of his business by the Crooked Man's henchmen.

=== Plot ===
This is a broad overview of the plot. Certain decisions made by the player will alter details of specific events.

Answering a call by Mr. Toad, Bigby Wolf arrives to find a prostitute being attacked by an intoxicated Woodsman, prompting him to intervene. After saving her, Bigby returns to the Woodlands to rest, only to later be awakened by Snow White, who finds the head of the prostitute on the Woodlands' doorstep. Investigating the clues left with the head, Bigby and Snow identify the prostitute as Faith, a Fable from Allerleirauh. They discover she and her husband, Prince Lawrence, had fallen in debt; as a result, Faith turned to prostitution to make ends meet. Bigby and Snow encounter Tweedledee and Tweedledum, who are also involved and briefly escape Bigby's pursuit. Later, when returning to the Woodlands, Bigby finds Snow's head placed on the doorstep, similarly to how Faith's was.

Bigby is taken in by the New York City Police Department for questioning, but Ichabod Crane uses a spell to erase all memories of the incident from the police and rescue Bigby. When returning to the Woodlands, they discover Snow is still alive; the "Snow" head and corpse actually belonged to a troll named Lily, using a clandestine yet ineffective form of glamour. Bigby follows the leads to Lily's workplace, the Pudding 'N Pie strip club, where Faith also worked. While club owner Georgie Porgie proves uncooperative, one of the dancers, Nerissa, subtly guides Bigby to a nearby hotel, where he comes across Lily's apparent murder scene and photographic evidence of Crane engaging in sexual acts with Lily while she was glamoured as Snow. Snow and Bigby return to the Woodlands to find Crane is gone, having destroyed the Magic Mirror and taken one shard to avoid being tracked down.

Investigations into Crane reveal that he had been embezzling money from Fabletown for years to pay off outstanding debts to a loan shark known as the Crooked Man. After tracking down one of the Crooked Man's collaborators, the clandestine witch Aunty Greenleaf, Bigby and Snow corner and detain Crane at the Pudding 'N Pie, but are intercepted by the Crooked Man's henchmen—the Tweedles and Bloody Mary— who near-fatally injure Bigby, forcing Snow to surrender Crane and save Bigby's life.

Shifting his attention to the Crooked Man, Bigby uncovers an illegal glamour manufacturing operation that uses the Pudding 'N Pie girls for slave labor. He also comes across a pawn shop run by the Jersey Devil where he recovers the missing Magic Mirror shard. The mirror reveals the Crooked Man has a mobile lair, which Bigby races to and reaches in time. There, the Crooked Man exposes Georgie as Faith and Lily's murderer, and that Georgie "misinterpreted" his orders to deal with them when they plotted to leave his forced employ. Resisting arrest, Georgie is mortally wounded, but is rescued by his lover Vivian. Pursuing them back to the Pudding 'N Pie, Bigby corners Georgie and Vivian. Vivian admits to replicating the spell on her ribbon—one that forced obedience, silence, and decapitation upon attempted removal—to those of the other girls, and commits suicide by removing it.

Bigby tracks the Crooked Man to an abandoned foundry, where he is forced to turn to his true wolf form to finally kill Bloody Mary. He then corners the Crooked Man in his office. Later, some of the Fables start to question Bigby and Snow due to their previous actions. However, Nerissa is able to quell the tension when she reveals the Crooked Man's schemes.

In the aftermath, Bigby meets with Nerissa the next day. She confesses that in a panic, she exposed her, Lily, and Faith's plan to escape the Pudding 'N Pie to Georgie when she discovered Faith stole Crane's incriminating photo. She also confesses to having been the one who put Faith's head in the Woodlands' doorstep. Nerissa gives her farewell to Bigby, stating that "you're not as bad as everyone says you are". Once she leaves, Bigby wonders if Nerissa was actually Faith all along, and either follows her or lets her go.

== Episodes ==
Episodic releases for the Microsoft Windows, Xbox 360, OS X and PlayStation 3 platforms were released near-simultaneously within the same week; the iOS and PlayStation Vita episodic releases were expected to trail these by about a month or so.

No.	Title	Directed by	Written by	Original release date
1	"Faith"	Nick Herman and Dennis Lenart	Pierre Shorette	October 11, 2013
The first murder of a Fable in several years leads Bigby on the trail of a killer.
2	"Smoke and Mirrors"	Jason Latino	Dave Grossman; Adam Hines; Nicole Martinez	February 4, 2014
Bigby continues investigating for the 'serial killer' walking the streets of Fabletown. He also attempts to find answers from Faith's pimp: Georgie Porgie, and becomes more involved with Beauty and Beast's affairs.
3	"A Crooked Mile"	Martin Montgomery	Adam Hines; Nicole Martinez	April 8, 2014
Following a shocking revelation, Bigby pursues Ichabod Crane, who is now in hiding.
4	"In Sheep's Clothing"	Kent Mudle	Dan Martin	May 27, 2014
Bigby must delve into the criminal underworld to find the Crooked Man.
5	"Cry Wolf"	Vahram Antonian	Nicole Martinez; Adam Hines	July 8, 2014
Secrets are revealed and decisions are made as Bigby squares off against the Crooked Man, facing off against his deadliest agent, Bloody Mary and learns the full truth about his crimes against Fabletown.

== Development ==
In 2011, Telltale Games acquired licenses to develop video games based on two comic book series, The Walking Dead by Robert Kirkman, and Fables by Bill Willingham. This came around the same time that the television series The Walking Dead became critically successful, leading to Telltale to put much of their initial focus on developing The Walking Dead property through 2011 and 2012. This game was released in April 2012, and was a critical and commercial success for Telltale. With The Walking Dead shipping, the company then started working on their Fables title, but according to Telltale's Job Stauffer, they struggled with the narrative of the title over a year and a half. Stauffer said at one point, they found the game to be more of a comedy, but without much humorous substance and in an un-shippable state. Stauffer said that their team rallied together to refocus the game, delaying it from an early 2012 release to late 2012, and ultimately to October 2013 when it finally shipped. This did allow for Telltale to incorporate mechanics that had proven successful in The Walking Dead into their Fables game.

Due to these delays, Telltale re-announced the Fables game at the New York Comic Con in October 2012. The title of the game, The Wolf Among Us, was revealed in March 2013, and is based on the main character Bigby Wolf.

Pre-orders were made available on October 3, 2013, from Telltale Games and Steam. Those who pre-ordered through Telltale received a collector's DVD at the end of the season.

The game was initially released across five episodes from October 2013 to July 2014 for Microsoft Windows, PlayStation 3, and Xbox 360 platforms.

=== Release dates and platforms ===
- The Wolf Among Us was released on the Xbox 360, PC, and Mac worldwide on October 11, 2013.
- The digital download was released on October 11 worldwide for the Xbox 360, and for Microsoft Windows from the Telltale Games store. The PlayStation 3 version came on October 15 in North America.
- The digital download was released on October 14 worldwide for OS X from the Telltale Games store, after fixing an issue with the October 11th release build. It also became available through Steam for both PC and Mac.
- The digital download was released on October 15 for PlayStation 3 in North America and on October 16 in Europe and Australia.
- The iOS version was released worldwide on December 4 of the same year.
- The game was released on the PlayStation Vita, PlayStation 4, and Xbox One in November 2014, at both retail and digital stores in North America and Europe. In addition, the PlayStation 3 and Xbox 360 retail versions were also released in the same month.

A remastered version was released in October 2026.

== Reception ==
Aggregate review scores
Game	Metacritic
The Wolf Among Us	(PS4) 83/100 (X360) 83/100 (PC) 80/100
Episode 1 – Faith	(PS3) 85/100 (PC) 85/100 (iOS) 83/100 (X360) 82/100
Episode 2 – Smoke and Mirrors	(PS3) 82/100 (PC) 76/100 (X360) 73/100
Episode 3 – A Crooked Mile	(PS3) 82/100 (PC) 82/100 (X360) 77/100
Episode 4 – In Sheep's Clothing	(PC) 75/100 (X360) 74/100 (PS3) 69/100
Episode 5 – Cry Wolf	(X360) 85/100 (PC) 84/100 (PS3) 75/100

Reception

Aggregate score
Aggregator	Score
OpenCritic	96% recommend (Remastered) (Note: Based on 24 reviews.)

The Wolf Among Us received mostly positive reviews from critics. Praise was given to the game's story, action sequences, atmosphere, visual style and faithfulness to the source material while criticism was focused on its pacing and technical issues.

=== Episode 1 – Faith ===
Episode 1 – Faith received positive reviews from critics. Review aggregator website Metacritic gave the PlayStation 3 version 85/100, the PC version 85/100, and the Xbox 360 version 82/100.

=== Episode 2 – Smoke and Mirrors ===
Episode 2 – Smoke and Mirrors received mixed to positive reviews from critics. Metacritic gave the PlayStation 3 version 82/100, the PC version 76/100, and the Xbox 360 version 73/100.

=== Episode 3 – A Crooked Mile ===
Episode 3 – A Crooked Mile received positive reviews. Metacritic gave the PlayStation 3 version 82/100, the PC version 82/100, and the Xbox 360 version 77/100.

=== Episode 4 – In Sheep's Clothing ===
Episode 4 – In Sheep's Clothing received mixed to positive reviews from critics. Metacritic gave the PC version 75/100, the Xbox 360 version 74/100, and the PlayStation 3 version 69/100.

=== Episode 5 – Cry Wolf ===
Episode 5 – Cry Wolf received positive reviews from critics. Metacritic gave the PC version 84/100, the Xbox 360 version 85/100, and the PlayStation 3 version 75/100.

=== Awards ===
Award	Year of Ceremony	Category	Result	Ref(s)
17th Annual D.I.C.E. Awards	2013	D.I.C.E. Award for Mobile Game of the Year	Nominated	
18th Annual D.I.C.E. Awards	2014	D.I.C.E. Award for Outstanding Achievement in Story	Nominated	
18th Annual D.I.C.E. Awards	2014	D.I.C.E. Award for Adventure Game of the Year	Nominated	
British Academy Games Awards	2014	Story	Nominated	
British Academy Games Awards	2014	Performer (Adam Harrington as Bigby Wolf)	Nominated	
2014 National Academy of Video Game Trade Reviewers (NAVGTR)	2014	Direction in a Game Cinema	Won	
2014 National Academy of Video Game Trade Reviewers (NAVGTR)	2014	Writing in a Drama	Nominated	
2014 National Academy of Video Game Trade Reviewers (NAVGTR)	2014	Performance in a Drama, Lead	Nominated	
2014 National Academy of Video Game Trade Reviewers (NAVGTR)	2014	Original Dramatic Score, Franchise	Nominated	
2014 National Academy of Video Game Trade Reviewers (NAVGTR)	2014	Game	Nominated	
2014 National Academy of Video Game Trade Reviewers (NAVGTR)	2014	Original Adventure	Nominated	
2014 National Academy of Video Game Trade Reviewers (NAVGTR)	2014	Camera Direction in a Game Engine	Nominated	
2014 National Academy of Video Game Trade Reviewers (NAVGTR)	2014	Art Direction, Contemporary	Nominated	

At the 2014 National Academy of Video Game Trade Reviewers (NAVGTR) awards the game won Direction in a Game Cinema and received six nominations: Writing in a Drama (Pierre Shorette), Performance in a Drama, Lead (Adam Harrington), Original Dramatic Score, Franchise (Jared Emerson-Johnson), Game, Original Adventure (Joe Pinney), Camera Direction in a Game Engine (Dennis Lenart) and Art Direction, Contemporary (David Bogan).

== Legacy ==
=== Comic adaptation ===
A comic book adaptation of The Wolf Among Us was released in December 2014 by Vertigo Comics. The story was adapted for the comic by Lilah Sturges, who has previously written for the Fables series, and Dave Justus, staying otherwise true to the game's story but exploring some of the characters and back story in more depth.

=== Sequel ===
When The Wolf Among Us was completed by July 2014, Telltale had thought of doing a second season, but they had already committed to the projects leading to Tales from the Borderlands, Minecraft: Story Mode, and Game of Thrones. The company was aware of strong interest in a second season through the intervening years, and they were looking for the right time to develop it.

A second yet-to-be-named season was announced at San Diego Comic-Con 2017, and was originally set to be released in 2018 for personal computers, consoles, and mobile devices. Both Adam Harrington and Erin Yvette were to reprise their roles as Bigby and Snow White, respectively. Job Stauffer said that Season 2 would not resolve the apparent cliffhanger related to Nerissa's connection to Faith; he said that it was meant to be ending similar to a film noir work that made the viewer think about the implications, but never saw this themselves as a cliffhanger. Instead, Season 2 would have continued on with more narrative related to Bigby and Snow White. By May 2018, due to recent internal studio issues, Telltale pushed back the release of the sequel until 2019. In September, Telltale had a majority studio closure due to "insurmountable challenges", cancelling The Wolf Among Us's second season among other projects in development.

Upon Telltale's revival by LCG Entertainment, The Wolf Among Us was one of the titles reacquired by LCG, but no announcement was made at that time about the sequel. The company announced The Wolf Among Us 2 at The Game Awards 2019. The sequel was set to continue the events after the first game, though still remained as a prequel to the comic series. The game was being developed in association with AdHoc Studio, formed by former Telltale Games staff, who were focusing on the game's narrative and cinematic elements while Telltale were to implement the gameplay and other designs. In addition to returning Telltale staff, Harrington and Yvette were set to reprise their roles as Bigby and Snow White, respectively, and Emerson-Johnson was to compose music for the game. The game was being developed on the Unreal Engine, and was set to be released in an episodic approach. This sequel would be worked completely from scratch, using none of the ideas and initial work that had been done under the former Telltale banner before its closure. Unlike the past development cycle approach at the former Telltale where each episode was developed in a standalone fashion, all episodes of The Wolf Among Us 2 were being developed simultaneously.

However, in late 2025, AdHoc confirmed that they had left development of The Wolf Among Us 2 in 2023 following creative differences with Telltale. They also revealed that they had no idea of the state of the game at that point, or how much of their script was being used.

The game was reintroduced at Summer Game Fest 2026. It is scheduled to be released in 2027.

=== Remaster ===
In June 2026, Telltale Games announced The Wolf Among Us Remastered, a remaster of the original game co-published with PM Studios. Remastered was released on October 29, 2026, for PlayStation 5, Windows, and Xbox One, and includes all five episodes of the original game with updated visuals, audio, animation, interface elements, and bonus material. Remastered was also scheduled to be released for Nintendo Switch and Nintendo Switch 2, but it was delayed.
