= Telltale Games =

American video game developer (2004–2018)

Telltale Incorporated
- Trade name: Telltale Games
- Type: Private
- Industry: Video games
- Founded: July 2004; 22 years ago
- Founders: Kevin Bruner; Dan Connors; Troy Molander
- Defunct: October 11, 2018; 8 years ago
- Fate: General assignment
- Successor: Telltale Games (2018–present)
- Headquarters: San Rafael, California, US
- Key people: Dan Connors; (CEO; 2004–2015); Kevin Bruner; (CEO; 2015–2017); Pete Hawley; (CEO; 2017–2018)
- Website: telltale.com

Telltale Incorporated (trade name: Telltale Games) was an American video game developer based in San Rafael, California. The company was founded in July 2004 by former LucasArts developers Kevin Bruner, Dan Connors and Troy Molander, following LucasArts' decision to leave the adventure game genre. Telltale established itself to focus on adventure games using a novel episodic release schedule using digital distribution, creating its own game engine, the Telltale Tool, to support this. It closed in October 2018 after filing for bankruptcy protection.

Telltale's initial successes were with games using intellectual properties with small but dedicated fan bases including Sam & Max, Wallace & Gromit, Homestar Runner, and Bone. Around 2010, the studio gained more lucrative licensing opportunities in more mainstream properties such as Back to the Future, Jurassic Park, and Law & Order. Telltale's critical breakout game came in 2012's The Walking Dead, based on the comic book series of the same name. It introduced a more narrative-directed approach that diverged from the standard adventure game "point and click" gameplay. The Walking Dead gave players the ability to make choices that could affect how future events in the game or its sequels played out, effectively allowing players to craft their own personalized take on the offered story. Nearly all of Telltale's adventure games afterwards featured this player choice-driven approach. The Walking Dead was critically acclaimed and considered to have revitalized the adventure game genre since LucasArts' departure from it in 2004.

Telltale continued to expand with new licensing deals for episodic adventure games over the next few years, including for Minecraft, Game of Thrones, Guardians of the Galaxy, and Batman. However the rate of production created a "crunch time" culture behind the scenes, leaving poor company morale, little room for creativity to veer from the formula set by The Walking Dead or improvements on the Telltale Tool. A management shakeup occurred in early 2017, with CEO Bruner stepping down, and Pete Hawley, formerly of Zynga, brought in to fix Telltale's problems. Internal restructuring led to a layoff of 25% of the company's staff in November 2017, along with an emphasis to slow down game production to improve production quality, retire the Telltale Tool for a more standard game engine, and seek other lucrative properties to develop for. This resulted in an early 2018 deal with Netflix in which Telltale would adapt its Minecraft: Story Mode into an interactive program for the streaming service, and Netflix licensing the rights to Telltale for an adventure game based on its show Stranger Things.

In the midst of releasing The Walking Dead: The Final Season, the company was forced to initiate a "majority studio closure" after its last investor had pulled out of funding. Telltale announced on September 21, 2018, that it had let go of all but 25 of its staff as part of this closure, with the remaining skeleton crew completing specific obligations, such as finishing the Minecraft: Story Mode project porting to Netflix. Telltale Games filed for assignment in October 2018. Many assets were later acquired by LCG Entertainment, which revived the Telltale Games name as part of its business in August 2019, retaining many of the company's previous licenses and offering former staff freelance positions.

== History ==
=== Foundation and initial growth (2004–2010) ===
Telltale Games was founded in San Rafael, California, by Kevin Bruner, Dan Connors and Troy Molander, a group of former LucasArts employees who worked on the studio's adventure games. In March 2004, LucasArts recognized that there were "current market place realities and underlying economic considerations" that made adventure games too risky to release, and canceled work on two sequels of previous adventure games, Full Throttle 2 and Sam & Max: Freelance Police, as well as laying off many of those developers. Bruner, Connors and Molander were not among the layoffs, but felt that the change of direction at LucasArts was not favorable, and departed the company later that year to found Telltale Games in July 2004. The studio opening was announced on October 4. The name "Telltale" was selected by Bruner as the three envisioned themselves creating more adventure games but de-emphasizing puzzle elements in favor of narrative aspects, telling a tale to the user. Technology attorney Ira P. Rothken negotiated publishing and licensing deals for the company.

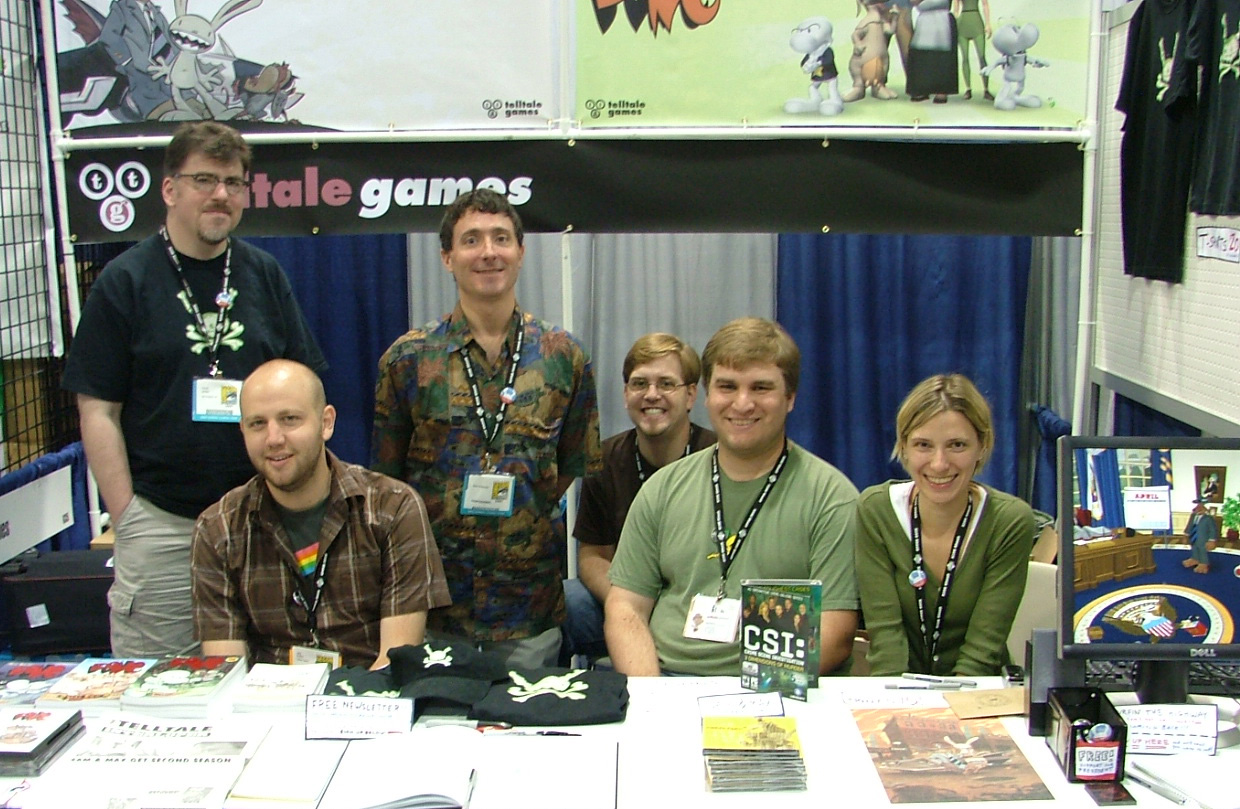
The team of Telltale Games at San Diego Comic-con in July 2007; from left to right: Chuck Jordan, Jake Rodkin, Dave Grossman, Daniel Farjam Herrera, Doug Tabacco, Emily Morganti, and also a demo version of Sam & Max Save the World

The company's initial goal was to develop a new Sam & Max game in an episodic format. Grossman said that Telltale identified that Sam & Max had a small but dedicated audience allowing it to develop a title that would be successful in reaching out to this group and not requiring it to seek out a bigger license that would have incurred more development costs. Developing a Sam & Max game required both development of tools to produce the game, and the license to make it. At the time of the studio's founding, the license for Sam & Max was still held by LucasArts, who refused to negotiate a deal nor license the work on Sam & Max: Freelance Police for Telltale to complete it. Telltale waited out the licensing period until around mid-2005, after which Steve Purcell, Sam & Max's creator, immediately offered the license to Telltale.

Until they could get to that point, the studio developed other games to bring in revenue and keep the studio afloat. On February 11, 2005, the company released their first game, Telltale Texas Hold'em, a poker card game simulator which was intended primarily to test the Telltale Tool, their in-house game engine. They used the license around Jeff Smith's Bone comic book series to test the episodic format. Though initially planned for a five-episode series, Telltale only released two episodes in 2005 and 2006 and the remaining episode had been canceled. Alongside Bone, Telltale developed a series of games for Ubisoft around the CSI television series, including CSI: 3 Dimensions of Murder, CSI: Hard Evidence, CSI: Deadly Intent, and CSI: Fatal Conspiracy; though these games were also developed as episodes, they were each released in single packages. Outside of Ubisoft, few other publishers were interested in distributing Telltale's early games, forcing them to turn to their own distribution system.

Once they had secured the rights to Sam & Max, Telltale set about to making this game with an episodic approach, with episodes planned to be released on a tight monthly basis through their partner, GameTap. Sam & Max: Season One was considered a success for the company, and considered one of the first successful demonstration of an episodic release in video games. The success led to additional funding through two rounds of angel investment, including Matthew Le Merle and members of angel group Keiretsu Forum. The studio created a second season for Sam & Max, and found additional niche intellectual property areas, including Wallace & Gromit and Homestar Runner, to continue the episodic adventure game format. When Darrell Rodriguez became CEO of LucasArts in 2008, he wanted to see the old LucasArts adventure properties flourish, leading to a license for Telltale to create a new game in the Monkey Island series, Tales of Monkey Island. Telltale was also able to expand their release platforms beyond personal computers, with releases of these games on various consoles at the time.

To supplement their normal episodic games, Telltale created a pilot program in early 2010 to explore one-off games that would explore other gameplay and storytelling approaches that could eventually be incorporated into their episodic games. The first game, Nelson Tethers: Puzzle Agent, a puzzle-solving game in collaboration with Graham Annable, was released in June 2010, while Poker Night at the Inventory, a crossover poker game featuring characters from Sam and Max, Homestar Runner, Valve's Team Fortress 2, and the webcomic Penny Arcade, was released late in 2010. Telltale followed up Puzzle Agent with a sequel, Puzzle Agent 2, in 2011. In 2013, Telltale continued the series with Poker Night 2. The Walking Dead started out as a pilot program game that was known internally as the "zombie prototype". In general, few of these games brought in large revenues, and until 2010, the founders feared that investors would suddenly pull out of the company and would force its closure.

=== Major franchise acquisitions (2010–2016) ===
Having established themselves as working with comedy franchises, Telltale chose to work with dramatic franchises as well as comedy series. In June 2010, Telltale announced that they had secured licenses with NBC Universal to develop two episodic series based on Back to the Future and Jurassic Park. Notably, Telltale's Jurassic Park: The Game was the first game to break away from the standard adventure game format, including elements like quick time events and time-limited choices which would become a core gameplay element in its future adventure games. Telltale obtained the license from NBC Universal to develop episodic series around the Law & Order franchise in April 2011.

By 2010, Telltale had proven itself successful, with yearly revenues of $10 million, 90% greater than the previous year. Part of this was attributed to Back to the Future: The Game, which Steve Allison, the senior vice-president (VP) of marketing, called in 2011 their "most successful franchise to date". Allison stated that for most of its games, it only needs to sell 100,000 copies to break even, but many of its recent releases have seen twice that number or more. The studio expanded from 90 to 140 employees. They had obtained a license in 2011 to develop a King's Quest adventure game based on the original Sierra games, but Activision took back the rights in 2013, which were subsequently used by The Odd Gentlemen to create its 2015 episodic King's Quest game.

Telltale's breakthrough success came with the licenses of the comic book series The Walking Dead and Fables in association with Warner Bros. Interactive Entertainment in 2011. Allison anticipated that The Walking Dead series could be a $20 to $30 million franchise. Their The Walking Dead video game presented an alteration of Telltale's approach, as rather than a traditional adventure game where players would need to solve puzzles, The Walking Dead was more focused on providing a cinematic experience but presenting choices to the player, either through dialog trees or through quick time events, that would create "determinants" that would feed into latter parts of the episode and into future episodes; one example would be deciding which of one of two characters to save from a zombie attack at the spur of the moment. While these decisions do not have a direct impact on the game's overall narrative and structure, it provides a more personalized story around what decisions the player had made. This format proved highly successful: the game sold one million copies in 20 days, exceeded 8.5 million episode purchases by 2013, and an estimated $40 million in revenue. The success led to two additional 5-episode seasons, a 3-episode mini-season and a final 4-episode season. The Walking Dead is considered to have revitalized the waning adventure game genre due to this more emotionally driven focus. Since The Walking Dead, nearly all of Telltale's games have used a similar approach of being built around the impacts of the player's choices as determinants in later episodes and seasons.

Telltale has had several other licensing details from popular works, including Tales from the Borderlands based on the Borderlands series by Gearbox Software, and Game of Thrones, based on the HBO television show adaption, Minecraft: Story Mode based on the Mojang game, Minecraft, Batman from DC Comics, and Guardians of the Galaxy: The Telltale Series from Marvel Comics. On retrospective after the studio's closure, former employees of Telltale believed that the studio's expansion into all these additional licensed properties were trying to replicate the success of The Walking Dead, moving the company from a risk-taker to seeking risk aversion strategies. This was also propagated by the weight of the licensed properties: they had taken more conservative approaches to deliver a game that mirrored The Walking Dead, a well-known product, rather than take risks and potentially lose the license.

Telltale relocated to a larger space and expanded from 125 to 160 in mid-2013. Around 2015, the company had grown to 200 to 250 employees. The company continued to grow, at its peak having about 400 employees in mid-2017. In the midst of this growth, in 2014–2015, the management of Telltale recognized the need to restructure to handle more projects and more staff. This led to original chief executive officer (CEO) Dan Connors resigning and being replaced by co-founder Kevin Bruner, who was also the firm's president. Connors noted that with the studio's continued growth, it had begun experiencing growth-specific challenges. Connors stated that Bruner's ascension to CEO would best enable Telltale Games to act on future expansion opportunities. Connors remained on the board of directors, and also served as a creative consultant. Internally, there were concerns about this transition and Brunner's influence on it; an anonymous quality control (QC) employee writing in Gamasutra after the firm's closure called this transition "the beginning of the end" for Telltale.

With Bruner's placement as CEO in January 2015, Telltale said it was developing a game based on its own intellectual property as a result of this leadership change. In February 2015, Lionsgate announced an investment within Telltale Games to produce a number of "Super Shows", a hybrid interactive work combining television and video game elements, which would be distributed through non-traditional channels such as through streaming services. The first Super Show planned was an original intellectual property (IP) developed by Telltale that would be able to take advantage of this format. Telltale also announced that Lionsgate CEO Jon Feltheimer and Unity Technologies CEO John Riccitiello joined Telltale's board of directors. Alongside this, Lionsgate had invested US$40 million into Telltale. The "Super Show" concept never got out of pre-production, due to issues that arose with the studio in 2016 and 2017, according to Variety.

=== Restructuring (2017–2018) ===
External videos
- NoClip documentary "Telltale: The Human Stories Behind the Games"

By 2016, Bruner said that the Telltale studio had established an environment to be able to work on four major titles simultaneously with room for various side projects. However, this approach to development had created a perpetual state of "crunch time" within Telltale, according to several current and former staff speaking to USgamer, The Verge, and Variety in 2017. This limited the amount of time that the creators and developers could spend on content in order to maintain a consistent flow of episodes to consumers but impacted the quality of games. There was a perpetual drive to release new episodes on a regular basis, whether they were good or not, so that the company had a continued source of income. This particularly affected the Telltale Tool, the game engine used since the company's inception, which caused numerous bugs in released episodes. The anonymous QC tester stated that their department was nearly always under crunch time, working from 48 to 60 hours a week on testing at least two-game series across multiple platforms simultaneously, and were understaffed, leading to some of the quality control issues as well. During this time, the eighth generation of video game consoles emerged, and while the Telltale Tool was ported to these platforms, it showed its age in graphics quality, which also diminished Telltale's products. There was also a new trend of major AAA titles focusing more on emotional story-telling, such as God of War, which Telltale would not easily be able to compete with.

The company was also hobbled by working with established IP, and inconsistencies in the reviewing process with management that led to last-minute reworking of some episodes. The Verge also found some of the employees they spoke to had stated that top-level executives, including Bruner, had become fixated on the format that The Walking Dead presented, making decisions that prevented developers from looking at alternative formats or variations from this formula, stifling creativity and leading to several staff departures prior to the 2017 layoffs. According to narrative designer Emily Grace Buck, management would frequently demand rewrites of materials, with most games having between 60 and 90 percent of the content reworked after executive review. Bruner and management created a "culture of fear" of demotion or firing among developers. Some of these rewrites had come days prior to an episode's submission date for certification, creating hasty rewrites that filtered through the entire production process. This rush created some of the apparent "bugs" in the Telltale Tool which Buck stated were more often a result of the inability to smooth out hastily reworked animations as well as perpetuating the crunch time culture within the company. Other cases of narrative rewrites were a result of different expectations by some of the executive management. Buck stated that they had originally been driven by management to make Minecraft: Story Mode as a more mature game, but eventually reworked this to a family-friendly title, while for their Guardians of the Galaxy game, the storywriters had written a story they felt more true to the humor and wit of the source material, but were told by management to make a darker story. Further, anonymous sources from Telltale stated that very few of the games were profitable, with only The Walking Dead: The First Season, Minecraft: Story Mode, and revenues from publishing 7 Days to Die turning a profit. Batman: The Telltale Series, released in 2016 was said to be one of the worst commercial failures for the company.

On March 15, 2017, Bruner announced he had stepped down as CEO of Telltale, though Variety reported that he had been voted out of this position by the board of directors. Bruner turned the day-to-day operations to Connors, while still remaining on the board of directors. Bruner said "The time has come to pass the reins to someone that can better drive Telltale to the next level and realize all the potential that is here." Pete Hawley, the former VP for Games at Zynga, was announced as the new CEO, with Connors remaining on its Board and acting in an advisory role. Rather than other corporate "fixers" who take control of a company for a temporary period to help it regain its financial footing, Hawley had committed to staying with Telltale after helping the company to get past these problems.

In November 2017, a restructuring of the company cut about 90 positions, about a quarter of their staff, which was not expected to affect the release of any existing projects. Hawley said that the restructuring was for "reorienting our organization with a focus on delivering fewer, better games with a smaller team". While Telltale had not stated which positions were let go in the restructuring, sources speaking to USgamer stated that most were part of the management structure that led to these problems; coupled with Hawley's appointment as CEO, this was expected to be a turning point to help revitalize Telltale.

In June 2018, Bruner filed a lawsuit against Telltale in relation to his departure, citing financial damages as he had been seemingly removed from the Board of Directors, and thus could not gain information related to Telltale's financial status in anticipation of selling off a portion of his shares in the company. Telltale stated the claims were "meritless". In its response to Bruner's lawsuit, Telltale stated that the company "is now working to turn around the decline that it experienced under [Bruner]'s stewardship". Kent Mudle, the creative director for The Walking Dead: The Final Season, stated that the new management had shown a great deal of effort to turn the studio around from the previous uses, with the executives staying more hands-off and reducing the amount of micromanagement of the creative teams.

In June 2018, Telltale announced a partnership with Netflix for the streaming service to provide its games to subscribers, with the first planned game being Minecraft: Story Mode. Alongside this, Telltale announced that it was working on a yet-untitled game based on Netflix's original property, Stranger Things. According to Variety, there had been suggestions of teaming with Netflix for collaboration shortly after Stranger Things first aired in mid-2016, but Telltale's management at the time, including Bruner, rejected the idea. The Netflix partnership solidified after Hawley took over as CEO. The Stranger Things game would have been used to bridge the show's story between its second and third season. In addition to this game, Telltale had started working with Night School Studio in 2017 for them to make a first-person, narrative driven game that would have led into Telltale's game. However, Night School reported difficulty in cooperating with Telltale over 2018 and were also surprised by the studio's sudden closure.

=== Majority studio closure and aftermath (2018) ===
On September 21, 2018, CEO Pete Hawley announced that Telltale was undergoing a "majority studio closure", with around 90% of its present workforce (225 to 250 employees) let go that day. A core team of about 25 employees remained to "fulfill the company's obligations to its board and partners", which includes completing the Minecraft: Story Mode interactive media project for Netflix. According to Dan Connors, the studio had been ready to close another round of financing when its last major investor pulled out. The company executives had to make the decision to end all production as soon as possible without this investment. While Connors did not specify which investor pulled out, Variety suggested that this may have been Lionsgate, which had contacted Telltale's board the previous week about its intent to pull out of funding Telltale in order to return to its core film business. Variety also reported that AMC Networks, which owns the rights to The Walking Dead television series, and Smilegate, a Korean mobile games publisher, were looking to invest in Telltale, but both pulled out the day before Telltale's closure announcement. Dan Murray, president of Skybound Interactive which was working with Telltale for The Walking Dead games, said "We knew some of the challenges Telltale was facing, but when the news hits so suddenly everyone was taken off guard", while anonymous Telltale employees stated to The Verge that they had known the company was in financial trouble in the months leading up to the closure and was further hurt by leaks of news related to the Netflix deal, which management wanted to use as a lure for speculative investors.

In a press release, Hawley stated:

It's been an incredibly difficult year for Telltale as we worked to set the company on a new course. Unfortunately, we ran out of time trying to get there. We released some of our best content this year and received a tremendous amount of positive feedback, but ultimately, that did not translate to sales. With a heavy heart, we watch our friends leave today to spread our brand of storytelling across the games industry.

— Pete Hawley, CEO of Telltale

Those who were let go reported they were given no warning, had to leave the office building within 30 minutes of the company's decision, received no severance, and only had a limited amount of time on their health care benefits. Melissa Hutchison, the voice actor for Clementine in The Walking Dead games, said that the news came in the middle of a recording session which they had to immediately end. On September 24, the former staff were allowed to return to the office within a three-hour timeframe to gather any belongings they did not manage to collect in the 30 minutes following the majority closure decision. The suddenness of the closure, along with the lack of post-layoff support for the employees, led to renewed discussions about the need for video game developers to unionize, with the Game Workers Unite grassroots movement calling the treatment of the Telltale employees "exploitative". On September 24, 2018, a class-action lawsuit was filed by former Telltale employee Vernie Roberts, representing about a total of 275 Telltale employees, alleging that Telltale violated the federal Worker Adjustment and Retraining Notification Act of 1988 (WARN Act) and the more stringent requirements set by California of requiring at least 60 days notification before issuing mass layoffs.

Telltale did not officially comment on the status of its in-progress games, including The Wolf Among Us: Season Two, Game of Thrones: Season Two, and the untitled Stranger Things project, but laid-off employees alleged that teams working on these games had all been let go. On September 24, Netflix announced that it is "in the process of evaluating other options for bringing the Stranger Things universe to life in an interactive medium." It also confirmed that it plans to go ahead with releasing Minecraft: Story Mode as planned. The first three episodes of Minecraft: Story Mode were subsequently released on Netflix on November 27, and the remaining two were released that December.

Telltale released the second of four planned episodes of The Walking Dead: The Final Season as scheduled on September 25, 2018, and stated that it had been contacted by "multiple potential partners" to help bring the last two episodes of the series to completion in some manner. While some fans of the series were happy about the news, others, including Cory Barlog, suggested that Telltale should prioritize finding ways to pay the let-go developers over finishing the game. Two anonymous sources speaking to Ethan Gach of Kotaku clarified that Telltale was trying to convince potential development partners to hire the staff Telltale had laid off, so that the staff could remotely finish the two remaining episodes of The Walking Dead: The Final Season. During the 2018 New York Comic Con, Robert Kirkman, the creator of The Walking Dead comic, stated that his production company Skybound Entertainment had completed negotiations with Telltale to finish the last two episodes of The Final Season through its Skybound Games division and with the original development team from Telltale.

On October 4, 2018, narrative designer Rachel Noel stated that her team within the skeleton crew was also laid off, and that there were "not many" people left at the company. Telltale saw assignment proceedings begin on October 11, 2018, working through Sherwood Partners to liquidate all remaining assets; the company remains in assignment as of April 2019. Various digital storefronts started removing Telltale products from their marketplaces by that November. For some of these removed games, after rights were returned, the original company was able to rerelease the titles through a new publisher; for example, Skybound republished all four seasons of The Walking Dead as one collection, The Walking Dead: The Telltale Definitive Series, in September 2019, while Gearbox Software rereleased Tales from the Borderlands in February 2021.

=== Relaunch under LCG Entertainment (2018–present) ===
Following negotiations with Sherwood Partners starting in February 2019, LCG Entertainment acquired several key Telltale assets and on August 28, 2019, announced that it was re-launching the company by assuming "Telltale Games" as its trade name, operating out of Malibu, California, with a satellite studio in Corte Madera, California. Under the leadership of founders Jamie Ottilie (chief executive officer) and Brian Waddle (chief revenue officer), the new Telltale is set to re-release the old Telltale's back-catalog, as well as work on new games based on Telltale-affiliated properties. While licenses for games and planned games like The Walking Dead and Stranger Things have since reverted to their original owners, the new Telltale retains licenses for The Wolf Among Us and Batman, as well as the intellectual property for Puzzle Agent. The new Telltale was expected to start small for the first six months to regain distribution channels, and the company has offered former staff of the old Telltale freelance roles within the company with the potential for full-time positions at a later point in time. Partners in the new Telltale include publisher Athlon Games, which will handle distribution, and financial contributors Chris Kingsley, Lyle Hall and Tobias Sjögren. None of the newly involved parties had previously worked with the old Telltale. The first game under this new company was a re-release of Batman: The Telltale Series, adding in a new noir-style shader among other fixes, which was released in December 2019. The company also announced The Wolf Among Us 2 at The Game Awards 2019. The sequel is being made in partnership with AdHoc Studio, a company composed of former Telltale employees who worked on the first game.

Former employees of the original Telltale were skeptical of LCG's approach to the relaunch of Telltale, considering that offering only freelance work while in San Francisco, which has one of the highest costs-of-living in the country, is risky. Others have urged LCG to pay off its existing Telltale debt to its former employees, while others have called for a boycott of any game from the new Telltale. As of 2022, roughly 50 percent of the company's staff is made up of former Telltale employees.

== Development model ==
Telltale Games released video games in episodic installments. It is seen by production studios and other content producers to take a more realistic approach to movie tie-in games rather than the difficult "see the movie, play the game" model, and also collaborates with studios and screenwriters to create a strong experience that pays homage to the original film or franchise. In a September 2017 interview, Job Stauffer called Telltale's role as "an interactive TV network and a studio", able to produce content across a wide range of genres on a regular basis. He considered their studio to be something between a video game developer and a cable or streaming network with production capabilities like HBO or Netflix.

In general, Telltale offered its games as a one-time "season pass" purchase for the game's season when the first episode of the season was released, with the user then entitled to all planned episodes for that season. For digital purchases, this entitlement was handled through the digital storefront. In retail, Telltale published complete seasons after the season's digital release was over, but also adopted a model where they could publish, at the same time as the digital release, a retail disc that contains the first episode. The disc included a "season pass" entitlement to the remaining episodes to be digitally downloaded, tied to the disc itself rather than the user. This allowed for trading or resale of the retail product that can be played by others, which according to Stauffer, makes for a "nice in-between" market model that satisfies players, retailers, and themselves. For some of its games, Telltale developed additional downloadable content, such as 400 Days for The Walking Dead, or three additional episodes for Minecraft: Story Mode Season 1, which must be purchased separately from the season pass.

With Batman: The Telltale Series and most of the episodic adventure games released later, Telltale added a "Crowd Play" feature that can be used by those that stream their playthroughs on services like Twitch. Through Crowd Play, viewers can vote for an option for the streamer to select. While mainly a developer, Telltale also verified its self-publishing ethos; the only classic developer-publisher relationship was with Ubisoft for the CSI video game franchise. They have struck financial arrangements with GameTap for the first two seasons of the rebooted Sam & Max games, but its publishing arrangements have been chiefly made after the games were already completed and had already been sold via digital distribution.

Telltale aimed to present itself on as many digital platforms and avenues as possible. It has released games through GameTap; on Microsoft Windows and OS X, through Steam and similar services, plus its own online store, on Wii via WiiWare and disc, on Xbox 360, via Xbox Live Arcade and disc, on PlayStation 3 through PlayStation Network and disc, on iPhone and iPad through iTunes, on PlayStation Vita, and on Kindle Fire HDX. Though Telltale normally ports its own games to other systems, CSI: 3 Dimensions of Murder was ported to the PlayStation 2 by Ubisoft Sofia, and Bone: Out from Boneville was ported to Mac OS by Vanbrio. Telltale was one of the companies who Sony confirmed pledged PlayStation 4 third-party support at the PlayStation Meeting 2013. Telltale had also committed to developing and re-releasing seasons for the Nintendo Switch. Stauffer stated that there were no restrictions on what games they can bring to the Switch due to content, but it was focusing on its more recent, family-friendly games like Minecraft: Story Mode, Batman, and Guardians of the Galaxy only due to ease of porting these to the Switch, while older games like The Walking Dead required more effort to port.

=== Telltale Tool ===
The Telltale Tool is a proprietary game engine developed by Telltale. Telltale commenced development on the engine shortly after its founding, initially referring to the engine as the "Telltale Engine and Toolset". A casual poker game, Telltale Texas Hold'em, was created to test its engine and distribution model, and to ensure that all major bugs were ironed out before the release of its first adventure game, Bone: Out from Boneville. The Telltale Tool has been used for every game developed by Telltale Games, and continued to receive improvements since the initial version, such as compatibility to new systems and better graphics capabilities. The only third-party game to use the Telltale Tool, Hector: Badge of Carnage, was developed by Straandlooper and also published by Telltale Games.

While the Telltale Tool has been updated over the years to support newer consoles and computers, it lacked features that made it more difficult to develop for as the company took on more projects, rushing the development schedules. Until 2016, Telltale Tool did not have a physics engine, meaning that if a scene required an object to fall, this had to be animated by hand, taking time from other more productive activities. This also prevented them from using elements like dynamic lighting, and required them to develop lighting models using 3D modeling tools like Maya, significantly extending time to develop art assets. The aged feature set of the Telltale Tool led to a perception that many of Telltale's games had an abnormally high rate of bugs and other technical flaws, pervasive enough to pose a significant risk of impeding players' ability to progress through a given game. A 2015 article by Kotaku noted that "their games, wonderful in many ways as they may be, have been accompanied by an undercurrent of fan anger" over widespread bugs and glitches. The article concluded that Telltale's support forums "paint a portrait of a publisher that is constantly releasing buggy and even outright broken games", seemingly lacking the resources to fix or even monitor most of them.

Telltale moved to an improved version of its engine around early 2016, partially implemented first in The Walking Dead: Michonne and completed for the release of Batman: The Telltale Series. The updated Telltale Tool provided direct support for DirectX 11 features, including physics-based models, texture mapping and blending, and dynamic lighting and shadows. The changes also helped automate and integrate a game's development across all departments within Telltale, and specifically helped to reduce memory use in some scenes, which had been identified as causing bugs in some consoles' versions. In mid-June 2018, Variety reported that Telltale was moving away from the Telltale Tool and instead toward the established Unity game engine. The Stranger Things game was expected to be the first to use the Unity-based engine.

=== Telltale Publishing ===
Telltale helped other developers to publish their games. Under the moniker Telltale Publishing, Telltale entered into a publishing deal with Jackbox Games to bring the console versions of The Jackbox Party Pack to retail markets, and with The Fun Pimps to publish 7 Days to Die for consoles; according to Variety, this publishing deal was as financially successful for Telltale as the first The Walking Dead season. On August 18, 2016, Telltale published Mr. Robot:1.51exfiltrati0n by Night School Studio. During the company's restructuring in 2017, the publishing branch of Telltale had been put on hiatus but was expected to be reused once the company regained its financial stability.

== Games ==
=== Developed ===
Title	Release	# of episodes	Platform(s)
Telltale Texas Hold'em	February 11, 2005	Standalone game	Microsoft Windows
Bone: Out from Boneville	September 15, 2005	Standalone game	macOS, Microsoft Windows
CSI: 3 Dimensions of Murder	March 21, 2006	5 episodes	PlayStation 2, Microsoft Windows
Bone: The Great Cow Race	April 12, 2006	Standalone game	Microsoft Windows
Sam & Max Save the World	October 17, 2006—April 26, 2007	6 episodes	Wii, Microsoft Windows, Xbox 360
CSI: Hard Evidence	September 25, 2007	5 episodes	macOS, Wii, Microsoft Windows, Xbox 360
Sam & Max Beyond Time and Space	November 8, 2007—April 10, 2008	5 episodes	iOS, macOS, PlayStation 3, Wii, Microsoft Windows, Xbox 360
Strong Bad's Cool Game for Attractive People	August 11, 2008—December 15, 2008	5 episodes	macOS, PlayStation 3, Wii, Microsoft Windows
Wallace & Gromit's Grand Adventures	March 24, 2009—July 30, 2009	4 episodes	iOS, Microsoft Windows, Xbox 360
Tales of Monkey Island	July 7, 2009—December 8, 2009	5 episodes	iOS, macOS, PlayStation 3, Wii, Microsoft Windows
CSI: Deadly Intent	October 20, 2009	5 episodes	Wii, Microsoft Windows, Xbox 360
Sam & Max: The Devil's Playhouse	April 15, 2010—August 30, 2010	5 episodes	iOS, macOS, PlayStation 3, Microsoft Windows
Puzzle Agent	June 30, 2010	Standalone game	iOS, macOS, PlayStation 3, Microsoft Windows
CSI: Fatal Conspiracy	October 26, 2010	5 episodes	PlayStation 3, Wii, Microsoft Windows, Xbox 360
Poker Night at the Inventory	November 22, 2010	Standalone game	macOS, Microsoft Windows
Back to the Future: The Game	December 22, 2010—June 23, 2011	5 episodes	iOS, macOS, PlayStation 3, PlayStation 4, Wii, Microsoft Windows, Xbox 360, Xbox One
Puzzle Agent 2	June 30, 2011	Standalone game	iOS, macOS, Microsoft Windows
Jurassic Park: The Game	November 15, 2011	4 episodes	iOS, macOS, PlayStation 3, Microsoft Windows, Xbox 360
Law & Order: Legacies	December 22, 2011—March 29, 2012	7 episodes	iOS, macOS, Microsoft Windows
The Walking Dead	April 24, 2012—November 20, 2012; July 2, 2013 (400 Days)	5 episodes Standalone episode (400 Days)	Android, iOS, macOS, Nintendo Switch, PlayStation 3, PlayStation 4, PlayStation Vita, Microsoft Windows, Xbox 360, Xbox One
Poker Night 2	April 24, 2013	Standalone game	iOS, macOS, PlayStation 3, Microsoft Windows, Xbox 360
The Wolf Among Us	October 11, 2013—July 8, 2014; October 29, 2026 (The Wolf Among Us Remastered)	5 episodes	Android, iOS, macOS, PlayStation 3, PlayStation 4, PlayStation Vita, Microsoft Windows, Xbox 360, Xbox One
The Walking Dead: Season Two	December 17, 2013—August 26, 2014	5 episodes	Android, iOS, macOS, Nintendo Switch, PlayStation 3, PlayStation 4, PlayStation Vita, Microsoft Windows, Xbox 360, Xbox One
Tales from the Borderlands	November 25, 2014—October 20, 2015	5 episodes	Android, iOS, macOS, Nintendo Switch, PlayStation 3, PlayStation 4, Microsoft Windows, Xbox 360, Xbox One
Game of Thrones	December 2, 2014—November 17, 2015	6 episodes	Android, iOS, macOS, PlayStation 3, PlayStation 4, Microsoft Windows, Xbox 360, Xbox One
Minecraft: Story Mode	October 13, 2015—March 29, 2016; June 7, 2016—September 13, 2016 (Adventure Pass)	5 episodes 3 episodes (Adventure Pass)	Android, iOS, macOS, Nintendo Switch, PlayStation 3, PlayStation 4, Wii U, Microsoft Windows, Xbox 360, Xbox One, Netflix
The Walking Dead: Michonne	February 23, 2016—April 26, 2016	3 episodes	Android, iOS, macOS, PlayStation 3, PlayStation 4, Microsoft Windows, Xbox 360, Xbox One
Batman: The Telltale Series	August 2, 2016—December 13, 2016	5 episodes	Android, iOS, Nintendo Switch, PlayStation 3, PlayStation 4, Microsoft Windows, Xbox 360, Xbox One
The Walking Dead: A New Frontier	December 20, 2016—May 30, 2017	5 episodes	Android, iOS, Nintendo Switch, PlayStation 4, Microsoft Windows, Xbox One
Guardians of the Galaxy: The Telltale Series	April 18, 2017—November 7, 2017	5 episodes	Android, iOS, macOS, PlayStation 4, Microsoft Windows, Xbox One
Minecraft: Story Mode – Season Two	July 11, 2017—December 19, 2017	5 episodes	Android, iOS, macOS, Nintendo Switch, PlayStation 4, Microsoft Windows, Xbox 360, Xbox One
Batman: The Enemy Within	August 8, 2017—March 27, 2018	5 episodes	Android, iOS, Nintendo Switch, PlayStation 4, Microsoft Windows, Xbox One
The Walking Dead Collection	December 5, 2017	19 episodes (Note: Includes all episodes from The Walking Dead: Season One, 400 Days, Season Two, Michonne, and A New Frontier)	PlayStation 4, Xbox One, Microsoft Windows
The Walking Dead: The Final Season	August 14, 2018—September 25, 2018; January 15, 2019—March 26, 2019 (Skybound Games) (Note: The first two episodes were developed only by Telltale, while Skybound Games overtook the finalization of the other two episodes from Telltale in October 2018.)	4 episodes	Nintendo Switch, PlayStation 4, Microsoft Windows, Xbox One
The Wolf Among Us 2	2027 (Originally cancelled, restarted under LCG Entertainment)	5 episodes	Nintendo Switch, Nintendo Switch 2, PlayStation 5, Microsoft Windows, Xbox One, Xbox Series X/S
Untitled Game of Thrones sequel	Cancelled	—N/a	—N/a
Untitled Stranger Things game	Cancelled	—N/a	—N/a
Untitled project	Cancelled	—N/a	iOS, Android

=== Published ===
Title	Developer(s)	Release	# of episodes	Platform(s)
Hector: Badge of Carnage	Straandlooper	June 2, 2010—September 22, 2011	3 episodes	iOS, macOS, Microsoft Windows
The Jackbox Party Pack	Jackbox Games	November 3, 2015	Standalone game	PlayStation 3, PlayStation 4, Xbox 360, Xbox One, Microsoft Windows
7 Days to Die	The Fun Pimps	June 28, 2016	Standalone game	PlayStation 4, Xbox One, MacOS, Microsoft Windows
Mr. Robot	Night School Studio	August 16, 2016	Standalone game	Android, iOS
RGX: Showdown	Shortround Games	September 18, 2018	Standalone game	PlayStation 4, Xbox One
Stranded Deep	Beam Team Games	Originally cancelled, self-published by Beam Team on April 21, 2020 (Note: Telltale announced that it was publishing consoles ports of Stranded Deep on September 20, 2018, one day prior to its majority studio closure. The intended release date was October 9, 2018.)	Standalone game	PlayStation 4, Xbox One

== Legacy ==
The release of the first season of The Walking Dead in 2012 is considered to have created a resurgence in the adventure game genre, which had been languishing since about 2000. Dontnod Entertainment, which was approached by Square Enix to use the episodic approach, found it ideal for Life Is Strange's storytelling. Telltale's approach to branching stories has often been criticized, with choices ultimately having little effect on a game's overall narration, often being summarized as "choices don't matter"; players may make choices to save a character from death early in a game, but only to have that character die later for the game to have a cohesive plot and making the player's effort to save the character meaningless, for example.

Former employees of Telltale Games have gone on to adapt the narrative aspects of these games into their own products. Sean Vanaman and Jake Rodkin, co-writers of the first season of The Walking Dead, decided to leave to pursue independent game development, founding Campo Santo in 2013 and releasing Firewatch, a critically praised narrative-driven exploration game. Adam Hines, a writer for Telltale, co-founded Night School Studio in 2014, subsequently releasing Oxenfree which heavily used a "walk and talk" mechanic as part of its gameplay. Four former employees who had left before the studio's closure—Michael Choung (who had briefly spent time at Night School Studio), Dennis Lenart, Nick Herman, and Pierre Shorette—formed AdHoc Studio with the intent to develop live-action interactive video games, following in Telltale's footsteps. AdHoc has since become involved with the new Telltale Games by LCG to help with the narrative and cinematic elements of The Wolf Among Us 2, as well as releasing the original game Dispatch, which was well received. Telltale co-founder Dan Connors created a new studio in 2019, Skunkape Games, made up of himself and former Telltale employees Jake Rodkin, Randy Tudor, and Jonathan Sgro. Beginning in 2020, the studio began releasing remasters of Telltale's Sam & Max games and Poker Night at the Inventory with assistance from other members of the original development team. In 2021, Telltale co-founder Kevin Bruner created a new studio Dramatic Labs with more than twenty former Telltale employees, including former lead writer and creative director Andrew Grant, former lead writer Dan Martin, former creative director Kent Mudle, and former executive producer and creative director Brett Tosti. Dramatic Labs' first game, Star Trek: Resurgence, was released in May 2023.
