= British Academy Games Award for Performer =

Video game industry award

British Academy Video Games Award for Performer
- Awarded for: Best performance in a game
- Presented by: BAFTA
- First award: 2012
- Final award: 2018

Highlights
- Most awards: Ashley Johnson (2)
- Most nominations: Troy Baker; Nolan North (3)
- Website: www.bafta.org/games

The British Academy Video Games Award for Performer is an award presented annually by the British Academy of Film and Television Arts (BAFTA) in honor of the best performance featured in a game "from voice artistry through to motion capture by a performer".

The award was first given at the 8th British Academy Video Games Awards ceremony in 2012, with Mark Hamill winning for his performance as the Joker in Batman: Arkham City. The performer with the most awards is Ashley Johnson with two, one each for her portrayal of Ellie in both The Last of Us and The Last of Us: Left Behind. Troy Baker and Nolan North received the most nominations with three.

Since 2019, the award has been split into "Performer in a Leading Role" and "Performer in a Supporting Role".

== Winners and nominees ==
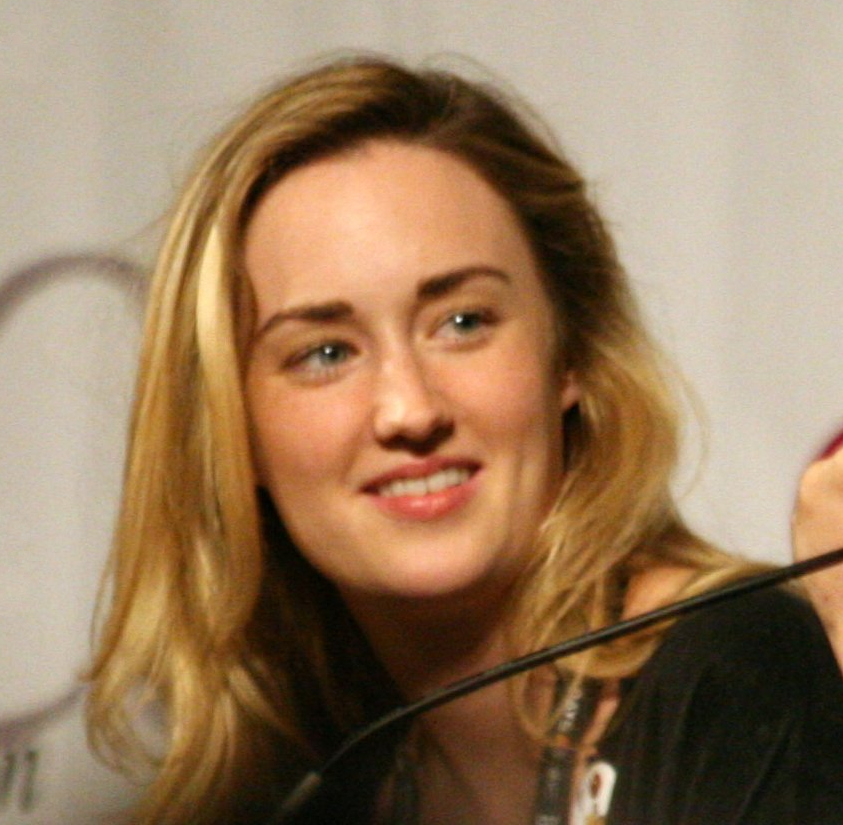
Ashley Johnson won twice, in 2013 and 2014

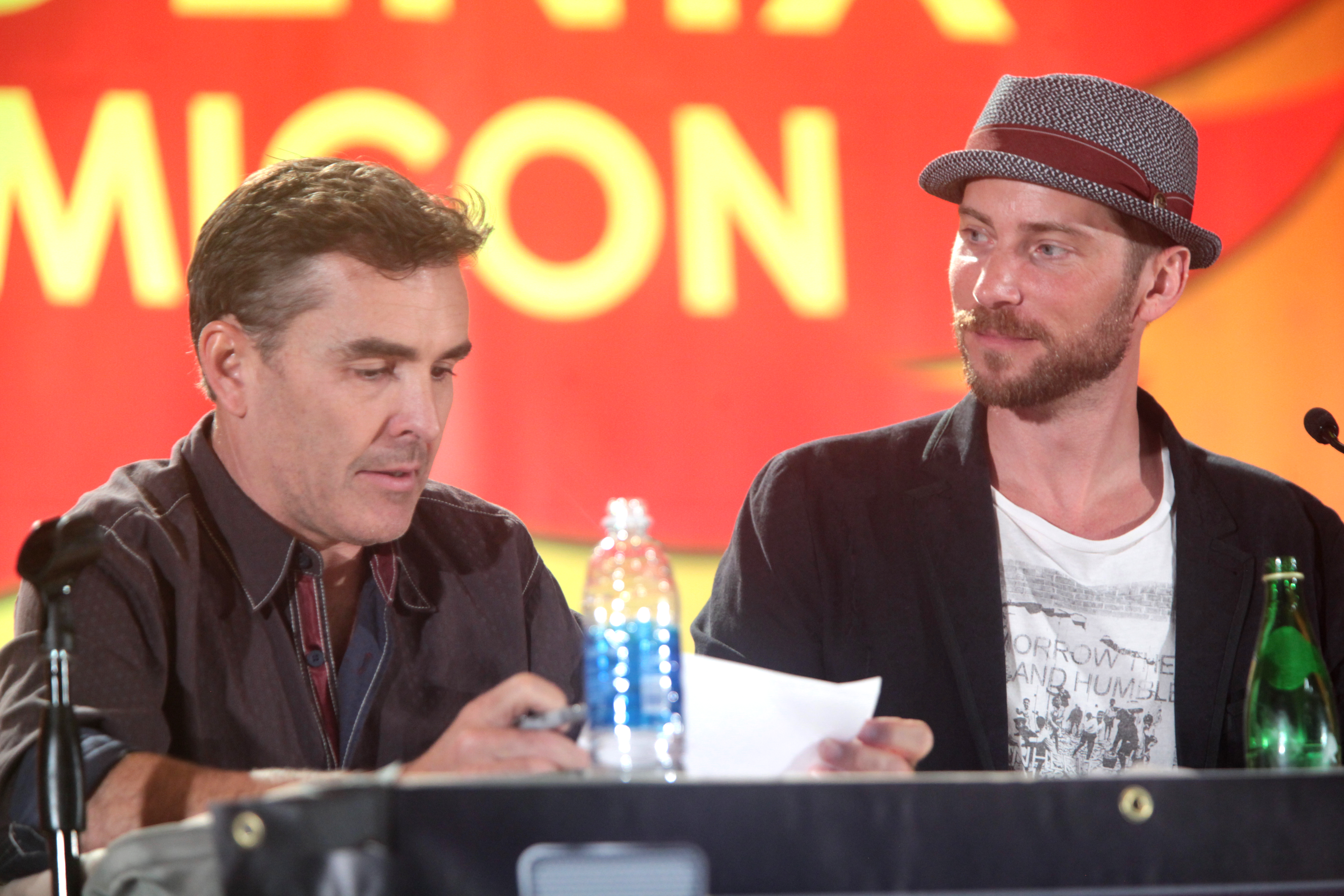
Nolan North (left) and Troy Baker both received three nominations

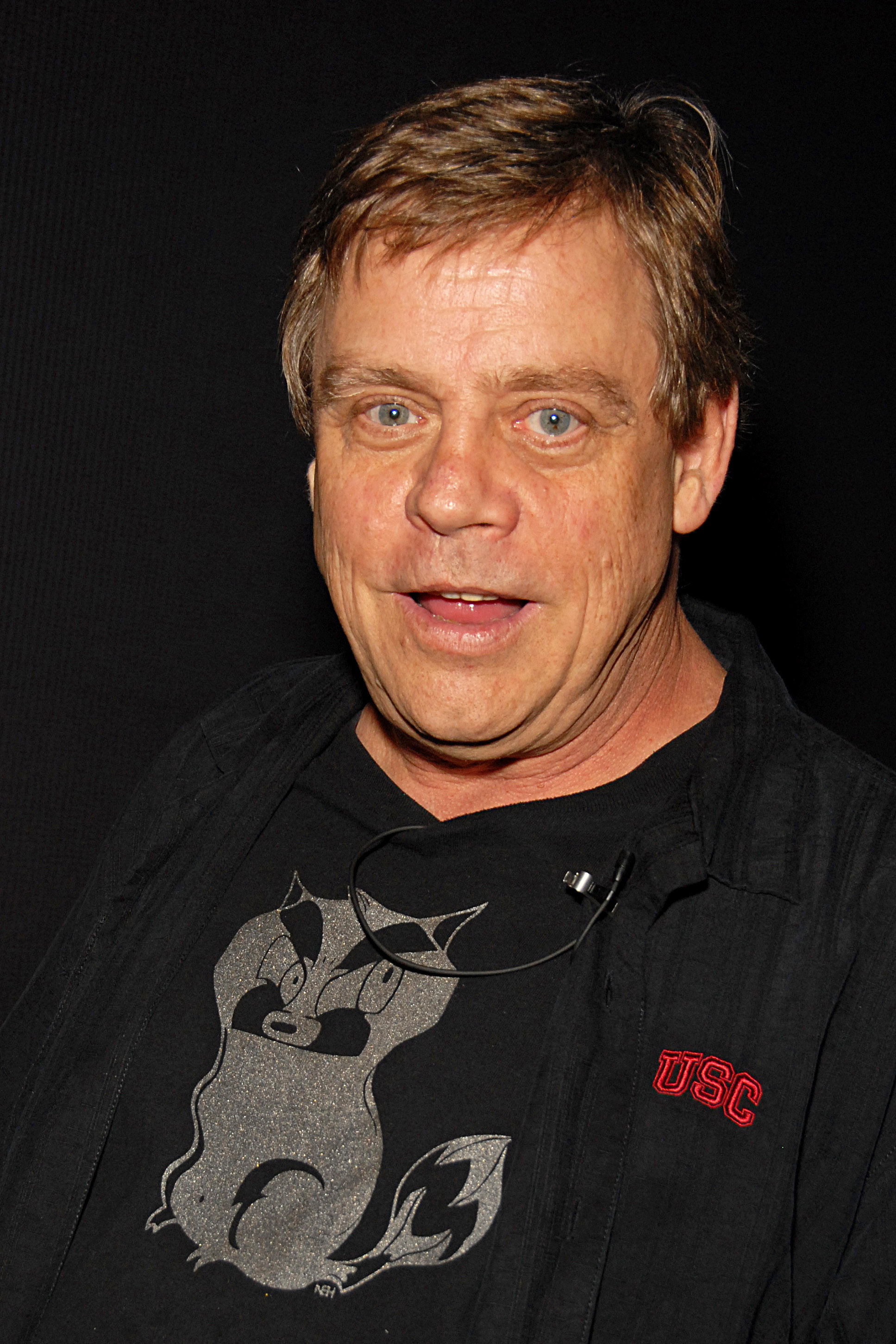
Mark Hamill, 2011 winner

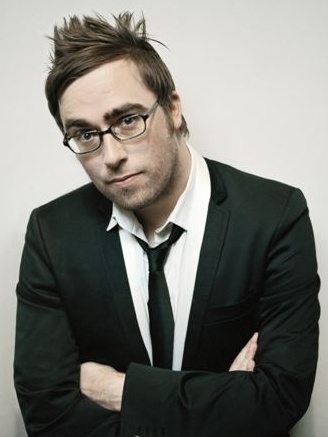
Danny Wallace, 2012 winner

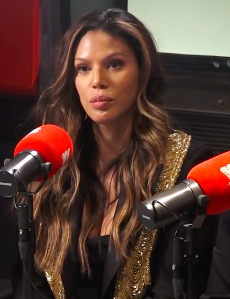
Merle Dandridge, 2015 winner

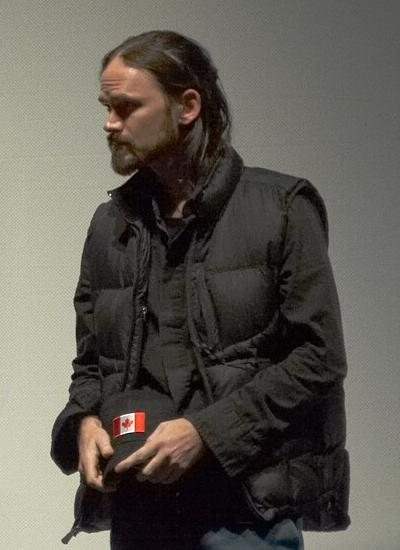
Jeremy Davies, 2018 winner

In the following table, the years are listed as per BAFTA convention, and generally correspond to the year of game release in the United Kingdom.

Table key
| Indicates the winner |

| Year | Performer | Game | Role(s) | Ref. |
|---|---|---|---|---|
| 2011 (8th) | Mark Hamill | Batman: Arkham City | The Joker | |
| 2011 (8th) | Stephen Fry | LittleBigPlanet 2 | Narrator | |
| 2011 (8th) | Togo Igawa | Total War: Shogun 2 | Diplomat, Advisor and Military General | |
| 2011 (8th) | Stephen Merchant | Portal 2 | Wheatley | |
| 2011 (8th) | Nolan North | Uncharted 3: Drake's Deception | Nathan Drake | |
| 2011 (8th) | Aaron Staton | L.A. Noire | Cole Phelps | |
| 2012 (9th) | Danny Wallace | Thomas Was Alone | Narrator | |
| 2012 (9th) | Nigel Carrington | Dear Esther | Narrator | |
| 2012 (9th) | Dave Fennoy | The Walking Dead | Lee Everett | |
| 2012 (9th) | Adrian Hough | Assassin's Creed III | Haytham Kenway | |
| 2012 (9th) | Melissa Hutchison | The Walking Dead | Clementine | |
| 2012 (9th) | Nolan North | Uncharted: Golden Abyss | Nathan Drake | |
| 2013 (10th) | Ashley Johnson | The Last of Us | Ellie | |
| 2013 (10th) | Troy Baker | The Last of Us | Joel Miller | |
| 2013 (10th) | Kevan Brighting | The Stanley Parable | The Narrator | |
| 2013 (10th) | Courtnee Draper | BioShock Infinite | Elizabeth | |
| 2013 (10th) | Steven Ogg | Grand Theft Auto V | Trevor Philips | |
| 2013 (10th) | Elliot Page | Beyond: Two Souls | Jodie Holmes | |
| 2014 (11th) | Ashley Johnson | The Last of Us: Left Behind | Ellie | |
| 2014 (11th) | Troy Baker | Far Cry 4 | Pagan Min | |
| 2014 (11th) | Logan Cunningham | Transistor | Transistor | |
| 2014 (11th) | Adam Harrington | The Wolf Among Us | Bigby Wolf | |
| 2014 (11th) | Melissa Hutchison | The Walking Dead: Season Two | Clementine | |
| 2014 (11th) | Kevin Spacey | Call of Duty: Advanced Warfare | Jonathan Irons | |
| 2015 (12th) | Merle Dandridge | Everybody's Gone to the Rapture | Kate Collins | |
| 2015 (12th) | Ashly Burch | Life Is Strange | Chloe Price | |
| 2015 (12th) | Doug Cockle | The Witcher 3: Wild Hunt | Geralt of Rivia | |
| 2015 (12th) | Oliver Dimsdale | Everybody's Gone to the Rapture | Stephen Appleton | |
| 2015 (12th) | Mark Hamill | Batman: Arkham Knight | Joker | |
| 2015 (12th) | Masasa Moyo | Broken Age: Act 2 | Vella | |
| 2016 (13th) | Cissy Jones | Firewatch | Delilah | |
| 2016 (13th) | Troy Baker | Uncharted 4: A Thief's End | Sam Drake | |
| 2016 (13th) | Alex Hernandez | Mafia III | Lincoln Clay | |
| 2016 (13th) | Navid Negahban | 1979 Revolution: Black Friday | Hajj Agha | |
| 2016 (13th) | Nolan North | Uncharted 4: A Thief's End | Nathan Drake | |
| 2016 (13th) | Emily Rose | Uncharted 4: A Thief's End | Elena Fisher | |
| 2017 (14th) | Melina Juergens | Hellblade: Senua's Sacrifice | Senua | |
| 2017 (14th) | Laura Bailey | Uncharted: The Lost Legacy | Nadine Ross | |
| 2017 (14th) | Claudia Black | Uncharted: The Lost Legacy | Chloe Frazer | |
| 2017 (14th) | Ashly Burch | Horizon Zero Dawn | Aloy | |
| 2017 (14th) | Valerie Rose Lohman | What Remains of Edith Finch | Edith Finch | |
| 2017 (14th) | Abubakar Salim | Assassin's Creed Origins | Bayek | |
| 2018 (15th) | Jeremy Davies | God of War | The Stranger/Baldur | |
| 2018 (15th) | Danielle Bisutti | God of War | Freya | |
| 2018 (15th) | Roger Clark | Red Dead Redemption 2 | Arthur Morgan | |
| 2018 (15th) | Christopher Judge | God of War | Kratos | |
| 2018 (15th) | Melissanthi Mahut | Assassin's Creed Odyssey | Kassandra | |
| 2018 (15th) | Sunny Suljic | God of War | Atreus | |

== Multiple wins and nominations ==
=== Performers ===
The following performers received two or more nominations:

| Performer | Nominations | Wins |
|---|---|---|
| Troy Baker | 3 | 0 |
| Nolan North | 3 | 0 |
| Ashley Johnson | 2 | 2 |
| Mark Hamill | 2 | 1 |
| Ashly Burch | 2 | 0 |
| Melissa Hutchison | 2 | 0 |

=== Series ===
The following series received two or more nominations:

| Series / game | Nominations | Wins |
|---|---|---|
| Uncharted | 7 | 0 |
| God of War (game) | 4 | 1 |
| The Last of Us | 3 | 2 |
| Assassin's Creed | 3 | 0 |
| Uncharted 4: A Thief's End | 3 | 0 |
| The Walking Dead | 3 | 0 |
| Everybody's Gone to the Rapture | 2 | 1 |
| The Last of Us (game) | 2 | 1 |
| Batman: Arkham | 2 | 0 |
| Uncharted: The Lost Legacy | 2 | 0 |
| The Walking Dead (game) | 2 | 0 |
