= The Walking Dead (video game series) =

Episodic graphic adventure video game series

- Genres: Graphic adventure; Interactive movie
- Developers: Telltale Games; Skybound Games (Note: Skybound Games developed the final two episodes of The Final Season.)
- Publishers: Telltale Games; Skybound Games
- Composer: Jared Emerson-Johnson
- Platforms: Windows; macOS; PlayStation 3; PlayStation 4; PlayStation Vita; Xbox 360; Xbox One; Nintendo Switch; Android; iOS
- First release: Season 1 – "A New Day"; April 24, 2012; 14 years ago
- Latest release: The Walking Dead: The Telltale Definitive Series; September 10, 2019; 7 years ago
- Parent series: The Walking Dead (comic book)

The Walking Dead (Note: Also known as Telltale's The Walking Dead, or alternatively subtitled with The Telltale Series or A Telltale Games Series) is an episodic graphic adventure video game series developed and originally published by Telltale Games, based on the comic book series of the same name by Robert Kirkman, Tony Moore, and Charlie Adlard, taking place in the universe of the comics but following a different story and characters. The first "season" of the game series was released in April 2012, and the series currently spans four main seasons of five "episodes" each (excepting the final season with only four episodes), an additional episode as downloadable content (DLC), and a mini three-episode spin-off game, with the fourth and final season having premiered in 2018 and concluded in 2019. Currently published by Skybound Games, the games have been released to personal computers, game consoles, and mobile devices, and have had both digital and physical releases. It is Telltale's flagship franchise, with the combined games having sold 80 million episodes and generated over $300 million in revenue as of 2023.

The series, like the comic, starts with a pandemic that turns the dead into zombie-like "walkers" that decimates civilization, and takes place along the United States eastern seaboard. The series focuses on the character of Clementine, a young girl that is cared for by Lee Everett during the first season, and subsequently travels both by herself and with other groups in later seasons after Lee sacrifices himself for her. During the second season, she becomes the adoptive caretaker of AJ, an infant left parentless. When Clementine later joins with a survival group called the New Frontier in the third season, they strip AJ from her, and Clementine works with another survivor, Javier Garcia, to rescue both their families from the New Frontier. During the final season, some years later, Clementine and AJ join other teenagers holding out at their boarding school to protect it from bandits and walkers. Some of the characters from the comic series, such as Shawn Greene, Glenn Rhee, Hershel Greene, Michonne, Siddiq and Paul "Jesus" Monroe, have appeared during the video game series.

The games in The Walking Dead series eschew typical puzzles and exploration found in most adventure games and instead offer a stronger narrative and interaction with other characters. The game mixes such scenes with more action-oriented ones based on quick time events to elicit excitement during the games. Telltale introduced the feature of having numerous determinants that could result from the player's choices, such as which of two characters to save during an attack, that influenced the story in later episodes and seasons, and the company has used this aspect of player choice in its subsequent adventure games.

While the series was primarily developed and published by Telltale Games under license from Skybound, the studio effectively shuttered in late 2018 in the midst of the fourth main series, The Final Season. Robert Kirkman, creator of The Walking Dead and of Skybound, felt it was necessary to finish off Clementine's story, and hired some of the Telltale staff to finish off the series. Skybound also took over publishing duties for the other games in the series.

The series has been praised for its strong narratives and impact of player choices. The first season was particularly noted as having been considered as revitalizing the waning adventure game genre, which had been languishing since around 2000.

== Concept ==
The Walking Dead series is based on the comic series of the same name. The game's events run concurrently to the comic, starting at the onset of a zombie apocalypse, where dead humans have become undead "walkers" that feed on the living which quickly overwhelmed most of the population. As established in the comic and show, this is a result of a virus that all living humans possess that takes over the brain of the body once the person dies, and the only way to stop this is to destroy the brain.

The game series initially starts in Georgia, with the whole of the first season and the events of 400 Days content taking place within the state. The second series follows the protagonists as they move north along the United States' eastern seaboard, believing there to be a human encampment in the north as well as the colder temperatures slowing the walkers' speed.

== Gameplay ==
The Walking Dead games follow the same point-and-click adventure game approach that other Telltale Games episodic series have followed. Within an episode, the player controls a protagonist as the story progresses through several scenes. Within a scene, the player can move the character to explore the area, examine items, and initiate conversation trees with non-player characters; in these dialogs, the player has the option of selecting a number of options to reply to characters, including the option to stay silent. Other scenes are based on cinematic elements using quick time events in which the player must hit a controller button or a keyboard command as indicated on screen to react to an event. Failure to do so in time can lead to the character's death or other undesirable ending, and the game will restart just prior to these scenes.

All choices made by the player in The Walking Dead are tracked by the game, and certain choices ("determinants") will influence later scenes across the episodes and the series to date, when the player continues from the same saved game state. For example, in the first episode of the first season, the player has an option to save one of two non-player characters from a walker attack; the other character is killed, while the surviving character will uniquely impact other aspects of the story. Other times, selection of certain dialog options will influence the attitude of a non-player character towards the protagonist, and can manifest in later scenes as providing additional options for the player to select from. Telltale Games tracks these decisions, including five main choices made during the course of each episode, allowing players to compare their choices to others.

== Games ==
Year	Title	Platform(s)	Developer(s)
2012–2013	The Walking Dead: Season One	Android, iOS, macOS, Nintendo Switch, PlayStation 3, PlayStation 4, PlayStation Vita, Windows, Xbox 360, Xbox One	Telltale Games
2013–2014	The Walking Dead: Season Two	Android, iOS, macOS, Nintendo Switch, PlayStation 3, PlayStation 4, PlayStation Vita, Windows, Xbox 360, Xbox One	Telltale Games
2016	The Walking Dead: Michonne	Android, iOS, macOS, PlayStation 3, PlayStation 4, Windows, Xbox 360, Xbox One	Telltale Games
2016–2017	The Walking Dead: A New Frontier	Android, iOS, Nintendo Switch, PlayStation 4, Windows, Xbox One	Telltale Games
2017	The Walking Dead Collection (Note: Includes all 19 theretofore released episodes of the series, from the first three seasons in addition to 400 Days and Michonne, but excludes the fourth season (The Final Season) which hadn't been released yet. Collection released on December 5, 2017.)	PlayStation 4, Windows, Xbox One	Telltale Games
2018–2019	The Walking Dead: The Final Season	Nintendo Switch, PlayStation 4, Windows, Xbox One	Telltale Games (episodes 1–2) Skybound Games (episodes 3–4)
2019	The Walking Dead: The Telltale Definitive Series (Note: Includes all 23 episodes of the series, from all four seasons in addition to 400 Days and Michonne. Collection released on September 10, 2019.)	PlayStation 4, Windows, Xbox One	Skybound Games

== Series overview ==
Season	Episodes	Originally released	
Season	Episodes	First released	Last released
1	6	April 24, 2012	July 2, 2013
2	5	December 17, 2013	August 26, 2014
Michonne	3	February 23, 2016	April 26, 2016
3	5	December 20, 2016	May 30, 2017
4	4	August 14, 2018	March 26, 2019

=== Season 1 (2012–13) ===
No. overall	No. in season	Title	Directed by	Written by	Original release date
Main series
1	1	"A New Day"	Sean Vanaman; Jake Rodkin	Sean Vanaman	April 24, 2012
2	2	"Starved for Help"	Dennis Lenart	Mark Darin; Story by: Chuck Jordan	June 27, 2012
3	3	"Long Road Ahead"	Eric Parsons	Sean Vanaman; Story by: Sean Vanaman; Jake Rodkin; Harrison G. Pink	August 28, 2012
4	4	"Around Every Corner"	Nick Herman	Gary Whitta	October 9, 2012
5	5	"No Time Left"	Sean Vanaman; Jake Rodkin; Sean Ainsworth	Sean Vanaman	November 20, 2012
Downloadable content
6	6	"400 Days"	Sean Ainsworth	Sean Ainsworth; Nick Breckon; Mark Darin; Sean Vanaman; Gary Whitta	July 2, 2013

At the onset of the zombie apocalypse, Lee Everett rescues young Clementine whose parents had traveled to Savannah prior to the apocalypse. They join with other survivors in Macon, Georgia to protect themselves from the undead, taking shelter in a defensible motel. When their position is overrun by both walkers and scavengers, the group flees and heads towards Savannah hoping to find boats to flee the mainland. Lee promises to reunite Clementine with her parents while teaching her rules of survival in this new world. In Savannah, they find no boats, and a strange man communicating to Clementine via walkie-talkie. When Clementine goes missing, Lee in his panic searching is accidentally bitten by a walker. With his time short, Lee assures the safety of the remaining survivors and goes to rescue Clementine, held by a man who has blamed Lee directly for the death of his family. Lee and Clementine overwhelm the man, and as they escape, they witness Clementine's parents, who have already become walkers. Clementine drags a weakening Lee to a safe location, and Lee, in his final moments of rationality, directs her to find the other survivors, before telling her to kill him or leave him before he fully becomes a walker.

=== 400 Days (2013) ===
400 Days is a downloadable special episode. It focuses on five different protagonists and it serves as a bridge between Season 1 and Season 2. In the final scene, the survivors of each story are offered to be taken into a safe camp.

==== Digital pinball theme ====
A 3-D virtual pinball theme based on the first season, developed jointly by Telltale Games and Zen Studios, was released on August 27, 2014, as downloadable content for most of Zen Studios' family of pinball games and also as a standalone paid mobile app.

=== Season 2 (2013–14) ===
No. overall	No. in season	Title	Directed by	Written by	Original release date
7	1	"All That Remains"	Dennis Lenart	Nick Breckon; Andrew Grant	December 17, 2013
8	2	"A House Divided"	Eric Parsons	Nick Breckon	March 4, 2014
9	3	"In Harm's Way"	Graham Ross	Pierre Shorette	May 13, 2014
10	4	"Amid the Ruins"	Jason Latino	J. T. Petty; Eric Stirpe	July 22, 2014
11	5	"No Going Back"	Sean Ainsworth; Dennis Lenart	Nick Breckon; Pierre Shorette	August 26, 2014

More than a year after the first game, Clementine is separated from the other survivors and forced to fend on her own. She meets up with another group that are attempting to flee a man named Carver, who runs the human survivor camp at a strip mall, as alluded to in 400 Days. Clementine learns Carver seeks to capture Rebecca believing her to be carrying his child while she insists it is her husband Alvin's. They come into another group, discovering that Kenny, one of the survivors that Clementine traveled with from the first season and who had lost his wife and son to walkers, has managed to survive. In the midst of a walker attack, they are captured by Carver. Learning that a massive walker horde is approaching the strip mall and will readily overrun it, the group manages to escape with other prisoners, killing Carver in the process after he kills Alvin. During their escape, a woman that Kenny had taken a romantic interest in is bitten by a walker, forcing Clementine to intercede to kill her before she can turn, angering Kenny. As they regroup, Clementine becomes close to Jane, a loner that was part of the prisoners at Carver's camp and who teaches Clementine survival skills. Later, Rebecca dies after giving birth to a child, which they name Alvin Jr. (AJ) As winter sets in, Jane and Kenny become hostile towards each other, and Kenny's distrust of the group leads to a fraction of them fleeing from Kenny, Jane, Clementine, and Alvin Jr.. Jane forces Clementine to see what Kenny has become from witnessing the deaths of his loved ones by faking the death of Alvin Jr., and Clementine is forced to intercede, killing one of them and opting to continue with the other while overseeing to Alvin Jr. herself.

=== Michonne (2016) ===
No.	Title	Directed by	Written by	Original release date
1	"In Too Deep"	Kent Mudle	Meghan Thornton; Nicole Martinez	February 23, 2016
2	"Give No Shelter"	Sean Manning	Zack Keller; Andrew Hanson	March 29, 2016
3	"What We Deserve"	Jason Latino	Nicole Martinez; Erica Harrell; Desirée Proctor; Joshua Rubin	April 26, 2016

In June 2014, Telltale announced a three-episode series The Walking Dead: Michonne. The mini-series released on February 23, 2015 for PlayStation 4 and Xbox One; February 25, 2015 for iOS and Android; and March 1, 2015 for PC, and serves as a tie-in between the first two The Walking Dead seasons developed by Telltale. The series mostly focuses on Michonne's untold story on what took Michonne away from Rick, Ezekiel, and the rest of Rick Grimes' trusted group and what brought her back. Samira Wiley voiced Michonne in the game. The mini-series was originally scheduled to be released as downloadable content for Season 2. However, in December 2014, Telltale announced that the game would be released as a standalone title that would not require any previous game in the series to play

=== Season 3: A New Frontier (2016–17) ===
No. overall	No. in season	Title	Directed by	Written by	Original release date
12	1	"Ties That Bind - Part One"	Jason Latino	Brad Kane; Nick Breckon; Adam Esquenazi Douglas; Laura Jacqmin; Dan Martin; Desiree Proctor; Pierre Shorette; Michael Choung	December 20, 2016
13	2	"Ties That Bind - Part Two"	Rebekah Gamin Arcovitch	Brad Kane; Nick Breckon; Michael Choung; Adam Esquenazi Douglas; Laura Jacqmin; Dan Martin; Evan Skolnick; Timothy Williams	December 20, 2016
14	3	"Above the Law"	Chris Rebbert	James Windeler; Patrick Kevin Day; Adam Esquenazi Douglas; Laura Jacqmin; Adam Miller; Evan Skolnick	March 28, 2017
15	4	"Thicker Than Water"	Chris Rieser	Luke McMullen; Theresa Cooley; Patrick Kevin Day; Laura Jacqmin; Adam Miller; Evan M. Skolnick	April 25, 2017
16	5	"From the Gallows"	Jason Pyke	Adam Esquenazi Douglas	May 30, 2017

The third season of The Walking Dead launched with two episodes on December 20, 2016. The season plans to tie in all the possible endings from previous seasons without compromising the story to avoid pushing away new players to the series. In an interview with IGN, Kirkman stated that the third season would bring the video game closer to the comic book's time frame. It takes place a few years after the second season, and includes a somewhat older Clementine along with AJ, the infant she rescues at the end of Season 2 who is now a toddler. Clementine is a playable character along with a new character, Javier. A New Frontier uses the updated Telltale Tool, the same game engine Telltale used for Batman: The Telltale Series.

During the 2016 PAX Expo, Telltale revealed the third season was to be released in November 2016, with the subtitle "A New Frontier". Telltale later had to delay the first episode's release until December 20, 2016. Warner Bros. Interactive Entertainment published retail versions of Season 3 as part of a deal with Telltale for Batman that was released in August 2016. The physical edition was released on February 7, 2017, featuring the first episode on disc and download codes to obtain all future episodes of the series.

=== The Walking Dead Collection (2017) ===
Announced in November 2017, The Walking Dead Collection includes all episodes from the first three seasons, as well as "400 Days" and The Walking Dead: Michonne. The collection was released on PlayStation 4 and Xbox One on December 5, 2017. The content of the first two seasons and "400 Days" has been visually improved, reflecting on improvements Telltale has made in their engine since these seasons were first released, including high-definition texture mapping for all survivor characters, improved dynamic lighting, and upgrading the game's graphics to use DirectX 11 over DirectX 9. The older games also use the user interface elements developed for the third season as to provide a consistent interface to the players.

The Walking Dead Collection was nominated for the Tappan Zee Bridge Award for Best Remake at the New York Game Awards 2018.

=== Season 4: The Final Season (2018–19) ===
No. overall	No. in season	Title	Directed by	Written by	Release date
17	1	"Done Running"	Chris Rebbert, Vahram Antonian	Jessica Krause; Adam Esquenazi Douglas; Mary Kenney; Lauren Mee	August 14, 2018
18	2	"Suffer the Children"	Chris Rieser	Mary Kenney; Adam Esquenazi Douglas; Douglas Lieblich	September 25, 2018
19	3	"Broken Toys"	Ryan D. Chan, Chris Rieser	Lauren Mee; Adam Esquenazi Douglas; Mary Kenney	January 15, 2019
20	4	"Take Us Back"	Chris Rebbert	Adam Esquenazi Douglas; James Windeler; Chris Rebbert; Mary Kenney; Lauren Mee	March 26, 2019

Announced during the July 2017 San Diego Comic Con, The Walking Dead: The Final Season, launched as four-episode series on August 14, 2018 for Windows, PlayStation 4, and Xbox One, with a Nintendo Switch version to launch later that year. Episodes are expected to launch roughly each month through December 2018. Clementine will return as the lead character, voiced by Hutchinson, as Telltale found that fans of the series were not pleased with how little interactivity there was with Clementine in A New Frontier. Telltale wanted to have the final season call back to what fans had praised about the first season, and knew they needed to make Clementine the focus. With this direction, Telltale decided to make this the final season for The Walking Dead series so that they can create a satisfactory conclusion to Clementine's story arc. For this purpose, Telltale brought back Gary Whitta, the writer for the first season and "400 Days" content, to help close out Clementine's story.

The story follows from A New Frontier with Clementine having rescued AJ from the McCarroll Ranch, with an ellipsis a few years ahead, where AJ is now a young boy. With diminishing resources amid the apocalypse, Clementine and AJ find the importance of staying with communities of vital importance, meeting other characters who have little memory of the time before the downfall of society. Clementine starts to teach AJ the essentials of survival as Lee had taught her. Telltale had initially considered writing a version of Clementine that had become more jaded, but found this was far too different from the established version of the character, and reworked her to be more sympathetic.

The final season used the updated version of the Telltale Tool first introduced in Batman: The Telltale Series, along with improvements in the visual style to approach the style used in The Walking Dead comic. Some scenes will feature "unscripted" zombies who may attack Clementine if the player is not careful, creating new freeform combat sequences, while other parts of the game will continue to use quick-time events as from previous games.

Despite the title The Final Season, Telltale did not rule out future The Walking Dead games; Creative Director Kent Mudle said that The Final Season title represented the end of Clementine's journey from Telltale's view, but the franchise could be revisited through other characters.

However, due to the sudden near-closure of Telltale Games on September 21, 2018, only two of the four episodes were released and production on the latter two were cancelled, effectively leaving the season half-finished. Skybound Entertainment later stepped in to develop the rest of the season, re-hiring some ex-Telltale staff in the process, as Kirkman had felt it necessary to properly complete Clementine's story. Skybound has also acquired the publishing rights to all previous Telltale The Walking Dead games.

=== The Walking Dead: The Telltale Definitive Series (2019) ===
Skybound published The Walking Dead: The Telltale Definitive Series, which includes all episodes from all four seasons, as well as 400 Days and The Walking Dead: Michonne, for release on Windows, PlayStation 4 and Xbox One on September 10, 2019. Each of the previous episodes in the series was remastered to use the new rendering system that was introduced in The Final Season, and over ten hours of developer and voice actor commentary is added. Additional improvements have been made in character model movement and lip syncing.

=== Additional releases ===
In addition to the Definitive Series edition, Skybound has also published all four seasons (including the 400 Days content) for the Nintendo Switch by January 21, 2020, and republished all four seasons, 400 Days and Michonne on personal computer digital storefronts in January 2020, after they had been pulled from sale after Telltale Games' original closure.

== Main cast and characters ==
Character	Season One (2012)	Season Two (2013/14)	A New Frontier (2016/17)	The Final Season (2018/19)
Clementine	Melissa Hutchison	Melissa Hutchison	Melissa Hutchison	Melissa Hutchison
Lee Everett	Dave Fennoy	Dave Fennoy		Dave Fennoy
Kenny	Gavin Hammon	Gavin Hammon	Gavin Hammon	
Omid	Owen Thomas	Owen Thomas		
Christa	Mara Junot	Mara Junot		
Lilly	Nicki Rapp	Appears (determinant)		Nicki Rapp
Katjaa	Cissy Jones	Appears		
Kenny "Duck" Jr	Max Kaufman	Appears		
Ben Paul	Trevor Hoffman	Appears		
Larry	Terry McGovern			
Carley	Nicole Vigil			
Doug	Sam Joan			
Glenn Rhee	Nick Herman			
Mark	Mark Middleton			
Chuck	Roger L. Jackson			
Molly	Erin Yvette			
Alvin "AJ" Jr.		Appears	Appears	Tayla Parx
Jane		Christine Lakin	Christine Lakin	
William Carver		Michael Madsen	Appears	
Luke		Scott Porter		
Nick		Brian Bremer		
Pete		Brian Sommer		
Carlos		Kid Beyond		
Sarah		Louisa MacKintosh		
Alvin		Dorian Lockett		
Rebecca		Shay Moore		
Bonnie		Erin Yvette		
Sarita		Julia Farmer		
Mike		Dan White		
Arvo		Michael Ark		
Javier "Javi" Garcia			Jeff Schine	
Kate Garcia			Shelley Shenoy	
David Garcia			Alex Hernandez	
Gabriel Garcia			Raymond Ochoa	
Mariana Garcia			Vale de la Maza; Brenda Lorena Garcia	
Tripp			Troy Hall	
Eleanor			Kelley Crowder	
Conrad			William Christopher Stephens	
Francine			Valerie Arem	
Paul "Jesus" Monroe			Brandon Keener	
Max/Rufus			Sean Lynch	
Badger			Jon Curry	
Lonnie			Charles Halford	
Ava			Ally Johnson	
Joan			Jayne Taini	
Clinton Barnes			Andrew Heyl	
Paul Lingard			Yuri Lowenthal	
Abel				Alex Fernandez
Marlon				Ray Chase
Brody				Hedy Burress
Louis				Sterling Sulieman
Tennessee				Zaire Hampton
Violet				Gideon Adlon
Mitch				Robbie Daymond
Aasim				Ritesh Rajan
Omar				Keith Silverstein
Ruby				Ali Hillis
Willy				Justin Cowden
James				Johnny Yong Bosch
Minerva				Cherami Leigh

The Walking Dead video game series introduces new characters developed by Telltale for the games. Season One is based around Lee Everett (voiced by Dave Fennoy), a Georgia college professor who had been charged with murder, and was in the midst of being sent to prison at the start of the walker outbreak. Lee escapes and encounters young Clementine (voiced by Melissa Hutchison), hiding in her treehouse after her babysitter had turned and her parents not yet back from vacation. Lee becomes a protective figure to her to help reunite her with her parents. Within Season Two taking place about a year later, Clementine is now the central character, struggling to find a place in several survivor groups.

Other major characters include Kenny, a fisherman who has suffered numerous losses of family and loved ones and has become emotionally unstable, Luke, a former entrepreneur who carries himself logically than emotionally, Jane, a young lone-wolf woman that teaches Clementine the values of self-preservation that a person's life comes first than anybody else, Carver, a principle antagonist of Season Two that seeks out the group of survivors that Clementine has joined believing one carries his child, and A.J., the newborn infant that Carver seeks who Clementine takes care of after his mother succumbs to the elements. The fate of several characters are determinant based on the actions that the player has taken in previous episodes, or otherwise unresolved within the narrative of the games. As the game takes place within the comic's universe, there have been some character crossovers with the series; Hershel Greene, Shawn Greene and Glenn, three characters from the comic series, have appeared briefly in Season One. Michonne, a prominent comic character, is featured as the playable-character in the Michonne mini-series, which also features comic characters Pete, Siddiq, Elodie, Dominic and Colette (the latter two are mentioned, but not seen, in the comics). Jesus makes an appearance in The New Frontier.

== Reception ==
=== Sales ===
According to Telltale, the combined games in the series have sold over 50 million episodes worldwide by July 2017.

As of January 2025, The Walking Dead: The Telltale Definitive Series sold 80 million episodes and generated over $300 million in revenue.

=== Season 1 and 400 Days ===
The Walking Dead has received critical acclaim, with reviewers giving praise for the harsh emotional tone, the characters, story and the resemblance to the original comic book, although criticizing the graphical glitches. The game received over 80 Game of the Year awards and many other awards.

"Episode 1 – A New Day" received positive reviews. Aggregating review websites GameRankings and Metacritic calculated scores of 85.14% and 84/100, respectively, for the PlayStation 3 version, 83.87% and 79/100 for the Xbox 360 version, and 83.38% and 82/100 for the PC version. The game received various accolades including the IGN "Editors' Choice", PC Gamer "Editors' Choice", Xbox Editors' Choice Award, and the PlayStation Gold Award.

"Episode 2 – Starved for Help" received positive reviews. GameRankings and Metacritic calculated scores of 86.53% and 84/100, respectively, for the PC version, 86.26% and 84/100 for the Xbox 360 version, and 85.90% and 84/100 for the PlayStation 3 version. The game won the GameSpy E3 2012 award for "Best Adventure Game".

"Episode 3 – Long Road Ahead" received positive reviews. GameRankings and Metacritic calculated scores of 88.47% and 88/100, respectively, for the Xbox 360 version, 86.11% and 87/100 for the PlayStation 3 version, and 85.41% and 85/100 for the PC version. IGN's Greg Miller gave the game a 9 out of 10, saying "It's a disturbing, depressing and entertaining entry in a journey that's been nothing short of excellent so far." GameSpot gave the game an 8.5, saying "The Walking Dead has passed the midway point of its series of five episodes with every indication that the game will keep getting better right through to its inevitably depressing and unsettling conclusion." MTV also gave it a positive review, saying "Telltale has created a series of wrenching, emotional decisions in the middle of a collection of not-too-hard puzzles in a visually-impressive adaptation of the Robert Kirkman comic series (with some nods to the TV show)."

"Episode 4 – Around Every Corner" received positive reviews, but to a lesser extent than the previous episodes. GameRankings and Metacritic calculated scores of 84.00% and 80/100, respectively, for the PC version, 82.50% and 82/100 the Xbox 360 version, and 78.94% and 81/100 for the PlayStation 3 version.

"Episode 5 – No Time Left" received critical acclaim. GameRankings and Metacritic calculated scores of 94.75% and 89/100, respectively, for the PC version, 88.15% and 89/100 for the Xbox 360 version, and 87.75% and 88/100 for the PlayStation 3 version.

400 Days received positive reviews. GameRankings and Metacritic calculated scores of 78.20% and 78/100, respectively, for the PlayStation 3 version, 78.00% and 78/100 for the PC version, and 76.88% and 80/100 for the Xbox 360 version.

=== Season 2 ===
The Walking Dead: Season Two overall received generally positive reviews from critics earning praise for its atmosphere, tension, and Clementine's newly appointed role as the protagonist, but earned criticism for its lack of hub areas and certain aspects of its storytelling.

Episode 1 – All That Remains received positive reviews. Aggregating review websites GameRankings and Metacritic gave the PlayStation 3 version 81.29% and 82/100, the PC version 78.76% and 78/100 and the Xbox 360 version 77.50% and 80/100. Matt Liebl from GameZone gave the episode an 8.5/10, stating that it "...is just a taste of what's to come -- a mere setup for the horror that awaits us in the final four episodes."

Episode 2 – A House Divided received positive reviews. Aggregating review websites GameRankings and Metacritic gave the PlayStation 3 version 87.29% and 82/100, the PC version 81.39% and 81/100 and the Xbox 360 version 79.44% and 80/100. Mitch Dyer from IGN gave the episode a 9.5/10, saying it is one of the best episodes Telltale Games has ever made.

Episode 3 – In Harm's Way received positive reviews. Aggregating review websites GameRankings and Metacritic gave the PlayStation 3 version 82.43% and 80/100, the Xbox 360 version 82.25% and 82/100 and the PC version 82.22% and 81/100.

Episode 4 – Amid the Ruins received mixed to positive reviews. Aggregating review websites GameRankings and Metacritic gave the PlayStation 3 version 79.22% and 78/100, the PC version 78.58% and 78/100 and the Xbox 360 version 72.00% and 71/100.

Episode 5 – No Going Back received positive reviews, higher than its predecessor. Aggregating review websites GameRankings and Metacritic gave the PlayStation 3 version 81.67% and 87/100, the PC version 79.19% and 78/100 and the Xbox 360 version 77.00% and 84/100. Mitch Dyer of IGN gave the episode a 9.5/10 saying that the finale is "an impressive and intelligent episode, and among Telltale Games' finest stories."

=== Michonne ===
The Walking Dead: Michonne received mixed reviews from critics earning praise for its action sequences, atmosphere, and the character development of Michonne, but earned criticism for its story, side characters, short episode lengths, and graphical glitches.

=== Season 3: A New Frontier ===
The Walking Dead: A New Frontier received mixed-to-positive reviews from critics with particular praise directed at the game's updated graphics, new cast of characters, action sequences, and overall new direction. However, the short episode lengths and the treatment of the Season 2 endings were both subjects of criticism. The game's story and Clementine's shift to a supporting character were both met with a mixed response.

=== Season 4: The Final Season ===
The Walking Dead: The Final Season received generally positive reviews earning praise for its characterization, visuals, and upgraded gameplay mechanics, and is considered by both critics and fans to be an improvement over its predecessor and a return to form for the series.
