= The Walking Dead: A New Frontier =

2016 episodic graphic adventure video game

- Developer: Telltale Games
- Publisher: Telltale Games
- Directors: Jason Latino; Rebekah Gamin Arcovitch; Chris Rebbert; Chris Rieser; Jason Pyke
- Producer: Lisa Schulz
- Designers: Matt Boland; Jean-Francois Guastalla; Matt Allmer; Chris Schroyer; Stephen McManus
- Programmers: Randy Tudor; Grady Standard; David R. Chaverri
- Artist: Tara Rueping
- Writers: Brad Kane; James Windeler; Luke McMullen; Adam Esquenazi Douglas
- Composer: Jared Emerson-Johnson
- Series: The Walking Dead
- Engine: Telltale Tool
- Platforms: Android; iOS; Windows; PlayStation 4; Xbox One; Nintendo Switch
- Release: Episode 1: WW: December 20, 2016; Episode 2: WW: December 20, 2016; Episode 3: WW: March 28, 2017; Episode 4: WW: April 25, 2017; Episode 5: WW: May 30, 2017; Nintendo Switch: WW: January 21, 2020
- Genres: Graphic adventure; Interactive movie
- Mode: Single-player

The Walking Dead: A New Frontier (Note: Also known as The Walking Dead: Season Three, or The Walking Dead: Season 3 and TWD S3 on mobile platforms) is a 2016 episodic graphic adventure video game based on the comic book series of the same name developed by Telltale Games. It is the sequel to The Walking Dead: Season Two, and the third game in The Walking Dead video game series. The first two episodes were released in December 2016, while a retail season pass disc edition was released in February 2017, followed by the third through fifth episodes in each subsequent month, with the final episode released in May 2017. The game employs the same narrative structure as the past seasons, where player choice in one episode will have a permanent impact on future story elements. The player choices recorded in save files from the first two seasons and the additional episode 400 Days carry over into A New Frontier.

The game takes place in the same fictional world as the comic, where a zombie apocalypse has caused society to collapse. The main characters of the game are mostly original characters. Due to time skips in season two and between seasons two and three, the timeline is caught up to where the comics are. Clementine (voiced by Melissa Hutchison), who was the player's companion during the first season and the protagonist in Season Two, returns as a playable character, but the main protagonist of the season is an original character named Javier "Javi" Garcia (voiced by Jeff Schine). In A New Frontier, Javi and Clementine must work together with other survivors to rescue their respective families from the eponymous group, which Clementine used to be a member of.

Unlike the first two seasons, the game received mixed reviews from critics with praise aimed at its new cast of characters, updated engine, certain aspects of its choices and overall new direction, but criticism for the short episode lengths, treatment of the second season's endings, and Clementine's perceived shift to a supporting role. A fourth and final season, titled The Walking Dead: The Final Season, with Clementine as the main protagonist, was episodically released from August 2018 to March 2019.

== Gameplay ==
Similar to the previous seasons, The Walking Dead: A New Frontier is a point-and-click adventure game. In contrast to previous seasons, there are two playable characters: Clementine, the heroine from the previous games; and Javier, a new character introduced this season. The player can examine and interact with various scenery elements and collect and use objects to advance the story. They can also initiate conversations with non-player characters via conversation trees. Certain replies from other characters may offer the player multiple choices to select from, including the option to stay silent, with a limited amount of time to make the selection; if the player does not select an option, the conversation will continue as if they had stayed quiet. Such choices can affect how the other characters will later react to the player character, which can influence later events in the story. Other scenes are more action-oriented, requiring the player to complete quick time events to prevent the player character or their allies from getting killed. If the player fails these events, the game will restart at the start of such scenes. Such action scenes may also require the player to make a key decision within a limited time frame, such as which of two characters to save from attacking walkers.

The player's choices and actions will impact story elements in later episodes; for example, a character that the player does not choose to be saved will not appear in later scenes. A New Frontier incorporates player choices made in previous games in the series through existing save files. The player is offered multiple options for how they can bring in previous saves into the game, including those who switched their choice of platform prior to A New Frontier. While A New Frontier was not released for the PlayStation 3 or Xbox 360, players who have saves from Season Two on these platforms are able to download a patch on those consoles as to upload their saved game to Telltale's servers, and then access that from their new choice of platform. Telltale also provided a separate tool for players to "quick-create a tailored backstory" for Clementine to this point, with a possible 42 different variations, and create a save file from which to start the new season with. Players may also opt to use the default backstory that Telltale created as the basis for the game. Unlike the first two seasons, the third makes extensive use of a flashback narrative structure.

A New Frontier was originally meant to come to both PlayStation 3 and Xbox 360, but these versions were cancelled roughly 3 weeks before launch, leading to criticism of Telltale for falsely promising they would come to last generation hardware. Notably, the GameStop and Best Buy websites had both a PlayStation 3, and an Xbox 360 version of the game available up for sale respectively.

== Premise and plot ==
=== Setting ===
The Walking Dead: A New Frontier follows on the first game, and coincides with events of the comic books, in which a zombie apocalypse has occurred, turning humans that are bitten or die into zombies, or "walkers"; the only way to stop this conversion is to damage the brain. The game is primarily set four years after the apocalypse began, and roughly two years after The Walking Dead: Season Two.

A New Frontier features two playable protagonists: Javier "Javi" Garcia (Jeff Schine), a former professional baseball player living with his sister-in-law Kate (Shelley Shenoy) and nephew, Gabe (Raymond Ochoa) and niece, Mariana (Vale de la Maza); and Clementine (Melissa Hutchison), a young teenager trying to survive on her own while continuing to look after Alvin Jr., the baby from the last season. Possibly also returning are either Kenny (Gavin Hammon) or Jane (Christine Lakin), depending on the player's decisions from the previous season. During the season, Javi's group is joined by Paul "Jesus" Monroe (Brandon Keener), the ambassador of the Hilltop community appearing in the comic series, and several survivors from the idyllic town of Prescott, including their leader Tripp (Troy Hall), town doctor Eleanor (Kelly Crowder), and bartender Conrad (William Christopher Stephens). Later episodes introduce the New Frontier, a larger group of survivors who have "lost their way" due to past events. The group is led by four people: Joan (Jayne Taini), the head of diplomacy; Dr. Paul Lingard (Yuri Lowenthal), the head of medicine; Clinton "Clint" Barnes (Andrew Heyl), the head of rations and food; and Javi's older brother and Kate's ex-husband David (Alex Hernandez), the head of security. Other members include David's right-hand woman Ava (Ally Johnson), and scouts Badger (Jon Curry), Max (Sean Lynch), and Lonnie (Charles Halford).

=== Plot ===
This is a broad overview of the plot. Certain decisions made by the player will alter details of specific events.

At the onset of the walker pandemic, Javi is living in Baltimore with David, Kate, Gabe, and Mariana. After Javi and David's father dies of cancer, he reanimates and bites their mother. David takes her to the hospital but does not return, while Javi and Kate eventually move on with Gabe and Mariana. Four years later, while scavenging for supplies at a junkyard, the four have a run-in with a group led by Max, Badger, and Lonnie. Javi is separated and captured, but rescued by Clementine. Clementine takes Javi to Prescott, a fortified community, where he meets Tripp, Conrad, and Eleanor. Tripp and Eleanor both offer Javi help to rescue his family.

During their rescue attempt, Mariana is shot dead, and Kate is critically wounded by Badger and his men. Clementine identifies the attackers as members of the New Frontier, a large group of survivors she had once met. The group returns to Prescott to treat Kate's injuries, but Badger arrives with reinforcements and releases a horde of walkers. Javi, Clementine, Kate, Gabe, Tripp, Eleanor, and Conrad escape and decide to travel to another survivor camp in Richmond, Virginia. They encounter Jesus, who reveals Richmond is now controlled by the New Frontier. After a while, Clementine reveals to Javi that she is a former member of the New Frontier. Hearing their conversation, Conrad mistakenly believes Clementine is still a member and holds her at gunpoint, suggesting that they use her as a bargaining chip to secure safe entry into Richmond.

The group eventually reaches Richmond and is let in after David is called. While Kate and Gabe are taken to Dr. Lingard for medical care, David shows Javi around Richmond and brings him to Clint and Joan to argue his case for staying in Richmond. Max soon arrives and accuses Javi of stealing New Frontier supplies and killing his men at the junkyard. Although David supports Javi, Joan and Clint decide to exile him and his group. Before they leave, David asks the group to meet him at a warehouse.

At the warehouse, Clementine accuses David of causing AJ's death by not allowing her to inject him when he fell ill. To everyone's surprise, however, David reveals AJ survived, and Lingard knows his whereabouts. The group then discover crates from Prescott and other communities, revealing Richmond's hand in attacking said communities. When Max, Badger, and Lonnie arrive there, the group kills Badger and interrogates Max, who admits that Joan was behind the Prescott massacre and Mariana's death. Jesus takes his leave to warn his group while the others return to Richmond to confront Joan. However, Joan turns on David by labeling him as a conspirator, ordering his execution in the town square, and imprisons Javi. Javi escapes confinement and organizes his group, aiming to rescue David. Javi meets Clementine at the hospital, where Lingard, no longer able to cope with the New Frontier's actions, demands being killed by injection in exchange for information on AJ's whereabouts.

Javi's bid to expose Joan fails via a betrayal from Eleanor and is forced to choose between saving a captured Tripp or Ava. Joan then murders the person Javi chose to be spared. David is soon rescued as a firefight breaks out. Kate races into the square but crashes into a fence, which opens a breach and allows walkers to pour through. The group barricades themselves in an apartment building and plans on how to save Richmond. However, David views Richmond as a lost cause and suggests leaving the city. Jealous of Javi and Kate's growing closeness, David fights his brother until walkers begin to close in on them. As David leaves in a truck with Gabe, Kate decides to man a bulldozer to save Richmond. Jesus returns with reinforcements and helps the survivors round up the walkers and lead them out of Richmond, saving the town.

Days later, Javi memorializes the ones lost and meets Jesus, who suggests that he becomes Richmond's new leader. After Javi gives Clementine a new haircut, they bid goodbye and she departs to find AJ.

== Episodes ==
The game is separated into five episodes, like the first and second seasons.

No. overall	No. in season	Title	Directed by	Written by	Original release date
12	1	"Ties That Bind - Part One"	Jason Latino	Brad Kane; Nick Breckon; Adam Esquenazi Douglas; Laura Jacqmin; Dan Martin; Desiree Proctor; Pierre Shorette; Michael Choung	December 20, 2016
After Javier and his family cross paths with an aggressive group, a simple misunderstanding will send everything spiraling out of control.
13	2	"Ties That Bind - Part Two"	Rebekah Gamin Arcovitch	Brad Kane; Nick Breckon; Michael Choung; Adam Esquenazi Douglas; Laura Jacqmin; Dan Martin; Evan Skolnick; Timothy Williams	December 20, 2016
Javier, Clementine, and the remnants of Prescott press onwards towards a community in Richmond in order to seek medical attention for the dying Kate.
14	3	"Above the Law"	Chris Rebbert	James Windeler; Patrick Kevin Day; Adam Esquenazi Douglas; Laura Jacqmin; Adam Miller; Evan Skolnick	March 28, 2017
The group is faced with a shocking revelation after arriving in Richmond.
15	4	"Thicker Than Water"	Chris Rieser	Luke McMullen; Theresa Cooley; Patrick Kevin Day; Laura Jacqmin; Adam Miller; Evan M. Skolnick	April 25, 2017
After escaping from confinement, Javier and the group devise a way to rescue David and take down Joan.
16	5	"From the Gallows"	Jason Pyke	Adam Esquenazi Douglas	May 30, 2017
All hell breaks loose when the walls are destroyed and the dead begin to overtake Richmond.

== Development ==
When Telltale Games acquired the right to make video games based on The Walking Dead comics, they signed a contract for a "multi-year, multi-platform, multi-title" license. This license went into effect after the success of the first season of The Walking Dead, when Telltale commissioned a second series of games based on the franchise. The first season was considered highly successful, helping to revitalize the adventure game genre which had been in decline since the mid-1990s, with Telltale being recognized as one of the top development studios in 2012.

Telltale's Sean Ainsworth and Dennis Lenart stated that the third season featured a "new angle" from the story. It was confirmed by Robert Kirkman that Clementine would return in Season 3. During an E3 2015 discussion with Greg Miller and Job Stauffer, Stauffer implied that Season 3 was "a long ways off" and "considerably larger" than previous games. Stauffer hinted that some characters from the comic would appear in Season 3.

Season 3 was planned to tie in all the possible endings that players from previous seasons might have taken, as well as draw in new players to the series. With the planned influx of new players and those who transitioned off older consoles and did not have access to their save games, Telltale provided a story generator tool that asks the player several questions as to customize a starting point for A New Frontier. These questions were developed by evaluating around 40,000 playthroughs that covered Season One and Two, and grouping the general pattern of choices made by players into a total of 42 distinct scenarios, from which they derived questions that would help guide a new player to fall in one of these sets. Bruner said they were more looking at patterns of behavior rather than specific decisions that had been made; for example, the decision whether to kill Lee at his request before he turns or leave him at the end of Season One was found to be "representative of some pretty complicated motivations" of the sum of players' choices in the game, and thus wanted this story generator to capture the motivation rather than the result.

In an interview with IGN, Kirkman stated that the third season would bring the video game closer to the comic book's current time frame at the time of its planned release. This season takes place a few years after Season Two, and includes a somewhat older Clementine along with AJ, the infant she rescues at the end of Season Two and now a toddler. Clementine is a playable character along with a new character, Javier.

During PAX 2016, Telltale revealed the third season would be released in November 2016, with the subtitle A New Frontier. In December 2016, Telltale announced the game would not be released on PlayStation 3 and Xbox 360. Telltale later had to delay the first episode's release until December 20, 2016. Warner Bros. Interactive Entertainment published retail versions of Season 3 as part of a deal with Telltale for Batman that was released in August 2016. The physical edition released on February 24, 2017, in North America and March 3, 2017, in Europe; it contains the first two episodes on disc and digital codes to redeem the other episodes.

A Nintendo Switch version was released in 2020.

=== Soundtrack ===
On September 10, 2019, an official soundtrack album of Jared Emerson-Johnson's score to the game was released for digital download and on streaming services, with a special edition set of vinyl lps due to release shortly thereafter.

== Sequel ==
In July 2017, Telltale Games and Skybound Entertainment announced the fourth and final season titled The Walking Dead: The Final Season, which was released from August 2018 to March 2019.

== Reception ==
Aggregate review scores
Game	Metacritic
Episode 1: Ties That Bind Part One	(PC) 81 (PS4) 80 (XONE) 78
Episode 2: Ties That Bind Part Two	(PC) 80 (PS4) 80 (XONE) 78
Episode 3: Above the Law	(PC) 75 (PS4) 69 (XONE) 73
Episode 4: Thicker Than Water	(PC) 72 (PS4) 65 (XONE) 73
Episode 5: From The Gallows	(PC) 74 (PS4) 71 (XONE) 64

The Walking Dead: A New Frontier received mixed reviews from critics with praise aimed at its new cast of characters, updated engine, and overall new direction, but criticism for the short episode lengths, treatment of the second season's endings, and Clementine's shift to a supporting role.

=== Episode 1: Ties That Bind Part One ===
Aggregating review website Metacritic gave the Windows version 81/100 based on 35 reviews, the PlayStation 4 version 80/100 based on 10 reviews and the Xbox One version 78/100 based on 14 reviews.

=== Episode 2: Ties That Bind Part Two ===
Aggregating review website Metacritic gave the Windows version 80/100 based on 33 reviews, the PlayStation 4 version 80/100 based on 9 reviews and the Xbox One version 78/100 based on 13 reviews.

=== Episode 3: Above the Law ===
Aggregating review website Metacritic gave the Windows version 75/100 based on 29 reviews, the PlayStation 4 version 69/100 based on 8 reviews and the Xbox One version 73/100 based on 6 reviews.

=== Episode 4: Thicker Than Water ===
Aggregating review website Metacritic gave the Windows version 72/100 based on 28 reviews, the PlayStation 4 version 65/100 based on 5 reviews and the Xbox One version 73/100 based on 4 reviews.

=== Episode 5: From the Gallows ===
Aggregating review website Metacritic gave the Windows version 74/100 based on 23 reviews, the PlayStation 4 version 71/100 based on 5 reviews and the Xbox One version 59/100 based on 6 reviews.
