= The Walking Dead: The Final Season =

2018 episodic graphic adventure video game

- Developers: Telltale Games (episodes 1–2); Skybound Games (episodes 3–4)
- Publishers: Telltale Games; Skybound Games
- Directors: Kent Mudle; Chris Rebbert; Vahram Antonian; Chris Rieser; Ryan D. Chan
- Designers: Michael Kirkbride; Jean Francois Guastalla; Emily Grace Buck; Mark Darin
- Writers: James Windeler; Jessica Krause; Mary Kenney; Lauren Mee; Adam Esquenazi Douglas; Chris Rebbert
- Composer: Jared Emerson-Johnson
- Series: The Walking Dead
- Engine: Telltale Tool
- Platforms: Nintendo Switch; PlayStation 4; Windows; Xbox One
- Release: Episode 1: August 14, 2018; Episode 2: September 25, 2018; Episode 3: January 15, 2019; Episode 4: March 26, 2019
- Genres: Graphic adventure; Interactive movie
- Mode: Single-player

The Walking Dead: The Final Season is a 2018 episodic graphic adventure video game developed by Telltale Games and later Skybound Games, and the fourth and final main installment in Telltale's The Walking Dead video game series, based on the comic book series of the same name. It consists of four episodes released between August 2018 and March 2019. Taking place some years after The Walking Dead: A New Frontier, the game focuses on Clementine's efforts to raise young Alvin Jr. (AJ) in the post-apocalyptic world, coming to join with a group of troubled teenagers surviving out of their former boarding school. Their path leads them to encounter a hostile group of raiders led by a figure from Clementine's past.

The game represents the first major release by Telltale after a major restructuring; it was aimed to return to themes and elements from the first season, and expected to be the concluding story for Clementine. The game was anticipated to be released over four episodes, with the first episode released in August 2018, for the Nintendo Switch, PlayStation 4, Windows, and Xbox One. However, due to the sudden closure of Telltale in the following month, the last two episodes were overseen by Skybound Entertainment, the production company of The Walking Dead comic creator Robert Kirkman, using as many of the former Telltale development team as possible, as Kirkman had felt it necessary to properly complete Clementine's story.

== Gameplay ==
As with other games in The Walking Dead series, The Final Season is a graphic adventure game, where the player controls the protagonist Clementine as she struggles to survive in the wake of a zombie apocalypse. The player can move Clementine around the environment to examine and collect items and initiate conversation trees with non-player characters, and progress in the game. The Final Season introduces a collectible mechanic, where the player can collect certain items in the world and place them in their room later. Some collectibles can only be obtained on the basis of choices. For each episode, a certain amount of collectibles are to be found. Decisions made by the player can affect future episodes, and The Final Season can use previous saved games from The Walking Dead to bring a player's choices from these games into The Final Season. Players that have not played previous seasons, or who may want to adjust choices made affecting Clementine's character, can use a web-based Story Builder tool to create a cloud-based save to feed into the game. This also addresses issues with various save game limitations due to platform transitions over the course of the series. For example, previous saves from the Xbox 360 and PlayStation 3 versions of the first two seasons are not compatible with The Final Season.

The Final Season was included in The Walking Dead: The Telltale Definitive Series, which was released on September 10, 2019, for PS4, Xbox, and PC. It included graphical overhauls to the previous releases, concept art, and a way to carry over choices from previous seasons for players willing to play through each season.

In portions of the game, the player will be required to react to quick time events in action-driven scenes, such as escaping from a "walker", the name for zombies in the series. Failure to complete the events typically results in the death of Clementine or another key character, requiring the player to retry the event. The Final Season introduces more open-ended action sequences that give the player more control during them.

== Setting and characters ==
The Final Season takes place roughly seven years after the events of the first one. It is set in the same continuity of the comic book series, and it is located in West Virginia, in a world where society has collapsed after a zombie outbreak. It once again stars Clementine (Melissa Hutchison), who is now an older teenager, after she has reunited with Alvin Jr., "AJ" (Tayla Parx), the son of Rebecca, and her efforts to raise and protect him in the post-apocalyptic world, similarly to how her past guardian and caretaker Lee Everett (Dave Fennoy) once did with her.

Clementine and AJ join a group of teenage survivors inhabiting their former boarding school. They are led by Marlon (Ray Chase), and are made up by Louis (Sterling Sulieman), Violet (Gideon Adlon), Tennessee, "Tenn" (Zaire Hampton), Willy (Justin Cowden), Omar (Keith Silverstein), Ruby (Ali Hillis), Aasim (Ritesh Rajan), Brody (Hedy Burress), and Mitch (Robbie Daymond).

The Delta is a faction of raiders who antagonize Clementine and the other children. Their members include Abel (Alex Fernandez), Minerva, "Minnie" (Cherami Leigh), one of Tenn's older sisters and Violet's ex-girlfriend, and Lilly (Nicki Rapp), a former member of Clementine's old survivor group from Macon, Georgia from the first season. Other characters in the game include James (Johnny Yong Bosch), a pacifistic ex-Whisperer, the children's pet dog Rosie, and Eddie (Brandon Bales), a character from the 400 Days DLC add-on for the first season, who briefly appears in a flashback.

== Plot ==
Shortly after the events of A New Frontier, Clementine rescues AJ from McCarroll Ranch after it is attacked, and is forced to kill AJ's caretaker in self-defense. Years later, Clementine has continued to raise AJ, recalling the lessons Lee taught her. While scavenging for food, the two end up in a car crash from which they are saved by a group of abandoned teenagers, operating from the ruins of Ericson's Boarding School for Troubled Youth. While acclimating to living in the school, Clementine and AJ return to scavenging and encounter a man named Abel, who tries to rob them. After informing the others at the school of their encounter, Clementine finds the group's leader Marlon having a heated argument with another resident, Brody. Brody reveals to Clementine that Abel is part of a raider group that Marlon had traded resident twin sisters Minerva and Sophie to in exchange for safety a year ago and that he also intends to trade her and AJ should the raiders return. Marlon accidentally kills Brody out of rage for revealing this and tries to frame Clementine for her death to the rest of the children. Clementine convinces the others of Marlon's wrongdoings, but before anything else can be done, AJ kills him.

Clementine and AJ are evicted from the school. Outside, they are attacked by Abel and another member of the raiders, Lilly, the woman who either left or was banished from Lee's group during the first season. Lilly attempts to coerce Clementine to convince the other kids to join her group, but she refuses and escapes with AJ, which leads to AJ being shot. The pair are saved by James, a former member of the Whisperers, who tells them the raiders are forcibly recruiting people for a war against a rival community. Clementine returns to Ericson for medical treatment for AJ and to warn them about the raiders. The children prepare the school grounds for an attack. Two weeks later, the raiders arrive and though they are pushed back, they manage to kidnap some of the children and murder one of them. The children learn from a captured, dying Abel that the raiders have established camp in a nearby riverboat and with James' help, infiltrate the boat and plant a homemade bomb in its boiler before encountering Minerva, now a member of the raiders, who imprisons them with the others. Lilly confronts Clementine and reveals that Minerva killed Sophie when she tried to escape their group.

Clementine incapacitates Minerva, frees the children, and fights Lilly into submission, who is then held at gunpoint by AJ. Clementine can tell him to kill or spare her; if spared, Lilly murders James. During the chaos, the bomb goes off and the ship explodes. Clementine and AJ escape the sinking boat as Lilly (if spared) flees on a raft while the other raiders are overwhelmed by walkers. If James is alive, he leaves the group after arguing with Clementine over AJ killing Lilly, potentially aiding their escape, depending on choices. Clementine, AJ, and Tenn meet with either Louis or Violet, who leads them back to Ericson. After reaching a partially collapsed bridge, the group is attacked by a bitten, crazed Minerva, who has led a horde of walkers to them. Clementine fights off Minerva, who slashes her ankle, and crosses the bridge with AJ. Louis or Violet try to make Tenn cross as well, but he is too stunned to move; if Clementine previously trusted AJ, putting the confidence in him to make hard decisions, he shoots Tenn to save Louis or Violet, otherwise, he will tell Louis or Violet to throw Tenn across the gap, thus saving him, but resulting in the other person getting devoured.

While escaping the horde, a walker bites Clementine's wounded leg. Clementine and AJ take shelter in James' barn, which is quickly surrounded by walkers. A weakened Clementine urges AJ to escape on his own by covering himself in walker guts, then asks him to either kill her or leave her to turn. Regardless of her request, AJ swings Minerva's axe at her. Sometime later, it is revealed that AJ chose to amputate Clementine's leg, saving her life, and the two have finally found peace and a home at Ericson.

== Episodes ==
The game is separated into four episodes, originally intended to be released every six weeks.

No. overall	No. in season	Title	Directed by	Written by	Release date
17	1	"Done Running"	Chris Rebbert, Vahram Antonian	Jessica Krause; Adam Esquenazi Douglas; Mary Kenney; Lauren Mee	August 14, 2018
Clementine and AJ join a new group made entirely of children set up in Ericson's School for Troubled Youth. Clementine aims to prove their worth to the group by helping out while AJ has trouble fitting in. They learn the recent loss of twin sisters, Sophie and Minerva, has left many in the community heartbroken. After a tense encounter with a stranger who has been stealing the group's food, Clementine learns the secret behind how Ericson has remained safe for so long. The episode ends with AJ making a troubling decision of his own.
18	2	"Suffer the Children"	Chris Rieser	Mary Kenney; Adam Esquenazi Douglas; Douglas Lieblich	September 25, 2018
Clementine and AJ are exiled from Ericson, and they run into a figure from Clementine's past, now a new threat to their safety. Helped by a former Whisperer, the pair returns to the school to help the students prepare for an enemy attack. After the raiders make their move, Clementine is forced to choose between two friends, and prepares for vengeance against the raiders.
19	3	"Broken Toys"	Ryan D. Chan, Chris Rieser	Lauren Mee; Adam Esquenazi Douglas; Mary Kenney	January 15, 2019
As Clementine, AJ, and their friends prepare for a dangerous rescue mission, they resort to using walkers to infiltrate the raiders' base, enlisting the help of a past ally. Once inside enemy territory, conflicting loyalties are put to the test as Clementine makes AJ do a tough decision.
20	4	"Take Us Back"	Chris Rebbert	Adam Esquenazi Douglas; James Windeler; Chris Rebbert; Mary Kenney; Lauren Mee	March 26, 2019
With their enemies' base destroyed, Clementine, AJ, and the others make one final, dangerous journey back to Ericson as the threat of both the dead and the living sets upon them.

== Development ==
Announced at San Diego Comic-Con 2017, The Walking Dead: The Final Season, was launched on August 14, 2018, for Windows, PlayStation 4, and Xbox One, with plans for a Nintendo Switch version to launch later that year. Clementine returned as the lead character, voiced by Melissa Hutchison, as Telltale found that fans of the series were not pleased with how little interactivity there was with Clementine in A New Frontier. Telltale wanted to have the final season call back to what fans had praised about the first season, and knew they needed to make Clementine the focus. With this direction, Telltale decided to make this the final season for The Walking Dead series so that they could create a satisfactory conclusion to Clementine's story arc. For this purpose, Telltale brought back Gary Whitta, the writer for the first season and 400 Days content, to help close out Clementine's story.

The story followed from A New Frontier with Clementine having rescued AJ from the McCarroll Ranch, with an ellipsis a few years ahead, where AJ is now a young boy. Telltale had initially considered writing a version of Clementine that had become more jaded, but found this was far too different from the established version of the character, and reworked her to be more sympathetic.

The Final Season used the updated version of the Telltale Tool first introduced in Batman: The Telltale Series, along with improvements in the visual style to approach the style used in The Walking Dead comic. This included improved dynamic lighting, and a new rendering style Telltale called "Graphic Black" to enforce the comic book rendering style. Some scenes featured "unscripted" zombies who may attack Clementine if the player is not careful, creating new freeform combat sequences, while other parts of the game used quick-time events as from previous games.

Due to course-corrections made at Telltale in 2017, The Final Season was primarily the only game the company released that year, cutting down from twenty episodes across multiple games in 2017 to only this season's four in 2018. The game's executive producer Brodie Andersen said that "We know we ran a little hot in previous years and weren't able to fully deliver the experiences we may have wanted to, so that was important to focus on polished quality experience players love." Because of the reduced product schedule, Telltale was able to establish firm release dates for all four episodes in the season, a first for any of Telltale's episodic series. Andersen said that they were able to achieve this by starting from where they wanted The Final Season to end, and then building the narrative backward from that, establishing four clear episodes for the series to work towards. The game's story, with major plot points and milestones for all four episodes, were established early between creative director Kent Mudle, lead writer James Windeler, lead designer Mike Kirkbride, and seasoned writer Chris Rebbert, and which had little micromanagement from the new Telltale executives.

A free demo of the game, offering approximately the first twenty minutes of the first episode, meant to show off the new gameplay features added in this season, was released for the PlayStation 4 and Xbox One on July 31, 2018.

Despite the title, Telltale originally did not rule out a possible future for The Walking Dead games; creative director Kent Mudle said that the title represented the end of Clementine's journey from Telltale's view, but could revisit the franchise through other characters.

=== Transition to Skybound ===
On September 21, 2018, Telltale announced they were undergoing a "majority studio closure", laying off nearly all staff and leaving only 25 to complete the studio's remaining obligations.

The news came as a shock to both the developers and voice actors working on the project. Melissa Hutchison, Clementine's voice actress, said that the cancellation was traumatic and she received the news in the midst of a recording session, which had to be cut short.

The state of The Final Season was unknown, though other planned studio projects were cancelled. The second episode was still released on September 25, 2018, while those within Telltale stated that they were halfway through completing the third episode when the news broke; they had cleared the narrative with Skybound and had done the first pass of voice work for the episode. Telltale stated on September 24, 2018, that the studio was approached by "multiple potential partners" that wanted to help bring these two episodes to completion in some manner. Until they were able to figure out how the last two episodes would be played out, Telltale asked retailers and digital storefronts to pull sales of the game and the season pass.

At that time, Skybound Entertainment, the publishing company that Kirkman started to support licensing of The Walking Dead and other properties, were starting to explore a video game division, and had started a small Skybound Games division led by Ian Howe around five months before Telltale's closure. Skybound had already been working closely with Telltale prior to their first The Walking Dead season to help Telltale figure out the type of story they wanted to tell, inspired by the comic book's approach. This led to creating the video game series with a focus on a singular character, Clementine. In return, Skybound gained an appreciation of what interactive experiences and video games mean alongside all the other venues (comics, television, and so forth) they were exploring, and saw it as an essential element of their "Wheel of Awesome" to extend The Walking Dead and their other properties into other markets. The intent of Skybound Games was to work with third-party developers, rather than hosting its own development team.

When Telltale announced its closure, Skybound Entertainment saw the potential of using this to kickstart Skybound Games. According to Howe, Kirkman had said after Telltale contacted them about the news that that Skybound should just get Clementine's story finished as her character partially influenced how Skybound would expand its businesses. Howe traveled to meet with the 50-some developers that had been working on The Final Season, and explained the situation, in that Skybound was interested in supporting the game through completion, and wanted the original Telltale team on board to support this, but could not promise any sustained job afterward and being upfront about what they did not know at that time. Finding that most of the Telltale team were eager to help finish out the game, Howe's team began to seek out the financial and other logistical support needed. They acquired the rights to the Telltale The Walking Dead games, and were able to negotiate with the landlord of the former Telltale offices to establish working space there as to minimize any disruption to the team members and not require them to relocate. Other Telltale members made personal sacrifices to make sure the game got done, and Skybound did as much as possible to support these members, and provided allowances for team members to continue to search for jobs following the game's completion. Not all of the Telltale team stayed on due to the lack of long-term job security or had already accepted other job offers. Overall, it took about two months from Telltale's closure in September for Skybound to complete all the preparations and legal requirements to restart development.

According to Mudle, who stayed with the Telltale team in transitioning to Skybound, the final episode of the series was always meant to be treated as a closure to one era of Telltale as they were transitioning to a new engine with plans for new mechanics to break the mold of their adventure game approach; the last episode was to have included hints of these new mechanics. Following the studio closure, the final episode became more poignant, leaving some of those elements in but otherwise treating it as a tribute to Telltale's legacy. However, continuing the development at Skybound was aided by all the planning work they had done at Telltale, according to Mudle, making the transition less difficult.

Kirkman officially announced Skybound's involvement in finishing The Final Season during the 2018 New York Comic Con in October. Skybound announced in November 2018 that the former Telltale team, now named "Still Not Bitten Team", had restarted work on The Final Season. Howe had anticipated that the third episode would be released before the end of 2018. Spanish and Portuguese voice dubbing for the remaining episodes was dropped for budgetary reasons.

Skybound also affirmed that they gained the rights to sell the former The Walking Dead games, and would not require anyone that had already purchased a season pass for The Final Season to buy one again once the last two episodes were released. Users that had purchased the title before Telltale's closure on Steam or on GOG would receive the final episodes on those platforms, but otherwise, the season was moved to the Epic Games Store for all new purchasers. According to Skybound, Epic Games had helped with the season's completion following Telltale's closure, and thus Skybound felt it was necessary to offer the game through their platform. Skybound produced a physical release of The Final Season for the PlayStation 4, Xbox One, and Nintendo Switch on March 26, 2019; the season pass disc contains the first three episodes and grants access to download the remaining episode.

Following the completion of the major development, about 15 team members remained at Skybound to help support bug and console fixes. Skybound explored options of either keeping the remaining team aboard once they had completed all essential work or potentially spinning them off as a separate studio that would work with Skybound Games in the future.

=== Soundtrack ===
On September 10, 2019, an official soundtrack album of Jared Emerson-Johnson's score to the game was released for digital download and on streaming services, with a special edition set of vinyl LPs due to be released shortly thereafter.

== Reception ==
Aggregate review scores
Game	Metacritic
Complete Season	(PC) 77 (PS4) 78 (XONE) 78 (NS) 80
Episode 1 — Done Running	(PC) 76 (PS4) 75 (XONE) 72 (NS) 75
Episode 2 — Suffer the Children	(PC) 69 (PS4) 71 (XONE) 75 (NS) 70
Episode 3 — Broken Toys	(PC) 74 (PS4) 78 (XONE) 80 (NS) 80
Episode 4 — Take Us Back	(PC) 79 (PS4) 75 (XONE) 85 (NS) 83

The Walking Dead: The Final Season received generally positive reviews, earning praise for its characters, visuals, and upgraded gameplay mechanics, and is generally considered by critics and fans to be both an improvement over the previous two seasons and a return to form for the series.

=== Episode 1 — Done Running ===
Aggregating review website Metacritic gave the PC version 76/100 based on 28 reviews, the PlayStation 4 version 75/100 based on 14 reviews, the Xbox One version 72/100 based on 10 reviews, and the Nintendo Switch version 75/100 based on 6 reviews.

=== Episode 2 — Suffer the Children ===
On Metacritic, the PC version of the episode has a rating of 69/100 based on 18 reviews, the PS4 version has a rating of 71/100 based on 7 reviews, the Xbox One version has a rating of 75/100 based on 4 reviews, the Nintendo Switch version has a rating of 70 based on 5 reviews.

=== Episode 3 — Broken Toys ===
On Metacritic, the PC version has a 74/100 average score based on 19 reviews, the PS4 version has a 78/100 average score based on 10 reviews, the Xbox One version has an 80/100 average score based on 4 reviews, and the Nintendo Switch version has an 80/100 average score based on 4 reviews.

=== Episode 4 — Take Us Back ===
On Metacritic, the PC version has a rating of 79/100 based on 14 reviews, the PS4 version has a rating of 75/100 based on 10 reviews, the Xbox One version has a rating of 85/100 based on 4 reviews, and the Nintendo Switch version has a rating of 83/100 based on 4 reviews.

=== Accolades ===
The game was nominated for "Game, Franchise Adventure" and "Performance in a Drama" with Melissa Hutchison at the NAVGTR Awards, and for the GLAAD Media Award for Outstanding Video Game featuring an LGBTQ character.

== See also ==
- Oh My Darling, Clementine
