= The Walking Dead: Season Two =

2013 episodic graphic adventure video game

- Developer: Telltale Games
- Publisher: Telltale Games
- Directors: Dennis Lenart; Eric Parsons; Graham Ross; Jason Latino; Sean Ainsworth
- Producers: Sara Guinness; Kirsten Kennedy
- Designers: Mark Darin; Sean Ainsworth; Stephen McManus; Harrison G. Pink
- Programmers: Randy Tudor; David R. Chaverri
- Artist: Derek Sakai
- Writers: Nick Breckon; Andrew Grant; Pierre Shorette; JT Petty; Eric Stirpe
- Composer: Jared Emerson-Johnson
- Series: The Walking Dead
- Engine: Telltale Tool
- Platforms: Windows, OS X, PlayStation 3, Xbox 360, iOS, PlayStation Vita, PlayStation 4, Xbox One, Nintendo Switch, Ouya, Android
- Release: Episode 1: Windows, Mac OS X; WW: December 17, 2013 PlayStation 3; NA: December 17, 2013; EU: December 18, 2013 Xbox 360, iOS; WW: December 18, 2013 PlayStation Vita; WW: April 22, 2014; Episode 2: Windows, Mac OS X; WW: March 4, 2014 PlayStation 3; NA: March 4, 2014; EU: March 12, 2014 Xbox 360; WW: March 5, 2014 iOS; WW: March 6, 2014 PlayStation Vita; WW: April 22, 2014; Episode 3: Windows, Mac OS X; WW: May 13, 2014 PlayStation 3; NA: May 13, 2014; EU: May 14, 2014 Xbox 360; WW: May 14, 2014 iOS; WW: May 15, 2014; Episode 4: Windows, Mac OS X; WW: July 22, 2014 PlayStation 3; NA: July 22, 2014; EU: July 23, 2014 Xbox 360; WW: July 23, 2014 iOS; WW: July 24, 2014; Episode 5: Windows, Mac OS X; WW: August 26, 2014 PlayStation 3; NA: August 26, 2014; EU: August 27, 2014 Xbox 360; WW: August 27, 2014 iOS; WW: August 28, 2014; Retail version: Mac OS X, Windows, PlayStation 3 & Xbox 360; NA: October 14, 2014; AU: October 31, 2014; EU: October 24, 2014 PlayStation Vita; WW: November 4, 2014 PlayStation 4, Xbox One; NA: October 21, 2014; EU: October 31, 2014 Nintendo Switch; WW: January 21, 2020
- Genres: Graphic adventure; Interactive movie
- Mode: Single-player

The Walking Dead: Season Two (Note: Also known as TWD S2 on mobile platforms) is a 2013 episodic graphic adventure video game developed by Telltale Games based on the comic book series of the same name. It is the sequel to The Walking Dead, with five episodes released between December 2013 and August 2014. A retail collector's disc edition was released after the conclusion of the season. The game employs the same narrative structure as the first season, where player choice in one episode will have a permanent impact on future story elements. The player choices recorded in save files from the first season and the additional episode 400 Days carry over into the second season. Clementine, who was the player's main companion during the first season, returns as the main protagonist of Season Two.

The Walking Dead: Season Two overall received generally positive reviews from critics; with particular praise going to the atmosphere, protagonist, and its sense of tension; however, its lack of hub areas, lack of impactful choices, and certain aspects of its storytelling received a mixed response. Many felt it was inferior to its predecessor. A third season, titled The Walking Dead: A New Frontier, was episodically released from December 2016 to May 2017.

== Gameplay ==
Similar to the previous season, The Walking Dead: Season Two is a point-and-click adventure game. The player, in control of Clementine, can direct the character around the environment, examine and interact with various scenery elements and collect and use objects to advance the story. The player can also initiate conversations with non-player characters via conversation trees. Certain replies from other characters may offer the player multiple choices to select from, including the option to stay silent, with a limited amount of time to make the selection; if the player does not select an option, the conversation will continue as if they had stayed quiet. Such choices can affect how the other characters will later react to Clementine, which can influence later events in the story. Other scenes are more action-oriented, requiring the player to complete quick time events to prevent Clementine or her allies from getting killed. If the player fails at these events, the game will restart at the start of the scene. Such action scenes may also require the player to make a key decision within a limited time frame, such as which of two characters to save from attacking walkers.

The player's choices and actions will impact story elements in later episodes; for example, a character that the player does not choose to save will not appear in later scenes. Season Two also incorporates the player's choices from the first season and the DLC 400 Days, via the saved game file from these games, to influence the story and events in these episodes.

== Synopsis ==
=== Setting and characters ===
The Walking Dead: Season Two follows on the first game, and coincides with events of the comic, in which a zombie apocalypse has occurred, turning humans that are bitten or die into zombies, or "walkers"; the only way to stop this conversion is to damage the brain. The game is mostly set more than a year following its predecessor. While the game starts in Georgia, the setting moves to more northern locales as the survivors head towards Michigan, believing there is a large survivor camp there.

The second season follows Clementine (Melissa Hutchison), a young girl who has been able to survive the walkers thanks to the help of Lee Everett (Dave Fennoy). At the start of the apocalypse, Lee helps to protect Clementine and offers to help her find her parents who had gone to Savannah; they join several survivors in their journey. When Clementine is captured, a bitten Lee rescues her, but both realize her parents have become walkers. She is forced to choose between shooting him or leaving him to reanimate, before venturing off on her own.

The second season features several new characters, as well as others returning from the first season. Clementine initially accompanies Omid (Owen Thomas) and Christa (Mara Junot), a couple who are the last known survivors of Clementine's previous group. She then encounters a cabin that shelters several survivors: Luke (Scott Porter), a survivalist who quickly befriends Clementine; Luke's friend Nick (Brian Bremer), and his uncle Pete (Brian Sommer), a hunter; doctor Carlos (Kid Beyond), who is protective over his teenage daughter Sarah (Louisa Mackintosh); and Alvin (Dorian Lockett) and his wife Rebecca (Shay Moore), who are expecting a child. The cabin group has fled from William Carver (Michael Madsen), a charismatic yet dangerous dictator who rules a large survivor group in Howe's Hardware. They later encounter another group of survivors, consisting of Kenny (Gavin Hammon), Clementine's friend who was believed to be killed by walkers; Sarita (Julia Farmer), Kenny's new girlfriend; and Kenny's friend, Walter (Kiff VandenHeuvel) and, Matthew (Wylie Herman). Both factions encounter Carver and his men, whose community includes Bonnie (Erin Yvette) and other survivors that were previously introduced in the 400 Days add-on content from the first season; Jane (Christine Lakin), a lone wolf who had lost her sister to walkers; and Mike (Dan White), a cranky yet humorous survivor. The latter part of the season introduces Arvo (Michael Ark), a Russian teenager with a leg brace who speaks in broken English, later shown to be part of a larger group of other Russian survivors.

== Plot ==
This is only a broad overview of the plot, and may differ based on the choices made during both this game and the preceding season and its add-on, 400 Days.

After the events of the first game, Clementine regroups with Omid and Christa, but Omid is killed at a rest stop. Sixteen months later, Christa and 11-year-old Clementine are planning to travel to Wellington, Ohio but are separated when scavengers attack. After being saved from walkers, Clementine joins a new group consisting of Luke, Pete, his nephew Nick, Alvin, his pregnant wife Rebecca, Carlos, and his daughter Sarah.

After Pete is killed by walkers, Clementine encounters a man named William Carver, the possible father of Rebecca's child, who is hunting down the group. Forced to abandon their cabin, the survivors find a ski lodge occupied by Clementine's old acquaintance Kenny, his girlfriend Sarita, and their friend Walter. Walkers attack the lodge, during which Nick is potentially killed. They are saved by the arrival of an armed group commanded by Carver. Carver executes Walter and possibly Alvin too, depending on Clementine's actions. Regardless, Carver's group captures everyone except Luke.

Carver takes them to Howe's Hardware, a fortified mall that he tyrannically runs. Luke sneaks in Howe's and warns the others of an oncoming walker horde. The group, joined by two other survivors, Jane and Mike, and one of Carver's minions, Bonnie, devise a plan to escape by drawing the horde to the mall. During the chaos, Alvin (if alive) is killed by one of Carver's men, while Kenny kneecaps and brutally kills Carver in revenge for an earlier injury that had cost Kenny his left eye. The group makes their way through the walker horde by covering themselves in walker guts, but Carlos and Sarita are killed.

Everyone gathers at the nearby ruins of a museum. Clementine and Jane set out to find Sarah, Luke, and Nick (if alive), who were separated amidst the horde. Clementine and Jane's search leads to a trailer park where Nick (if alive) has reanimated and Luke and Sarah are trapped by walkers. With Sarah catatonic due to her father's death, Clementine can either coerce her to leave with them or abandon her to be devoured. As Rebecca goes into labor, the survivors retreat to the museum's observation deck, which collapses and causes Sarah (if saved before) to fall and get killed. Rebecca gives birth to a boy whom Kenny names Alvin Jr., "AJ". Jane leaves the group out of fear of getting attached to Clementine. As the group heads north, they are ambushed by Russian survivors. When Rebecca dies of exhaustion and blood loss and turns, either Clementine or Kenny kills her to protect AJ, which starts a gunfight.

Amidst the gunfight, Jane returns to save the others. Arvo, the sole Russian survivor, is left alive on the promise of supplies. He directs the group to a home across a frozen lake, but the ice breaks and Luke and potentially Bonnie fall through and drown. Kenny brutalizes Arvo, blaming him for Luke's death, which horrifies the others. They find a truck, planning to use it to leave the next morning. However, Clementine catches Arvo, Bonnie (if alive), and Mike attempting to escape from Kenny with the supplies, afraid of his increasing rage. Clementine is shot by Arvo and passes out. She awakens in the truck with Jane, Kenny, and AJ as they are heading north, the others having run off. The road is blocked amid a blinding blizzard and Kenny leaves to look for gas to siphon. Fed up with Kenny, Jane tries to convince Clementine to abandon him with her, but the two are separated by walkers. Clementine regroups with Kenny, but Jane then arrives without AJ, and it is implied she had to leave him behind. As an enraged Kenny fights and overpowers Jane, Clementine must decide whether to shoot Kenny to save Jane or allow Kenny to kill her.

If Clementine kills Kenny, she then learns that Jane hid AJ and faked his death to manipulate Clementine into believing Kenny was unstable. Thereafter, Clementine can either forgive Jane and return to Howe's with her or refuse and set off alone with AJ. If Clementine instead allows Kenny to kill Jane, she then has the option of either killing or abandoning Kenny and leaving with AJ or forgiving Kenny and staying with him. If they stay together, the two eventually find Wellington, but the community's overpopulation forces Clementine to decide whether to enter with AJ and leave Kenny or stay with him.

== Episodes ==
The game is separated into five episodes, like the first season.

No. overall	No. in season	Title	Directed by	Written by	Original release date
7	1	"All That Remains"	Dennis Lenart	Nick Breckon; Andrew Grant	December 17, 2013
With the loss of Lee Everett and almost everyone else she could call a friend bearing down on her mind, Clementine continues to make the best of a life that gives new meaning to pain.
8	2	"A House Divided"	Eric Parsons	Nick Breckon	March 4, 2014
After gaining new friends and enemies, Clementine has found her way into the lives of more survivors. Now, she fights for her life against both the dead and the living.
9	3	"In Harm's Way"	Graham Ross	Pierre Shorette	May 13, 2014
After reuniting with her old friend Kenny, Clementine is now prisoner to a man with the intention of preparing mankind's next generation for survival, through any means necessary.
10	4	"Amid the Ruins"	Jason Latino	J. T. Petty; Eric Stirpe	July 22, 2014
With the group scattered amidst a swarm of undead monsters, and an imminent birth on the way, Clementine's only goal is finding her friends and keeping them safe.
11	5	"No Going Back"	Sean Ainsworth; Dennis Lenart	Nick Breckon; Pierre Shorette	August 26, 2014
The birth of Rebecca's son and subsequent death of the baby's mother has started a new battle for survival which promises to not end quietly. Through the harshest weather she has seen thus far, can Clementine protect the group's newest member and keep everyone she cares about alive?

== Development ==
When Telltale Games acquired the right to make video games based on The Walking Dead comics, they signed a contract for a "multi-year, multi-platform, multi-title" license. This license went into effect after the success of the first season of The Walking Dead, when Telltale commissioned a second series of games based on the franchise. The first season was considered highly successful, helping to revitalize the adventure game genre, which had been in decline since the mid-1990s, with Telltale being recognized as one of the top development studios in 2012.

During an interview on IGN's Up at Noon, writer Gary Whitta teased that more The Walking Dead from Telltale was coming sooner than later. Whitta continued to hint that something was in the works that would make the wait for Season Two "slightly less agonizing". This was revealed at E3 2013 to be an additional episode titled The Walking Dead: 400 Days, which would be released as downloadable content for the first season. It introduced five new characters, and decisions made in 400 Days would carry into Season Two.

=== Writing ===
Writing for Season Two was done to contrast the work Telltale had completed in the first season. At the start of the writing cycle for the second season, they had debated who their primary character would be including introducing new group of survivors that they could use to flesh out the backstories of characters from the first season, or with a new "protector" for Clementine. They eventually agreed to use Clementine as the main character as they felt her story needed to be continued. By changing the player's perspective from that of Lee to Clementine, they wanted to create a "different sort of agency" that the player will experience. Instead of the player, as Lee, looking to help Clementine and others, the player as Clementine would now have to determine whom to trust to help her. They also emphasize this new perspective by using several camera angles from a low perspective, to emphasize that Clementine is a child compared to others she meets. The developers also recognized that they needed to avoid making Clementine feel like a "carbon copy" of the character from the first season and instead something crafted by the player's decisions. To resolve this they created the first scenario of the game that would separate her from the familiar characters and to make it feel a result of the player's actions, so that the player would directly connect with Clementine's situation. The concept they kept in mind while writing for Season Two was "[Clementine is] eleven years old and the world doesn't care."

=== Release ===
As with the previous season, Telltale released Season Two for Windows and OS X computers, and for PlayStation 3, Xbox 360, PlayStation Vita, and iOS devices. Releases for the PlayStation 4 and Xbox One consoles were announced in May 2014 with release at a later date, along with retail versions of the game for the PlayStation 3 and Xbox 360 consoles. A Nintendo Switch version was released in 2020.

The season was formally announced in late October 2013. The announcement showcased Clementine as the playable character for the game, set sometime after the events of the first series. Telltale's CEO Dan Conners stated that this would put "players in the shoes of a lead role that will challenge their expectations of how to survive in a world where no one can be trusted". The first episode was released in the fourth quarter of 2013, with subsequent episodes released four to six weeks apart. A collector's disc was announced to purchase at the end of the season, with those who pre-order the game (from the Telltale Games Store) receiving it for just the shipping and handling cost.

A Wii U version was in the works, bundling both Season 1's Game of the Year (GOTY) Edition and Season 2. The bundle was listed by the game retailer GAME in the UK with a placeholder release date of October 30, 2015, but it ended up being cancelled. This was due to declining Wii U console sales and the fact that porting the Telltale Tool engine onto the hardware—specifically optimizing it for dual-screen functionality utilizing both the TV output and the Wii U GamePad—proved highly complex.

=== Soundtrack ===
On September 10, 2019, an official soundtrack album of Jared Emerson-Johnson's B.A.F.T.A. Award nominated score to the game was released for digital download and on streaming services, with a special edition set of vinyl LPs due to release shortly thereafter.

== Spin-off and sequel ==
Telltale Games and Skybound Entertainment released spin-off mini-series The Walking Dead: Michonne in February 2016. A third season titled The Walking Dead: A New Frontier was released with its first two episodes in December 2016, and a physical season pass in February 2017.

== Reception ==
Aggregate review scores
Game	GameRankings	Metacritic
Episode 1 – All That Remains	(PS3) 81.29% (PC) 78.76% (X360) 77.50%	(PS3) 84 (X360) 80 (PC) 75
Episode 2 – A House Divided	(PS3) 87.29% (PC) 81.39% (X360) 79.44%	(PS3) 82 (PC) 81 (X360) 80
Episode 3 – In Harm's Way	(PS3) 82.43% (X360) 82.25% (PC) 82.22%	(X360) 82 (PC) 81 (PS3) 80
Episode 4 – Amid the Ruins	(PS3) 79.22% (PC) 78.58% (X360) 72.00%	(PS3) 78 (PC) 78 (X360) 71
Episode 5 – No Going Back	(PS3) 81.67% (PC) 79.19% (X360) 77.00%	(PS3) 91 (X360) 84 (PC) 78
A Telltale Games Series	(PS3) 86.00% (PC) 80.11% (PS4) 82.50% (PSVITA) 82.00% (iOS) 60.00%	(PS4) 81 (PC) 80

The Walking Dead: Season Two overall received generally positive reviews from critics; with particular praise going to the atmosphere, protagonist, and its sense of tension; however, its lack of hub areas, lack of impactful choices, and certain aspects of its storytelling were criticized.

=== Episode 1 – All That Remains ===
Episode 1 – All That Remains received positive reviews. Aggregating review websites GameRankings and Metacritic gave the PlayStation 3 version 81.29% and 82/100, the PC version 78.76% and 78/100 and the Xbox 360 version 77.50% and 80/100. Matt Liebl from GameZone gave the episode an 8.5/10, stating that it "...is just a taste of what's to come -- a mere setup for the horror that awaits us in the final four episodes."

=== Episode 2 – A House Divided ===
Episode 2 - A House Divided received positive reviews. Aggregating review websites GameRankings and Metacritic gave the PlayStation 3 version 87.29% and 82/100, the PC version 81.39% and 81/100 and the Xbox 360 version 79.44% and 80/100. Mitch Dyer from IGN gave the episode a 9.5/10, saying it is one of the best episodes Telltale Games has ever made.

=== Episode 3 – In Harm's Way ===
Episode 3 - In Harm's Way received positive reviews. Aggregating review websites GameRankings and Metacritic gave the PlayStation 3 version 82.43% and 80/100, the Xbox 360 version 82.25% and 82/100 and the PC version 82.22% and 81/100.

=== Episode 4 – Amid the Ruins ===
Episode 4 - Amid the Ruins received mixed to positive reviews. Aggregating review websites GameRankings and Metacritic gave the PlayStation 3 version 79.22% and 78/100, the PC version 78.58% and 78/100 and the Xbox 360 version 72.00% and 71/100. Many critics praised Clementine's development while most criticisms were focused on some of the characters' cheap deaths and sub-par writing compared to the episode's predecessors.

=== Episode 5 – No Going Back ===
Episode 5 – No Going Back received positive reviews, higher than its predecessor. Aggregating review websites GameRankings and Metacritic gave the PlayStation 3 version 81.67% and 87/100, the PC version 79.19% and 78/100 and the Xbox 360 version 77.00% and 84/100. Mitch Dyer of IGN gave the episode a 9.5/10 saying that the finale is "an impressive and intelligent episode, and among Telltale Games' finest stories."
