= Melissa Hutchison =

American voice actress

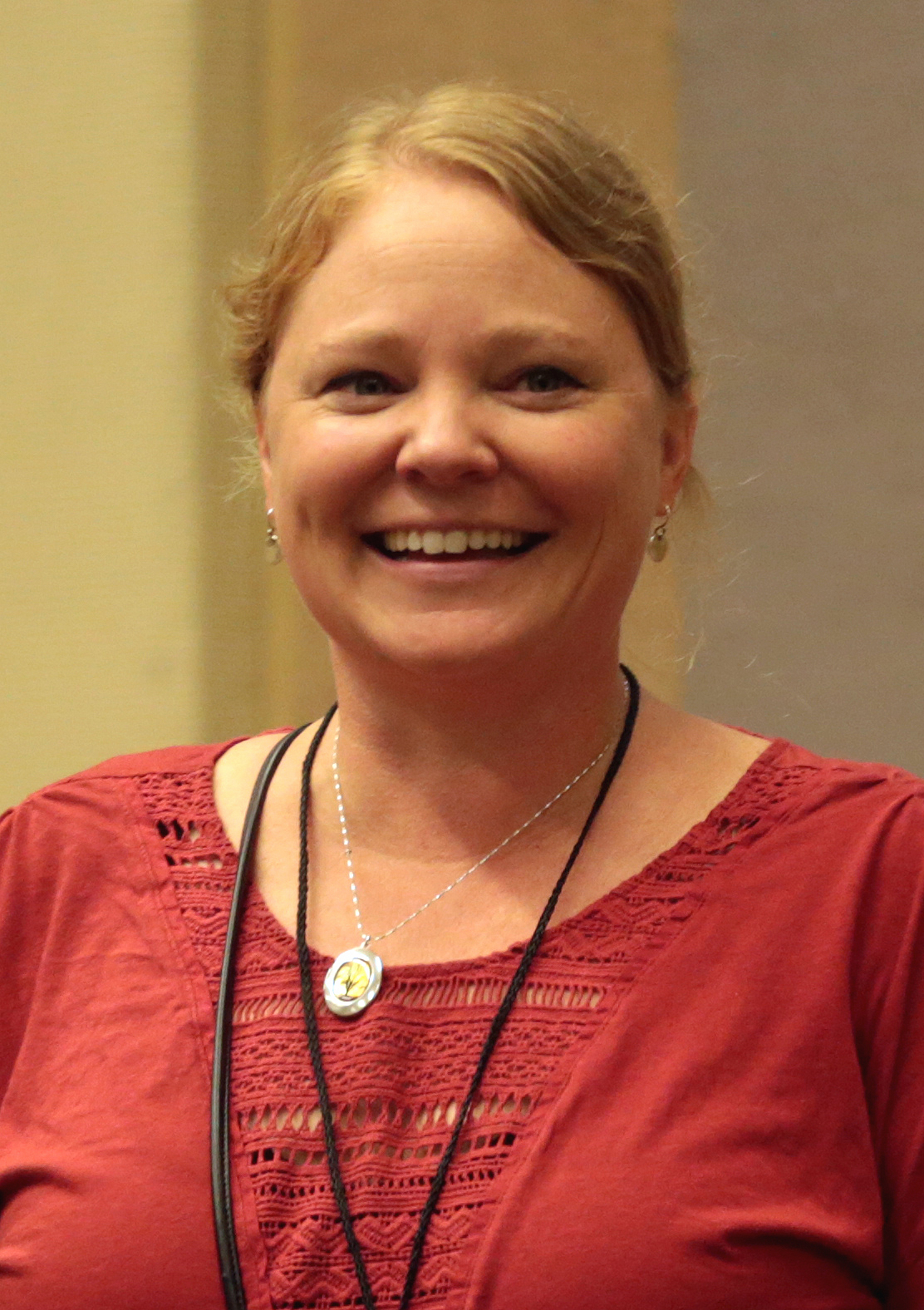
- Hutchison at the 2017 Phoenix Fan Fusion
- Occupation: Voice actress
- Years active: 2002–present
- Website: melissahutchison.com

Melissa Hutchison is an American voice actress, who is well known for her voice role as Clementine in The Walking Dead and its sequels, for which she won Best Performance by a Female at the 2013 Spike Video Game Awards and was nominated for the 2014 NAVGTR Award Performance in a Drama, Lead respectively. She has also been nominated twice for a BAFTA Award for Best Performer.

== Filmography ==
=== Television ===
Year	Series	Role	Notes	Source
2002	Saikano	Chise	English dub (13 episodes)	
2014–2018	Space Racers	AVA, Starling, Curiosity	Voice (44 episodes)	
2015	Portlandia		Episode: "Fashion"	
2015–2018	Yo-kai Watch	Katie Forester, Komasan, Snottle	English dub (29 episodes)	
2019	Sailor Moon Sailor Stars	Sailor Star Fighter / Seiya Kou	English dub	
2019	Cannon Busters	Jojo, additional voices	English dub	
2023	Pluto	Dr. Roosevelt	English dub	
2025	Mickey Mouse Funhouse	Huey, Dewey, and Louie	Episode: "Sitting Ducks"	

=== Film ===
Year	Film	Role	Notes	Source
2014	Yo-kai Watch: The Movie	Katie Forester, Komasan, Cadin, Kin, Kyubi, Tattletell, Walkappa	English dub	
2015	Guardians of Oz	Gabby	English dub	
2016	Rudolph the Red-Nosed Reindeer 4D Attraction	Rudolph	Voice, short film	

=== Video games ===
Year	Title	Voice role	Notes
2003	Cyber Troopers Virtual-On Marz	Operator, L'Ln Plajiner	
2004	Dance Dance Revolution Ultramix 2	Announcer	
2005	Light Rangers: Mending the Maniac Madness	Amos	
2006	MechAssault: Phantom War	Vallen	
2006	Phantasy Star Universe	Liina	
2006	Death Jr. II: Root of Evil	Pandora	
2007	Shining Force EXA	Maebelle, Amitaliri	
2007	Raw Danger!	Stephanie McMurrough	
2007	Kane & Lynch: Dead Men	Jenny	
2007–2008	Sam & Max Beyond Time and Space	Stinky	2021 remaster
2008	Phantasy Star Portable	Liina Sukaya, Kalaam Ryme	
2008	Chronicles of Mystery: The Scorpio Ritual	Sylvie Leroux	
2008	A Vampyre Story	Pyewacket	
2009	League of Legends	Ashe	
2009	Nick Chase: A Detective Story	Mary Ann Smith	
2010	Puzzle Agent	Glori Davner	
2010	Chronicles of Mystery: The Tree of Life	Sylvie Leroux	
2010	Deadly Premonition	Anna Graham, Sallie Graham	
2010	Sam & Max: The Devil's Playhouse	Stinky, Computer, Rat, Statue of Liberty	
2010	Nelson Tethers: Puzzle Agent	Glori Davner	
2010	Bakugan: Defenders of the Core	Marucho Marukura	
2011	Back to the Future: The Game	Trixie Trotter	
2011	BackStab HD	Emma Quincy	
2011	Grotesque Tactics 2: Dungeons & Donuts	Lola, Gardinia	
2012	The Walking Dead	Clementine	
2013–2014	The Wolf Among Us	Toad Junior, Beauty	
2013–2014	The Walking Dead: Season Two	Clementine	
2015	Action Henk	Betsy	
2015	Lego Dimensions	Michael "Mikey" Walsh	
2016	Minecraft: Story Mode	Isa	
2016–2017	The Walking Dead: A New Frontier	Clementine	
2017	2064: Read Only Memories	Turing	
2017	Marvel vs. Capcom: Infinite	Monster Hunter	
2018	Sushi Striker: The Way of Sushido	Archie	
2018	Where the Water Tastes Like Wine	Quinn	
2018	Spyro Reignited Trilogy	Bianca	
2018	Last Year: The Nightmare	Samantha	
2018–2019	The Walking Dead: The Final Season	Clementine	
2018-2023	WarioWare	9-Volt (since WarioWare Gold)	
2019	Yo-kai Watch 3	Usapyon, Komasan, Hidabat, Katie Forrester	English dub
2020	The Last of Us Part II	Additional voices	
2020	Minecraft Dungeons	Additional voices	
2022	Relayer	Additional voices	
2022	Fire Emblem Warriors: Three Hopes	Arval, Epimenides	
2023	Fire Emblem Engage	Panette	
2023	Trinity Trigger	Elise Quois	
2024	Cookie Run: Witch's Castle	GingerDozer	
2025	Story of Seasons: Grand Bazaar	Kevin	
2026	Code Vein II	Lycoris, Monica Asturias	
