= Raymond Ochoa =

American actor (born 2001)

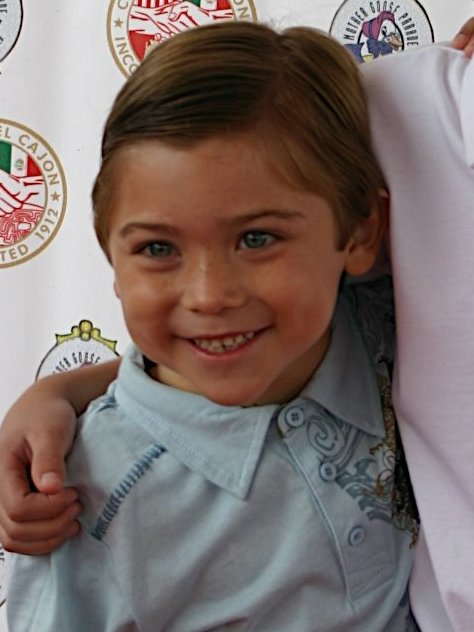
- Ochoa on the red carpet at the 62nd Annual Mother Goose Parade in 2008
- Born: October 12, 2001 (age 25); San Diego, California, U.S.
- Occupation: Actor
- Years active: 2006–present
- Partner: Cecilia Ramirez (2020–present)
- Children: 1
- Relatives: Ryan Ochoa (brother)
- Musical career
- Genres: Hip-hop, teen pop
- Instrument: Vocals
- Member of: Ochoa Boyz

Raymond Ochoa (born October 12, 2001) is an American actor. He is best known as Arlo in The Good Dinosaur (2015).

== Early life ==
Ochoa was born on October 12, 2001, in San Diego, California. He is the younger brother of actors Ryan, Rick, and Robert Ochoa, and is of Mexican, Filipino, Italian, Irish and Russian-Jewish descent.

== Career ==
=== Acting career ===
He has appeared in various commercials, television shows and films including roles in 10 Items or Less, Merry Christmas, Drake & Josh, and the lead character, Arlo, in the Pixar film The Good Dinosaur. He has also made a number of video game appearances with his most recognizable being Gabriel Garcia in The Walking Dead: A New Frontier.

In 2007, he starred in commercials for Betty Crocker, Verizon FiOS, and Chevrolet. He made his debut by playing Manuelito, a minor role in the television series 10 Items or Less in 2006. He appeared in the television series Cold Case, and Hank.

=== Musical career ===
Ochoa is in the band Ochoa Boyz, formed by him and his three brothers Ryan, Robert, and Rick since 2012.

== Personal life ==
Ochoa has been in a relationship with Cecilia Ramirez since March 2020. Together they have one son who was born on November 27, 2021.

== Filmography ==
=== Film ===
Year	Title	Role	Notes
2009	A Christmas Carol	Caroline's Child	Voice and motion capture
2010	House Under Siege	Toby Michael Mazur	
2010	Yogi Bear	Additional Voice-Over	Live-action/animated film
2011	Mars Needs Moms	Hatchling	Voice and motion capture
2011	Einstein Pals	Joey	Status unknown/not released
2011	Kung Fu Panda 2	Additional Voices/ADR Group	
2013	Monsters University	Additional Children Voices	
2013	Charlie A Toy Story	Caden	
2013	Lovesick	Shane	
2014	Mr. Peabody & Sherman	Additional Voices/ADR Group	
2015	The Good Dinosaur	Arlo	Voice

=== Television ===
Year	Title	Role	Notes
2006–2009	10 Items or Less	Manuelito	3 episodes
2007	Cold Case	Sean	Episode: "Blood on the Tracks"
2007	American Family	Will Bogner	Unaired television series
2008	Merry Christmas, Drake & Josh	Boy	Television film
2009	Hank	Kyle	4 episodes
2010	Special Agent Oso	Noah	Voice, episode: "The Living Holiday Lights"
2010	Robot Chicken: Star Wars Episode III	Young Anakin Skywalker	Voice, television special
2010, 2012	Pair of Kings	Young Boy / Young Lanny	3 episodes
2011	The Middle	Danny	Episode: "Valentines Day II"
2011	Good Luck Charlie	Augie	Episode: "Something's Fishy"
2011	Private Practice	Ollie	Episode: "If I Hadn't Forgotten"
2011	Working Class	Kid	Episode: "B-Day Invasion"
2014	I Didn't Do It	Zane	Episode: "Phone Challenge"
2015	Rizzoli & Isles	Logan Reynolds	Episode: "In Plain View"
2020	The Big Show Show	Greg Turbow	Episode: "The Big Process"

=== Video games ===
Year	Title	Role
2011	Kinect Disneyland Adventures	Squirt
2012	Kinect Rush: A Disney-Pixar Adventure	Dash Parr
2013	Disney Infinity	Dash Parr
2014	Disney Infinity: Marvel Super Heroes	Dash Parr
2014	Sunset Overdrive	Additional Voices
2015	Disney Infinity 3.0	Dash Parr / Arlo
2015	Fallout 4	Male Brotherhood of Steel Squire
2016	The Walking Dead: A New Frontier	Gabriel Garcia
