= Ballard (TV series) =

2025 American police procedural series

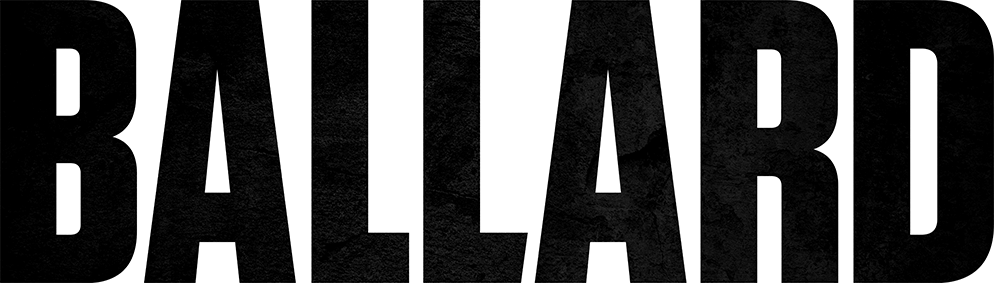
- Also known as: Bosch: Ballard
- Genre: Crime drama; Police procedural
- Based on: Renée Ballard series by Michael Connelly
- Developed by: Michael Alaimo; Kendall Sherwood
- Showrunners: Michael Alaimo; Kendall Sherwood
- Starring: Maggie Q; Courtney Taylor; Michael Mosley; Rebecca Field; Victoria Moroles; Amy Hill; John Carroll Lynch
- Country of origin: United States
- Original language: English
- No. of seasons: 1
- No. of episodes: 10

Production
- Executive producers: Michael Connelly; Henrik Bastin; Michael Alaimo; Kendall Sherwood; Trish Hofmann; Jet Wilkinson; Melissa Aouate
- Production companies: Hieronymus Pictures; Fabel Entertainment; Alaimo Productions; Bitter Root Productions; Amazon MGM Studios

Original release
- Network: Amazon Prime Video
- Release: July 9, 2025 – present

Related
- Bosch; Bosch: Legacy

Ballard is an American police procedural television series created by Michael Alaimo and Kendall Sherwood, based on the Renée Ballard novel series by Michael Connelly, who is credited as co-creator and executive producer. A spinoff of Bosch (2014–21) and Bosch: Legacy (2022–25), the show premiered on July 9, 2025, on Amazon Prime Video. It stars Maggie Q as LAPD detective Renée Ballard. In October 2025, the series was renewed for a second season.

== Premise ==
Set in Los Angeles, Ballard follows Detective Renée Ballard as she takes command of the LAPD's newly formed cold case unit of the Robbery-Homicide Division (RHD). Staffed primarily by volunteers and under-resourced, the unit is tasked with solving decades-old homicides. As Ballard reopens long-dormant investigations, she uncovers a web of corruption and cover-ups that reach deep into the police department itself. The series blends episodic cold-case mysteries with a season-long serialized arc involving a mysterious conspiracy.

== Cast and characters ==
=== Main ===
- Maggie Q as Renée Ballard, a determined, empathetic LAPD detective leading the cold-case unit
- Courtney Taylor as Samira Parker, a former LAPD officer who is recruited by Ballard to join the Cold Case Unit, driven by her determination to uncover the truth after feeling overlooked in her previous job
- Michael Mosley as Ted Rawls (season 1), a reserve officer assigned to oversee Ballard's work on cold cases
- Rebecca Field as Colleen Hatteras, an enthusiastic volunteer
- Victoria Moroles as Martina Castro, a legal intern
- Amy Hill as Tutu, Ballard's grandmother
- John Carroll Lynch as Thomas Laffont, a retired former police partner who returns to assist Ballard in running the cold-case unit. A seasoned detective and skilled interrogator, Laffont serves as a steady, supportive presence in Ballard's life.

=== Recurring ===
- Noah Bean as Jake Pearlman, a shrewd yet well-meaning Los Angeles councilman who takes bold steps to support the Cold Case Unit in hopes of solving his sister's murder.
- Michael Cassidy as Aaron, a lifeguard who has an off-again on-again romantic relationship with Ballard.
- Ricardo Chavira as Robert Olivas, a respected, charming, and charismatic detective with a history of assaulting strong women he worked with, such as Ballard or Parker.
- Alain Uy as Nelson Hastings, a shrewd and ambitious political figure. A longtime friend of Jake Pearlman who is willing to go to any lengths to support him.
- Hector Hugo as Berchem, a Robbery-Homicide captain and a "cop's cop" who took a chance on Ballard. He is deeply committed to justice and cares fiercely about the integrity of his team.
- Brian Letcher as Ken Chastain, Ballard's former partner.
- Kevin Dunn as Gary Pearlman, Jake Pearlman's father.
- Colin McCalla as Manny Santos, a police officer who begins dating Martina.
- Brendan Sexton III as Anthony Driscoll, a former police officer affiliated with Manny Santos.
- Jim Rash as Leo, Thomas Laffont's boyfriend.
- Cat Novella as Claudia, a hairdresser who is friendly with undocumented workers in a cold case.
- Sharif Atkins as Damani, a defense lawyer who comes into contact with Ballard during her casework.
- Gabriella Bonet as Abril Cortes, the girlfriend of a murder victim the cold case unit investigates.
- Alexandra Barreto as Janet Olivas
- Rosanna Arquette as Jenny Ballard (season 2), Renée Ballard's estranged mother
- Benjamin Bratt as Ryan Ainsley (season 2)
- Ever Carradine as Lauren Sousa (season 2)
- Hamish Linklater as Chris Alexander (season 2)

=== Special guest stars ===
- Titus Welliver as Harry Bosch, a retired LAPD detective and private investigator, reprising his role from Bosch and Bosch: Legacy.
- Troy Evans as Barrel, a retired LAPD detective, reprising his role from Bosch and Bosch: Legacy.
- Gregory Scott Cummins as Crate, a retired LAPD detective, reprising his role from Bosch and Bosch: Legacy.
- Jamie Hector as Jerry Edgar, an RHD detective, reprising his role from Bosch and Bosch: Legacy.
- Stephen Chang as Maurice "Mo" Bassi, Harry Bosch's technology expert reprising his role from Bosch: Legacy.
- Mimi Rogers as Los Angeles County District Attorney Honey "Money" Chandler reprising her role from Bosch and Bosch: Legacy.

== Episodes ==
No.	Title	Directed by	Written by	Original release date
1	"Library of Lost Souls"	Jet Wilkinson	Michael Alaimo & Kendall Sherwood	July 9, 2025
The episode begins, at night, with Detective Renée Ballard and her partner, Thomas Laffont, pursuing a suspect. Ballard chases the suspect into a dry cleaners where the suspect opens fire at her, forcing her to shoot back. Ballard is able to catch and arrest him just before Laffont arrives. The next day, her partner tells her OIS asked questions in his interview on the shooting that suggest they want her fired. At work that day, she reviews a John Doe case and is accosted by councilman Jake Pearlman for not making progress investigating the murder of his sister, Sarah Pearlman. In the John Doe case Ballard reaches out to the detective, Samira Parker, who initially investigated it. Parker tells her that the LAPD covered up an altercation at the motel where the victim was last seen alive. Ballard invites the detective to join her unit as a volunteer, and she does, showing up at the office the next day and meeting the other members of the task force, reserve officer Ted Rawls, law student Martina Castro, volunteer and stay-at-home mom Colleen Hatteras, and Laffont. The team is given a piece of evidence from the councilman's sister's case, which Ballard has tested for DNA. Afterward, she returns home to her grandmother and discusses her personal problems, including an incident which occurred the previous year. The next day, Parker reinvestigates the motel but finds nothing, and RHD is informed about this. At work, Ballard finds the eccentricities of Hatteras may interfere with the case, and Parker tells her she doesn't want to continue investigating. Shortly after, Ballard is informed that DNA was found on a handprint at the scene of Sarah Pearlman's murder. Ballard then attempts to procure the DNA of the main suspect in the case, Brian Richmond, Sarah's ex-boyfriend, but fails. Detective Olivas from RHD (who has history with Ballard) arrives to speak with Parker who was his former partner. He tells them that a woman had called RHD asking for Samira but hung up when he told her Samira no longer worked there. Olivas goes as far as offer to help out with the case. Ballard turns him down and reprimands him, insisting that Olivas call instead next time. Later, Ballard tries to get Parker to permanently join her unit, admitting she was assigned to cold cases after being harassed by Olivas and calling him out. She persuades Parker to join by revealing that she decided to take the John Doe case because Olivas couldn't solve it. The next day, Parker arrives at the motel and finds a cleaning woman there was killed. Ballard, meanwhile, is informed that the DNA from the scene of Sarah Pearlman's murder was a match to DNA found in another cold case, the murder of Laura Wilson in 2008. When Ballard checks the murder book of that case, she finds it was investigated by Harry Bosch.
2	"Haystacks"	Jet Wilkinson	Michael Alaimo & Kendall Sherwood	July 9, 2025
Ballard, while investigating the murder of the cleaning woman, finds she was already in the room when the shooter came in and discreetly gets a picture of the suspect, and she and Parker discover the woman may have been killed for talking to Parker about the John Doe case. She tells Laffont to look into the victim and hold back on informing Bosch, and finds out the suspect is a homeless man. She has Rawls try to find him, and goes to talk to Laura Wilson's mother. On the way, she is accosted by Pearlman, who she tells about the connection, and finds the ex-boyfriend couldn't have killed Wilson if the murder was in 2008. When she goes to speak to Laura's mother, she is followed discreetly by a truck. After getting nothing, she speaks to a therapist about shooting the suspect, who suggests running cold cases is her way of dealing with the trauma of being abandoned by the police, and runs into Olivas and a few of his friends when she leaves. Martina suggests Laura and the councilman's sister may have met through acting, and Laffont confirms Richmond's alibi. Finding the detective investigating the cleaning woman's murder wasn't at the autopsy, Ballard has Laffont retrieve the bullet, and Hatteras is disturbed by the body. Rawls and Parker, canvassing the homeless, find a blanket from the motel, which leads them to an address for the suspect, while Ballard is rejected by Richmond. Investigating the address, they arrest the suspect. Ballard spends the night with Aaron, a lifeguard, but is gone by the time he wakes up and meets her grandmother. At work, Ballard is officially given the case of the cleaning woman, and meets Parker at the hospital to interrogate the suspect, again followed by the truck. Mentally ill, the suspect seemingly confesses to having been paid to murder the cleaner but is vague about the location of the gun he used. At the office, Bosch arrives and reprimands Ballard over talking to Laura's mother and is informed about the DNA. At lunch, they discuss the way Ballard's career has gone and decide on how to proceed with the Wilson case, while Rawls and Parker find the gun. The gun is confirmed to be the murder weapon in the case of the cleaning woman, but the bullet in the John Doe case is found to be missing, and Parker realizes the murder was covered up. A man shown to have been driving the truck following Ballard tells someone on the phone that the case of the cleaner is closed, and is shortly afterward revealed to be a cop.
3	"BYOB"	Patrick Cady	Thania St. John	July 9, 2025
Ballard's grandmother tries to get her to open up by building a surfboard, but she refuses and goes to meet the captain. Laffont tells her the suspect in the Wilson case is deceased, and tries to confirm his alibi. Ballard is assigned another cold case, a dead fraternity brother which has recently attracted interest due to social media. After finding they have a new case, Hatteras confesses she wants to give closure to the cleaning woman's family. Ballard speaks to the victim's sister and finds he was in an altercation before his death, as well as injuries not consistent with an accident. Parker reveals to Ballard that the bullet in the John Doe case was destroyed, and she demands Parker get her badge back to have more authority within the police. Ballard and Laffont investigate victim's fraternity brothers, with Ballard ignoring calls from Ken Chastain, her former partner, and they find the fraternity is hiding something. Bringing Rawls, Ballard talks to them again, finding that a book containing fraternity secrets was found near the body, and they retrieve it from the frat house. They find the book contains a rating system of girls the fraternity slept with, that the victim made an entry of a girl shortly before he died, and a page was removed from the book. Ballard still refuses to open up to her grandmother, while the cop stalking her continues to follow Martina. Ballard's therapist suggests she is still traumatized, and she finds that a cop named Charlie Grant, a former acquaintance of Laffont, disposed of the bullet. When she and Laffont talk to him, they find his signature was forged, confirming the cover-up. Parker tells her father she's not sure about getting her badge back. Chastain confronts Ballard, trying to apologize for not defending her against Olivas, but she rejects him, while her grandmother becomes more concerned about her. Speaking to the woman the victim slept with, she finds the woman knew about the book, and that the victim had a girlfriend he didn't like in the same sorority as her. Discovering the girlfriend's name was on the missing page, Ballard and Parker confront her, and she confesses to killing him. Parker's father admits he nearly left the force after the assault of Rodney King, but found a purpose watching the watchmen, and she gets her badge back. Ballard begins to assemble the board, wanting to move on from her trauma. At a bar, the cop tracking Ballard approaches Martina.
4	"Landmines"	Patrick Cady	Julissa Castillo	July 9, 2025
Ballard tells Parker and Laffont to keep the cover-up secret until they have more proof, and she and Laffont track the alibi of the suspect in Laura Wilson's murder. He admits the man actually with the suspect was an actor afraid of being outed, and gives new information on the killer's vehicle. Hatteras tries to locate the cleaning woman's family. Martina provides a rendering of the bullet from the John Doe murder. Parker admits she hasn't told her mother about getting her badge back. Hatteras connects the vehicle to a murder in Las Vegas, while the bullet is connected to a gang member currently incarcerated. Laffont informs Ballard that Chastain recently died in a car accident. Ballard, building the surfboard, is comforted by Aaron. Speaking to the gang member, Ballard and Parker discover the John Doe was a coyote associated with a cartel named Luis Ibarra. Ballard considers not going to Chastain's funeral, while Rawls offers to help Hatteras find the cleaning woman's family. Ballard reminisces about Chastain and is told the suspect who owns the vehicle has been found, and she and Rawls manage to arrest him. The cop continues to investigate Martina, and Hastings asks Rawls to tell him if Ballard is screwing up the case, while Ballard tells Laffont the suspect they caught is not the killer. Ballard suggests tracking Ibarra's family themselves but is upset when the others tell her she should attend Chastain's funeral. The next day, at the funeral, she is approached by Olivas but supported by Laffont and Parker. After the eulogy from Barrel, she is approached by Chastain's widow, who tells her Chastain realized he was wrong not to support her and regretted it. Hatteras finds out the cleaning woman's family in Ukraine were killed in the conflict. The gangster who told them about Ibarra decides to give up information in exchange for a release from jail and tells Ballard there is a group of cops in league with the cartel and one of them gave him the gun. Investigating the information, Laffont finds six possible cops it could be, including Anthony Driscoll, discharged for excessive force, who the gangster identifies. Ballard admits to Parker that Olivas assaulted her at a party and Chastain didn't support her claim. Driscoll meets the cop dating Martina at a bar and asks him about her.
5	"What's Done in the Dark"	Tori Garrett	Brandi Nicole	July 9, 2025
Ballard has dinner with Aaron, but is distracted. Driscoll calls his accomplice while he is with Martina and delivers guns to a group of gangsters and insults a captured snitch, before leaving in a police car. Rawls updates Hastings on the progress in the councilman's sister's case, and the latter pressures Ballard to get results. Ballard and Parker track the owner of a possible van, while Laffont, at home, traces Driscoll's movements before he disappeared. Ballard and Parker meet the van owner, who tells them her ex-husband took it when he left her, but mentions they have a daughter, who Ballard decides to get DNA from. They find the woman the ex-husband ran away with was reported missing a long time ago, and the ex-husband has also disappeared since then. Laffont updates Ballard on Driscoll, including where to find some of his contacts. Parker gets a DNA sample from the daughter. Questioning Driscoll's contact, Ballard and Laffont discover Ibarra was an informant in a DEA case, and Driscoll covered up his murder claiming he had fled back to Mexico. Discussing the case, Ballard decides to find Driscoll's whereabouts the day Ibarra was killed. Ballard bonds with Parker by inviting her for dinner and telling her how Olivas assaulted her, causing Parker to remember a similar experience she had with Olivas. Laffont tells Ballard that Driscoll seemingly has an alibi for the day of the murder, while Rawls and Hatteras investigate the scrapyard the van ended up at. Ballard finds Driscoll's alibi is a lie, while Rawls and Hatteras find the storage facility the van was kept at before being scrapped. Martina shows her boyfriend the office, revealing their progress in Ibarra's case. Parker has a breakdown at home. The cop meets Driscoll and tells him the case against him has no leads, but Driscoll doesn't believe him and threatens Martina. Rawls and Hatteras discover the van still belongs to the ex-husband and get a warrant for his unit. When the team opens the unit, they find several shoeboxes containing small items, seemingly as trophies, including one that belonged to Laura Wilson.
6	"Beneath the Surface"	Nefertite Nguvu	Liz Hsiao Lan Alper	July 9, 2025
Following the discovery of the trophies, Captain Berchem gives Ballard 72 hours to find more evidence before the case is given to homicide. Laffont sets up cameras to observe Driscoll at home, and informs the team there is no evidence on any of the trophies, while Parker tells them she has made contact with Ibarra's family. Driscoll finds out the gangster informant has been moved to a higher security division and realizes he snitched. Pearlman and his father go to the office to identify any of the trophies as belonging to his sister, but are unable to. Ballard gets a call from her grandmother, who berates her for not seeing her as she leaves town, and leaves to investigate a lead. She finds that the suspect was found dead before the councilman's sister was killed, and thus cannot possibly be her murderer. She retrieves the murder book and finds the woman he ran away with was killed in the same manner as the rest of the victims, causing the team to check for similarities among the victims. The gangster is attacked in prison. Parker identifies another victim, and Ballard confronts her over her stalking Olivas and tries to dissuade her from doing so, before Laffont informs them Driscoll has been spotted. They follow him to a meeting with a cop, where he bribes the other man, but are unable to identify the contact before the meeting ends. Parker tells Ballard Ibarra's girlfriend is in LA, without their son. They find none of the women in the case had similarities, but their killer may have been stalking them. Ballard finds out about the gangster's assault and she and Laffont speak to the girlfriend immediately, and she tells them she and Ibarra suspected another man of working for the cartel, who they determine to have been released by Driscoll after his last arrest. At the office, Parker tells Ballard the case has been transferred to homicide and Martina found evidence that the killer is still active. Parker confronts Olivas over their encounter and he mocks her, expressing no remorse. Ballard, continuing to investigate, finds a connection to a closed case and reports this to Berchem, who allows her team to keep the case. Returning home, Ballard falls asleep and dreams of her father's death, before being awakened by a masked man strangling her. She fights him off, eventually crushing his windpipe, and removes his mask, revealing him to be Driscoll. She calls an ambulance, and then Aaron, and manages to perform a tracheotomy to keep him alive, but Driscoll, unwilling to go to prison, commits suicide by removing the tube.
7	"Fork in the Road"	Jon Huertas	John Coveny	July 9, 2025
Following Driscoll's death, Ballard discreetly gives his phone to Laffont before heading to the hospital. At the office, he informs the others, while other cops arrive and take the evidence they have in the cases of Pearlman's sister and Ibarra. Berchem meets Ballard in the hospital to inform her of this, and that she will have a protective detail on her following the case's closure. When they take her to a motel, they are met by Bosch, who tells Ballard that Laffont gave him Driscoll's phone and he has discreetly collected all the information on it. She fills him in on Driscoll, and they conclude his attack on her was not ordered by the cartel. At the office, Ballard tells the team everything, and they begin work on a new case, that of Raehun Lee, a high school student who was presumed killed seven years prior. She and Laffont go to speak to his mother, and find he had a fight with another boy shortly before he disappeared, and was suspected to be part of a gang. Speaking to the other boy, they find footage of the fight exists, and Laffont forces Ballard to rest. Bosch and Mo, tracking Driscoll's contacts, locate another seemingly corrupt cop. Ballard meets her grandmother, and Laffont informs her a lead has been found in the case, and investigating it, they find Raehun's body and a gun, but the victim's brother is still unsatisfied. Laffont tells Ballard he understands her after she admits her father's body was never found. The next day, travelling to prison to speak to the man convicted of one of the murders presumably convicted by the serial killer, Ballard is told by Laffont that the gun does not lead to anyone identifiable. The man maintains his innocence, and Ballard brings the evidence to the gang member's lawyer, who agrees to help. Hatteras finds the video of the fight, which is shown to have been broken up by a teacher, who admits to Ballard and Rawls that Raehun had enemies, including the brother of the woman the gun was registered to. The brother maintains his innocence and claims the teacher took several students to the site where the body was found every year. After accepting Rawls' offer for a private security detail, Ballard returns home and is told by Hatteras that the teacher's mother owned a car matching the description of the one seen when Raehun disappeared. Ballard bonds with Aaron further, but passes out before he can confess something to her. The next day, Rawls informs her they found and processed the car, finding from the GPS that it was at the burial site the night Raehun went missing. She is then told his brother has gone missing with a gun and the team heads to the teacher's home to find him confronting the man. They calm him down, during which the teacher admits to having killed Raehun, and arrest them both. Later, Ballard is informed by Bosch that a number in Driscoll's phone was traced to Olivas.
8	"Last Call"	Sarah Boyd	Galeesa Murph & Thania St. John	July 9, 2025
After getting information from Driscoll's crime scene and retrieving his cell phone, Olivas meets with his group of corrupt cops and tells them that Ballard’s team doesn’t know about them, but orders Martina's boyfriend, Manny Santos, to continue observing her. Ballard tells the team about Olivas and the other four cops that have been identified from Driscoll’s phone. To maintain cover, the team continues to pursue their other cases, and Laffont and Rawls get a DNA sample from Ibarra's girlfriend to compare to her son, who Laffont is looking for. They also manage to identify the car Driscoll met with as having been driven by one of the corrupt cops. When Parker wonders about Olivas going unpunished for what he did to her, Ballard encourages her to tell her mother. Martina finds a burner phone in the jacket of her cop boyfriend Manny Santos and reads messages from Olivas, informing Ballard, who tells the rest of the team about her being compromised. Pearlman apologizes to them for them losing the case. When Martina tells them Manny wants to meet her, the team decides to use her as bait to trap him, and manage to. Facing time, Manny agrees to testify against the other corrupt cops, and provides evidence against them. Laffont finds a lead into Ibarra's missing son, and he and Ballard present Manny's confession to Berchem, who agrees to move on the cops. Parker admits to her mother that she was sexually assaulted by Olivas. After not getting any new information from the ones currently investigating the Pearlman case, Ballard finds out that Laffont has found Ibarra's child. After blowing off Aaron, who has become a paramedic, Ballard convinces Captain Berchem to give her back the Pearlman case by telling him she has another theory. Ballard presents this theory to the team; all the women killed were moving up in their careers and were killed for not "knowing their place", but Hatteras points out this doesn't match Pearlman's sister. Reviewing the case, Ballard and Parker determine a lipstick tube found at the sister's crime scene didn't belong to her. Later, Ballard and Parker are present when Olivas is arrested.
9	"Collateral"	Logan Kibens	Ralph Gifford	July 9, 2025
When the lipstick tube is analyzed, the team finds a DNA match to a woman named Naomi Bennet, who the team finds was an early victim of the killer who survived her assault. Ballard informs Berchem, who tells her the indictments on the corrupt cops are coming. Heading to interview Naomi, Ballard is congratulated by Jerry Edgar. Laffont collects Ibarra's son's DNA and the team is told they need to provide written statements for the corruption case. When Ballard and Parker interview Naomi, she is unable to remember, and they give her the night to think it over. The next day, they bring her to the office, and she admits she was moving ahead in life when she was assaulted. Pearlman and Hastings arrive and ask Ballard to do an interview with the councilman. Martina asks Rawls to review her statement, which he does, while Laffont informs Ballard he has found a connection between Naomi and another victim. Naomi does not recognize the man and his DNA does not match the killer's when Ballard and Rawls collect it. Ballard confesses to her grandmother that she likes cold case work better than homicide. When Parker and Laffont show Naomi the crime scene, she remembers her attacker had brown eyes. In the interview, Ballard hears that there are rumors about her being replaced, which the councilman denies. Returning home, Ballard meets Aaron, who admits he wants more and knows she can't commit, and ends their relationship. The next day, Naomi offers a wider search grid, and when she arrives at the office, Ballard finds Rawls absent. Looking into the new information provided by Naomi, Ballard and Laffont find a connection which Naomi confirms; her attacker was Gary Pearlman, the councilman's father. Rawls, having gone to speak to Pearlman about keeping Ballard in charge, arrives at his house only to find Gary, and tells him about Naomi. When Ballard calls and tells him Gary is the killer, Gary realizes who he is talking to, they both pull guns and a shot is heard.
10	"End of the Line"	Sarah Boyd	Michael Alaimo & Kendall Sherwood	July 9, 2025
Ballard arrives at the house to find Rawls is taken out on a stretcher and his car missing, presumably stolen by Gary, and consoles the councilman, who is in disbelief. Berchem coordinates the manhunt for Gary and has Ballard speak to the councilman, and she tells him her suspicion that Gary wasn't his sister's biological father, which Hatteras later confirms, as well as that the DNA of the palm print was indeed Gary's. Pearlman tells her Gary has no close friends to go to, and Ballard doesn't think he will run knowing Naomi survived. She announces Naomi's survival on television alongside Pearlman asking his father to surrender. Heading to the hospital, Ballard and Parker are accosted by Olivas' wife, and tell her to get the truth from Berchem. Rawls' car is found, and Berchem suggests that Gary has fled to Mexico, while the team is informed that Rawls did not survive. At his funeral, Ballard gives the eulogy and informs Edgar she will not return to homicide. Later, Pearlman informs Ballard at the office that he will not continue to run for reelection, but she still has friends in the council, and asks her to bring his father in alive. After he leaves, the power shuts off and Ballard is attacked by Gary, but subdues him. In custody, Gary confesses that he knew Sarah Pearlman was not his biological daughter, and that he killed her after she found his trophies and assumed he was having an affair. Ballard informs Bosch that Gary killed women because his father blamed him for his mother leaving. Later, she takes her father's custom board out on the ocean, and the wrongly accused man is released from prison, while Laffont reunites Ibarra's missing son with his mother. Bosch informs Ballard that Olivas took a deal and will not be charged. Ballard confronts the DA, Honey Chandler, who admits they needed more inside information than Manny could provide. Ballard confronts Olivas at his house, and he taunts her, but she pulls her gun and leaves after mocking him for losing his career and family. Later, while discussing the case with Parker, Ballard is arrested as a suspect for killing Olivas.

== Production ==
=== Development ===
Ballard was announced in 2023 as the next expansion of the Bosch television universe. Michael Alaimo and Kendall Sherwood created the series, with author Michael Connelly as co-creator and executive producer. The show draws inspiration from his Renée Ballard novel series, including The Late Show (2017), The Dark Hours (2021), and Desert Star (2022). Ballard is executive produced by Connelly, Henrik Bastin, Michael Alaimo, Kendall Sherwood, Trish Hofmann, Jet Wilkinson, and Melissa Aouate. Jasmine Russ is co-executive producer, while Jamie Boscardin Martin and Trey Batchelor also contribute as co-executive producers. Additionally, Theresa Snider is co-executive producer. Sherwood and Alaimo serve as showrunners.

On October 6, 2025, the series was renewed for a second season.

=== Filming ===
Principal photography for the first season began in July 2024 and concluded in November 2024. Filming took place on location in Los Angeles to maintain continuity with the visual style of the Bosch franchise.

== Release ==
All 10 episodes of the series were released on Amazon Prime Video on July 9, 2025.

== Reception ==
The review aggregator website Rotten Tomatoes reported a 100% approval rating based on 22 critic reviews. The website's critics consensus reads, "A crisp procedural with a magnetic lead in Maggie Q, Ballard is a worthy sibling series to Bosch that comes with its own unique strengths." Metacritic, which uses a weighted average, assigned a score of 83 out of 100 based on 7 critics, indicating "universal acclaim".
