= Welliver =

Welliver is a surname. Notable people with the surname include:

- Chauncy Welliver (born 1983), American-New Zealand heavyweight boxer
- Neil Welliver (1929–2005), American artist
- Titus Welliver (born 1961), American actor
