= Thot Squad =

American rapper and songwriter

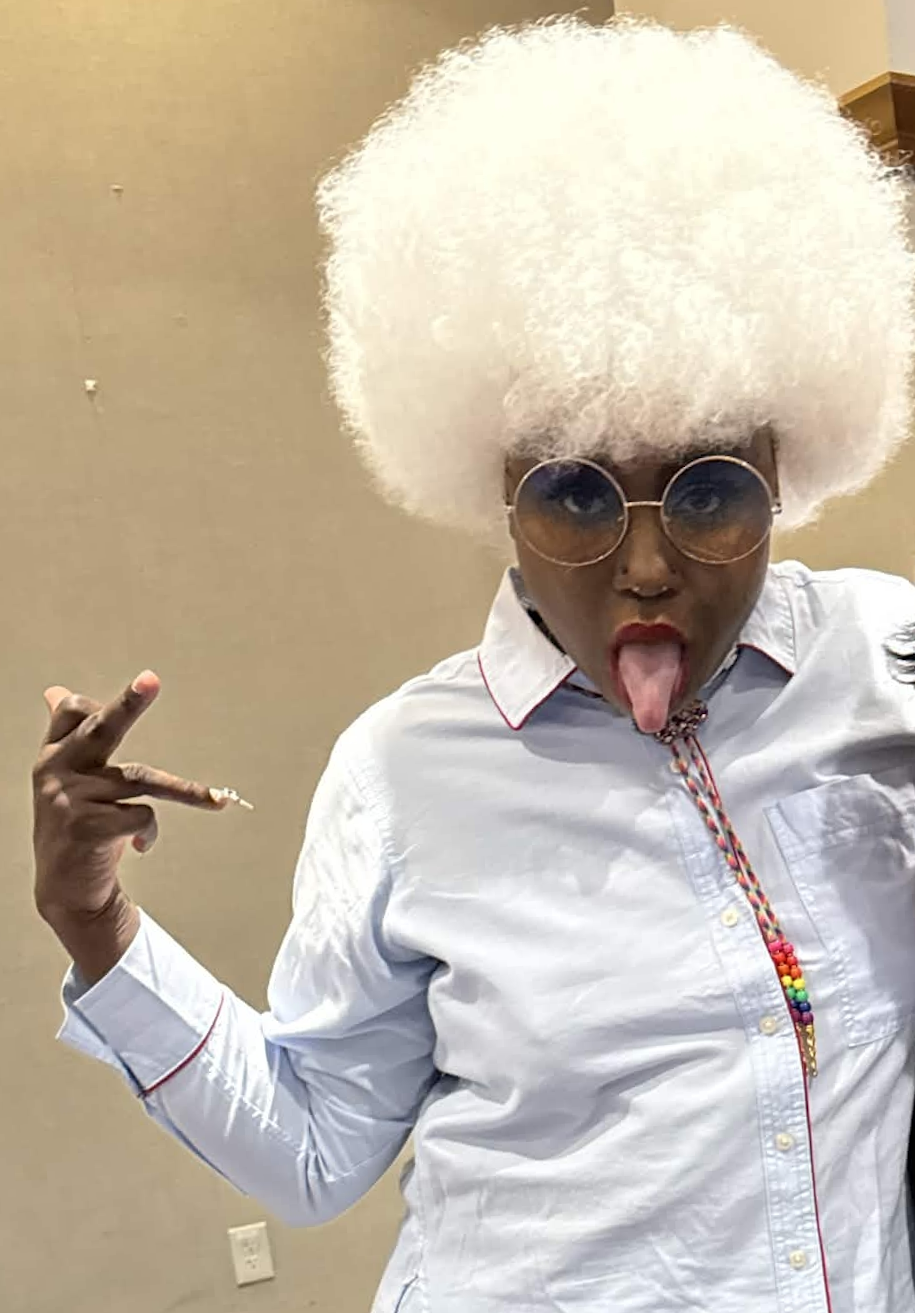
- Thot Squad in 2026

Background information
- Also known as: Blvck Bunnie
- Born: Flint, Michigan, U.S.
- Occupations: Rapper; songwriter
- Years active: 2022–present
- Spouse: Benny Ari
- Website: https://thotsquad.us/bio

Harvey Ari, known professionally as Thot Squad and Blvck Bunnie, (Note: Both Thot Squad and Blvck Bunnie are stylized in all capital letters.) is an American rapper and songwriter. They (Note: Thot Squad uses the pronouns they/them.) began their career in 2022 and earned viral attention for their energetic and sexually cathartic music. They were introduced to a wider audience after appearing in the video game Dispatch (2025), along with touring with Qveen Herby on her Isle of Queen Tour and featuring on a song on the same titled album.

== Career ==
Thot Squad began creating music with Ari in 2022 with the goal of becoming a one-hit wonder, inspired by Zack Fox's 2019 song "Jesus Is the One (I Got Depression)". Their debut single, "Super Soaker", was released in January 2022. In May 2022, they opened for rapper Cupcakke, who is one of their major influences. Sixteen singles were released across 2022 and 2023. Their song "Pound Cake", released in November 2023, earned viral attention online. The Escapist later dubbed it a "banger".

In March 2024, they became the first non-binary artist to perform at the Black Queer Advancement Festival. In July 2024, they released the single "Hoes Depressed", later described by Kotaku as "a catchy-as-hell cheerleader-style hip-hop bop". In September 2024, they were a main act at Pop Montreal and named by Paper magazine as a "must-see". They released a total of three singles and one remix single in 2024.

In December 2024, Thot Squad was cast in the episodic video game Dispatch after their music caught the attention of AdHoc Studio; both "Pound Cake" and "Hoes Depressed" appear in the game. They said in an interview that they felt "very fortunate that they (AdHoc) like the things I say and they like the things I sing." Released throughout October and November 2025, David Jagneaux from Comic Book Resources singled out their character and performance as his favorite, noting that it also brought more attention to their music. For Dispatch, they were nominated for Supporting Performance in a Comedy at the 2026 NAVGTR Awards.

From March to April 2025, Thot Squad embarked on the Thots n' Prayers tour with Rob Apollo. They released a live EP, Thot Squad x AMP, with the Art of Music Project in April 2025. This was followed by a string of performances across the United States from May to October 2025.

In April 2026, Nylon magazine titled Thot Squad as one of "The New Faces of Party Rap". They appeared as a guest artist on Qveen Herby's 2026 song "The Fool". They began touring with Qveen Herby as a supporting act for her Isle of Qveen Tour from May to August 2026. They wrote on social media that, during a break in the tour, they will begin work on their debut studio album Ungovernable, planning its release for sometime in 2026.

== Personal life ==
Thot Squad was born in Flint, Michigan and lives with their husband, Benjamin Aurand, known professionally as Benny Ari. They are non-binary and use the pronouns they/them.

== Discography ==
Thot Squad discography
- Studio albums: 1
- EPs: 1
- Singles: 24
- Music videos: 12

=== Studio albums ===
List of studio albums, showing year released and selected details
Title	Details
Ungovernable	Scheduled: January 1 2027; Label: Self-released; Format: Digital download, streaming

=== Extended plays ===
List of extended plays, showing year released and selected details
Title	Details
Thot Squad x AMP (Live Session)	Released: April 7, 2025; Label: The Art of Music Project; Format: Digital download, streaming

=== Singles ===
List of singles, showing year released and associated albums
Title	Year	Album
"Super Soaker"	2022	Non-album singles
"Nostril"	2022	Non-album singles
"No Other Hoe"	2022	Non-album singles
"Throat" (feat. Dvddy Jo)	2022	Non-album singles
"I.F.I.F."	2022	Non-album singles
"I Fight Bitches"	2022	Non-album singles
"Bad Bitch" (feat. Envyd)	2022	Non-album singles
"On Sight (The Christmas Breakup Song)"	2022	Non-album singles
"Y.A.M.S."	2022	Non-album singles
"Scamlanta"	2023	Non-album singles
"Kiki"	2023	Non-album singles
"How Dare You"	2023	Non-album singles
"Shoo Doo"	2023	Non-album singles
"Fafo"	2023	Non-album singles
"Pause"	2023	Non-album singles
"Row Tha Boat"	2023	Non-album singles
"Pound Cake"	2023	Non-album singles
"Bum Bitch"	2024	Non-album singles
"That's My Hair"	2024	Non-album singles
"Hoes Depressed"	2024	Non-album singles
"Hoes Depressed (Left Cheerleader Remix)" (feat. Sophie Hunter)	2024	Non-album singles
"Abandon Him"	2025	Non-album singles
"BSTFU"	2025	Non-album singles
"C U Later"	2025	Non-album singles

=== Guest appearances ===
List of guest appearances, showing year released, artist(s), and associated albums
Title	Year	Artist(s)	Album
"The Fool" (feat. Thot Squad)	2026	Qveen Herby	Isle of Qveen

=== Music videos ===
List of music videos, showing year released and director
Title	Year	Other performer(s) credited	Director(s)	Ref.
"Nostril"	2022	None	Mac	
"No Other Hoe"	2022	None	Mac	
"I.F.I.F."	2022	None	Thot Squad	
"Bad Bitch"	2022	Envyd	Mac	
"Kiki"	2023	None	Benny Ari	
"Row Tha Boat"	2023	None	Benny Ari	
"Bum Bitch"	2024	None	Benny Ari	
"That's My Hair"	2024	None	Benny Ari	
"Hoes Depressed"	2024	None	Benny Ari	
"Hoes Depressed (Left Cheerleader Remix)"	2024	Sophie Hunter	Benny Ari	
"Abandon Him"	2025	None	Benny Ari	
"BSTFU"	2025	None	Benny Ari	

== Filmography ==
=== Video games ===
Year	Title	Role	Notes
2025	Dispatch	Prism / Alice	Voice role; credited as "Harvey aka Thot Squad"

== Tours ==
Headlining

- Thots n' Prayers Tour (with Rob Apollo) (2025)

Supporting

- Qveen Herby – Isle of Qveen Tour (2026)

== Awards and nominations ==
Award	Year (Note: Indicates the year of ceremony. Each year is linked to the article about the awards held that year, wherever possible.)	Category	Nominated work	Result	Ref.
NAVGTR Awards	2026	Supporting Performance in a Comedy	Dispatch	Nominated	
