= Courtney Taylor =

Courtney Taylor may refer to:

- Courtney Taylor (gridiron football) (born 1984), professional football player
- Courtney Taylor-Taylor (born 1967), born Courtney Taylor, musician
- Courtney Taylor (actress), American actress and comedian

== See also ==
- Courtenay Taylor (born 1969), American voice over actress
