= Joel Haver =

Canadian filmmaker and YouTuber (born 1996)

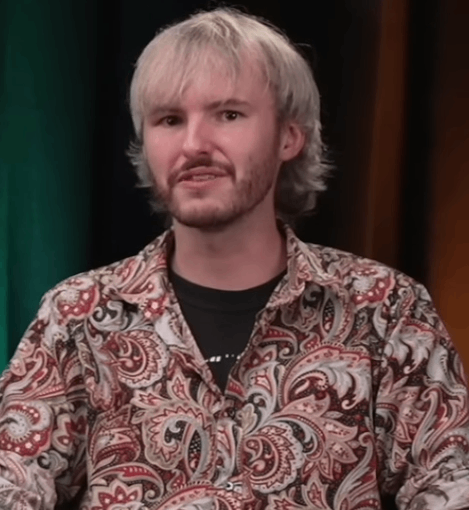
- Haver in 2025
- Born: February 13, 1996 (age 30); Bridgewater, Nova Scotia, Canada
- Education: Pratt Institute
- Occupations: YouTuber; filmmaker

YouTube information
- Channel: Joel Haver
- Years active: 2012–present
- Genres: Animation; comedy; drama
- Subscribers: 2.12 million
- Views: 314 million
- Last updated: June 19, 2026

Joel Haver (born February 13, 1996) is a Canadian-American YouTuber and filmmaker, best known for his rotoscoped skits and low-budget feature-length films. Haver typically plays multiple roles in acting and production–most notably in a 12 movie anthology released throughout 2024. He has worked in film, voice-over, and TV productions, recently voicing the character Waterboy in the 2025 video game Dispatch.

== Life and career ==
Haver was born to Canadian parents on February 13, 1996, in Bridgewater, Nova Scotia, Canada. He grew up in Belchertown, Massachusetts, and has an older brother. Haver studied film at the Pratt Institute in New York City, graduating with a Bachelor of Arts in filmmaking in 2018.

Haver produces comedy sketches and independent films, frequently using rotoscoped animation, a form of animation created by tracing on top of filmed footage. His films are known for their low-budget style, with Haver typically playing multiple roles in acting and production. In addition to his own channel, he has contributed to films, voice-overs, and TV productions, most notably in the video game Dispatch.

Haver has hosted an annual "Movies Shot During the Oscars" film festival, in which he encourages independent filmmakers to shoot feature-length films during the broadcast of the yearly Academy Awards ceremony. Throughout the year, in 2024, Haver published a film anthology of 12 movies, each movie being shot and edited in the span of approximately one month. He noted that he is passionate about making filmmaking more accessible.

In July 2022, Joel Haver published the "Toilet Paper Bears" comedy sketch on his YouTube channel, depicting a dispute between the Charmin Bears family, in which the son confronts his father about his dream to be a dancer, to his father's disappointment. Later that year, Saturday Night Live aired the "Charmin Bears" sketch, with similarities to Haver's video. Notably, a young bear confronts his father about his dream to be a dancer, the bears are colored blue, and the father and the son wear similar attire. In late July, following the SNL airing, Haver published a video entitled "SNL stole my video". Despite the title, he denied accusations of theft, rather attributing the similarities to parallel thinking. Haver remarked, "If I still was a smaller creator, which I was for a long time, I could see it rubbing me the wrong way."

== Filmography ==
Directed features
Year	Title	Distributor
2016	We Are Sasquatch	YouTube
2017	31 Days in Marshall, North Carolina	YouTube
2019	Island	YouTube
2019	Taking a Little Time to Feel Sorry for Myself	YouTube
2019	I'M GOING TO BE FAMOUS - The Movie	YouTube
2020	Forget About Everything for Awhile	YouTube
2020	Pretend That You Love Me	YouTube
2021	A Simple Smash and Bash Job Gone Wrong	YouTube
2021	Drowning in Potential	YouTube
2022	The Bad Guy, The Wolf and the Surprise Party	YouTube
2022	We Have to Leave Here Together	YouTube
2023	Things Could Always Be Worse	YouTube
2023	goodlongpee the movie	YouTube
2024	The Hero's Journey aka My Life aka The Caleb Johnston Story (I'm Caleb)	YouTube
2024	Anyone Else But Me	YouTube
2024	The Text	YouTube
2024	Hello My Beautiful Creatures	YouTube
2024	It Just Takes Time	YouTube
2024	Hiccups	YouTube
2024	The Diarrhea Brothers Save the Day	YouTube
2024	Love, Celeste	YouTube
2024	The 9th Movie	YouTube
2024	A Little Film About Friendship	YouTube
2024	You're Point Girl	YouTube
2024	Coming Home	YouTube
2025	The Call	YouTube
2025	The Womanizer	YouTube
2026	The Email	YouTube

Other contributions
Year	Title	Role
2020	Sheep Theater	Actor
2021	Off the Air	Director, Actor, Animator
2022	Making Youtube	Actor
2022	The Paloni Show! Halloween Special!	Actor, Guest Animator
2022	Killer Thriller	Actor
2022	High on Life	Voice Actor
2024	Smiling Friends	Actor, Guest Animator
2024	Hello My Beautiful Creatures	Animation, Soundtrack
2025	Dispatch	Voice Actor (Waterboy)
