= Dispatch (video game) =

2025 video game

- Developer: AdHoc Studio (Note: Animation provided by Igloo Studio. PS5 version ported by Plastic Fern Studios. Nintendo Switch and Nintendo Switch 2 versions ported by PlayEveryWare.)
- Publisher: AdHoc Studio (Note: Physical version published by PM Studios.)
- Directors: Nick Herman; Dennis Lenart; Chris Rebbert
- Producer: Natalie Herman
- Designer: Charles Marcolim
- Programmer: Seth Kingsley
- Artist: Derek Stratton
- Writers: Pierre Shorette; Suzee Matson; Ashley Jeffalone; Chad Rhiness; Chris Rebbert
- Composer: Andrew Arcadi (Note: Additional music by Skyler Barto)
- Engine: Unreal Engine 4
- Platforms: PlayStation 5; Windows; Nintendo Switch; Nintendo Switch 2; Xbox Series X/S; Android; iOS
- Release: Episodes 1–2: PS5, Windows; WW: October 22, 2025; Episodes 3–4: PS5, Windows; WW: October 29, 2025; Episodes 5–6: PS5, Windows; WW: November 5, 2025; Episodes 7–8: PS5, Windows; WW: November 12, 2025; Other versions: Switch, Switch 2; WW: January 28, 2026 Xbox Series X/S; WW: July 29, 2026 Android, iOS; WW: December 9, 2026
- Genres: Adventure, interactive film, simulation
- Mode: Single-player

Dispatch is a 2025 episodic adventure game developed and published by the American developer AdHoc Studio. Described as a superhero workplace comedy, the game has the player take the role of Robert Robertson III, formerly the superhero Mecha Man, who has to take a job as a dispatcher for villains-turned-superheroes after his mecha suit is destroyed in battle. Its cast includes the voices of Aaron Paul, Jeffrey Wright, Erin Yvette, Laura Bailey, Travis Willingham, and Matthew Mercer, as well as content creators jacksepticeye, MoistCr1tikal, Joel Haver, Alanah Pearce, and rappers Yung Gravy and Thot Squad.

Dispatch consists of eight episodes released on PlayStation 5 and Windows throughout October and November 2025. Versions for Nintendo Switch and Nintendo Switch 2 were released in January 2026, and Xbox Series X/S in July 2026. It is scheduled to release on Android and iOS in December 2026. The game received generally favorable reviews from critics and sold over 5 million copies.

== Gameplay ==
Dialogue trees are used for in-game conversations.

Dispatch is an adventure game, where the player's choices affect the story via the use of dialogue trees in conversations with other characters. A large form of the gameplay consists of navigating a superhero team across the Superhero Dispatch Network (SDN) map to crimes and events, where the player must strategically decide which hero or heroes best fit the activity based on their stats and character traits, while also managing their cooldowns. In the hacking minigame, the player must navigate pathways and complete quick time events.

== Synopsis ==
=== Setting ===
Dispatch is set in an alternate Los Angeles where superpowers, and consequently superheroes and supervillains, are commonplace, dividing society between "supers" (those born with powers such as flight and invisibility or born with a different appearance) and "normies" (those devoid of superpowers). While there are independent superheroes, most of them work for the Superhero Dispatch Network (SDN), which provides services and protection for their subscribers.

=== Plot ===
Robert Robertson III, who followed in the footsteps of his father and grandfather to pilot the mech suit built by the latter and become the superhero Mecha Man, attempts to locate his father's killer, the supervillain Elliot Connors / Shroud, but is lured into a trap by Shroud's gang, the Red Ring. Robert narrowly escapes and realizes a bomb has been placed on his mech suit. He survives, but due to the suit being extensively damaged and having already heavily indebted himself trying to maintain it, he announces his retirement to the press. After failing to stop a robbery on his own, Robert is approached by the superhero Mandy / Blonde Blazer, who proposes he works at the local branch of the Superhero Dispatch Network (SDN) as a dispatcher in exchange for help repairing his suit, and Robert accepts.

On his first day, he encounters his old friend Chase / Track Star, a retired speedster hero who, due to a side effect of his powers, appears 80-years-old at 39. Robert is assigned to the Z-Team, a group of supervillains that SDN is working to reform via their Phoenix Program. Its members are at the bottom of the branch's leader boards due to poor performance and are unruly. They do not take Robert seriously and have driven away previous dispatchers in the past. He gets into an argument with one of the Z-Team's members, Courtney / Invisigal, after she disobeys a direct order and allows a supervillain to escape. Blazer tasks Robert with cutting one of the Z-Team's members, Sonar or Coupé, to discourage further poor performances and replace them with either SDN janitor Waterboy or Phenomaman, a former top hero and Blazer's ex-boyfriend.

As Robert grows closer to either Blazer or Invisigal and builds a rapport with the Z-Team, he rebuilds the Mecha Man suit with help from SDN technical specialist Royd, but fails to replicate its missing power source, the Astral Pulse. Invisigal and Royd locate it, but she and Blazer disagree over how to retrieve it before Shroud and the Red Ring can. Chase berates Invisigal for her criminal past, causing her to leave in an attempt to retrieve the Astral Pulse alone. With Robert's assistance, she evades the Red Ring and reaches the Astral Pulse, but is intercepted by Shroud, who seemingly steals it and incapacitates her. Chase uses his speed to rescue her before collapsing.

With Chase hospitalized, the majority of the Z-Team votes to cut Invisigal. She admits to Robert that she was the one who planted the bomb on Robert's mech suit, having previously worked for Shroud and the Red Ring before joining the Phoenix Program. Robert is captured by Shroud and the cut Z-Team member. Shroud reveals Invisigal hid the Astral Pulse from both of them and tortures Robert in a failed attempt at locating it. Blazer rescues Robert, but the Red Ring retaliates by launching an assault on Los Angeles.

As the Z-Team and SDN fight back, Shroud leads a Red Ring detachment in attacking SDN's call center. Royd captures Invisigal and retrieves the Astral Pulse, allowing Robert to join the fight as Mecha Man while Blazer gives her amulet, the source of her powers, to Chase to revive him and help them further. Robert, Chase, Blazer, and the Z-Team defeat the Red Ring, but Shroud takes Robert's dog Beef hostage, forcing Robert to surrender.

If the player decided to trust Invisigal throughout the series despite her actions, she will take a bullet for Robert, who beats Shroud into submission before either killing or sparing him. Invisigal is subsequently welcomed back into the Z-Team. If Robert killed Shroud, he is suspended pending an investigation, though Blazer and Chase do not hold it against him. If the player repeatedly chose not to trust Invisigal however, she will kill Shroud, take his mask, and abandon Robert and the Z-Team.

Regardless of the choices made, the game ends with the Red Ring getting defeated and arrested, the cut Z-Team member being either forgiven or sent to prison, and the Z-Team hailed as heroes while the SDN branch undergoes repairs.

=== Cast and characters ===
==== Main ====
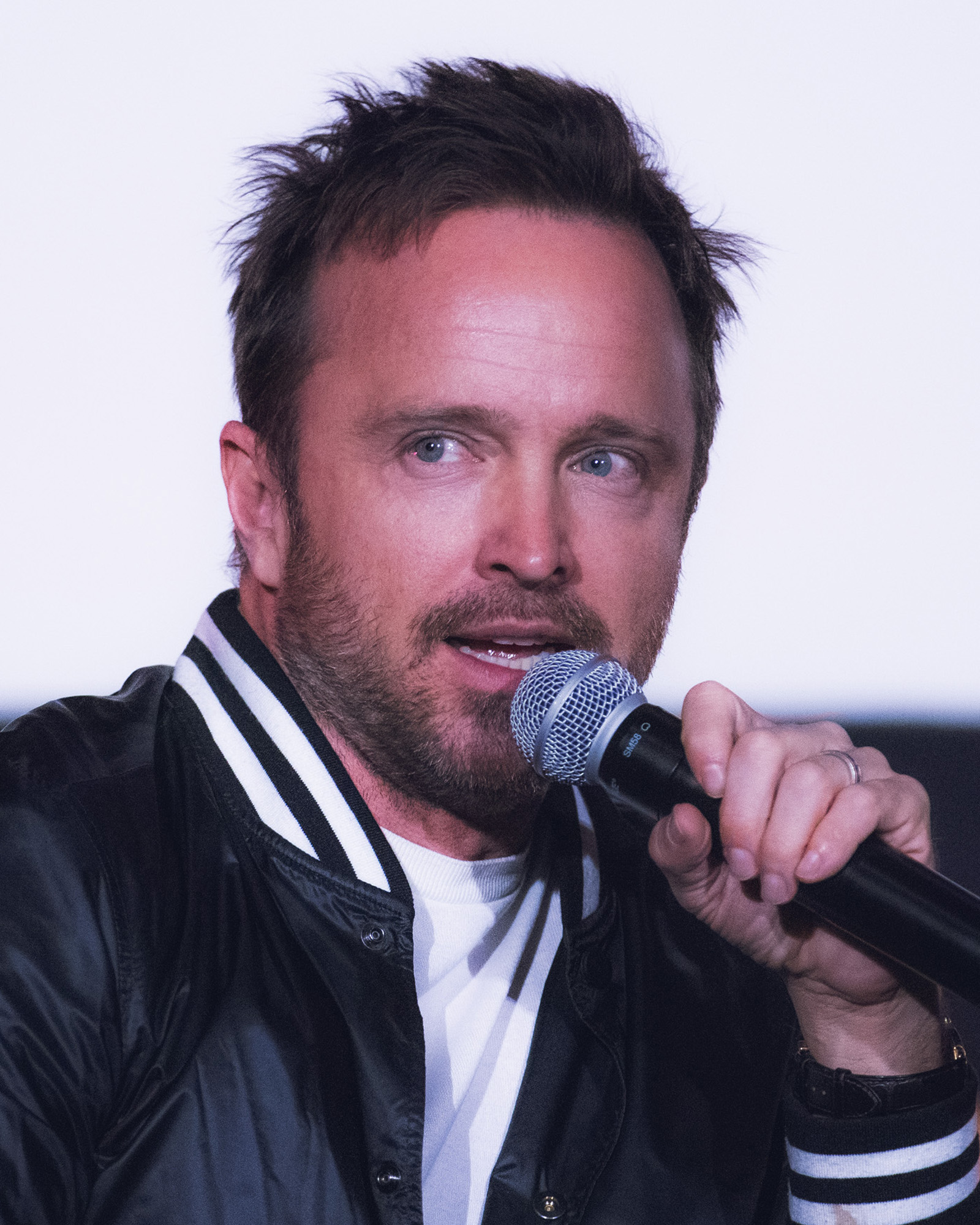
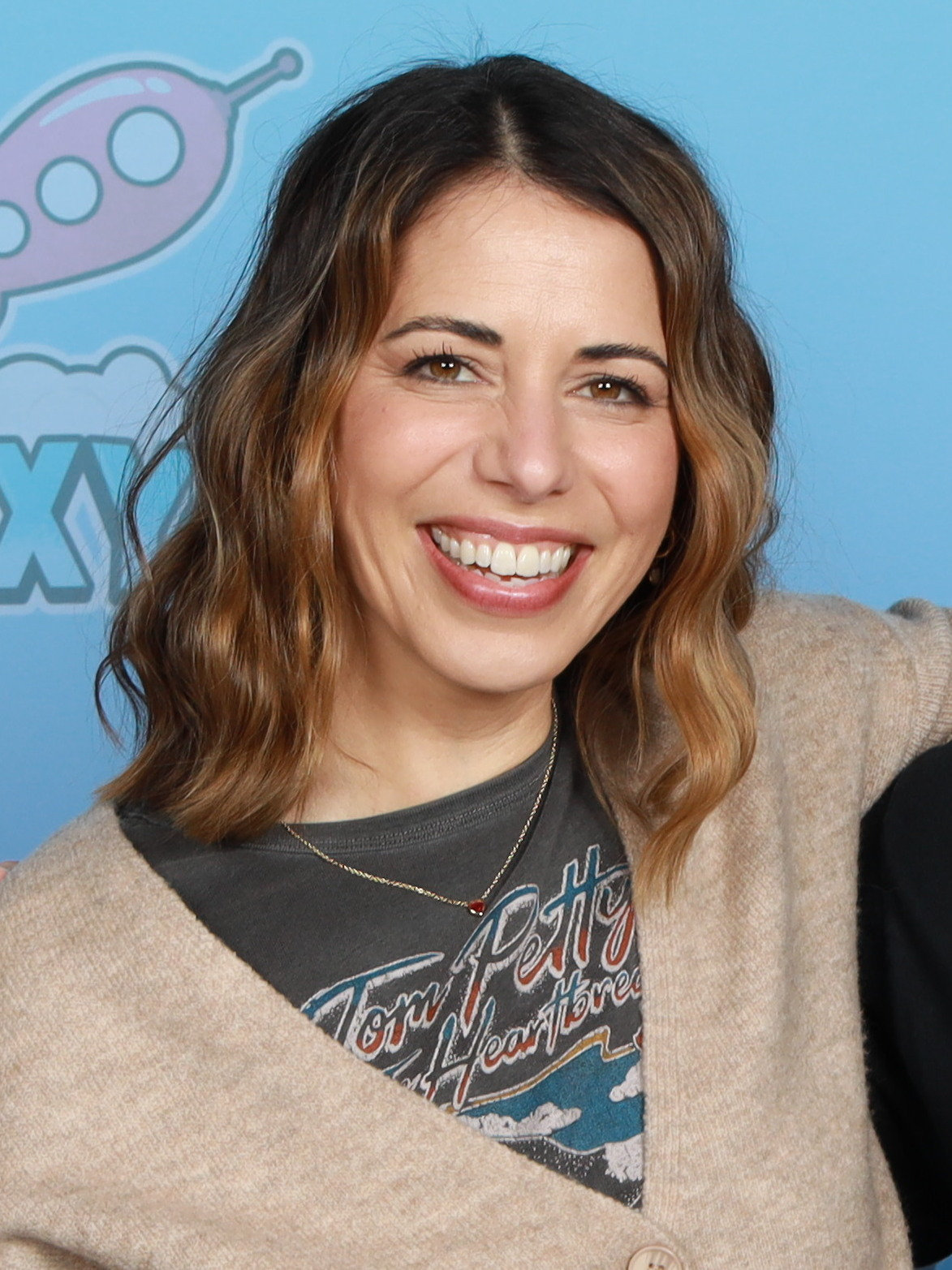
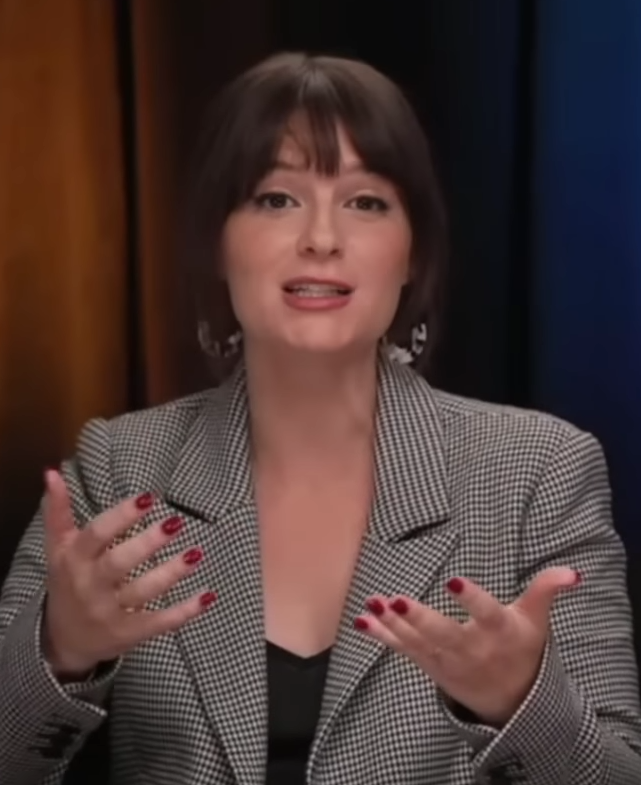
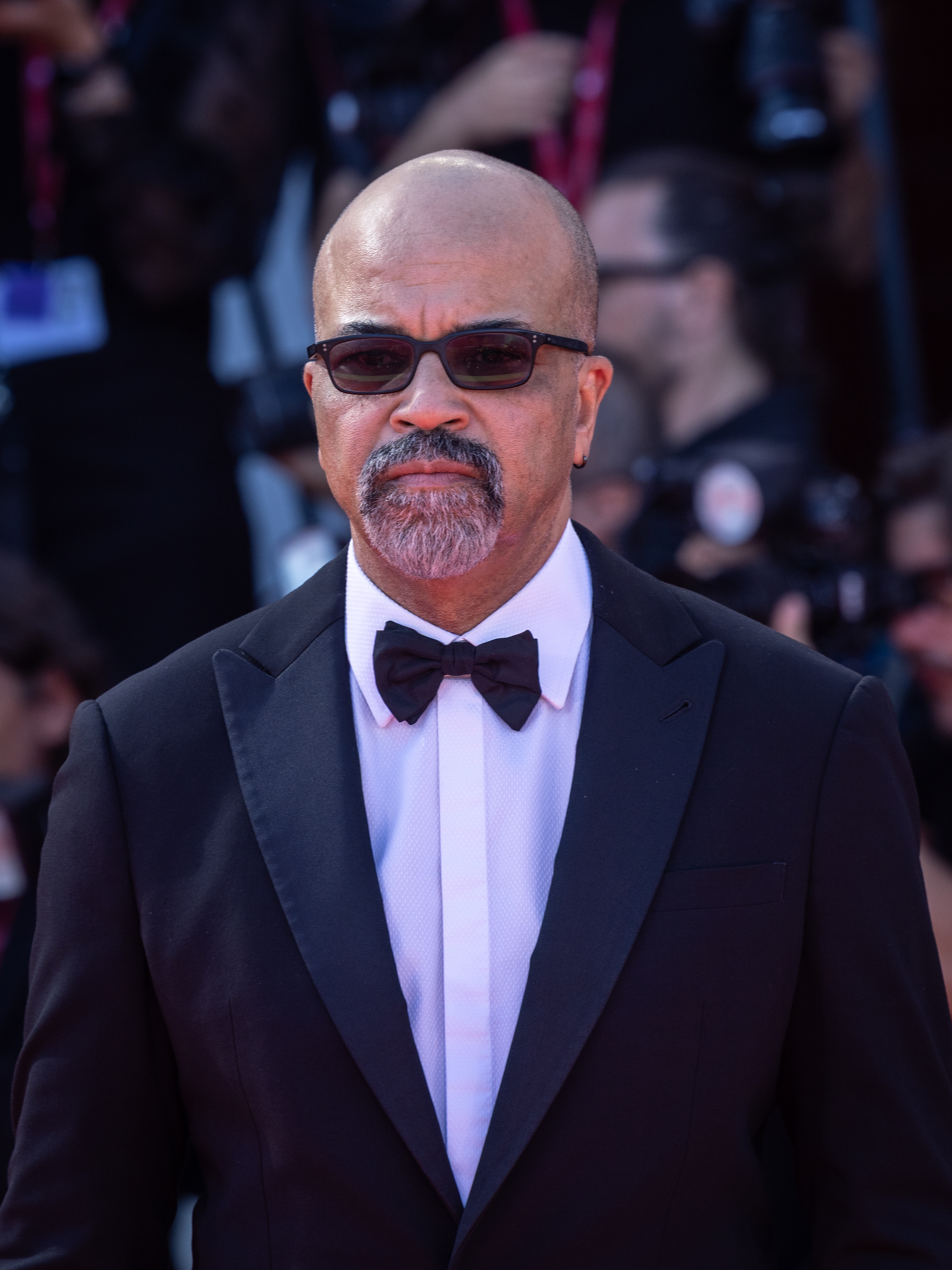
Clockwise from top left: Aaron Paul, Laura Bailey, Jeffrey Wright, and Erin Yvette, voice Robert / Mecha Man, Courtney / Invisigal, Chase / Track Star, and Mandy / Blonde Blazer, respectively.
- Aaron Paul as Robert Robertson III / Mecha Man – A third-generation superhero who lacks powers but possesses a mechanical suit with various weaponry originally built by his grandfather. After the destruction of his suit and being forced into retirement, he secures a job at SDN as a dispatcher to earn finances to repair it. Rahul Kohli was originally in consideration for the role by the studio.
  - Billy Cristos Jr. as Young Robert
- Laura Bailey as Courtney / Invisigal – A rebellious former villain formerly known as Invisibitch and the lowest-ranking member of the Z-Team who can turn invisible while holding her breath.
- Erin Yvette as Mandy / Blonde Blazer – A corporate superhero for hire, the manager of SDN's Los Angeles division, and Phenomaman's ex-girlfriend who wears an amulet that grants her the power of flight, super-strength, energy blasts, and a resistance to toxins. Without it, she loses her superhuman physique and becomes a brunette.
- Fahim Anwar (Note: Credited under his stage character name, Lance Cantstopolis) as Chad / Flambae – An Afghan former supervillain turned hero, former nemesis of Mecha Man, and member of the Z-Team who possesses pyrokinesis and flameproof skin.
- MoistCr1tikal (Note: Credited under his legal name, Charles White) as Victor / Sonar – A highly intelligent man/bat hybrid, Harvard graduate, recovering cocaine addict, and member of the Z-Team who can transform into a large monstrous bat.
- Alanah Pearce as Malevola Gibb – A broadsword wielding half-demoness, Sonar's Narcotics Anonymous (NA) sponsor, and member of the Z-Team who can create portals.
- jacksepticeye (Note: Credited under his legal name, Seán McLoughlin) as Colm / Punch Up – An Irish former carnival strongman, Coupé's ex-boyfriend, and member of the Z-Team who acquired the strength of ten men and an immunity to pain from a sorceress in exchange for half of his height.
- Thot Squad (Note: Credited as Harvey aka Thot Squad) as Alice / Prism – A pop star influencer and member of the Z-Team who possesses photokinesis, the ability to generate and manipulate light.
- Mayanna Berrin as Janelle / Coupé – A former assassin and ballerina, Punch Up's ex-girlfriend, and member of the Z-Team who can fly and possesses umbrakinesis, the ability to generate and manipulate shadows, and an assortment of daggers.
- Yung Gravy (Note: Credited as Matthew "Yung Gravy" Hauri) as Bruno / Golem – A magical construct made of dirt and clay and member of the Z-Team.
- Travis Willingham as Katon-Ur / Phenomaman – A once highly-regarded hero-for-hire from a distant planet, public face for SDN, Blonde Blazer's ex-boyfriend, and member of the Z-Team who can fly, possesses super-strength, and suffers from bouts of depression.
- Joel Haver as Herman "Herm" / Waterboy – An insecure SDN janitor who can produce water from his mouth and body.
- Tanoai Reed as Roy / Royd – A muscular member of the Phoenix Program who was arrested by Robert's father, became a mechanic for SDN, and helps repair Robert's Mecha Man suit.
- Matthew Mercer as Elliot Connors / Shroud – A former member of the Brave Brigade who became a supervillain and leader of the Red Ring who killed Robert's father and possesses a mask that grants predictive abilities and various cybernetic augmentations.
- Jeffrey Wright as Chase / Track Star / Starblazer – A speedster, former member of the Brave Brigade, old friend of Robert's father, and Robert's dispatching mentor who recommends him for the job. Due to his powers causing him to age 50 times faster than normal while in use, leading him to appear 80-years-old at 39, he is forced to retire and work at SDN as part of their hero records database and a dispatcher.
  - Elijah Wright as Young Chase

==== Recurring ====
- Nimesh Patel as Galen – An experienced SDN dispatcher who possesses super hearing.
- Jared Goldstein as Toxic – A high-ranking member of the Red Ring who possesses the power of acidity, flight, and self-healing.
- Liam O'Brien as Kellen Sebastian / Lightningstruck – A minor villain and member of the Red Ring with electroshock blasters.
- Frankie Quiñones as Armstrong – A high-ranking member of the Red Ring who possesses a cybernetic second pair of arms.
- Ashley Johnson as Ashley Rhiness – A reporter for San Pedro Daily who often reports on SDN.

Jenn An, Brian Dobson, Liv Hamilton, Taliesin Jaffe, Isaac Jay, Marisha Ray, Sam Riegel, Kelly Sheridan, Vincent Tong, and Sam Vincent all provide additional voices.

== Episodes ==
Dispatch is separated into eight episodes.

No.	Title	Directed by	Written by	Original release date
1	"Pivot"	Nick Herman and Dennis Lenart	Pierre Shorette, Mayanna Berrin, Ashley Jeffalone, Suzee Matson, Polly Raguimov, Chris Rebbert, and Chad Rhiness	October 22, 2025
Robert Robertson, AKA Mecha Man, tracks down his father's killer and things take an unexpected turn.
2	"Onboard"	Nick Herman and Dennis Lenart	Pierre Shorette, Mayanna Berrin, Suzee Matson, Chad Rhiness, Ashley Jeffalone, and Polly Raguimov	October 22, 2025
Robert starts his first day at the Superhero Dispatch Network and meets the Z-Team.
3	"Turnover"	Dennis Lenart	Suzee Matson, Pierre Shorette, Mayanna Berrin, Ashley Jeffalone, Chad Rhiness, and Polly Raguimov	October 29, 2025
Robert is informed he needs to cut one member of the Z-Team.
4	"Restructure"	Nick Herman	Ashley Jeffalone, Mayanna Berrin, Suzee Matson, Chad Rhiness, Pierre Shorette, and Polly Raguimov	October 29, 2025
After cutting a member of the team, Robert has to deal with the consequences and choose a new member.
5	"Team Building"	Dennis Lenart and Chris Rebbert	Chad Rhiness, Mayanna Berrin, Suzee Matson, Pierre Shorette, Ashley Jeffalone, Polly Raguimov, and Chris Rebbert	November 5, 2025
After a long day of dispatching, the Z-Team unwind together at a villain bar.
6	"Moving Parts"	Chris Rebbert	Chad Rhiness, Pierre Shorette, Mayanna Berrin, Ashley Jeffalone, Suzee Matson, Polly Raguimov, and Chris Rebbert	November 5, 2025
Following a failed attempt to restore the Mecha Man suit, plans arise to help Robert find the missing component.
7	"Retrospective"	Nick Herman	Chris Rebbert, Pierre Shorette, Mayanna Berrin, Ashley Jeffalone, Suzee Matson, Polly Raguimov, and Chad Rhiness	November 12, 2025
Robert has the difficult decision to cut or keep a certain team member after an incident.
8	"Synergy"	Nick Herman and Dennis Lenart	Pierre Shorette, Mayanna Berrin, Chad Rhiness, Nick Herman, Ashley Jeffalone, Suzee Matson, and Polly Raguimov	November 12, 2025
Robert and the Z-Team have to deal with rising threats all across the city.

== Development ==
After their time with Telltale Games, then Ubisoft and Night School Studio, AdHoc Studio was formed in 2018 by Michael Choung, Nick Herman, Dennis Lenart, and Pierre Shorette. All four began development on their first project, Dispatch. Originally it was envisioned to be live-action, inspired by This Is SportsCenter commercials from ESPN, and was initially planned to start production in March 2020. However, due to the COVID-19 pandemic, development was shut down.

Around this time, the new incarnation of Telltale approached AdHoc to co-develop a sequel to The Wolf Among Us. Following the cancellation under the original Telltale, The Wolf Among Us 2 was announced in development in 2019. Both parties ran into creative differences; AdHoc in particular were frustrated of being treated like "work for hire" and lacking creative control over the project. Without direction from Telltale, AdHoc left and worked on a game idea for a few months before scrapping it and returned back to Dispatch. This time, they repurposed the project as animated instead of live-action, and shopped said project to multiple game studios until they landed a deal with an unnamed publisher for a year until they left mid-way development.

Seeking more funding, AdHoc announced a worldwide reveal of Dispatch with a trailer on December 12, 2024, during the Game Awards, alongside its ensemble cast. The game was developed using Unreal Engine 4.

AdHoc released a demo on May 29, 2025, to positive Steam reviews and was featured in the 2025 Tribeca Festival. AdHoc, now staffed with 30 employees, were under threat of closure due to lack of funding, and its founders avoided getting paychecks for six months straight to pay off their staff. By July 21, 2025, Critical Role Productions announced a partnership with AdHoc, namely to co-develop a game set in the Critical Role universe, and to finance the final stages of development for Dispatch.

On September 16, 2025, it was announced Dispatch would be released in weekly intervals beginning on October 22 and ending on November 12, 2025. A deluxe edition was also announced that would come with a digital artbook and four digital comics in addition to the main game. Versions for Nintendo Switch and Nintendo Switch 2 were announced in December 2025 for release on January 28, 2026. The Switch release comes with all eight episodes available from the beginning and runs at 720p resolution at 30 frames-per-second (FPS) on the console. A 'Nintendo Switch 2 Edition' is available as a free upgrade from the former console, and features an enhanced presentation at 1440p resolution and 60FPS. On July 2, 2026, Dispatch was made available on the cloud-based gaming service Amazon Luna. An Xbox Series X/S version was released on July 29, 2026.

On August 25, 2026, it was announced that physical copies of Dispatch would be released for Nintendo Switch and Switch 2, PlayStation 5, and Xbox Series X in late 2026.

On October 22, 2026, Android and iOS versions of the game were announced, scheduled to be released on December 9, 2026. The same day, AdHoc released an update for the game's deluxe edition celebrating the game's one-year anniversary. The update included cast and crew commentary tracks and a storyboard mode showing the early versions of the game's cutscenes.

== Reception ==
=== Critical reception ===
Reception

Aggregate scores
Aggregator	Score
Metacritic	(PC) 87/100 (Note: Score based on 70 critic reviews) (PS5) 89/100 (Note: Score based on 31 critic reviews) (NS2) 85/100 (Note: Score based on 8 critic reviews)
OpenCritic	97% recommend (Note: Based on 120 reviews)

Review scores
Publication	Score
Game Informer	9/10
Gamekult	8/10
GameSpot	8/10
IGN	9/10
Nintendo Life	9/10
PC Gamer (US)	8.9/10
Push Square	8/10

Dispatch received "generally favorable" reviews according to review aggregator website Metacritic. OpenCritic reported that 97% of critics recommended it.

Game Informer's Ben Reeves praised the narrative and choices. Gamekult's Kelmazad enjoyed the art, gameplay, writing, and cast, but noted the jokes were becoming tired. GameSpot's Jordan Ramée enjoyed the writing, visuals, acting, and challenge, but noted a lack of narrative consequence. IGN's Sarah Thwaites praised the writing and cast, but felt a lack of thrill with the hacking mini-games. PC Gamer's Fraser Brown lauded the characters and writing, but wished for more interactivity. Push Square's Robert Ramsey enjoyed the writing, characters, choices, and soundtrack, but felt the quick time events were lacking. Nintendo Life's Jim Norman reviewed the Nintendo Switch 2 port; praising the writing, acting, and animation, but described the gameplay as lacking and found the port's censorship strange.

=== Sales ===
Dispatch sold over one million units within the first ten days of release and two million units within the first month. According to AdHoc Studio, it was on course to beat their three-year sales target in just three months. It has sold over five million copies.

=== Accolades ===
Awards and nominations for Dispatch
Year	Award	Category	Result	Ref.
2025	The Game Awards 2025	Best Debut Indie Game	Nominated	
2025	The Game Awards 2025	Players' Voice	Nominated	
2026	The Steam Awards 2025	Game of the Year	Nominated	
2026	The Steam Awards 2025	Outstanding Story-Rich Game	Won	
2026	29th Annual D.I.C.E. Awards	Game of the Year	Nominated	
2026	29th Annual D.I.C.E. Awards	Adventure Game of the Year	Nominated	
2026	29th Annual D.I.C.E. Awards	Outstanding Achievement for an Independent Game	Nominated	
2026	29th Annual D.I.C.E. Awards	Outstanding Achievement in Art Direction	Nominated	
2026	29th Annual D.I.C.E. Awards	Outstanding Achievement in Character (Courtney/Invisigal)	Nominated	
2026	29th Annual D.I.C.E. Awards	Outstanding Achievement in Character (Robert Robertson III/Mecha Man)	Nominated	
2026	73rd Golden Reel Awards	Outstanding Achievement in Sound Editing – Game Effects / Foley	Nominated	
2026	NAVGTR Awards	Character Design	Nominated	
2026	NAVGTR Awards	Direction in a Game Cinema	Nominated	
2026	NAVGTR Awards	Original Adventure Game	Won	
2026	NAVGTR Awards	Lead Performance in a Comedy (Aaron Paul as Robert Robertson)	Won	
2026	NAVGTR Awards	Supporting Performance in a Comedy (Laura Bailey as Invisigal)	Nominated	
2026	NAVGTR Awards	Supporting Performance in a Comedy (Matthew Mercer as Shroud)	Won	
2026	NAVGTR Awards	Supporting Performance in a Comedy (Thot Squad as Prism)	Nominated	
2026	NAVGTR Awards	Writing in a Comedy	Won	
2026	7th Pégases Awards	Best International Game	Nominated	
2026	7th Pégases Awards	Best International Indie Game	Nominated	
2026	26th Game Developers Choice Awards	Best Debut	Nominated	
2026	26th Game Developers Choice Awards	Best Narrative	Nominated	
2026	26th Game Developers Choice Awards	Social Impact	Nominated	
2026	22nd British Academy Games Awards	Best Game	Nominated	
2026	22nd British Academy Games Awards	Animation	Won	
2026	22nd British Academy Games Awards	Artistic Achievement	Nominated	
2026	22nd British Academy Games Awards	Audio Achievement	Won	
2026	22nd British Academy Games Awards	Debut Game	Nominated	
2026	22nd British Academy Games Awards	Music	Nominated	
2026	22nd British Academy Games Awards	Narrative	Longlisted	
2026	22nd British Academy Games Awards	New Intellectual Property	Nominated	
2026	22nd British Academy Games Awards	Performer in a Leading Role (Aaron Paul as Robert Robertson)	Nominated	
2026	22nd British Academy Games Awards	Performer in a Leading Role (Laura Bailey as Invisigal)	Longlisted	
2026	22nd British Academy Games Awards	Performer in a Supporting Role (Jeffrey Wright as Chase)	Won	
2026	Nebula Awards	Best Game Writing	Nominated	
2026	Hugo Awards	Best Game or Interactive Work	Nominated	
2026	Develop:Star Awards 2026	Best Game	Nominated	
2026	Develop:Star Awards 2026	Best Visual Art	Nominated	
2026	Develop:Star Awards 2026	Best Narrative	Nominated	
2026	Develop:Star Awards 2026	Best Original IP	Nominated	
2026	Develop:Star Awards 2026	Best Marketing Campaign	Won	
2026	44th Golden Joystick Awards	Ultimate Game of the Year	Nominated	
2026	44th Golden Joystick Awards	Best Lead Performer (Aaron Paul as Robert Robertson III)	Nominated	
2026	44th Golden Joystick Awards	Best Soundtrack	Won	
2026	44th Golden Joystick Awards	Best Storytelling	Won	
2026	World Soundtrack Awards	Game Music Award (Andrew Arcadi)	Nominated	

== Controversies ==
=== Censorship on the Nintendo Switch version ===
In December 2025, it was revealed that the artwork for Dispatch's Digital Deluxe Edition on the Nintendo eShop had been altered from its original PlayStation 5 and Windows designs. The changed artwork featured new altered swimsuits worn by the game's characters to appear more modest in nature. This raised concerns about an incoming potential censorship in the game itself among players. When asked about the changed artwork, AdHoc Studio replied that they "could not comment on the topic at (that) time".

Upon the game's launch on the Nintendo eShop on January 28, 2026, players reported that certain scenes in the game featuring nudity, sexual content and crude gestures had been censored by default and could not be disabled, which was previously an optional toggle in the game's PlayStation 5 and Windows versions. In response, AdHoc Studio claimed that the Switch ports were censored "due to Nintendo's content criteria" and claimed that the "core gameplay and narrative experience remain(ed) identical to the original release".

However in a later response, Nintendo stated that while they require third party titles to carry ratings from independent rating organizations and to meet Nintendo's platform guidelines, they do not change the game's content itself. Regardless, there were reports of a large number of dissatisfied players requesting refunds for their copies on the eShop, with some claiming that the censorship was not previously disclosed by AdHoc to people pre-ordering the game.

Following player backlash and reports of mass-refunds, AdHoc issued an apology stating that "people (had) a right to be pissed [sic]" and that they "had lots to learn". However, they claimed that they did not intend to hide the port's censorship from the players. They further confirmed that they were working with Nintendo on a path forward, with plans for an update to "address at least some of the censored content". They also admitted that they initially assumed the game would be allowed uncensored on the Switch platform, similar to CD Projekt Red's The Witcher 3: Wild Hunt and Cyberpunk 2077.

On February 2, 2026, AdHoc confirmed that an uncensored physical release would not be possible on Nintendo systems. However, they were unable to explain why different SKUs could not be made for an international version similar to The Witcher 3 and Cyberpunk, citing legal reasons. On February 15, 2026, AdHoc reportedly reverted one of the censored materials in the game in an attempt to resolve the issue. They once again reiterated in March 2026 that they were still working with Nintendo to revert the port's censorship, while confirming that the game's Xbox Series X/S release to be the same uncensored version to that of the original PlayStation 5 and Windows ports.

==== HR Violations update ====
On June 17, 2026, AdHoc rolled out a feature update dubbed HR Violations for all available platforms that mostly focused on reverting or altering some of the previously censored material in the game's Switch version, namely nudity and crude gestures. The content affected by this update vary based on the player's region. The update added optional censorship options. It was released as a free additional DLC on the Nintendo eShop and as a free update for the PC and PlayStation 5 ports. The Xbox version was also confirmed to launch with this update included.

Dispatch co-director Nick Herman issued a statement alongside the update, stating that due to time and budget shortage, AdHoc could initially only make one censored build for the Switch port as Nintendo required "some level of censoring in all regions". He further apologized on the studio's behalf for not disclosing said censorship details in the advertising or promotional material prior to the Switch release.

=== Alleged depiction of non-consensual romance ===
Upon the release of episodes 7 and 8 on November 12, 2025, some players claimed that a key scene in episode 7 involving Robert Robertson and Invisigal allegedly depicted a non-consensual romantic advance on Robert. In said scene, Invisigal initiates a kiss with Robert without his consent. According to Game Rant, many players who preferred a romance route with Blonde Blazer likened the kissing scene to "a sort of forced romance."

On November 19, 2025, AdHoc Studio put out patch 1.0.16409 that addressed the issue. Official patch notes from the developers read "conditional outcome tuning to balance character relationships in episodes 7 & 8". This meant that unless certain criteria were met for the romantic encounter with Invisigal following this update, the kissing scene would not play for most players. The update was received positively by players, who felt that the original conditions needed to play the scene felt inadequate and inappropriate.

== Future ==
In July 2025, Critical Role Productions announced a partnership with AdHoc Studio for Dispatch merchandise, tabletop gaming, and an animated series.

In November 2025, AdHoc Studio co-founders Nick Herman and Pierre Shorette mentioned that they were considering a potential second season of Dispatch following the sales and reception of the game. Aaron Paul expressed enthusiasm to do more seasons of Dispatch while speaking to co-star Charles White.

In May 2026, Nick Herman said that he was interested in "developing characters and stories from the game's universe", and that the team was planning on taking the franchise further, hinting at a potential universe set by Dispatch. According to him, "There is a lot of opportunity and many characters that we want to continue exploring."
