= Get Jiro =

American adult animated action television series

- Genre: Action; Black comedy; Crime; Drama; Post-apocalyptic; Psychological thriller
- Based on: Get Jiro! and Get Jiro: Blood and Sushi by: Anthony Bourdain; and Joel Rose
- Developed by: Brian Gatewood; Alessandro Tanaka
- Voices of: Brian Tee; Seychelle Gabriel; Tessa Inez; Alison Pill; Courtney Taylor; Titus Welliver
- Music by: Stuart Roslyn
- Ending theme: "Get Jiro!" by Stuart Roslyn
- Country of origin: United States
- Original languages: English; Japanese (Note: The sixth episode of the series is a flashback set in Japan that's entirely spoken in the country's native language.)
- No. of seasons: 1
- No. of episodes: 8

Production
- Executive producers: Brian Gatewood; Alessandro Tanaka; Jordan Blum; Anthony Bourdain (Note: Posthumous credit); Joel Rose; Sam Register
- Producer: Joann Estoesta
- Editors: David Courter; Cris Mertens
- Running time: 21–22 minutes
- Production companies: Multiverse Cowboy; G&T Productions; Warner Bros. Animation; DC Studios

Original release
- Network: Adult Swim
- Release: October 4, 2026 – present

Get Jiro (stylized and marketed in all caps) is an American adult animated action-thriller television series developed by Brian Gatewood and Alessandro Tanaka based on the 2012 graphic novel Get Jiro! and its 2015 prequel Get Jiro: Blood and Sushi, written by Anthony Bourdain and Joel Rose, illustrated by Langdon Foss (Note: Illustrator, Get Jiro!) and Alé Garza (Note: Interior illustrator, Get Jiro: Blood and Sushi) and published by DC Comics under its Vertigo imprint. The series premiered on October 4, 2026, (Note: The series was listed as premiering on October 3, 2026, at midnight (24:00) EDT/PDT, which is effectively October 4.) in the United States on Adult Swim's Toonami programming block, with each episode releasing on HBO Max shortly after broadcast.

== Premise ==
Set in a post-apocalyptic, near-future Los Angeles after an event known as "The Great Unraveling." The economy collapsed and order was shattered in a world where nearly anything could be acquired and enjoyed virtually, from money to travel and even sex. Anything except food. With food necessary for human survival and good food harder to come by, chefs became the new power in the world, culinary culture reigns supreme, and people are literally willing to kill for their next meal. It is in this world that a Japanese sushi chef named Jiro has opened up a shop in a strip mall in LA, and cut off the head of a man who did not properly appreciate his sushi. This one violent act catches the attention of two of the biggest chefs in LA, who seek to get Jiro on their side, or to kill him so the other cannot have him, all while Jiro is quietly cooking up something much bigger than a meal.

== Characters ==
- Jiro (voiced by Brian Tee) is a mysterious sushi chef from Japan who opened up a small sushi restaurant in a strip mall in the Outer Ring of LA. He seeks to destroy the empires of Bob and Rose for personal reasons.
- Maria Guerrero (voiced by Seychelle Gabriel) is a Mexican restaurant owner in the same shopping center as Jiro. After Bob's goons burn down her establishment, Jiro gives her a used food truck to get back in business.
- Cam Guerrero (voiced by Tessa Inez) is Maria's little sister, interested in the "secret" behind Jiro's sushi. Jiro later takes her on as an apprentice.
- Rose (voiced by Alison Pill) is the chef-owner of "The Farm" and Bob's biggest rival. She runs her own vertical hydroponic farms out of abandoned apartment and office towers and sources her own produce for her vegan restaurants, though she herself is secretly not vegan, seeing it as a way to avoid Bob's goons destroying her supply chains.
- Cynda Lynn (voiced by Courtney Taylor) is an investigator with the "City of Angels Health Department" (CAHD), trying to keep the peace between competing factions of chefs while looking for a legal way to take down Bob.
- Bob (voiced by Titus Welliver) is the chef-owner of "The Summit," LA's premier dining establishment in the Inner Ring. Bob and his subordinate chefs rule LA's dining scene with an iron fist, and Bob cares less about quality of food than quantity, squeezing all the money he can out of everyone and making sure his restaurants and distributors are the only ones in town.
- Deputy Chief Cromwell (voiced by Chi McBride) is Cynda's superior at the CAHD, and the officer who found her as a child after raiders slaughtered her family. He treats Cynda like a daughter.
- Alister Attenborough (voiced by Justin Kirk) is a major food critic in LA, and a fan of Jiro's work.
- Ichigo (voiced by Eugene Nomura) is Jiro's older brother, a ruthless, violently unhinged Yakuza leader, and the reason for Jiro's escape to LA.

== Episodes ==
No.	Title	Directed by	Written by	Original release date
1	"Pilot"	Sam Liu	Brian Gatewood & Alessandro Tanaka	October 4, 2026
In a resource-scarce, dystopian future Los Angeles, food is the ultimate currency, and master chefs rule like brutal mob kingpins. The city is segregated into class-based sectors, with the lawless Outer Ring serving as home to Jiro, a stoic and exceptionally skilled sushi chef who operates out of a modest strip mall restaurant. Jiro's quiet dedication to the flawless art of omakase is interrupted when a sniveling, entitled customer offends his strict culinary standards by dipping his meal into the soy sauce when directed not to. Jiro flawlessly decapitates the man with his kitchen blade as punishment. This gruesome display of culinary violence barely registers with local health department, who do not enforce laws in the Outer Ring, but it sends shockwaves through the upper echelons of the city's food empire back inside the Inner Ring. Jiro's skills quickly attracts the immediate attention of the city's two dominant, rival chef warlords: Bob, an unprincipled practitioner of globalized haute cuisine, and Rose, an extreme eco-friendly locavore, who attempt to entice Jiro to join their factions and best their competitor. By initially refusing to compromise on his craft and pick a side, Jiro ignites a bloody turf war between these two chefs.
2	"Meat Is Murder"	Milo Neuman	Brian Gatewood & Alessandro Tanaka	October 4, 2026
Jiro chooses to join Rose's faction and take down Bob. After kidnapping Bob's top food scientist and getting him to divulge the recipe to Mother, a gelatinous substance able to mimic the flavor of any food it touches, Rose sends Jiro and her partner, Freddie, on a treacherous, high-stakes delivery mission that takes them across the fragmented rings of the metropolis to deliver the substance to the Inner Ring's food festival. This cross-city journey quickly turns into a deadly gauntlet as Jiro and Freddie are ruthlessly hunted down by rogue food truck bounty hunters who are enticed by Bob's reward for eliminating them. Jiro battles the bounty hunters and manages to escape their onslaught right after Freddie gets pierced in the throat by one of the hunters. They arrive just in time for Rose to introduce Mother to the public. After serving the attendees the substance, however, it becomes apparent that the food is poisoned. It is quickly revealed that Jiro betrayed Rose and was co-conspiring with Bob all along to ruin her reputation, as he believes Bob's methods of cooking to be more genuine. Later in a hospital, Freddie is finally able to speak to Rose, demanding that she "get Jiro".
3	"The Ortolan"	Vinton Heuck	Jordan Blum	October 11, 2026
Jiro accepts Bob's offer to be the centerpiece of a new food hall in the Middle Ring. Bob sets up a demo for some Los Angeles city councilmen and a highly respected food critic named Alistair. However, an assassin pâtissier hired by Rose tries to kill Bob and Jiro. Though she is unable to kill either men, the attempt is enough to scare off Bob's investors and local legislators from finishing construction. Jiro suggests to Bob that he be allowed to cook a "perfect meal" in his name to convince everyone to come back to Bob's side, using an endangered bird called the ortolan. Meanwhile, Cynda is struggling to find hard evidence against Jiro or Bob that will let the health department shut them down, as Cam feels like Jiro betrayed her by accepting the offer to work with Bob. The following night, Jiro visits French chef Jean-Claude to teach him how to make ortolan. Jean-Claude is annoyed at the last-minute request, but relents. The following day, Jiro serves the ortolan to Bob's guests, while Bob himself fights off the returning pâtissier. Jiro rushes to Bob's side and finds that he survived the assassination attempt. However, the two chefs return to the room to discover that someone beheaded all of the guests and left a message from Rose in their blood. The following night, Jiro tells Cam in metaphor that this is all part of his plan, as it's revealed in flashbacks that Jiro beheaded all of the guests and wrote the message in blood in Rose's name.
4	"Secret Sauce"	Sam Liu	Huong Nguyen & Kevin Rosen	October 18, 2026
Bob and Rose start openly going to war with each other in the streets of Los Angeles. Cynda, frustrated at a lack of progress in her case and with the federal Alcohol Firearms and Food (AFF) Department muscling in, decides to arrest Jiro herself. Cynda takes Jiro to Pig-EZ, a BBQ restaurant that her family used to own before they were gunned down by raiders and their family's secret sauce was stolen and later turned into inferior copies. Cynda managed to save one sauce bottle from that day and shares it with Jiro, who starts guessing the ingredients in it, and the two slowly learn about each other. Meanwhile, the city's elites lock Bob and Rose inside a kitchen at a party to force them to come to a truce, as collateral damage from their war is costing the Inner Ring money. Bob and Rose soon realize that Jiro pitted them both against each other, and agree to kill him together. Later, Cynda escorts Jiro to an AFF safehouse, but the AFF agents were paid off by Bob to kill Jiro. The two manage to fight off their attackers, but Jiro is wounded in his left arm and leg. Cynda lets Jiro go free after telling him the last ingredient in her family's secret sauce.
5	"Pressure Cooker"	Milo Neuman	Huong Nguyen	October 25, 2026
Jiro collapses from his wounds but is patched up by Maria, who reveals she's fleeing to Las Vegas with Cam, and offers to take Jiro with her. However, Jiro refuses to leave without his special knife. As Maria and Cam reluctantly leave the area, Jiro tries to enter his restaurant, currently occupied by Bob's goons led by a white otaku named Mr. Madison. Madison offers Jiro his knife back in exchange for a perfect Tokyo style meal. Jiro puts together five different nigiri for Madison, who catches that the fifth contains poisonous fugu fish before he eats it. However, he suddenly chokes to death on tetrodotoxin, as Jiro reveals that he actually slipped a little fugu into all of the previous nigiri as well. Despite killing Madison, Jiro is still outnumbered by Bob's chefs who are fine with killing him, until Maria throws a makeshift bomb into the restaurant. She then reveals that Cam convinced her to turn around and fight back against Bob's forces by rallying all of the neighborhood chefs and friends. However, Bob calls in reinforcements and their numbers overwhelm the locals. Jiro decides to turn himself in to Bob to save the others, giving Cam his knife. Soon after, Bob and Rose prepare to kill Jiro in one of Bob's kitchens, when they discover that Jiro has a yakuza style irezumi tattoo on his back. But before they can discover why, Cynda storms in with CAHD officers to arrest Jiro, keeping him alive for the time being.
6	"Tokyo Story"	Vinton Heuck	Joel Rose	November 1, 2026
Sometime in the past, Jiro tried to live a double life in Tokyo, apprenticing under an old sushi chef while being the second in line of the leadership of a yakuza family, below his ill-tempered older brother, Ichigo. In addition, he regularly visited a half-Italian, half-Japanese chef named Miyako who ran a usually empty Italian restaurant in Tokyo that functioned as a front to launder the family's money. The Oyabun of the family, Jiro's father, told Jiro that he'll have to choose between being a chef or a yakuza. Jiro reluctantly cut ties with the sushi chef, who gave him a special knife from the Kamakura period, and with Miyako, who gave him a bite of her perfected pasta. However, when Jiro returned home, his father told him that he will make Jiro the successor, as Ichigo's actions have become too extreme. Ichigo overheard his father's plans, and killed his father in retaliation, using Jiro's gifted knife to frame him for the murder. Jiro took the knife and fled, hoping to escape the country with Miyako, but the other yakuza members pursued him and kidnapped Miyako. Jiro was able to fight them off, but his actions led to Miyako's death before he jumped on the plane, and later ended up in LA. In the present, Jiro sits in a prison cell, awaiting his fate.
7	"Cage Free"	Sam Liu	Jordan Blum	November 8, 2026
In Butchers Block Prison, Jiro refuses to divulge any more information to Cynda, who leaves him in his cell. However, he is soon visited by Alistair, who stole a guard's uniform to break Jiro out of the prison, but Jiro refuses to leave until he finishes making his ramen in the prison kitchen. The Warden quickly catches on to his scheme through his panopticon, and sends several armored guards with shock prods after him. Despite Alistair's insistence that they leave now, Jiro focuses on finishing his ramen, stopping only to eliminate the guards and then the other prisoners the Warden sends through the kitchen. Eventually, Jiro makes his way through the Chef's Block of the prison and gives Jean-Claude, the French chef who taught him to make Ortolan, sips of the ramen broth before he dies. Jiro and Alistair make their way towards the exit and eliminate the Warden and his escorts before escaping. However, Alistair locks Jiro in the back of his van, and fills it with knockout gas. As Alistair drives away, he tells an unconscious Jiro, "you're about to cook the meal of your life."
8	"Your Guests Have Arrived"	Milo Neuman	Morgan Collins	November 15, 2026
Jiro wakes up on the defunct set of Alistair's last cooking show, where Alistair reveals his true intention of breaking Jiro out, to get him to cook human flesh from the bodies collected as "The Cannibal," as normal food no longer excites him anymore. In addition, he gave both himself and Jiro coffee made from a mushroom that will kill them in six hours if left untreated. Meanwhile, Bob and Rose try to bargain with Ichigo as he comes to visit LA, that they will hand over Jiro to him in exchange for expanding Bob's restaurant empire into Japan. However, Ichigo proves to be more ruthless, buying off Bob's chefs and cutting out Bob's tongue when he refuses to sign Ichigo's deal. At CAHD HQ, Chief Cromwell convinces Cynda to join him for lunch at The Summit. Cynda sneaks off to the host's stand and discovers that Cromwell has actually been a frequent guest at Bob's restaurant. Jiro serves Alistair a consommé from his ingredients. As Alistair breaks down from living up to his Cannibal nickname, Jiro reveals the consommé was actually made with beef he found in the freezer. Alistair then leaves him with a nice review of his dish and the antidote. Back at The Summit, Rose shoves Bob out of his office window, having taken Ichigo's offer herself. As Cynda drives Cromwell back to their HQ, Cromwell admits to having worked with Bob, and offers Cynda a contract off the books. When she refuses, Cromwell tries to silence her, but Cynda kills him with a broken sauce bottle. Jiro returns to the Outer Ring, telling Cam he's preparing a new recipe.
9	"Our Specials This Evening"	Vinton Heuck	Jordan Blum	November 22, 2026
10	"Gochisousama"	TBA	TBA	November 29, 2026

== Production ==
The series was first announced by Warner Bros. Animation and Adult Swim at the Annecy International Animation Film Festival in June 2023. The series was previewed as a work-in-progress at the same event two years later in June 2025.
