= Zack Fox =

American comedian, rapper and actor (born 1990)

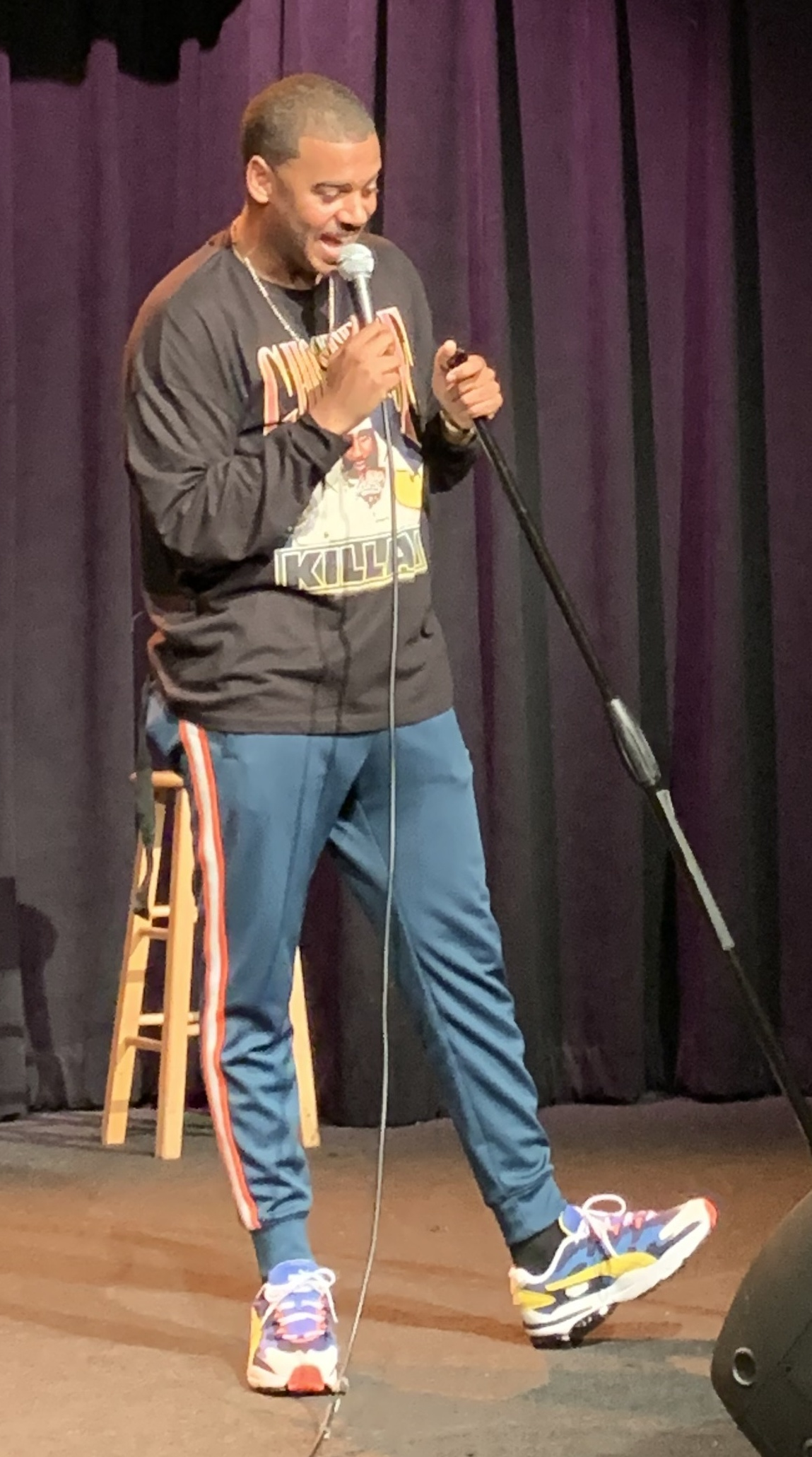
- Fox performing stand-up in July 2019
- Born: Zachary Channing Fox; December 6, 1990 (age 35); Arlington, Virginia, U.S.
- Other name: Breastmilk Alabama
- Education: Savannah College of Art and Design
- Spouse: Kat Matutina (m. 2024)

Comedy career
- Years active: 2013–present
- Medium: Stand up; music; television

Zachary Channing Fox (born December 6, 1990) is an American stand-up comedian, rapper, actor, DJ, and internet personality from Atlanta, Georgia. He has collaborated with Kenny Beats, Flying Lotus, Thundercat, Doechii, and Bnyx. He describes his genre of art as "Shemar-Core," a term that likely references actor Shemar Moore, who serves as an artistic muse for Fox.

== Career ==
Fox got his start in 2013 on Twitter, tweeting jokes and amassing tens of thousands of followers under the alias "Bootymath." In subsequent years, he dropped the alias and expanded into music, joining the Awful Records collective. In 2017, his publicity increased as he illustrated the album sleeve of Thundercat's album Drunk, and also acted in and wrote for Kuso, the 2017 horror comedy film directed by Flying Lotus.

In October 2018, Fox released his first song, "Square Up" in collaboration with hip-hop producer Kenny Beats.

In April 2019, Fox appeared on The Cave, a YouTube series in which Kenny Beats invites different artists to freestyle in his studio. Kenny and Fox recorded "Jesus Is the One (I Got Depression)," in the episode, and the song reached the number one spot on Spotify's U.S. viral chart on July 8, 2019. The two never intended to release the song commercially, but after its success they released an official version of it in June.

His 2019 single "The Bean Kicked In" is featured on FlyLo FM, a fictional radio station in Grand Theft Auto V hosted by record producer Flying Lotus. In 2020, as a response to Gal Gadot's controversial "Imagine" video with her friends, Fox released a cover of "Slob on My Knob" by the Tear da Club Up Thugs, inviting several rappers and black personalities for the cover.

On October 15, 2021, Zack Fox released his debut studio album, Shut the Fuck Up Talking to Me.

== Personal life ==
Fox started dating chef and entrepreneur Kat Matutina in 2018. They got engaged in March 2022, and married on November 9, 2024. The couple resides in Los Angeles and have a radio show together on NTS Radio.

== Filmography ==
=== Film ===
Year	Title	Role	Notes
2017	Kuso	Manuel	Also co-writer
2025	Lurker	Swett	
2026	The Wrong Girls	Josh	

=== Television ===
Year	Title	Role	Notes
2020	The Eric Andre Show	Himself	Episode: "Named After My Dad's Penis"
2021	Pause with Sam Jay	Party guest	Episode: "Coons"
2021–present	Abbott Elementary	Tariq	Recurring role
2022	Bust Down	Bishop BJ Burger	Episode: "Beige Rage"
2023	Neon	Zale	Episode: "Art Basel"
2025	The Vince Staples Show	Himself	Episode: "Anti-Social"

=== Music videos ===
Year	Title	Role	Performer
2019	"Square Up"	Himself	Zack Fox, Kenny Beats
2019	"The Bean Kicked In"	Himself	Zack Fox
2020	"Stick!"	Himself	Zack Fox, Fabo
2025	"Denial Is a River"	Old Dude from 2019	Doechii

== Discography ==
=== Studio albums ===
Title	Details
Shut the Fuck Up Talking to Me	Released: October 15, 2021; Label: Parasang; Format: Digital download, streaming

=== Extended plays ===
Title	Details
Wood Tip	Released: December 16, 2022; Label: Parasang; Format: Digital download, streaming

=== Singles ===
Title	Year	Certifications	Album
"Square Up" (with Kenny Beats)	2018		non-album singles
"Jesus Is the One (I Got Depression)" (with Kenny Beats)	2019	RIAA: Gold	non-album singles
"The Bean Kicked in"	2019		non-album singles
"Stick!" (featuring Fabo)	2020		non-album singles
"The Madness" (with Working on Dying and Father)	2020		non-album singles
"IHY2LN"	2020		non-album singles
"Marinate"	2020		non-album singles
"Fafo"	2021		Shut the Fuck Up Talking to Me
"Dummy"	2023		non-album singles
"Woa!" (with Zelooperz)	2024		non-album singles

=== Guest appearances ===
Title	Year	Artist(s)	Album
"Crashed My Car"	2020	Hook, Nedarb	Crashed My Car
