= Neon (TV series) =

- Official promotional poster
- Genre: Comedy
- Created by: Shea Serrano; Max Searle
- Starring: Tyler Dean Flores; Emma Ferreira; Jordan Mendoza; Courtney Taylor
- Country of origin: United States
- Original language: English
- No. of seasons: 1
- No. of episodes: 8

Production
- Executive producers: Shea Serrano; Max Searle; Scooter Braun; Scott Manson; James Shin; Kyle Vinuya; Daddy Yankee
- Running time: 30 minutes
- Production company: SB Projects

Original release
- Network: Netflix
- Release: October 19, 2023

Neon is an American comedy television series created by Shea Serrano and Max Searle for Netflix. The series follows a trio of friends that move to Miami to pursue a reggaeton career. Neon stars Tyler Dean Flores, Emma Ferreira, Jordan Mendoza, and Courtney Taylor. It was released on October 19, 2023.

== Plot ==
Santi, a Generation Z reggaeton artist, and his two best friends Vanessa and Felix move to Miami to help his music career take off.

== Cast and characters ==
- Tyler Dean Flores as Santi, an aspiring reggaeton artist from Fort Myers, Florida
- Emma Ferreira as Vanessa or Ness, Santi's best friend and music manager
- Jordan Mendoza as Felix, Santi's best friend, artistic director and social media manager
- Courtney Taylor as Mia, a record label representative courting Santi to sign a contract
- Genesis Rodriguez as Isa, a Cuban-American pop star
- Jhayco as Javier, a successful reggaeton star
- Santiago Cabrera as Mia's boss and a record label executive
- Alycia Pascual-Peña as Celeste, a music critic
- Jordana Brewster as Gina, a wealthy investor
- Daddy Yankee, Scooter Braun, Ken-Y, Jon Z, Villano Antillano and Jota Rosa appear as themselves

== Episodes ==
No.	Title	Directed by	Written by	Original release date
1	"The Dream"	Oz Rodriguez	Shea Serrano & Max Searle	October 19, 2023
2	"Opening Up"	Eli Gonda	Max Searle	October 19, 2023
3	"Forbidden Fruta"	Eli Gonda	Demi Adejuyigbe	October 19, 2023
4	"Art Basel"	Eli Gonda	Brianna Porter & Christopher Eddins	October 19, 2023
5	"Corillo"	Kimberly McCullough	Wally Baram	October 19, 2023
6	"Isanti"	Steven Canals	Raina Morris	October 19, 2023
7	"New Management"	Kimberly McCullough	Adriana Caballero	October 19, 2023
8	"The Reality"	Steven Canals	Jordan Mendoza	October 19, 2023

== Production ==
Neon was created by Shea Serrano and Max Searle, and received a series order from Netflix on November 8, 2022. The series is executive produced by Scooter Braun’s production company SB Projects with Scott Manson, James Shin, and Kyle Vinuya as co-executive producer.

After the show was announced, Hyperallergic critiqued the series, which focuses on the Caribbean genre of reggaeton, for its lack of Puerto Rican producers. After its release, it was noted that Daddy Yankee was added as an executive producer and guest star for the series. The executive music producers are Tainy, Lex Borrero, and Ivan Rodriguez, collectively known as Tainy & One Six.

All eight episodes were released on Netflix on October 19, 2023.

== Reception ==
In a positive review for Variety, Aramide Tinubu wrote, "Glossy and fun, the reggaeton-centered “Neon” puts the viewer in the mind of “Rap Sh!t” without the grit framing the Issa Rae-created show. It's a series about friendship, determination and the perils of the modern-day music industry." Kelly Lawler of USA Today reviewed Neon as 3.5/4 stars and described it as "funny, occasionally absurd and with a vision to match its glowing title." While The Hollywood Reporter's Angie Han praised Neon for "delivering an endless party set to danceable beats, and populated by characters worth giving a damn about" she also wrote, "Neon‘s glossy positivity limits its portrayal of the reggaeton world to the surface level. For all its gushing over its celebrity cameos, the series spends very little time exploring what makes the genre unique — why specifically it speaks to Santi, what sets this corner of the music industry apart from the ones chronicled in, say, Dave or Atlanta or The Idol or the similarly Miami-set but much grittier Rap Sh!t." In a less positive review, Cristina Escobar stated for RogerEbert.com, "“Neon” is a series of jokes, rhythms, and points with no guiding anchor. It's a lot of things, but excellent is not one of them. And that's a shame, especially as reggaeton continues its global dominance; we will need more shows and films depicting its particular culture and cadence."
