= Titus Welliver =

American actor (born 1962)

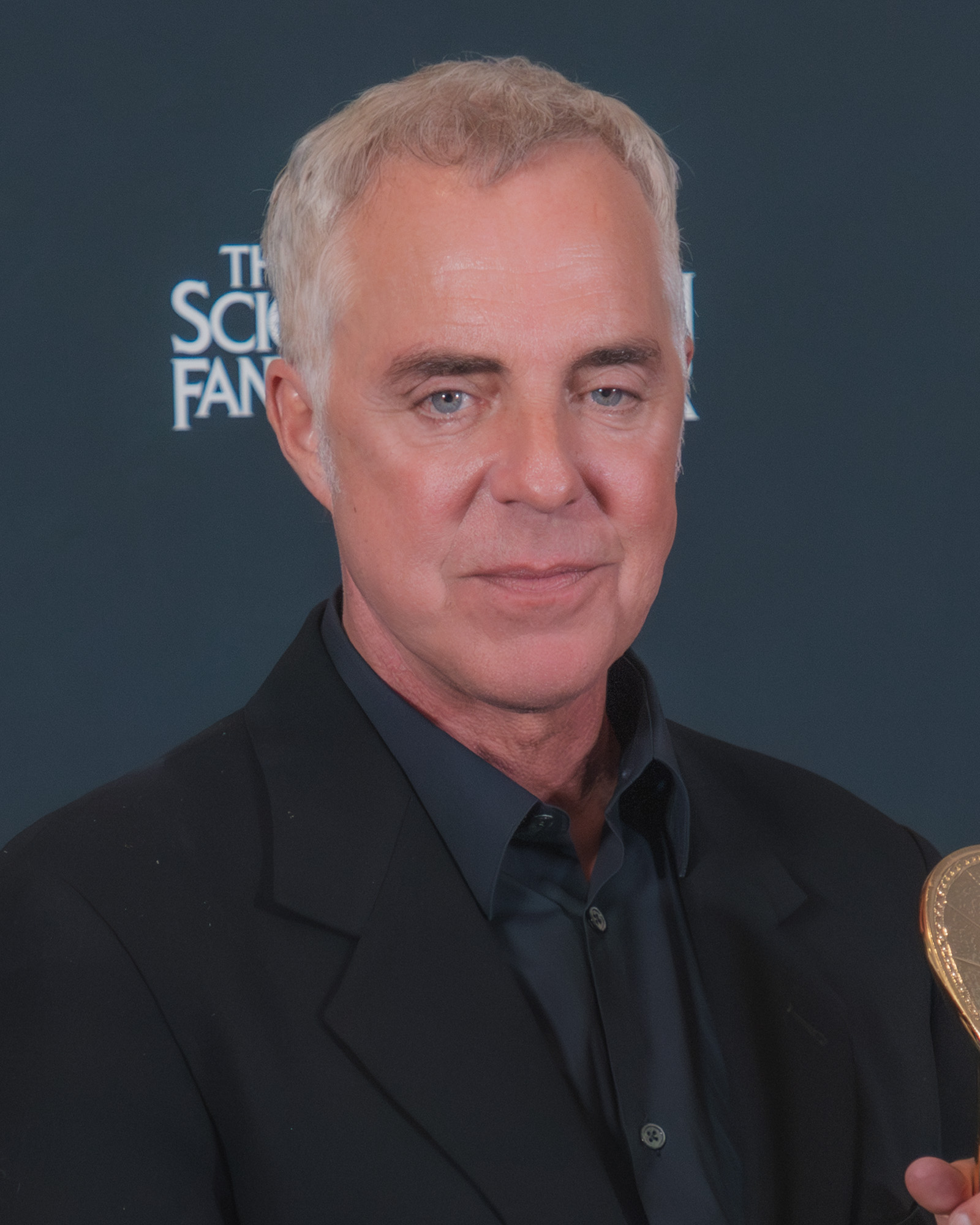
- Welliver in 2026
- Born: Titus B. Welliver; March 12, 1962 (age 64); New Haven, Connecticut, U.S.
- Occupation: Actor
- Years active: 1990–present
- Children: 3
- Relatives: Neil Welliver (father) Norma Cripps (mother)

Titus B. Welliver (born March 12, 1962) is an American actor. He is best known for his portrayals of the Man in Black in Lost (2009–2010), Silas Adams in Deadwood (2004–2006), Jimmy O'Phelan in Sons of Anarchy (2009–2010), and Harry Bosch in the television series Bosch (2014–2021), Bosch: Legacy (2022–2025) and Ballard (2025–). He is also known for his collaborations with Ben Affleck, starring in his films Gone Baby Gone (2007), The Town (2010), Argo (2012), and Live by Night (2016).

== Early life ==
Titus Welliver was born March 12, 1962 in New Haven, Connecticut, and was raised in Philadelphia and New York City, surrounded by poets and painters. His father, Neil Welliver, was a well-known American landscape painter who was a professor of fine art at Yale University before becoming dean of the University of Pennsylvania's Graduate School of Fine Art. His mother, Norma Cripps, was a fashion illustrator. Titus moved to New York in 1980 to learn his craft. He studied drama at New York University in the early 1980s before his film and television career began. He enrolled in classes at New York's HB Acting Studios while attending New York University. To support himself, he held a variety of jobs including bartender and construction worker.

== Career ==
=== Film ===
He has worked on several film projects, including The Doors (1991), Mobsters (1991), Mulholland Falls (1996), Rough Riders (1997), Once in the Life (2000), Biker Boyz (2003), Twisted (2004), Assault on Precinct 13 (2005). He was cast in the first four films of director Ben Affleck: Gone Baby Gone (2007), The Town (2010), Argo (2012), and Live by Night (2016). He was also cast in director Michael Bay's film Transformers: Age of Extinction in 2014.

=== Television ===
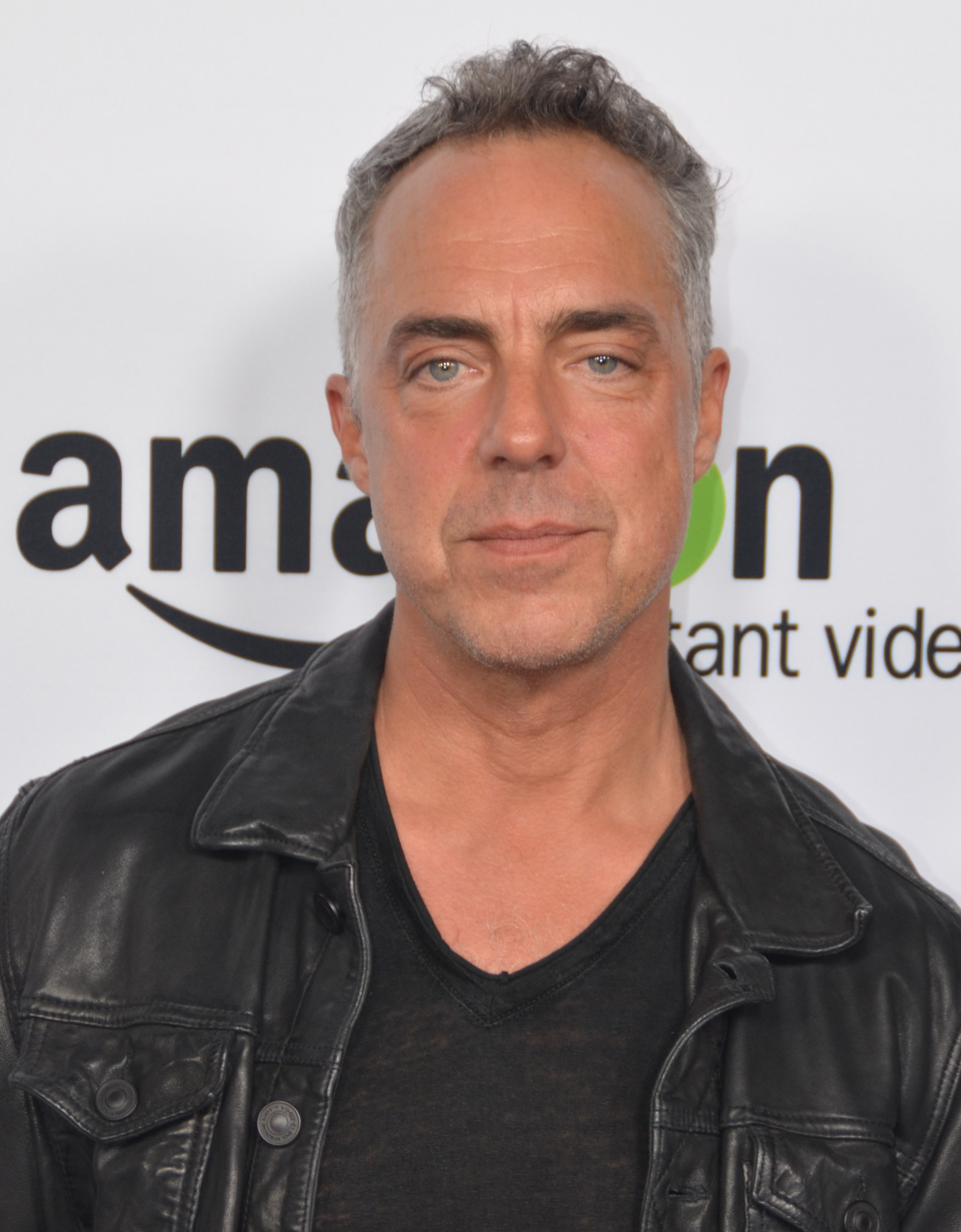
Welliver in 2015

On television, he had a recurring role as a doctor on NYPD Blue and was one of the stars of the CBS police drama Brooklyn South. Moreover, he is well known for playing the semi-regular character Silas Adams on the HBO series Deadwood. Welliver played Maxwell Burke in two episodes of Star Trek: Voyager, “Equinox, Part 1” and “Equinox, Part 2”. He played "The Representative" in two episodes of Prison Break, portrayed Kyle Hollis (a.k.a. Reverend Orson Parker) in the NBC series Life, and appeared in the season five finale of Lost as the "Man in Black", which he continued to portray during the sixth and final season. In 1999, he appeared in an episode of Touched by an Angel titled "The Occupant", where he played a man who was "occupied" by a demon. In 2002, he played Tom Landricks, a rapist, on Law & Order: Special Victims Unit.

He was introduced into FX's Sons of Anarchy midway through season two, in which he portrays Irish gun kingpin Jimmy O'Phelan. In 2009, he started playing the role of Prosecutor Glenn Childs, a rival of Chris Noth's character, in the CBS series The Good Wife. He joined the cast of the apocalyptic drama The Last Ship in a recurring role for its first two seasons, as Thorwald, a local warlord fighting underground in a dying world infected by a global pandemic.

He plays the title role in the TV series Bosch from Amazon Studios. The series is based on the novels centered on the character of the same name by Michael Connelly. The first season of the series was released on Amazon Prime Video on February 13, 2015. The series was renewed for a seventh and final season on February 13, 2020. The Bosch series was followed by a May 2022 spin-off entitled Bosch: Legacy in which Bosch has left the LAPD and has become a private detective and his daughter, Madeline (played by Madison Lintz), is a rookie police officer, still set in Los Angeles.

Outside of acting, Welliver appeared in the eighteenth season of Hell's Kitchen when he attended the fifth dinner service as one of the red team's diners.

He had a cameo appearance as an Imperial captain in the Disney+ series The Mandalorian.

=== Audiobooks ===
He has narrated several audiobooks, including Robert B. Parker's series of American western novels, Appaloosa, Brimstone, Blue-Eyed Devil and Ironhorse. He has also narrated several of the Michael Connelly Bosch series of crime fiction novels, including The Crossing, The Burning Room, Two Kinds of Truth and The Wrong Side of Goodbye.

== Painting ==
Welliver is the son of artist Neil Welliver and is an established painter himself. He is represented in New York by the Georges Bergès Gallery.

== Personal life ==
He has been married five times (with four ending in divorce and one ending due to death of his spouse). He has three children.

He revealed in several interviews the link between his own experience of loss and his interpretation of Harry Bosch.

== Filmography ==
=== Film ===
Year	Production	Role	Notes
1990	Navy SEALs	Redneck in Bar	
1991	The Doors	Macing Cop	
1991	Mobsters	Al Capone	
1992	An American Story	Jack Austin	
1994	Tick, Tick, Tick	Unknown	Short
1994	Zero Tolerance	Ray Manta	
1994	Blind Justice	Sumner	
1995	Born to Be Wild	Sergeant Markle	
1996	Mulholland Falls	Kenny Kamins, Mobster	
1997	The Clearing	Unknown	Short
1997	The Big Fall	Moe	
2000	Cement	Mo	
2000	Once in the Life	Torch	
2003	Biker Boyz	Max	
2004	Twisted	Dale Becker	
2005	Assault on Precinct 13	Milos	
2007	Gone Baby Gone	Lionel McCready	
2008	The Narrows	Tony	
2008	The Human Contract	Mr. Praylis	
2009	Other People's Parties	Pat “The Patriot” Prescott	
2009	Handsome Harry	Gebhardt	
2010	Mafia II	Civilians	Video game voice role
2010	The Town	Detective Dino Ciampa	
2012	Man on a Ledge	Captain Dante Marcus	
2012	Item 47	Agent Felix Blake	Short Marvel Comics film, precursor to Marvel's Agents of S.H.I.E.L.D. TV series.
2012	Argo	Jon Bates	
2012	Promised Land	Rob	
2013	Red 2	Senior Director of Military Intelligence	Uncredited
2014	Transformers: Age of Extinction	James Savoy	
2014	Poker Night	Maxwell	
2016	Live by Night	Tim Hickey	
2018	Escape Plan 2: Hades	Gregor Faust	
2019	An Affair to Die For	Russell	
2019	Shaft	Special Agent Vietti	
2021	Batman: The Long Halloween	Carmine Falcone	Voice, direct-to-video
2024	Watchmen	Rorschach / Walter Kovacs	Voice, direct-to-video
2025	Ricky	Leslie Torino	
2025	Abraham's Boys	Abraham Van Helsing	
2026	Killing Castro		

=== Television ===
Year	Production	Role	Notes
1990	Matlock	Johnny Bauer	Episode: "The Narc"
1990	The Lost Capone	Ralph Capone	Television movie
1992	L.A. Law	William Boyd	Episode: "Steal It Again, Sam"
1992	Beverly Hills, 90210	Doug	Episode: "Cardio-Funk"
1992	The Commish	Michael Harris	Episode: "Video Vigilante"
1993	Tales from the Crypt	Salucci	Episode: "Forever Ambergris"
1994	The X-Files	Doug Spinney	Episode: "Darkness Falls"
1994	One Woman's Courage		Television movie
1995	New York Undercover	Frankie	Episode: "Innocent Bystanders"
1995–1998	NYPD Blue	Dr. Mondzac	Recurring role; 8 episodes
1996	Kindred: The Embraced	Cameron	Episode: "Cabin in the Woods"
1996	High Incident	Sergeant Crispo	2 episodes
1996	Murder One	Larry White	3 episodes
1997	Nash Bridges	Richard Drake	Episode: "The Web"
1997	The Practice	Gordon	Episode: "Hide and Seek"
1997	Rough Riders	B.F. Goodrich	Miniseries
1997–1998	Brooklyn South	Officer Jake Lowery	Main role; 22 episodes
1998	The Day Lincoln Was Shot	Lewis Thornton Powell	Television movie
1998	Spy Game	Sebastian Dane	Episode: "Necessity Is the Mother of Infection"
1999	Total Recall 2070	Henry Sumers	Episode: "Personal Effects"
1999	Star Trek: Voyager	Lieutenant Maxwell Burke	Episode: Equinox Part 1 & 2
1999	Touched by an Angel	Gregory / Lonnie	Episode: "The Occupant"
1999	Mind Prey	John Mail	Television movie
2000	Falcone	Santino 'Sonny' Napoli	Episode: "Windows"
2001	Big Apple	FBI Special Agent Jimmy Flynn	8 episodes
2001	Blonde	The Baseball Player	Television miniseries
2001	UC: Undercover	Rick Jansen	Episode: "Kiss Tomorrow Goodbye"
2001–2002	That's Life	Dr. Eric Hackett	Recurring role; 17 episodes
2002	Third Watch	Cameron	Episode: "Ladies' Day"
2002	Law & Order: Special Victims Unit	Tom Landricks	Episode: "Resilience"
2003	The Twilight Zone	Dylan	Episode: "The Monsters Are on Maple Street"
2003	Hack	Zachary	2 episodes
2004–2006	Deadwood	Silas Adams	26 episodes
2006	Law & Order	Bill Whitney	Episode: "Profiteer"
2007	Numb3rs	Agent Graves	Episode: "Finders Keepers"
2007	Kidnapped	Senator Bill Ross	2 episodes
2007	Jericho	Colonel Robert Hoffman	Episode: "Why We Fight"
2007	NCIS	Navy Captain Roger Walsh	Episode: "Leap of Faith"
2007	Shark	Dexter Modene / Javier	Episode: "In Absentia"
2007–2008	Life	Kyle Hollis	2 episodes
2008	Prison Break	Representative Scott	2 episodes
2009	Monk	Daniel Reese	Episode: "Mr. Monk's Other Brother"
2009	Raising the Bar	Nate Chrisman	Episode: "No Child's Left Behind"
2009	Kings	Bartender	Episode: "Chapter One"
2009	Supernatural	Roger / War	Episode: "Good God, Y'All"
2009–2010	Lost	Man In Black	3 episodes
2010	The Closer	Gregory Drisken	Episode: "Help Wanted"
2009–2010	Sons of Anarchy	Jimmy O'Phelan	13 episodes
2010	True Blue	John Leeson	Television movie
2010	Lost: The Final Journey	Himself / narrator	Television documentary
2011	Law & Order: LA	Attorney Kennedy	Episode: "Angel's Knoll"
2011, 2015	Suits	Dominic Barone	3 episodes
2009–2011	The Good Wife	Glenn Childs	Recurring role; 16 episodes
2011–2012	CSI: Crime Scene Investigation	Mark Gabriel / Matt Gabriel	3 episodes
2011	Awakening	The Hunter	Television movie
2011	Good Morning, Killer	Mike Donato	Television movie
2012	Grimm	Farley Kolt	Episode: "Three Coins in a Fuchsbau"
2012	Touch	Randall Meade	3 episodes
2012	Powers	Triphammer	Television movie
2012	Midnight Sun	Bennett Maxwell	Television movie
2013	White Collar	Senator Terence Pratt	2 episodes
2013–2016	Agents of S.H.I.E.L.D.	Agent Felix Blake	3 episodes
2014	The Mentalist	Michael Ridley	3 episodes
2014–2015	The Last Ship	Thorwald	4 episodes
2014–2021	Bosch	Detective Hieronymus 'Harry' Bosch	Lead role; 68 episodes
2018	Chicago P.D.	Ronald Booth	Episode: "Ghosts"
2018	Hell's Kitchen	Himself	Red guest diner Episode: "Hot Potato"
2019	Law & Order: Special Victims Unit	Attorney Rob Miller	3 episodes
2020	The Mandalorian	Imperial Captain	Episode: "Chapter 11: The Heiress"
2021	Castlevania	Ratko	Voice, 5 episodes
2021	Nova Vita	Dr. Dexter Luis	9 episodes
2022–2025	Bosch: Legacy	Harry Bosch	Lead role; 30 episodes
2022	Titans	Lex Luthor	Episode: "Lex Luthor"
2025	The Equalizer	Elijah Reed	Episode: "Sins of the Father"
2025	Ballard	Harry Bosch	3 episodes
2026	Dark Winds	Dominic McNair	Series 4
2026	The Westies	Glenn Keenan	Main cast
2026	Get Jiro	Bob	Voice
TBA	The Night Agent	Duval	Main role (season 4)
