= Neil Welliver =

American painter (1929 - 2005)

Neil Gavin Welliver (July 22, 1929 – April 5, 2005) was an American modern artist, best known for his large-scale landscape paintings inspired by the deep woods near his home in Maine. One of his sons, Titus Welliver became a successful actor as well as also being a painter.

== Life and career ==
Welliver was born in Millville, Pennsylvania. He graduated from the Philadelphia College of Art (now part of the University of the Arts) and then received an MFA from Yale University. At Yale, he studied with the abstract artists Burgoyne Diller and Josef Albers, whose theories on color were influential. Welliver taught at Cooper Union from 1953 to 1957 and at Yale from 1956 to 1966. In 1966, he began teaching at, and eventually became chairman of the University of Pennsylvania Graduate School of Fine Art, from which he retired in 1989.

While teaching at Yale, Welliver's style evolved from abstract color field painting to the realistic transcription of small-town scenes in watercolor. In the early 1960s he went to Maine, where he began painting figures outdoors, the large oil paintings often focusing on his sons canoeing or female nudes bathing. In 1970 he moved permanently to Lincolnville, and by the mid 1970s the figure as subject had given way to the exclusive study of landscape.

His mature works, often as large as 8 by 10 feet (2.4 by 3.0 m), are at once richly painted abstractions and clear representational images of intimate Maine landscapes, taking as their subjects rocky hills, beaver houses, tree stumps, and rushing water, occasionally opening out to blue cloud-laden skies. Carrying his equipment on his back, Welliver hiked into the woods to make plein-air sketches. His equipment-laden backpack weighed 70 pounds, and included eight colors of oil paint: white, ivory black, cadmium red scarlet, manganese blue, ultramarine blue, lemon yellow, cadmium yellow, and talens green light. These plein-air studies usually took about 9 hours, and were painted in 3 hour increments, after which time the light would change too much to continue. Welliver insisted that he was uninterested in trying to copy the exact colors of objects, desiring instead to find "a color that makes it look like it is, again, surrounded by air." He often painted outdoors in winter, and enjoyed the crystal quality of the air and luminosity created by light reflecting off snow, but acknowledged that the process was not easy:

Painting outside in winter is not a macho thing to do. It's more difficult than that. To paint outside in the winter is painful. It hurts your hands, it hurts your feet, it hurts your ears. Painting is difficult. The paint is rigid, it's stiff, it doesn't move easily. But sometimes there are things you want and that's the only way you get them.

Welliver later expanded some of the outdoor studies into large paintings in the studio, painting 4 to 7 hours a day, meticulously starting the canvases in the upper left-hand corner and finishing in the lower right. If the finished paintings were vibrantly painted, containing "an emotional intensity that goes beyond the ordinary limits of realism", they also tended to be emotionally somber.

Welliver died of pneumonia in Belfast, Maine on April 5, 2005 near his home in Lincolnville. He was survived by his wife, Mimi Welliver.

Welliver's works are represented in many museums, among them the Metropolitan Museum of Art, Museum of Modern Art, Museum of Fine Arts, Boston, Crystal Bridges Museum of American Art and the Hirshhorn Museum and Sculpture Garden.

== Personal life ==
Welliver's personal life was marked by tragedy. In 1975, he lost his home, studio, and all the art therein to a fire. In 1976, a daughter died, followed soon thereafter by the death of his second wife. In 1991, his son Eli was killed, and a second son, Silas, died. Of his surviving children, one is the actor Titus Welliver, and another is Ethan Welliver.

== Controversy ==
In January 2018, The Pennsylvania Gazette, the University of Pennsylvania's alumni magazine, published an op-ed from a Penn graduate that described several encounters with Neil Welliver, accusing him of leveraging his position as chair of the university's Department of Fine Arts to sexually harass students.

The letter detailed a period of sexual harassment and unwanted sexual advances during the student's matriculation at Penn, and noted that Welliver was known on campus as the "Silver Fox". The Dean of the University of Pennsylvania School of Design, Frederick Steiner, responded in the same paper with a letter offering support to the op-ed and asking other readers to come forward with similar stories.

== Bibliography ==
- Welliver, Neil; Doty, Robert M.; Myers, John Bernard & Denby, Edwin (1981). Neil Welliver: Paintings, 1966–1980: [exhibition]. Manchester, N.H.: Currier Gallery of Art. ISBN 0-87451-207-7.
- Schudel, Matt (April 8, 2005). "Neil Welliver, 75, Dies; Maine Landscape Painter". The Washington Post. p. B07.
