= Courtney Taylor (actress) =

American actress

- Occupation: Actress
- Years active: 2017–present

Courtney Taylor is an American actress and comedian. She acted in Insecure, The Company You Keep, Abbott Elementary, Ballard, The Invitation, Out of My Mind, and others.

== Career ==
Taylor began her career starring in the web-series Single & Anxious from 2017 to 2019, before recurring role in the HBO comedy series, Insecure. In 2022, she made her big screen debut appearing in the horror-thriller film, The Invitation. Later that year, Taylor was cast in a series regular role in the Allblk comedy series, Send Help.

She was cast in her first major television role in season three of Insecure as Quoia, Issa's assistant. From 2022 to 2023 she had a recurring role in the ABC comedy series, Abbott Elementary and in 2023 also had a recurring role in the ABC drama The Company You Keep playing the assistant of series' lead. Later in 2023, Taylor starred in the Netflix comedy series, Neon. In 2024, Taylor starred alongside Phoebe-Rae Taylor, Rosemarie DeWitt, Luke Kirby and Judith Light in the drama film, Out of My Mind. The film premiered at the Sundance Film Festival.

== Filmography ==
Year	Title	Role	Notes
2017–2019	Single & Anxious	Jasmine	12 episodes
2020–2021	Insecure	Sequoia	8 episodes
2022	Hysterical	Jaylin	Short film
2022	The Invitation	Grace	
2022	Send Help	Nicole Cooper	Series regular, 7 episodes
2022–present	Abbott Elementary	Erika	12 episodes
2023	The Company You Keep	Mason	8 episodes
2023	Killing It	Monica	Episode: "Mallory"
2023	Neon	Mia	Series regular, 8 episodes
2024	Out of My Mind	Dr. Katherine Post	
2024–present	Shrinking	Courtney	7 episodes
2025	Ballard	Samira Parker	Series regular, 10 episodes
2026	Get Jiro	Cynda Lynn, Waiter (voices)	Series regular
