= Jesus Is the One (I Got Depression) =

2019 song by Zack Fox and Kenny Beats

Single by Zack Fox and Kenny Beats
- Released: June 2019
- Genre: Comedy hip hop
- Length: 1:52
- Label: Zack Fox; D.O.T.S.; Empire
- Songwriters: Zack Fox; Kenneth Blume III; John "Johnny Boy" Civello
- Producer: Kenny Beats

Zack Fox singles chronology
"Square Up" (2018)	"Jesus Is the One (I Got Depression)" (2019)	"The Bean Kicked in" (2019)

Kenny Beats singles chronology
"Puff Daddy" (2018)	"Jesus Is the One (I Got Depression)" (2019)	"Phone Numbers" (2019)

"Jesus Is the One (I Got Depression)" is a 2019 comedy hip-hop song by Zack Fox and produced by Kenny Beats. Created in a freestyle rap session, the song went viral and has amassed 51.3 million streams in the United States on Spotify, topping the platform's US Viral Chart.

== Composition ==
"Jesus Is the One (I Got Depression)" is the second collaboration between Fox and Kenny Beats after their 2018 song "Square Up". The song was produced on the fifth episode of Kenny Beats' YouTube series The Cave, where he invites rappers into the studio to record a freestyle rap and creates an instrumental to go with it. On this episode, Fox requested "a beat that sound[s] like Runescape mixed with Jodeci mixed with almond milk mixed with domestic violence... Make me a pro-lifer beat. Make me a Bernie bro beat. Make me a post-9/11, pre-death of Whitney Houston-style beat." While rapping, Fox pulls down his pants and wears a top hat and wrap-around sunglasses. His lyrics are equally as bizarre and nonsensical: Fox says people with mental illnesses should "turn up", preemptively mourns the death of Betty White (as he knows "it's coming up" – she would pass away about two and a half years later), calls to free Palestine and Tay-K, and more.

== Reception ==
The song was not intended for commercial release, but after it went viral, the duo released an official version in June 2019. As of June 2025, the original The Cave episode has 9.8 million views, the official release's YouTube video has surpassed 19 million views, and the song also has more than 51.3 million streams on Spotify. TikTok also contributed to the song's fame.

Despite its popularity, both artists were bemused with the song's fame. In an interview with Rolling Stone, Fox said: "Is it that people want something this meaningless, or is it that everything is already so meaningless that this fits right in? [Hip hop] is so broken right now I bet someone could literally troll their way to the top." In an interview with Genius, Kenny Beats said that "this song is bigger than all the serious shit I'm working on. It's TikTok's fault. It's Zack's fault."

== Certifications ==
Certifications for "Jesus Is the One (I Got Depression)"
Region	Certification	Certified units/sales
United States (RIAA)	Gold	500,000^{‡}
^{‡} Sales+streaming figures based on certification alone.
