= Desert Star (novel) =

2022 novel by Michael Connelly

- Hardcover edition
- Author: Michael Connelly
- Language: English
- Series: Harry Bosch
- Release number: 24
- Genre: Crime, mystery, thriller
- Publisher: Little, Brown and Company
- Publication date: November 8, 2022
- Publication place: United States
- Media type: Print (hardback & paperback)
- Pages: 391
- ISBN: 978-0-316-48565-4
- OCLC: 1322237505
- Dewey Decimal: 813/.54
- LC Class: PS3553.O51165 D47 2022
- Preceded by: The Dark Hours
- Followed by: The Waiting

Desert Star is a crime thriller novel, and the thirty-seventh novel by American author Michael Connelly, and the twenty-fourth novel featuring Los Angeles Police Department detective Harry Bosch, and also the fifth novel featuring Renee Ballard.

The book was published on November 8, 2022 by Little, Brown and Company.

== Plot ==
Harry Bosch, a retired LAPD homicide detective, lines up pills on his kitchen table when Renée Ballard arrives. She asks him to join a newly formed Open-Unsolved Unit handling cold homicide cases. City Councilman Jake Pearlman had pushed for its creation after his sister Sarah was raped and murdered in 1994. Bosch agrees, hoping to solve the Gallagher family murders, which have haunted him for years.

Ballard's team includes Paul Masser, a retired deputy district attorney, and Colleen Hatteras, a civilian genealogist. Ted Rawls, a retired Santa Monica police officer, has joined at the request of Nelson Hastings, Pearlman's chief of staff.

Bosch examines Sarah Pearlman's case. DNA recovered from tape used to lift a palm print matches evidence from the 2005 murder of Laura Wilson, an aspiring actress found strangled in her Hollywood apartment. The blood in Wilson's urine indicated that her killer may have suffered from kidney or bladder disease.

Bosch also revisits the Gallagher murders. Irish immigrant Stephen Gallagher ran an equipment rental business before he and his family disappeared in 2013. His associate Finbar McShane sold company assets worth more than $800,000 before vanishing. The family's remains were found a year later, with a nail gun from Gallagher's warehouse identified as the murder weapon. Bosch questions former office manager Sheila Walsh and learns that her son, rather than McShane, committed a burglary at her home.

Ballard finds a campaign button bearing Pearlman's name among Wilson's belongings, former campaign manager Sandy Kramer confirms that Hastings and Rawls participated in Pearlman's 2005 campaign. Bosch obtains medical records indicating Hastings had undergone kidney removal, making him a suspect. However, DNA collected from Hastings at a coffee shop does not match the evidence. Hastings admits he donated his kidney to Rawls, whose cancer had destroyed both kidneys.

Bosch tracks Rawls to Santa Monica. Rawls flees by car, forcing Bosch into a pursuit. After Rawls spins Bosch's vehicle off course, he shoots Bosch in the ear. Bosch fires back, wounding Rawls, who then kills himself. A box in Rawls's trunk contains souvenirs taken from victims. DNA and palm prints confirm his guilt in both murders.

Ballard finds another box in an alley dumpster containing a bracelet belonging to Olga Reyes, whose boyfriend Jorge Ochoa was convicted of her murder in 2009. The evidence points to Rawls as the killer, but prosecutors decline to act because the chain of custody is inadequate. Ballard asks Bosch's half-brother, defense attorney Mickey Haller, to seek Ochoa's release through a habeas corpus petition.

Bosch learns McShane is living in Key West under the name Davy Byrne. He travels there alone and kills McShane during a confrontation, closing the Gallagher case. Ballard later finds Bosch in a hotel room. He admits that radioactive caesium exposure has given him cancer affecting his bone marrow. He has kept counterfeit fentanyl pills to end his life if his illness becomes unbearable. Ballard urges him to tell his daughter Maddie, and he agrees.

At the Mojave gravesite, Bosch scatters the Gallagher family's ashes beside four rebuilt rock columns. He declines to return to Ballard's unit. As they leave, he compares Ballard to the desert star flowers growing near the graves, recalling a friend's description of their resilience. They drive back toward the city.

== Reception ==
Oline H. Cogdill of the Sun Sentinel called the novel "superb" and praised its "heart-wrenching" ending. Chris Hewitt of the Minnesota Star Tribune wrote: "Both cases are absorbing and Ballard's outings with Bosch have made her a sharper (and crankier) character." A review in Kirkus Reviews opined that of the two murder cases featured in the novel, the Pearlman cases is "considerably more interesting—partly because the break that leads the unit to a surprising new suspect turns out to be both fraught and misleading, partly because identifying the killer is only the beginning of Bosch's problems", while the Gallagher case is "more heartfelt but less wily and dramatic." The review concluded that the novel is "Not the best of Connelly's procedurals, but nobody else does them better than his second-best."
