= The Dark Hours (novel) =

2021 novel by Michael Connelly

- Hardcover edition
- Author: Michael Connelly
- Language: English
- Series: Harry Bosch
- Release number: 23
- Genre: Crime, mystery, thriller
- Publisher: Little, Brown and Company
- Publication date: November 9, 2021
- Publication place: United States
- Media type: Print (hardback & paperback)
- Pages: 391
- ISBN: 978-0-316-48564-7
- OCLC: 1280134182
- Dewey Decimal: 813/.6
- LC Class: PS3553.O51165 D35
- Preceded by: The Night Fire
- Followed by: Desert Star

The Dark Hours is a crime thriller novel, and the thirty-sixth novel by American author Michael Connelly, and the twenty-third novel featuring Los Angeles Police Department detective Harry Bosch, and also the fourth novel featuring Renee Ballard.

The book was published on November 9, 2021 by Little, Brown and Company.

== Plot ==
On New Year's Eve in Los Angeles, LAPD Detective Renée Ballard patrols Hollywood Division's midnight shift with Detective Lisa Moore of the Sexual Assault Unit. They watch for the Midnight Men, two serial rapists who attack women on holiday nights, cover their eyes with tape masks, and cut off a lock of each victim's hair. The two assaults occurred on Thanksgiving and Christmas Eve, and Ballard expects another.

At midnight, celebratory gunfire sends Ballard and Moore to a street party, where body-shop owner Javier Raffa has been shot. Raffa, formerly associated with Las Palmas 13, dies at hospital. The gunpowder marks around his wound show that someone fired at close range. Ballard withholds this finding to retain the inquiry, Raffa's teenage son, Gabriel, recalls a shaved-headed white man at the party and mentions his father's doctor business partner.

A .22 casing matches evidence from a 2011 unsolved killing once handled by retired detective Harry Bosch. The victim, Albert Lee, borrowed money at high interest from dentist John William James, who took over Lee's business and insured him for a million dollars. Lee was murdered, and James died two years afterward. Bosch agrees to assist Ballard unofficially.

Cindy Carpenter, a Los Feliz coffee-shop manager, reports a New Year's Eve rape hours after it occurred. With Moore away, Ballard interviews Carpenter, who recalls two attackers wearing black latex gloves. One had red pubic hair. They vacuumed her home and may have photographed or filmed her. Ballard finds signs that one man hid inside a closet before Carpenter arrived. A neighbor saw the garage door open while Carpenter remained at work. The attackers appear to have selected women beforehand and followed them home.

Bosch examines corporate records tying James to Dr. Dennis Hoyle, Raffa's undisclosed business partner. The both owned Crown Labs, a Burbank dental laboratory, with dentists Jason Abbott and Carlos Esquivel. The murder file for James has vanished from police storage under a false name.

Ballard learns that two men posing as Bureau of Street Lighting employees visited Carpenter's street before her assault. The one had red hair, a cut wire inside a streetlight confirms deliberate interference near all three victims' homes. The real bureau uses flatbed trucks, not vans.

Ballard and Bosch identify Christopher Bonner, a former LAPD detective and hired killer linked to gang leader Humberto Viera. Viera's former girlfriend confirms Bonner matches Gabriel's description. At Raffa's memorial, Hoyle flees when questioned. A lawyer says Raffa had sought to end a partnership without a termination clause. Lieutenant Robinson-Reynolds removes Ballard from the inquiry.

Bonner later breaks into Ballard's apartment and tries to force her own gun into her mouth. Ballard crushes his windpipe and performs an emergency tracheotomy with telephone guidance from EMT Garrett Single. Bonner pulls out the breathing tube and dies. Ballard conceals a burner phone found on him.

The under desk-duty restrictions, Ballard records Hoyle admitting that Abbott planned seven killings, she arrests Abbott at Crown Labs. Robinson-Reynolds suspends her, but a temporary reinstatement lets her obtain Hoyle's agreement to surrender his company share to Raffa's family.

A newspaper report exposes the concealed rapes. Ballard suspects Moore leaked it. After a new streetlight outage near engineer Hannah Stovall's home, Ballard swaps places with her and waits inside. Two intruders arrive; Ballard kills both during the confrontation. Airport questioning later brings Stovall's former boyfriend, Gilbert Denning, to admit he found the attackers through anonymous online forums. Ballard records his confession and plans to contact the FBI. The police chief visits Ballard with her old badge and asks her to return. Ballard takes her adopted dog, Pinto, and goes surfing while considering the offer.

== Reception ==
Publishers Weekly called it a "masterpiece", writing that Connelly "avoids polemics while exploring such issues as internal disaffection among the police (including Ballard's ambivalence about her career), misogyny and domestic violence, and the political divide that resulted in the January 6 insurrection at the Capitol." Richard Klinzman of The Florida Times-Union wrote that it "must be tough to continue a long-running career of crime novels the way Connelly does and to never allow the bar to be lowered but he continues to do a masterful job." Kirkus Reviews wrote that "no one who follows Ballard and Bosch to the end will be disappointed."
