= Marc LeBlanc =

Video game designer

Marc "Mahk" LeBlanc is an educator and designer of video games.

LeBlanc attended MIT where he received a B.S. and M.S. in Computer Science.

Through his work with Looking Glass Studios, LeBlanc contributed to a number of important video game titles including Ultima Underworld II, System Shock, Flight Unlimited, Terra Nova, and Thief.

After Looking Glass, LeBlanc went to work for Sega, developing artificial intelligence for the Visual Concepts line of sports games. In 2003, LeBlanc went to work for Mind Control Software, where, with Andrew Leker, he co-developed Oasis, which won an Independent Games Festival award. In addition, LeBlanc has participated in a number of Indie Game Jams.

LeBlanc has led a number of Game Design Tuning Workshops at the Game Developers Conference, where he explores his theories on game design, specifically the Mechanics/Dynamics/Aesthetics (MDA) framework. MDA is based in part on the Formal Abstract Design Tools for games discussion initiated by Doug Church. LeBlanc runs a site, 8kindsoffun.com, including the MDA work and his breakdown of "fun" for game design.

== 8 Kinds of Fun ==
In his work on 8 kinds of fun, LeBlanc explains that when describing fun people should steer away from vague words such as "gameplay" and "fun". Instead he suggests that a more direct vocabulary should be used. This includes but is not limited to the taxonomy listed below:

1. Sensation: Game as sense-pleasure. Games that evoke emotion in the player, be it through sound, visuals, controller rumble or physical effort. Examples: Dead Space, Dance Dance Revolution, Candy Crush Saga
2. Fantasy: Game as make-believe. Game as a means to take the player to another world. Some call it escapism. Examples: Final Fantasy, Nier: Automata, The Legend of Zelda
3. Narrative: Game as drama. Game as a means to tell a story or narrative to the player. Examples: The Walking Dead, Persona 3, Dear Esther
4. Challenge: Game as obstacle course. Games that provide the player(s) with highly competitive value or with increasingly difficult challenges. Examples: Dark Souls, Tetris, X-COM
5. Fellowship: Game as social framework. Games that have social interactions as its core or as a big feature. Examples: Mario Kart, Destiny, World of Warcraft
6. Discovery: Game as uncharted territory. Games in which the player explores a world. Examples: Uncharted, Tomb Raider, Assassin's Creed
7. Expression: Game as self-discovery. Games that allow for self-expression from the player through gameplay. Examples: Minecraft, Garry's Mod, Roblox
8. Submission: Game as pastime. Games that have "farming" or "grinding" as a core element. Examples: FarmVille, Hyperdimension Neptunia, Disgaea

A game does not need to have only one of the above, nor all of them. Just because these are different kinds of fun does not mean that everyone finds all eight of these things fun at all. Not only do different games provide different combinations and relative quantities of the various kinds of fun, but different players find different combinations more or less fun than others.

== See also ==
- Bartle taxonomy of player types
