= Companion Jorune: Burdoth =

Companion Jorune: Burdoth is a 1986 role-playing game supplement published by SkyRealms Publishing for Skyrealms of Jorune.

== Contents ==
Companion Jorune: Burdoth is a supplement in which a campaign setting covers Burdoth (human realm), Heridoth (chaotic, war-torn land), nearby islands, and Khodre (oversea territory), with details on Burdoth's history, timeline, and military organization.

== Publication history ==
Companion Jorune: Burdoth was written by Andrew Leker with art by Miles Teves and published by SkyRealms Publishing in 1986 as a 64-page book.

== Reviews ==
- White Dwarf (Issue 82 - Oct 1986)
- Casus Belli (Issue 43 - Feb 1988)
- Games Review (Volume 1, Issue 1 - Oct 1988)
