= Earth-Tec Jorune =

Earth-Tec Jorune is a 1988 role-playing game supplement published by SkyRealms Publishing for Skyrealms of Jorune.

== Contents ==
Earth-Tec Jorune is a supplement in which forgotten Earth technology is detailed, with rules for cryogenics, power systems, robots, weapons, and genetic engineering with engineered creatures.

== Publication history ==
Earth-Tec Jorune was written by Andrew Leker with art by Miles Teves and published by SkyRealms Publishing in 1988 as a 32-page book.

== Reviews ==
- Casus Belli #48
