= Maustin Caji =

Maustin Caji is a 1984 role-playing game adventure published by SkyRealms Publishing for Skyrealms of Jorune.

== Plot summary ==
Maustin Caji is an adventure in which the player characters journey to confront a gang of villains who invaded Burdoth three decades earlier, with the lair serving as the central destination.

== Publication history ==
Maustin Caji was written by Andrew Leker with art by Miles Teves and published by SkyRealms Publishing in 1984 as a digest-sized 32-page book.
