= Companion Jorune: Ardoth =

Companion Jorune: Ardoth is a 1987 role-playing game supplement published by SkyRealms Publishing for Skyrealms of Jorune.

== Contents ==
Companion Jorune: Ardoth is a supplement in which a campaign setting details Ardoth, the human capital city, including the Cryshell Citadel, the Ardoth Guard, its neighborhoods, the under-city, and surrounding lands.

== Publication history ==
Companion Jorune: Ardoth was written by Andrew Leker, Mark Wallace, and David Ackerman, with art by Miles Teves and published by SkyRealms Publishing in 1987 as a 48-page book.

== Reviews ==
- Papyrus (Issue 9 - 1993)
- Casus Belli (Issue 43 - Feb 1988)
- Games Review (Volume 1, Issue 1 - Oct 1988)
