= Ben (The Walking Dead) =

Ben from The Walking Dead refers to multiple characters:

- Ben, a character in the video game The Walking Dead
- Ben, a character in the television show The Walking Dead
