= Lee Everett =

Fictional character in The Walking Dead video game series

- The Walking Dead character
- Lee Everett, as he appears in The Walking Dead.
- First appearance: "A New Day" (2012)
- Created by: Telltale Games
- Voiced by: Dave Fennoy

Lee Everett is one of the protagonists of Telltale's The Walking Dead video game series, debuting as the playable main protagonist of the first season. He is 37 years old when he debuts. Tasked with protecting a girl named Clementine in the midst of a zombie apocalypse, Lee allies with several other characters and groups. When creating the character, Telltale worked with realism in mind, placing strong emphasis on him being a parental figure to Clementine.

Lee is voiced by Dave Fennoy, an American voice actor, who received positive accolades for his role in the game, specifically his voice work and writing. Fennoy was nominated for Best Performance by a Human Male at the Spike VGA.

== Appearances ==
Prior to the game's events, Lee, a native of Macon, was a history professor at the University of Georgia. One day, on his way to work, he fell ill and came home to find his wife sleeping with a state senator. In a fit of rage, Lee killed him, and was subsequently convicted of murder. The game opens with Lee being driven to prison by a police officer to begin serving his life sentence, only for the car to hit a walker and swerve off the highway, followed shortly by the officer turning into a walker. Lee takes shelter in a nearby suburban home, where he finds a young girl named Clementine, who has been hiding from the zombies as her parents had left for Savannah some time before the apocalypse. The two go together and find themselves at the farm of Hershel Greene, where they meet a man named Kenny with his wife and son, Katjaa and Duck. The group are thrown out after an accident kills Hershel's son, forming a small group with survivors, including a woman named Lilly and her father Larry, the latter of which knows the truth about Lee's past.

After being held up in a motel for months, the group meets the St. John family, who invite them to dinner at their family dairy, eventually discovering them to be cannibals who plan to kill and eat his group. After escaping the St. Johns, the group finds a station wagon parked in the woods with supplies, which they take whether Lee supports it or not. In the next episode, the group is forced to flee the motel from bandits and head to Savannah using a train, with Clementine seeking her parents and Kenny seeking a boat. As they approach the city, Clementine's walkie-talkie goes off, revealing the voice of a man who knows of Lee's actions and promises Clementine that she will be safe with him. In Savannah, they encounter multiple characters, including a doctor named Vernon. They secure a boat for their journey, and before Vernon departs, he remarks that he believes Lee to be an unfit guardian for Clementine. Lee later finds Clementine gone, and while searching for her, he is bitten. Lee and the other survivors agree to look for Clementine. He is later given the option to amputate his arm to slow the infection; after choosing to keep or amputate it, the group returns to find Vernon has stolen the boat. Kenny is lost as walkers surround him, and Lee eventually finds his way to the stranger, who explains that he was the owner of the station wagon and believes that Lee is too dangerous to leave Clementine with him. After the stranger is killed, they cover their scent with walker guts and walk through a horde of walkers, where they spot Clementine's zombified parents before Lee passes out.

When Lee awakens, he is out of strength and barely able to keep conscious, but finds Clementine has dragged him to safety. With his time short, Lee helps Clementine secure keys and a gun to escape the city. Depending on the player's choice, Lee either tells Clementine to shoot him and prevent his reanimation or leave him to become a walker. Throughout the five episodes, the player makes choices as Lee that affect his relationship with others and characters' survival; the first episode has him choose who to save between characters Doug and Carley, while the third episode has Lee deciding whether to keep Lilly in the group after she kills someone over her belief that they were helping the bandits steal from them.

Lee appears in the Clementine comic sequel.

== Concept and creation ==
Lee first appeared in the 2012 episodic video game The Walking Dead as the playable character. He is voiced by Dave Fennoy, and was written by multiple people, including Gary Whitta. Fennoy received an audition in an email, and after completing it, a call confirming that he got the role. The audition asked for actors to portray him in a "very real" fashion, which is a part of Lee's design that attracted Fennoy. He called Lee "complicated" due to his criminal history, his concern for keeping Clementine safe, and the fact that he associates with people that he may not have, had it not been for the zombie outbreak. He added that him having a child of his own helped him relate to Lee and Clementine's relationship. Whitta described their relationship as "emotionally authentic". Dan Connors, CEO of Telltale Games, compared Lee to Rick Grimes, the protagonist of The Walking Dead comics and TV series. He called him both tough and smart, while also caring. He also called him a "reflection of the player's choices". Telltale designer and writer Harrison G. Pink commented that it was important to make everything Lee would say believable, and that Lee is a "human being" with "real needs and real fears and real desires". While they wanted to allow players to choose what Lee says, all options are things that Lee would realistically say. Lead writer Sean Vanaman said that they also wanted to contextualize issues about race within the game; they spent time to write the backstory of events that Lee had faced from racism that led to the confrontation with his wife, and worked to make Lee and other characters' dialog reflect on Lee's experiences rather than including simply stereotypical representations of racial conflict.

== Reception ==
Lee was acclaimed by critics and fans. IGN's Colin Campbell wrote an article detailing why Lee "really matters". He explains that the reason why the game is so good is because Lee has a lot of great qualities, such as being nice and modest about his abilities. He goes on to describe him as an "everyman".

Fellow IGN writer Greg Miller also cited Lee for why he enjoys the game; he wrote that he felt he was actually involved in Lee's development.

Polygon included him and Clementine as one of the 70 best video game characters of the 2010s with the publication's Colin Campbell writing, "Lee is an escaped convict in the midst of a zombie outbreak who finds himself caring for a frightened, vulnerable girl called Clementine. Later seasons show Clementine’s debt to Lee, and the lessons she learned from her redoubtable mentor. These are characters who are genuinely loved by their many fans."

Kotaku's Kirk Hamilton writes that he is more interested in seeing Lee grow than Rick Grimes, the protagonist of The Walking Dead comics and TV series.

Rock Paper Shotgun's John Walker wrote that Lee was an everyman character in zombie fiction.

Samuel James Riley of GamesRadar listed Lee alongside Clementine as one of the best video game duos, and further stated that the characters' story is touching and ultimately one of the most tragic friendships in gaming history.

The Daily Telegraph's Emily Richardson felt that the characters drove the story, and cited Lee and his "mysterious and complex" character design as a notable example.

GamesRadar staff named Lee the 84th-best video game hero. They cited his bravery and devotion to Clementine for his inclusion. Dave Fennoy received praise for his portrayal of Lee, such as by Alan Danzis of the New York Post.

Fennoy was nominated for the "Best Performance by a Human Male" award at the 2012 Spike TV Video Game Awards, and for the "Performance" category at the 2013 British Academy Video Games Awards. Lee Everett's character, both in writing and voice acting, won the "Outstanding Character Performance" award at the 16th Annual D.I.C.E. Awards.
