= Silencer (video game) =

Multiplayer online shooter

- Title art used by publisher, WON.net, on their website
- Developer: Mind Control Software
- Publisher: WON.net
- Producer: Andrew Leker
- Programmer: Jonathan Stone
- Platform: Windows
- Genres: Shooter, capture the flag
- Mode: Multiplayer

Silencer is an online, multiplayer-only video game by Mind Control Software that was published by the World Opponent Network (WON.net) for free play on their website in January 2000. It features capture-the-flag-style gameplay—common in 3D first-person shooter arenas at the time—but presents it in a low-resource 2D package. The game was released by WON.net as an open beta. It saw a number of beta updates before it was removed, without explanation, from WON.net's website in September 2000 and the multiplayer servers shut down in October 2000. Silencer is a bit of an anomaly in that it managed to spawn a fan-made WONswap site, 7 known fansites, plus a legacy of independent multiplayer servers and game clones (see below), from its short run as an open beta on WON.net.

== Gameplay ==
Silencer combines the elements of a platform game with science fiction action games such as Crusader: No Remorse (an earlier game that also features characters called "Silencers"). The game involves five competing agencies that send agents, called "Silencers," into the field to hack public computer terminals with the goal of exposing the Martian government's secrets. The player controls a Silencer that carries an array of weapons and other items. Silencers in the same team work together to kill enemy Silencers while also collecting secrets. There can be more than one team from the same agency.

The five agencies each have specializations which give them various advantages over each other (including access to one agency-specific item):

- Noxis – good jumpers and high endurance (good for beginners)
- Static – skilled hackers and excellent radar technology
- Caliber – upper-class group with great pay and easy access to secret info
- Lazarus – high-tech cult that worships rebirth
- Black Rose – elite agency whose agents always work alone

At the start of each game, each team's leader creates a hidden door to a base at any location on the map they choose. This base has features for healing, purchasing a variety of items and weapons, and storing secrets. Silencers search the playfield for computer terminals to hack while evading assault from enemy Silencers. Silencers are paid for any hacked information they make it back to base with (for the purchase of more items). As the game progresses and intel is collected, teams will learn the location of a terminal with a top secret. A Silencer then has a limited amount of time to retrieve the top secret. The first team to successfully store three top secrets in their base wins the scenario.

Disguise is an important feature of the gameplay as it allows a Silencer to appear as an NPC to pass unnoticed by guards, robots and defense lasers. Firing a weapon or getting shot will instantly turn off a Silencer's disguise mode.

Each Silencer is also equipped with a jet pack that can be used for five seconds before needing to recharge (which happens automatically over time). The jet pack can be upgraded for increased air time.

Beta Bites said the game features up to 16 players while WON.net said it is for 8 players. Different maps have different limits on max players and max teams. Up to 3 players per team.

== Plot ==
At the Arsia Mons colony on Mars, in the near future, the government is tyrant number one. This has led to various factions working to overthrow the government. Agents in these competing agencies are known as "Silencers." Silencers are weapons-toting hackers who are out steal secrets and beat out the enemy Silencers at any cost. Steal three top secrets to get beamed out before the colony gets "cleansed."

== Development and release ==
Silencer was announced as early as April 1996 by SSI, the publisher of Mind Control's first title, Alien Logic: A Skyrealms of Jorune Adventure. Silencer was never published by SSI and, as of April 1999, it could be seen on Mind Control's website that Silencer was still looking for a publisher. In an interview with Mind Control founder, Andrew Leker, in June 1999, Leker revealed that the game had gone through "several" potential publishers and that WON.net had finally picked it up for launch in July 1999. It was not seen on WON.net until January 2000, still in beta. WON.net filed for the "SILENCER" trademark on January 4, 2000 (the last extension of it filed on November 21, 2001).

Silencer was released as on open beta on WON.net at version 0104:

- Version 0108 was released on February 8, 2000
- Version 0109 was released on March 1, 2000
- Version 0110 was released on May 23, 2000

Mind Control Software announced their closure on May 26, 2000. There is no citable source as to why Mind Control closed and/or why Silencer was removed from WON.net four months later. There are, however, unsourced claims on the www.Silencer.8k.com fansite as to how soon the full version was expected to be released, and why things fell apart. (Mind Control Software re-opened its doors years later in 2005, and closed again in 2013 as Electrified Games.)

== Reception ==
Because Silencer was removed from WON.net while it was still in open beta, it was not reviewed by magazines that only review video games after full release. It was, however, reviewed by Tass at Beta Bites (a publisher of news and reviews of games in beta release) who called Silencer "an addictive game. Just ask my wife, I was up until 0330 last night playing!" Tass gave the game a "Winner" rating, adding "This is one game I plan to follow and hope to see do well."

== Legacy ==
The level editor was released after the game's removal from WON.net on the www.Silencer.8k.com fansite.

In December 2000, a 3D adaption of Silencer was announced by a fan on www.Silencer.8k.com as a Half-Life mod.

In February 2007, Mind Control admitted publicly that they were discussing making Silencer open source. The end of that discussion was never revealed (or is lost). In September 2007, however, Mind Control released working server executables.

On September 16, 2007, a member of the Steamless CS Project Team released a binary-modified Silencer v0110 executable along with a proxy WON library file, both meant to bypass a WON authentication server. Members of Arsia Mons (arsia-mons.com, 2004–2011) then started hosting an independent lobby server for Silencer and distributed the patched game as Silencer version 0110.1. (This was later repackaged for easier install on November 27, 2007, as Silencer Beta 110 RevB.) On October 1, 2007, Arsia Mons announced a solution for running Silencer on a LAN instead of only over the internet.

In May 2009, the O2 Project was started in an effort to write a clone of Silencer, dubbed O2, using art and audio assets from the original but with completely original code. The project also included a map editor called Ozone (O3). One of the stated goals of the project is to support modern systems (the original Silencer is a Windows-98-era game). The first technical preview and code for O2 was released on July 20, 2010. The alpha release followed on December 5, 2010. The beta was released on August 24, 2011. In May 2012 the project was renamed to Cypher... and has not been heard from since.

There was also a clone project by "Pol" at s-i-l.tk around 2010, but little is known about it.

Another clone of Silencer, dubbed zSILENCER, was released in 2013, along with an online multiplayer server, plus website. Like O2, zSILENCER uses art and audio assets from the original with all new code. After version 00019, the source code was released as open-source (without a specified license) on GitHub on September 13, 2013. zSILENCER has been released on Windows, OS X and Linux, and ported to Open Pandora and Ouya. zSILENCER expands the multiplayer count to 24 players with no limit on team size. While the main website is still online, the wiki is gone, account creation and the forum are dead, and the multiplayer server was last seen in October 2020 (as of April 2023). zSILENCER managed to spawn one fansite, Arsia Mons (arsiamons.io, 2014–2016).
