= Joe Coleman =

Joe Coleman may refer to:

- Bongo Joe Coleman (1923–1999), American musician
- Joe Coleman (baseball, born 1922) (1922–1997), American Major League Baseball pitcher
- Joe Coleman (baseball, born 1947) (1947–2025), American Major League Baseball pitcher
- Joe Coleman (basketball) (born 1993), American basketball player
- Joe Coleman (game designer) (died 2021), American game designer, also known as Joseph K. Adams
- Joe Coleman (painter) (born 1955), American painter and illustrator
- Joseph E. Coleman (1922–2000), American politician

== See also ==
- Joseph Coleman (disambiguation)
