= Mind Control Software =

American video game developer

- Formerly: Electrified Software, Inc. (2011‍–‍2013); Mind Control Software, Inc. (2005‍–‍2011); Mind Control Software, LLC (2004‍–‍2005); Mind Control, Inc. (1998‍–‍2000); Mind Control Software (1994‍–‍2011)
- Company type: Private
- Industry: Video games
- Founded: 1994; 32 years ago in Berkeley, CA
- Founder: Andrew Leker
- Defunct: April 30, 2013
- Headquarters: San Rafael, California, US
- Key people: Eduardo Baraf; Marc LeBlanc; Jonathan Stone
- Products: Alien Logic (1994); Silencer (beta); Resurrection (1999); Oasis (2005); Field Commander (2006); Orbital Engine
- Website: mind-control.com

Mind Control Software was an American video game developer based in California. It was founded in 1994 by Andrew Leker while he was working with Ceridus Software on the video-game adaptation of his tabletop role-playing game Skyrealms of Jorune, titled Alien Logic. The company was active from 1994–2000 and 2004–2013.

== History ==
Andrew Leker generally states 1994 as the year he founded Mind Control Software—the same year Alien Logic was released by developer Ceridus Software (incorporated in 1989 by Michael J. Dalton; David Kalish and Amy Leker, directors). Mind Control's website states "Mind Control Software was founded in 1994 by Andrew Leker as a vehicle for realizing the interactive version of Skyrealms of Jorune," and generally lists Alien Logic as their first game. Yet, Leker stated in an interview in 1999 that "for several years I led the design and technical execution of the SkyRealms of Jorune computer RPG, Alien Logic. ... After Alien Logic, my company, Mind Control Software wrote a game called Silencer...." Thus, it appears that exactly when and how Mind Control was established, and why, is complicated. Regardless, the first appearance of Mind Control in state records is in 1998 as Mind Control, Inc. (just over a year before Ceridus "wound up" operations in 1999).

Strategic Simulations (SSI), the publisher of Alien Logic, announced Mind Control's next game, Silencer, in April 1996. There was a delay, and SSI never published it, however. Silencer was published in 2000 by WON.net only as an open beta, and it disappeared from the WON.net site before full release.

Meanwhile, Mind Control started work on Resurrection in August 1998 and released a development version of it in 1999 for GDC 1999. There, it participated in the first Independent Games Festival (IGF) and won "Best Game Design." Resurrection was later sold to Sega and became Ooga Booga (2001).

Mind Control Software announced their closure on May 26, 2000, just three days after the latest Silencer beta update was released. Their website shut down somewhere around 2002.

Mind Control Software re-emerged in late 2004 with the signing of LLC Articles of Organization on November 30, 2004 (filed on January 6, 2005). This was followed by Articles of Incorporation (creating Mind Control Software, Inc.) in December 2005. Mind Control's website reappeared in early 2005—which also announced that Marc LeBlanc had joined Leker as a chief designer. Apparently, previous to all this, Leker and LeBlanc had been working a game called Oasis since at least 2003 (when LeBlanc joined to help bring Oasis to market) which also won awards at the IGF.

Oasis was published by PlayFirst in April 2005. In August 2010, Mind Control announced that they had reacquired the rights to Oasis from PlayFirst and had already published an iPad version of it as Defense of the Oasis.

On July 21, 2009, Mind Control announced a collaboration with Richard Garfield and Skaff Elias to develop an online strategy game, code-named Mind Twist. It was never released and little is known about it.

In 2010, Mind Control announced the launch of a new brand, SpineCone Games, targeted at a younger audience.

In 2011, Mind Control Software changed their name to Electrified Software. In 2013, Electrified Software closed.

== Games ==
- Alien Logic: A Skyrealms of Jorune Adventure (1994) (developed by Ceridus Software, but with similar staff to the initial Mind Control employees)
- Resurrection (prototype 1999, IGF 1999 submission, became Ooga Booga)
- Silencer (beta released in 2000)
- Oasis (2005, IGF 2004 submission)*
- Spellagories (2005)*
- Timmy's Magic Word Garden (2006, IGF 2006 submission)*
- Bubble Symphony (2006, IGF 2006 submission)*
- Gem River (2006, IGF 2006 submission)*
- Field Commander (2006, for the PSP)
- Thwart Poker (2006)*
- Stomping Grounds (2006)*
- Arrrrrr! (2007)*
- DimensionM: Evolver (2007)
- Vector City Racers (2009)
- Mind Twist (announced 2009, presumably canceled)*

Games contributed to:

- The Unholy War (1998)
- Babel (1998)
- Ooga Booga (2001)
- Tino's Fruit Stand (2006)*

* Uses Mind Control's Orbital Engine (a.k.a. Orbital Game Platform)
