= Gary Whitta =

English writer and video game journalist

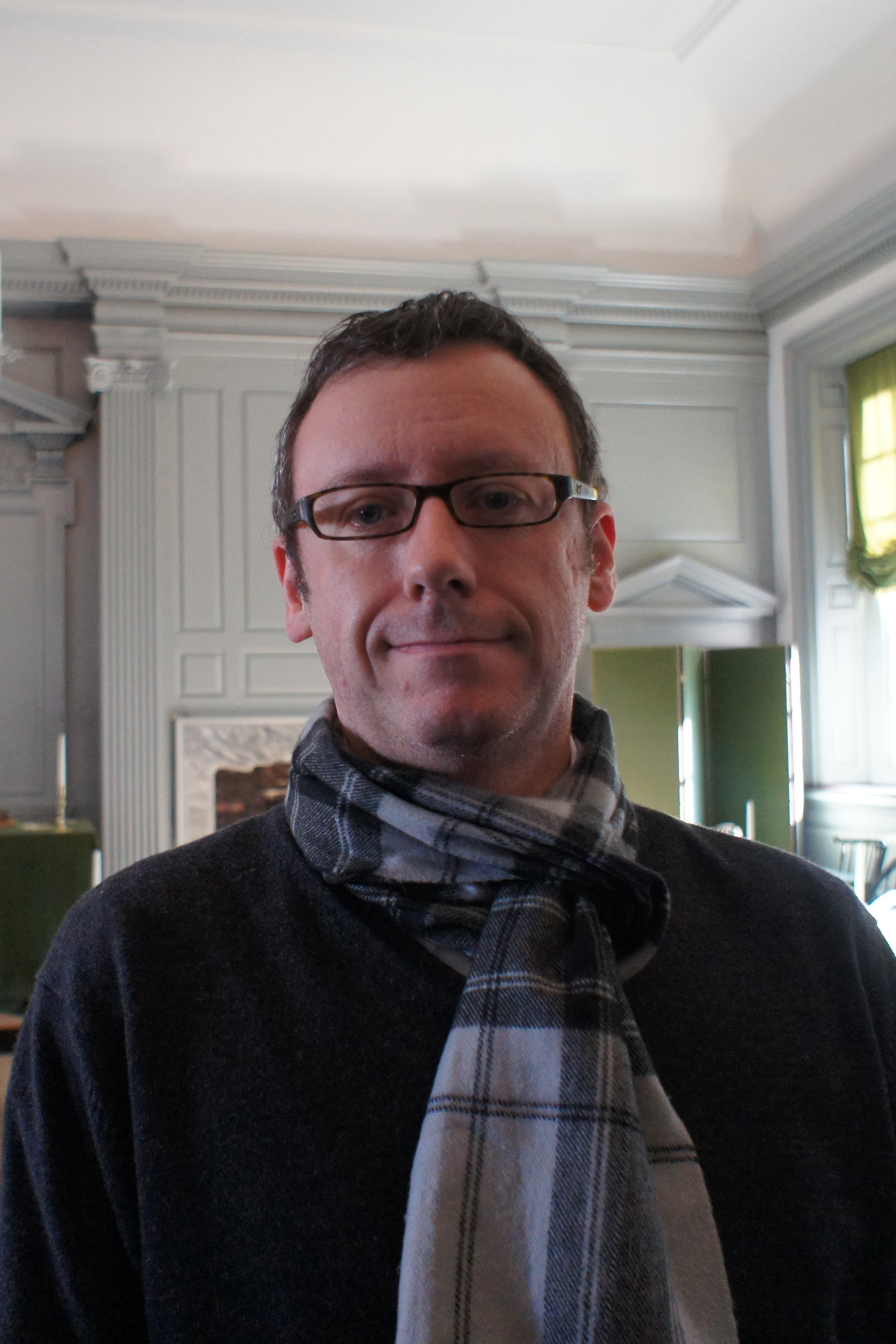
- Whitta in 2012
- Born: Gary Leslie Whitta; 21 July 1972 (age 54); Poplar, London, England
- Occupations: Author; screenwriter; video game designer
- Years active: 1990–present
- Spouse: Leah Whitta
- Children: 2

Gary Leslie Whitta (born 21 July 1972) is a British screenwriter, author, game designer, and video game journalist. Whitta was the screenwriter of the film The Book of Eli (2010), co-wrote the film After Earth (2013) with M. Night Shyamalan, and also co-developed the story for Rogue One (2016). He was the editor-in-chief of both the UK and US editions of PC Gamer magazine and was a contributor to the gaming magazine ACE.

== Career ==
Whitta began his career as a writer and games journalist for ACE magazine. When ACE closed down in 1992, he became deputy editor of The One for Amiga Games and was involved with founding the original PC Gamer magazine in the UK. He subsequently served as the editor of Total Football and also worked for C&VG. A few years later, he moved to the United States to become editor-in-chief of the newer, US version, of PC Gamer.

=== Magazine publishing ===
Whitta has a lengthy history of working with print and online journals of many types, in addition to his role in founding PC Gamer. ACE magazine was owned by UK publisher Future Publishing, and in early 2000 Whitta worked with Future to establish a film magazine, Total Movie magazine. Due to financial difficulties at the publisher, Total Movie was canceled after only four issues in early 2001.

While no longer managing or editing, Whitta still contributes game reviews and opinion pieces for a number of gaming publications. His articles can be found in various places, including PC Gamer and 1Up.com. He also shows up in industry podcasts, for example with Tested.com, PC Gamer and Next Generation.

=== Screenwriting ===
In addition to contributing to periodicals, Whitta has written a number of screenplays and TV episodes. A partial list, including the text of those which were not picked up, could at one time be found on his homepage.

Whitta has found Hollywood success as the screenwriter of the film The Book of Eli. He was also working on a script known as the "Monkey Project" with Chris Weston, which would have reimagined the classic Buddhist novel Journey to the West (and the related classic television series Monkey) as an animated series. However, Weston pulled out of the project.

He wrote the script for the action thriller film Undying. His latest screenwriting work was the sci-fi film After Earth. He was hired to script the first Star Wars stand-alone film, Rogue One, directed by Gareth Edwards. On 9 January 2015, he was announced to have amicably parted ways with the film.

On 27 October 2016, Variety reported that Warner Bros., Village Roadshow and Team Downey had put together a writers' room for the third of the Guy Ritchie Sherlock Holmes movies, with several top names, including Whitta, Nicole Perlman, Justin Malen, Geneve Dworet-Robertson and Kieran Fitzgerald.

=== Game development ===
Whitta has written for Duke Nukem Forever, Prey, and Gears of War. He has also consulted on general game design for Microsoft, Electronic Arts, Activision, Midway Games, and others. More recently, Whitta was tapped to oversee the narrative development of Telltale Games' episodic video game adaptation of The Walking Dead, while writing its fourth episode. Though he left Telltale after completing the first season, he returned to help complete The Walking Dead: The Final Season. He serves as a story consultant on Halo 5: Guardians.

He also developed Lewdle, a variant of the Wordle game.

=== Comic books ===
Whitta is also the writer behind a popular short series of comic books based on the Death, Jr. character, together with cover artist Mike Mignola and illustrator Ted Naifeh. Having been extended to a second three-part series, the writing has received praise as "charming and cleverly subversive" and for its "quirky characters and slick humor". Whitta spoke about his experience writing this comic with Silver Bullet Comics in May 2005.

Whitta is currently co-creating the comic OLIVER with Transmetropolitan/The Boys co-creator and illustrator Darick Robertson for a 2015 release from Image Comics.

=== Podcasts ===
Whitta was a frequent commentator on the PC Gamer podcast, and he co-hosted the Game Theory podcast with Colin Campbell, which has since stopped being produced. In September 2011, Whitta and Campbell, then News and Features Editor at IGN, started a new podcast in the same vein as Game Theory, called IGN's Game Business Show. He also commentated on the Next Gen podcast until the podcast was canceled.

He was a weekly co-host of This is Only a Test (Tested) and an occasional guest on Behind the Screened Door (Screened), the Giant Bombcast (Giant Bomb) the Comic Vine Podcast, before Whiskey Media was sold in two deals to CBS Interactive and BermanBraun. In October 2011, Whitta helped raise over $50,000 for Child's Play when he co-hosted a 24-hour-long, live-streamed edition of This is Only a Test with Tested creators Will Smith and Norman Chan. Whitta continues to chair the Octoberkast charity event every year, creating the "Space Rocks" game in 2013. Whitta has returned as a guest on Giant Bomb's Giant Bombcast in recent years.

In November 2017, Whitta became an official co-host for the video game podcast, Kinda Funny Games Daily after numerous guest appearances on the show and one on Kinda Funny's flagship podcast The GameOverGreggy Show. Additionally, Whitta has been a co-host for Kinda Funny's Xbox-centric podcast, the Kinda Funny Xcast, since its premiere in July 2020.

In April 2020, Whitta launched a late-night talk show in the form of an online live stream set in the video game Animal Crossing: New Horizons, called Animal Talking. The show has featured several celebrity guests, including Elijah Wood, Brie Larson, and Danny Trejo.

On 21 August 2020, Whitta announced Talk Guys, a talk show based in the game Fall Guys: Ultimate Knockout.

== Personal life ==
Whitta resides in the San Francisco Bay Area, California with his wife Leah, and has two children. In 2009, he became a US citizen.

== Filmography ==
=== As writer ===
==== Film ====
- The Book of Eli (2010)
- After Earth (2013) – Co-wrote the script with M. Night Shyamalan from a story written by Will Smith
- Rogue One: A Star Wars Story (2016) – Co-wrote story only with John Knoll
- Starlight (TBA) - Writer

==== Television ====
- Nerd Court (2015) - 9 episodes
- Star Wars Rebels (2016–2017) – 4 episodes

==== Video games ====
- Prey (2006) – Co-wrote the game
- The Walking Dead: The Game (2012) – Story Consultant & Co-wrote the game with Sean Vanaman and Jake Rodkin
- The Walking Dead: 400 Days (2013) – Co-wrote the game with Sean Ainsworth, Nick Breckon, Mark Darin and Sean Vanaman
- Halo 5: Guardians (2015) - Story Consultant
- The Walking Dead: The Final Season (2018) - Additional Writing
- Forspoken (2023) - Original Concept and Lore Creator

==== Books ====
- Abomination (2015) - Author, writer
- Star Wars: The Last Jedi Adaptation (2018) - Writer
- OLIVER (2019) - Writer
- The Joker 80th Anniversary 100-Page Super Spectacular #1 (2020) – Co-wrote "Kill the Batman" story with Greg Miller
- Gundog, Inkshares, 12 September 2023
