= Jurassic Park: The Game =

2011 episodic adventure video game

- Developer: Telltale Games
- Publisher: Telltale Games
- Directors: Daniel Herrera; Marco Brezzo; Andrew Langley; Nick Herman
- Designers: Joe Pinney; Mark Darin; John Drake; Jonathan Straw
- Programmers: Carl Muckenhoupt; Andrew Langley; Keenan Patterson
- Artist: Dave Bogan
- Writers: Joe Pinney; Mark Darin; Ed Kuehnel; John Drake; Jonathan Straw
- Composer: Jared Emerson-Johnson
- Series: Jurassic Park
- Engine: Telltale Tool
- Platforms: Microsoft Windows, OS X, PlayStation 3, Xbox 360, iOS
- Release: November 15, 2011: Xbox 360; NA: November 15, 2011; Microsoft Windows, OS X; WW: November 15, 2011; PlayStation 3; NA: November 15, 2011; EU: December 2011; iOS; WW: November 2011 (Episode 1)
- Genre: Graphic adventure
- Mode: Single-player

Jurassic Park: The Game is a graphic adventure video game based on the 1993 film Jurassic Park and released for the PlayStation 3, Macintosh, Microsoft Windows, and Xbox 360. The game was developed and published by Telltale Games as part of a licensing deal with Universal Partnerships & Licensing.

The game is set on the fictional island of Isla Nublar, the location of a dinosaur theme park known as Jurassic Park. The game is divided into four episodes, set during and after the events of the film. The plot focuses on the retrieval of a canister of dinosaur embryos, which were stolen by Dennis Nedry during the film and subsequently lost in the jungle. The game was announced in June 2010, and was released in November 2011, receiving mixed reviews from critics.

== Gameplay ==
Jurassic Park: The Game is a point-and-click adventure game that utilizes quick time events (QTEs), in which the player presses a combination of buttons to progress. The player controls various characters throughout the game, which is played across four portions known as "episodes". The game has decision-based objectives and QTEs that affect gameplay.

== Plot ==
=== Episode 1: The Intruder ===
Dr. Gerry Harding, Sarah Harding's father, is the chief veterinarian for the Jurassic Park dinosaur theme park, owned by InGen and located on the tropical island of Isla Nublar. The game begins with Gerry showing his teenage daughter Jess, Sarah's younger sister, around the park. At this time, Dennis Nedry puts his plan into motion to shut down the park's security and escape with stolen dinosaur embryos, hidden inside a modified canister of shaving cream. During a tropical storm, Nedry's two contacts, Nima Cruz and Miles Chadwick, head into the park after he fails to meet them at the dock. After getting past the deactivated fences, they find Nedry's Jeep, and his corpse. They find the embryo canister as well, but are attacked by a pack of Dilophosaurus before they can use Nedry's jeep to escape. Chadwick is killed, but before the Dilophosaurs can kill Nima, they suddenly flee in terror at the sound of unknown dinosaurs with glowing eyes, one of which bites Nima, who leaves the now-damaged jeep and Chadwick's corpse behind and flees through the jungle with the canister and Chadwick's gun.

On their way to the dock, Gerry and Jess encounter Nima, who is now delirious from the bite and needs medical attention. They drive to the Visitor Center, but are delayed by a juvenile Triceratops blocking the road. When Gerry and Jess get the dinosaur back into its enclosure, the alpha-female Triceratops appears and mistakes them as a threat, attacking their Jeep. The park's T. rex has escaped its paddock and approaches the Triceratops. While the two dinosaurs fight, the humans hide in a nearby maintenance shed, where they spend the night. Dr. Laura Sorkin, a park scientist who became trapped in a field research lab due to the storm destroying the access road, sees Gerry, Jess and Nima on a security feed the next morning, and sends an automated tour vehicle to pick them up. The three reach the abandoned Visitor Center (in which the characters from the movie have already evacuated at this point), and Gerry speaks with Sorkin through a radio. Sorkin instructs Gerry on how to cure Nima of her ailment using a tranquilizer dart. The T. rex enters the Visitor Center and attempts to attack the humans, but Gerry instructs Sorkin to activate the tour vehicle, which lures the dinosaur away. When Nima learns of a rescue team heading to the island, she pulls her gun on the Hardings and tells them there will not be a rescue.

=== Episode 2: The Cavalry ===
InGen hires a team of mercenaries to rescue survivors left on Isla Nublar. The team consists of leader William "Billy" Yoder, his sidekick and partner Oscar Morales, and their pilot Daniel "Danny" Cafaro (aka "D-Caf"). They head to the Visitor Center to meet with Bravo team, their backup unit, but when they try to radio, all they hear is gunfire. Arriving at the site, they find the entire team dead aside for one member, Vargas, who has gone crazy and tries to attack them. After they subdue Vargas, Yoder and Oscar notice a strange wound on Vargas' arm, speculating that a venomous animal bite caused him to hallucinate and kill his own men. As they examine the building's security recordings hoping to find out what attacked Vargas, they find footage of Nima marching Gerry and Jess out of the building at gunpoint. The Visitor Center is once again attacked by unknown dinosaurs, which kill Vargas as Oscar and Yoder rush back to their chopper. Meanwhile, Nima, Gerry and Jess take a break while hiking through the woods. Gerry convinces Nima to let him start a fire by claiming the smoke will keep any dinosaurs away, secretly hoping the rescue team will be able to see it. Later, while Gerry questions Nima about her family, Jess manages to steal a radio and contacts Yoder, but is suddenly caught by Nima and forced to keep moving.

Yoder's team see the smoke from Gerry's fire, but a Pteranodon attacks their helicopter, forcing them to make an emergency landing. While D-Caf tries to repair the chopper, Yoder and Oscar head into the jungle to locate their targets. Nima's group reaches a dead end at the Bone Shaker, an unfinished roller coaster built into the side of a cliff, in which a thousand-year-old stone staircase had been destroyed for the coaster's construction. The trio gets the ride operational and attempt to ride it down to the base of the cliff, but as they do so, they are attacked by a pack of Herrerasaurus. They manage to ward them off, but the coaster cars nearly run off the damaged tracks in the process. Yoder and Oscar locate them and disarm Nima, although she implies that she has met Oscar before as an old rival. The group returns to the helicopter, but find that D-Caf has disappeared. The T. rex reappears and makes its way towards them, forcing Oscar to fix the chopper himself. They lift off just in time.

Dr. Sorkin is the last rescue target, and they head out to the field lab to pick her up. En route, Nima gets into an argument with Oscar, clearly having history with him, but Gerry stops the fight once the group reaches the lab and meets with Dr. Sorkin. However, Sorkin refuses to leave with them, forcing Yoder to convince her by exploiting her desire for Isla Nublar to become a wildlife preserve for the dinosaurs. She finally concedes, but before leaving, she wants to put an experimental cure for the dinosaurs' engineered lysine deficiency into the Parasaurolophus water supply to keep the dinosaur group she has been studying from dying off while she is away. As she, Gerry and Jess do this, Nima tries to hijack the helicopter and escape. Yoder and Oscar intercept her, but in the scuffle, a thrown knife damages the controls. Meanwhile, Sorkin's group is attacked by a pack of Velociraptors which had recently been shipped to the park from a nearby island known as Site B and subsequently escaped their containment pens. The raptors force the group to take refuge atop the water tower. They spot the helicopter and call for help, only for the chopper to crash into the tower.

=== Episode 3: The Depths ===
Dr. Sorkin's group escapes the falling water tower by fixing a damaged ladder and fleeing into the maintenance tunnels to escape the raptors. Nima, Yoder and Oscar survive the chopper crash, but all of the mercenaries' weapons are destroyed when the wreckage catches fire. Oscar scouts the area ahead, leaving Yoder to guard the unconscious Nima. Oscar sees the raptors opening the door to the tunnels, and he follows them inside, successfully managing to kill a lone individual after engaging it in combat. Meanwhile, Yoder finds the embryo canister in Nima's backpack, and when she regains consciousness, she is forced to make a deal with Yoder to split the profits from the embryo delivery. The T. rex reappears, forcing them to hide in the tunnels as well, although Yoder is forced to go back out to get the canister after accidentally dropping it. Yoder and Nima proceed through the tunnels, but Nima sees glowing eyes in the dark and refuses to continue without a better light source than the red emergency lights. After Yoder powers up the main lights, he and Nima find Oscar and reveal their plan to sell the stolen embryos. Oscar, while hesitant, agrees to go along with it on the condition that he and Yoder complete their original mission to evacuate the other survivors.

Meanwhile, Dr. Sorkin reveals to Gerry that she actually put her lysine deficiency cure into the park's main water supply instead of just the holding pens, which will eventually cure all the dinosaurs and eliminate Jurassic Park's lysine contingency entirely. As the two of them argue over the ethical implications of Dr. Sorkin's actions, Jess sneaks away with Sorkin's cigarettes, hoping to have a smoke. A Velociraptor attacks her, forcing her to flee back to Gerry and Sorkin, leading the rest of the raptor pack right to them. They are able to fight the dinosaurs off with the help of a forklift until the others arrive, with Oscar intervening by wounding one of the pack members with his knife and causing the raptors to retreat. Soon after, steam jets begin escaping from the nearby valves. Dr. Sorkin explains that this means that the park's power plant is on the verge of an explosion, and will have to be reset manually before it goes off.

Now regrouped, the survivors head to the power plant to reset the main grid. The group work together to get inside the plant, release the built-up steam pressure and reset the system, but in the process trigger a safety protocol that begins sealing the entire plant behind heavy metal blast doors. However, the raptors get in just before the doors can fully close, trapping the survivors inside with the dinosaurs. The group heads to the upper level to escape the raptors, but realize that the door controls on their level are burned out, meaning someone will have to go back down to the lower level and use the panel there while it is guarded by the raptors. Seeing no other option, Oscar volunteers, and manages to fight off the raptors long enough to reach the panel and reopen the doors at the cost of his own life, to Yoder's horror. The rest of the group runs into the boiler room and seal themselves in. The pursuing raptors then flee in fear, with Sorkin deducing that something about the boiler room scares them. The group then finds the body of a man covered in what looks like a nest. Yoder identifies him as D-Caf, alive but paralyzed and brain-dead from the same poison that affected Nima and Vargas, with dinosaur eggs laid in his abdomen. Sorkin reveals that she knew the creatures who did this had gotten loose, and Yoder, angry that she withheld this, grabs her and draws his knife, threatening to kill her.

=== Episode 4: The Survivors ===
At knife-point, Sorkin says that the dinosaurs responsible for D-Caf's fate were Troodons, explaining she had been ordered to exterminate them after their venomous bite had been discovered, but could not bring herself to do it, keeping them alive in the quarantine pens for study instead. As Gerry and Nima try to convince Yoder to let Dr. Sorkin live, Jess discovers a grate leading back into the maintenance tunnels. As they try to open the grate, the Troodon pack returns to their nest and attacks. Yoder and Nima struggle to hold them back as the group break open the grate. They flee from the Troodon through the tunnels, but the group becomes separated. Gerry and Nima make their way to the surface, but everyone else remains trapped in the tunnels. Gerry tries to go back for Jess and the others, but Nima convinces him they can take care of themselves. During the small break, the two strike up a conversation, with Nima revealing that Isla Nublar was actually the ancestral home of her tribe before InGen bought it out, forcibly removed the native villagers, and built Jurassic Park. She explains that Oscar was one of the InGen mercenaries who originally evicted her people from the island, and she took the job of stealing the embryos for revenge, as well as the hope that the money would help her provide a better life for her daughter. The passing and partly damaged tour car from earlier gets their attention, and they use it to head for the park's marine exhibit, which they conclude is the others' most likely destination.

The two groups reunite at the marine exhibit, where Yoder explains that they all need to get off the island soon, as the U.S. Navy intends to bomb the island on InGen's behalf to eliminate the threat of potential escaped dinosaurs. Upon hearing this, Dr. Sorkin abandons the group and takes an elevator down to the underwater aquarium, leaving the others stranded topside. The others unlock the elevator and follow her down, where they overhear her on the phone arguing with InGen over the impending bombing, lying that the other survivors are her hostages to get the bombing called off and locks off the elevator. When that does not seem to work, she releases a captive Tylosaurus into the lagoon, despite Gerry's pleading. The newly freed Tylosaurus slams into the side of the facility, knocking Dr. Sorkin into the moon pool and devours her. Yoder calls his employers and has them delay the bombing, but as the group makes their way back to the elevator, he pulls out a grenade he took from D-Caf's body, explaining that with both his teammates dead, he only cares about delivering the embryos after Nedry's failed attempt, and does not want the Hardings slowing him down. He offers to take Nima along, but she, disgusted by Yoder's betrayal, refuses. Yoder throws the grenade as he escapes to the surface, which cracks the facility's windows when it goes off, causing water to pour in. As the elevator ascends, however, Yoder realizes that the embryos are gone, stolen by Jess while he was not looking.

Gerry and the others seal themselves in the aquarium's control room before the rotunda above floods completely, only to find that the damaged pressure seal on the door is causing the moon pool to slowly flood their room as well. Nima notices that the only way out is through a sea cave in the wall of the lagoon, which she remembers from her childhood, that will take them directly to the surface. Donning scuba gear, the three make their way through the water and into the cave, narrowly avoiding the mosasaur in the process while following some pipes. They eventually reach the surface and head for the docks, where Nima's contacts left a boat waiting after Nedry's failed delivery, the driver presumably fallen victim to a dinosaur while waiting. Upon their arrival, they are attacked by Yoder. As Nima and Yoder fight, the T. rex arrives and devours him. Gerry distracts the T. rex so the others can escape, but the dinosaur damages the skywalk Nima and Jess are on. As Jess clings to the railing, the canister falls to the ground below.

The player is then allowed to choose whether Nima goes to save Jess or the embryos.

- If the player decides that Nima should save Jess, she pulls her up while the T. rex steps on the embryo canister, crushing it. After evading the dinosaur's attacks, Gerry, along with Jess and Nima, escape the island together. As they sail off, Nima worries how she will take care of her daughter without the money the embryos would have brought her, but Jess manages to find a large case of money in the boat - presumably the payment she would have received for the embryos - implying that everything will work out in the end.
- If Nima goes to retrieve the embryos however, she is devoured by the T. rex while Gerry and Jess escape the island on a boat, with the former deciding to return to his old job as a regular zoo veterinarian so that he can be closer to Jess. He also mentions taking care of Nima's daughter, perhaps even adopting her on Nima's behalf.

== Characters ==
- Gerry Harding: (voiced by Jon Curry) The veterinarian of the park. He is the father of Sarah and Jess Harding. In the beginning of the game, which took place after he brought a sick Triceratops for treatment, he appeared with his daughter Jess to accompany her exploring the park. He missed the last boat and thus stranded on Isla Nublar with his daughter, which was made worse by the failure of the park's security systems. Throughout the game, he sought to protect his daughter from the dinosaurs that attacked them. He survived the events of the game and managed to flee the island with Jess and determinately, Nima (if she was alive, depending on the player's choices).
- Nima Cruz: (voiced by Nika Futterman) One of the two mercenaries working for Biosyn's leader Lewis Dodgson (a rival of John Hammond in the novel). She was sent to retrieve the dinosaur embryos with her partner Miles Chadwick after Dennis Nedry failed to appear. Throughout the film, she kept the embryos with her safely, with the purpose to get a large sum of money in order to provide a better life for her young daughter Atlanta. It was revealed in the midst of the game's finale that Nima was a member of a native tribe that used to reside on Isla Nublar before InGen took away the island from her tribe to build Jurassic Park. Her final fate was to be determined by the player's choice to save Jess or not.
- Jess Harding: (voiced by Heather Hudson) Full name Jessica Marie Harding. Jess is the teenage, but rebellious second daughter of Gerry, who also had another daughter named Sarah Harding (who did not appear in the game), who is Jess's older sister. Jess was a delinquent who often engage in habits like smoking, stealing, shop lifting and even go learn scuba diving behind Gerry's back, much to Gerry's dissatisfaction. Despite her flaws, she was still a good-hearted person and would show concern for people around her.
- Laura Sorkin: (voiced by Susan Cash) A scientist of the park who developed a special bond for the dinosaurs and who cared for their welfare. She, like Gerry and the others, were stranded on Isla Nublar after missing the last boat out of the island. While she was friendly with Gerry and Jess, her concern for the dinosaurs and stubborn attempts to exercise her own moral code sometimes led to her disregard the safety of others and herself, and the stability and safety of the ecosystem (notably the later half of the series), which led to her being eaten by the Tylosaurus.
- Billy Yoder: (voiced by Jason Marsden) Real name William Yoder. Billy was the leader of the mercenary team sent by InGen to rescue any stranded survivors from Isla Nublar before an air strike was to be sent to destroy the island by bombing. Billy, who was saddled with debts prior to the film, was shown to be greedy when he accepted the offer by Nima Cruz to share the large sum of money to be received by delivering the dinosaur embryos. He was ultimately shown to be unethical to an extent that he was willing to go as far as to sacrifice the Hardings and Nima to not let them get in his way of delivering the embryos. Nima despises him more than Oscar for this. He later gotten his comeuppance for the attempted murders of the Hardings and Nima when he got devoured by the T. rex. Despite his flaws, he was shown to be genuinely concerned for Oscar.
- Oscar Morales: (voiced by Carlos Carrasco) A partner of Billy. He was shown to be physically strong, tall and muscular with his left arm full of tattoos. He also demonstrated great strength when he managed to kill a raptor with his knife. Oscar was revealed to be was one of the InGen mercenaries who originally evicted Nima and her people from Isla Nublar, and had also presumably killed a few of her tribesmen, which led to Nima harbouring hatred towards him. His tattoos were signifying the people who were killed by him, as a way possibly to remind himself of what he did, demonstrating possible regret for his misdeeds. Unlike Billy, Oscar was shown to be concerned of the survivors' welfare and willingly gave his life up to the raptors to allow them to escape from the island. Despite her hatred towards Oscar, Nima grew to respect Oscar after seeing him sacrificing himself to enable the survivors' escape.
- D-Caf: (voiced by Ari Rubin) Real name Daniel Cafaro. He was a teammate of Billy and Oscar and their pilot who mysteriously disappeared in the middle of the game, and before the final episode, D-Caf was confirmed to be alive, but brain-dead when his body was found in a nest with dinosaur eggs laid inside his body; his state was because of the venom from the bite of Troodons, the same venom that affected Nima and Vargas. He was possibly dead in the end, and his body was presumably never recovered.
- Vargas: A member of the backup team sent to assist Bill's team. He was bitten by Troodons, and thus suffered from poisoning as induced by the dinosaur venom that affected Nima in the beginning of the game, which caused him to lose his mind and kill the whole backup team before Billy's team managed to take him down and check his bite. Vargas was later killed by an unknown dinosaur attacking Billy's team, presumably the Troodons.
- Miles Chadwick: (voiced by Jared Emerson-Johnson) One of the two mercenaries working for Biosyn's leader Lewis Dodgson (a rival of John Hammond in the novel). He was sent to retrieve the dinosaur embryos with his partner Nima after Dennis Nedry failed to appear. He was killed by the Dilophosaurus shortly after the duo's discovery of Nedry's corpse and the shaving cream container containing the dinosaur embryos.

== Development ==
In June 2010, Telltale Games announced a deal with Universal Partnerships & Licensing to develop a video game based on the Jurassic Park series. Joel Dreskin, the director of marketing for Telltale, said that Universal "didn't want another dinosaur shooting game. That's something from their side that interested them in Telltale Games as a partner for the property". Development was already underway at the time of the announcement, at which point there was a possibility of actors from the film series reprising their roles for the game.

The game was developed as a direct sequel to the first film. Telltale worked with some of the film's creators to ensure the game would be accurate, and the development team studied the films to recreate their appearance and pacing. Universal allowed Telltale a large amount of creative freedom in developing the game, and also provided a wealth of dinosaur sound effects from the films. Gerry Harding, who had a minor part in the first film, is the only character to return for the game, while the others are original characters created by Telltale. The game includes portions of Jurassic Park that were not seen in the film, including tunnels and a marine exhibit.

The dinosaurs' behavior was based on that of present-day animals, as well as dinosaur behavior featured in the Jurassic Park films. A paleontologist, Kevin Padian, also advised the development team on possible dinosaur behavior. The gameplay was heavily influenced by the 2010 video game Heavy Rain. It is the first game by Telltale in which the player's character can be killed.

== Release ==
When the game was announced, it was to be published shortly after the release of a new Back to the Future video game, which was scheduled to go on sale in winter 2010. The game was to be published for Microsoft Windows, Macintosh, and unspecified home video game consoles. The first images from the game were released in January 2011. The game's title and a trailer were unveiled a month later, with a planned release date of April 2011 for the first of several downloadable episodes.

The game was delayed until fall 2011. Telltale co-founder Dan Connors said: "The game's mechanics and storytelling have come together in such a way that we see great potential, so much so that we feel we can push these elements to the next level if we spend some extra time working on them". People who pre-ordered the game were given a refund and the choice of a free Telltale game. Telltale specified the home game consoles on which the game would be released: PlayStation 3 and Xbox 360. The Xbox 360 version would be released as a physical disc with all episodes, while the game would be released as individual downloadable episodes for the other platforms.

The game was shown at the Electronic Entertainment Expo in June 2011. In August, a release date of November 15, 2011 was planned for the PlayStation 3, Xbox 360 and computer versions, while a release date for an iPad 2 version of the game was still undetermined. In the United States, the game was released as scheduled, although the Xbox 360 and PlayStation 3 versions were delayed in Europe. All episodes for the European PC and Mac versions were released as planned, and the first episode was released that month for iPad.

The European PlayStation 3 version launched on the PlayStation Network in December, with no reason given for the delay. The European Xbox 360 version was delayed as Telltale did not have a publishing office in Europe. Telltale had self-published the console's American version. Telltale announced that Kalypso Media would publish the Xbox 360 game in early 2012 in Europe, the Middle East and Africa, where Kalypso would also publish the Microsoft Windows version in a retail form rather than its downloadable form. In January 2012, Kalypso announced that it would no longer release a boxed retail version of the Xbox 360 game in the United Kingdom, which would only receive a retail PC version scheduled for release on February 24, 2012.

== Reception ==
Reception

Aggregate score
Aggregator	Score				
Aggregator	General	iOS	PC	PS3	Xbox 360
Metacritic			54/100	53/100	60/100

Review scores
Publication	Score				
Publication	General	iOS	PC	PS3	Xbox 360
1Up.com	D+				
Adventure Gamers	3/5				
Eurogamer			4/10		
Game Informer					5.5/10
GamePro				2.5/5	
GameSpot			6.5/10	6/10	
GameSpy			3/5		
GamesRadar+	3/5				
IGN			5.5/10	5.5/10	
Joystiq	2/5				
PlayStation Official Magazine – Australia				40/100	
PlayStation Official Magazine – UK				4/10	
Official Xbox Magazine (US)					6/10
PALGN			4/10		
PC Gamer (UK)			41/100		
Play				32/100	
Digital Spy			3/5		
Official PlayStation; Magazine Benelux				51/100	
PlayStation: The Official Magazine				50/100	
Pocket Gamer		5/10			
TouchArcade		2/5			

Jurassic Park: The Game received "Mixed or average reviews" according to aggregating review website Metacritic.

IGN's Greg Miller said of the game: "Jurassic Park is a meandering tale of forgettable characters getting lost in a park that is far less wondrous than the one we saw on the silver screen".

Carolyin Petit from GameSpot stated that while it was "fun to watch Jurassic Park's story play out, the cinematic adventure wasn't much fun to actually play". While she praised the use of the source material, she criticized the lack of challenging puzzles and lack of context for conversation options. She concluded her review comparing the game progression to the "cars on rigid tracks, offering no control where it goes or how it gets there. You're just along for the ride".

However, Richard Cobbett of PC Gamer gave the game an unfavorable review, calling the game "a barely interactive movie that asks nothing of you but the most basic of motor functions", taking issue with the gameplay taking a back seat to the plot, which he described as "a hammy but watchable sequel to the first movie".

Development staff at Telltale Games wrote favourable user reviews for the game on Metacritic without disclosing their affiliation to the game. In the United States, Jurassic Park: The Game was the sixth best-selling PlayStation Network game for November 2011. In 2015, Eurogamer stated that the game's material would have worked better for a film, calling it a "great" sequel "embodied in a subpar game".
