= Joseph Coleman =

Joseph Coleman may refer to:

- Joseph Coleman (Tennessee politician) (d. 1819), first mayor of Nashville
- Joseph E. Coleman (1922–2000), American politician, attorney and chemist
- Joseph James Coleman (1838–1888), credited with invention of a mechanical dry-air refrigeration process
- Joseph T. Coleman, American football player and coach
- Lil JoJo, (1994–2012), American rapper born as Joseph Coleman

== See also ==
- Joe Coleman (disambiguation)
