= Dave Fennoy =

American voice actor

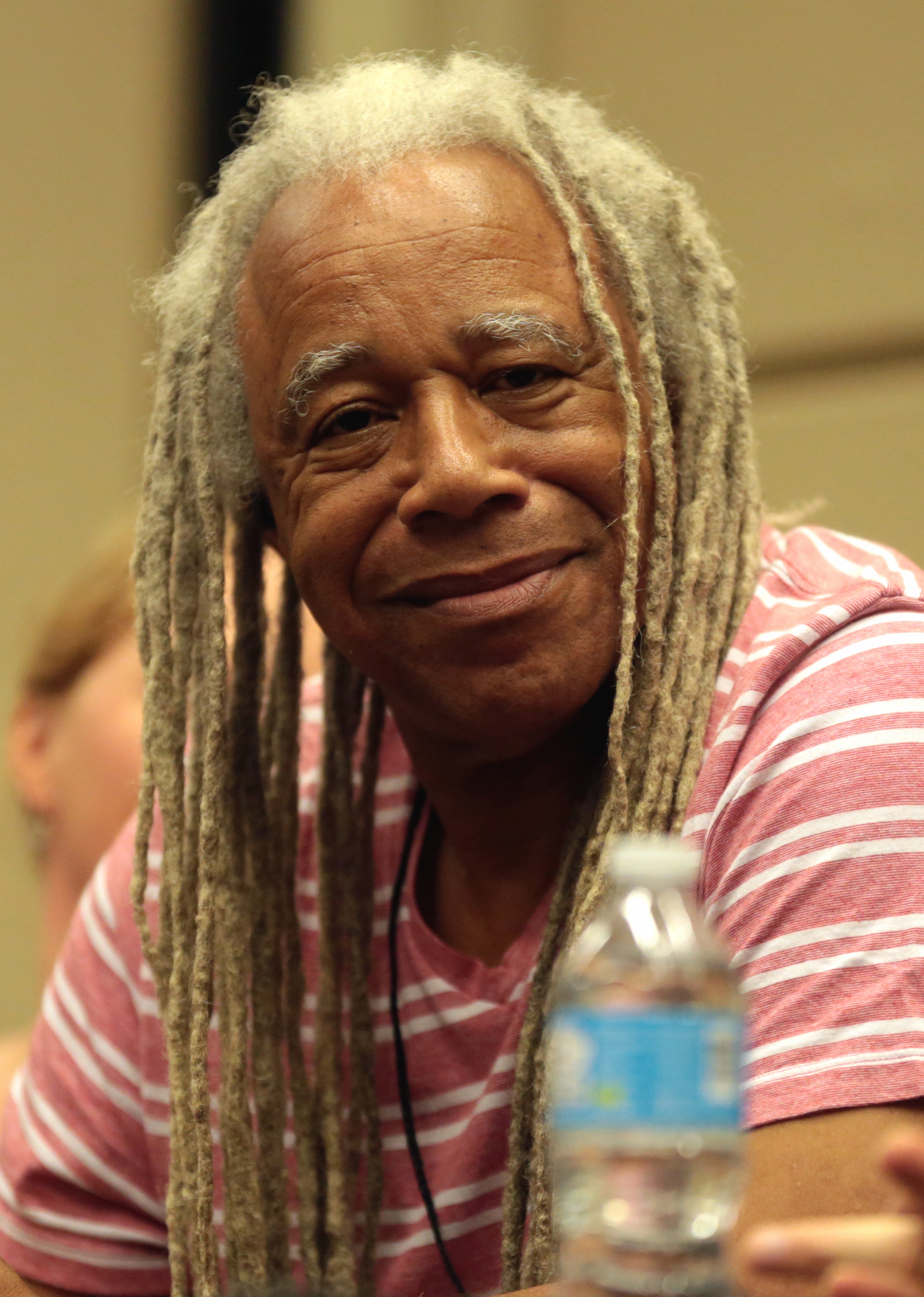
- Fennoy in Phoenix, Arizona, 2017
- Occupation: Voice actor
- Years active: 1990–present
- Known for: The Walking Dead as Lee Everett; Batman as Lucius Fox; The Wolf Among Us as Bluebeard; Ben 10 as Tetrax Shard; RWBY as Dr. Pietro Polendina and Dr. Merlot

Dave Fennoy is an American voice actor. His video game roles have included Lee Everett in The Walking Dead, Bluebeard in The Wolf Among Us, Finch in Tales from the Borderlands, Gabriel the Warrior in Minecraft: Story Mode, Lucius Fox in Batman: Arkham Knight, Batman: Arkham Shadow, Batman: The Telltale Series, and Batman: The Enemy Within and Rodin in Bayonetta. He also voiced "JP Dumund" in the Vendettas mode in The Darkness 2, as well as Satan in Afterparty.

== Early life ==
Fennoy grew up in Cleveland, Ohio and was a child actor at the Karamu House. In his senior year of high school, he was president of the theater club and directed as well as performed in several plays, before attending Macalester College in St Paul Minnesota as a theater major. Fennoy left college when he began touring as a professional musician. He later returned and graduated from Howard University with a degree in jazz studies and a guitar minor.

== Career ==
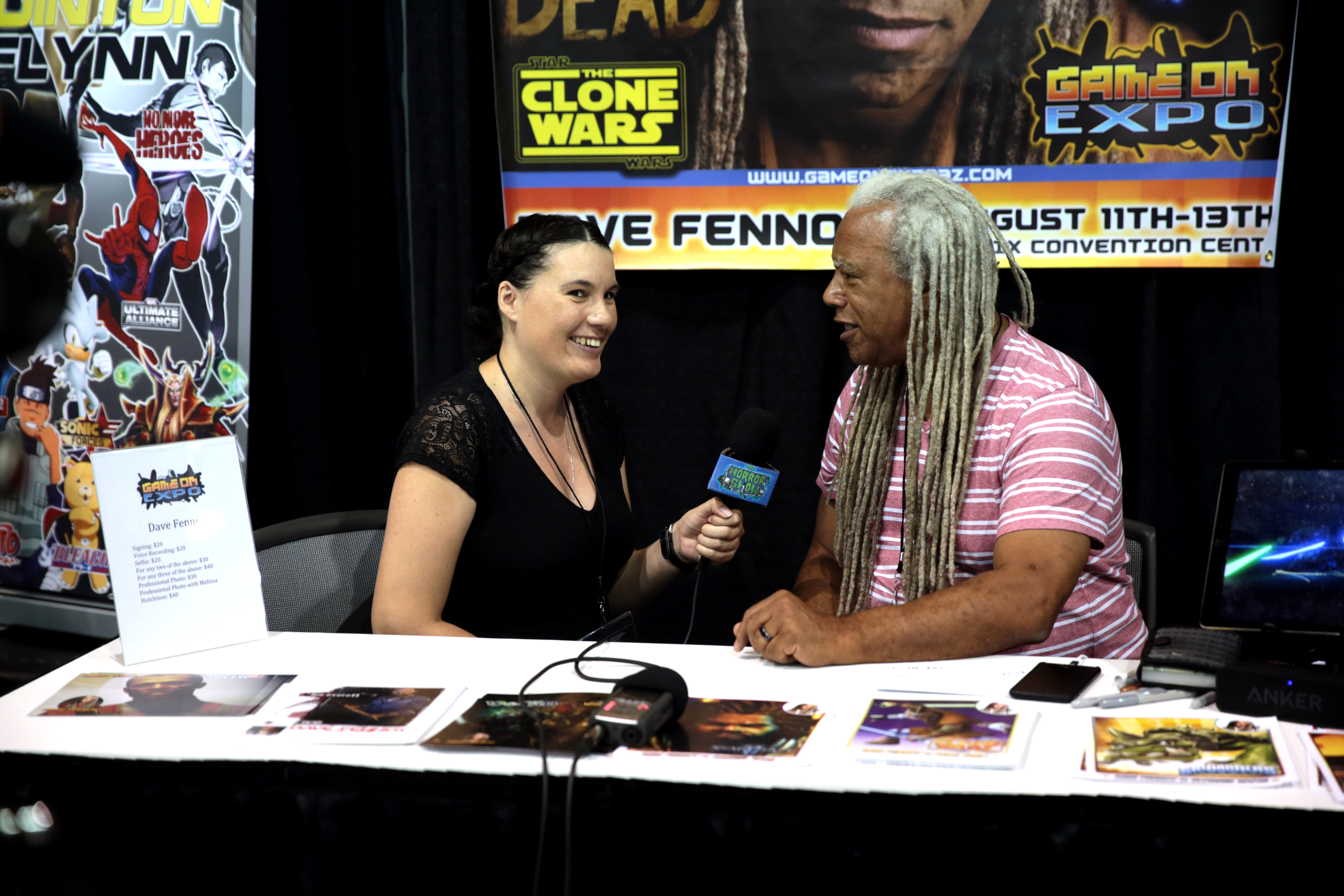
Fennoy being interviewed at the 2017 Game On Expo in Phoenix, Arizona

Fennoy started as a DJ in the San Francisco bay area when he first became interested in voiceover work. He created a demo tape, which was seen by Joan Spangler, a talent agent in San Francisco, who signed him. He booked his first audition, a spot for the California Lottery; however, after quick success, things slowed down to a near halt. He began taking voiceover classes to remedy the situation. In 1989, an agent by the name of Leigh Gilbert invited Fennoy to sign with her agency in Los Angeles. He turned the offer down, as he was the morning DJ at local radio station KSOL at the time.

In February 1990, the radio station fired Fennoy, so he contacted Gilbert and moved to Los Angeles. Once there, he began voicing commercials, television promos and cartoons. One of his first jobs was as the voice of RoboCop in a telephonic RoboCop game. In 1990, he voiced his first character in an animated series, Dick Scott in New Kids on the Block. The following year, he voiced Bo Jackson in ProStars. In 2008, Fennoy began doing the five second voice-overs in the beginning of Hulu video clips. ("The following program is brought to you with limited commercial interruption by...")

== Filmography ==
=== Animation ===
List of voice performances in animation
Year	Title	Role	Notes	Source
1990	New Kids on the Block	Dick Scott	15 episodes	
1991	Darkwing Duck	Additional Voices	Episode: "Jail Bird"; Credited as David Fenoy	
1991	ProStars	Bo Jackson	13 episodes	
1992	Captain Planet and the Planeteers	Coach	Episode: "A Formula for Hate"	
1993	Bonkers	Additional Voices	Episode: "Weather or Not"	
1994	Aladdin	Man	Episode: "Bad Mood Rising"	
1994	Where on Earth Is Carmen Sandiego?	Additional Voices	10 episodes	
1994	Problem Child	Additional Voices	13 episodes	
1995	ABC Weekend Special	Feather-brained boy	Episode: "Jirimpimbira: An African Folk Tale"	
1995	What-a-Mess	Additional Voices	3 episodes	
1995	Dumb and Dumber: The Animated Series	Cop #1, Kid #2	Episode: "Dixie Dolts/Neither Rain Nor Sleet Nor Dumbness"	
1996	Teenage Mutant Ninja Turtles	Alvin Huxley	Episode: "Mobster from Dimension X"	
1996	The Real Adventures of Jonny Quest	Clark, Guard	Episode: "Race Against Danger"	
1996-1997	Bruno the Kid	Additional Voices	2 episodes	
1997	Spicy City	Additional Voices	Episode: "Raven's Revenge"	
1999–2000	Rocket Power	Announcer, Assistant	2 episodes	
2004	Kim Possible	Exterminator	Episode: "Rewriting History"	
2006	Ben 10	Tetrax, Radio Newscaster, Doctor	2 episodes	
2009	The Secret Saturdays	Mayor	Episode: "Something in the Water"	
2010	Ben 10: Alien Force	Tetrax	Episode: "The Secret of Chromastone"	
2011	The LeBrons	Otis the Lion	Episode: "Lion"	
2011	Star Wars: The Clone Wars	Pong Krell	4 episodes	
2012	Archer	George, Commander Kellogg	3 episodes	
2013	Ben 10: Omniverse	Tetrax Shard (Dimension 23)	Episode: "Store 23"	
2015	Shimmer and Shine	Neighbor	Episode: "A Very Genie Halloweenie"	
2015–16	Mixels	Globert, Boogly, Krog, Kramm, King, Sergeant	3 episodes	
2015–16	Guardians of the Galaxy	Korath the Pursuer, Lead Guard, Chitauri Gunner	5 episodes	
2016	Transformers: Robots in Disguise	Overload	3 episodes	
2017	Be Cool, Scooby-Doo!	Meldon	Episode: "Ghost in the Mystery Machine"	
2017	Star Wars Rebels	Kryze Pilot, Lead Eldar Warrior, Stormtrooper	Episode: "Heroes of Mandalore: Part 2"	
2017–19	OK K.O.! Let's Be Heroes	Bernard, Spanky, Ofrang, Kappa, Guard, Jad, Tree, Nerd #1, Security Guard #2	7 episodes	
2019–present	RWBY	Dr. Pietro Polendina		
2020	Barbie Dreamhouse Adventures	Francois	Episode: "Chicken Masked Mystery On Ice"	
2022	Cars on the Road	Town Marshall, Justice Stern	2 episodes	
2023	Fright Krewe	Aloysius Grey		

=== Live-action ===
List of acting performances in film and television
Year	Title	Role	Notes	Source
1993	Reasonable Doubts	Sgt. Mally	Episode: "Legacy"	
1993	Murder, She Wrote	TV Interviewer	Episode: "Threshold of Fear"	
1998	Men in White	Glaxxon (voice)	Television film	
2004	Joan of Arcadia	Poet	Episode: "Requiem for a Third Grade Ashtray"	
2004	Medical Investigation	Flute Musician	Episode: "Alienation"	
2005	King's Ransom	Radio DJ (voice)		
2008	Diary of a Tired Black Man	Guy with Dreads		
2012	Raising Hope	Barry	Episode: "The Last Christmas"	
2015	Henry Danger	Henry Hart (deep voice)	Episode: "Captain Jerk"	
2016	Mom	Narrator	Episode: "Sticky Hands and a Walk on the Wild Side"	
2016	Bad Internet	Commercial Voiceover	Web series Episode: "The Year-Long Ad Experience"	
2020	Young Sheldon	Thoth (voice)	Episode: "A Baby Tooth and the Egyptian God of Knowledge"	

=== Film ===
List of voice performances in direct-to-video, feature and television films
Year	Title	Role	Notes	Source
1998	Gen^{13}	Additional Voices		
2006	Ultimate Avengers 2: Rise of the Panther	T'Chaka		
2007	Ben 10: Secret of the Omnitrix	Tetrax Shard, Alien #1, Prisoner #2		
2012	Ben 10: Destroy All Aliens	Tetrax Shard	Television film	
2012	Strange Frame	Yapnetanchor Noiz		
2013	Bayonetta: Bloody Fate	Rodin	English dub	
2015	The Laws of the Universe Part 0	Tokuo Yanase	English dub	
2017	The Nut Job 2: Nutty by Nature	Mouse Henchman #2		
2017	Deep	Additional Voices	Uncredited	
2018	Suicide Squad: Hell to Pay	Blockbuster, Tobias Whale		
2018	Incredibles 2	Additional Voices		
2020	Barbie: Princess Adventure	Alfonso		

=== Video games ===
List of voice performances in video games
Year	Title	Role	Notes	Source
1992	King's Quest VI	Pawnshop Owner		
1993	Leisure Suit Larry 6: Shape Up or Slip Out!	Mark, Billy Dee		
1997	The Curse of Monkey Island	King Andre, Pirate #3		
1999	Star Wars: X-Wing Alliance	Dunari, Lando Calrissian		
2000	Star Wars Episode I: Racer	Toy Dampner		
2000	Tachyon: The Fringe	Commander Alberion Obulo		
2004	World of Warcraft	Vol'jin		
2005	Ultimate Spider-Man	Nick Fury		
2005	Viewtiful Joe: Red Hot Rumble	Hulk Davidson, Fire Leo, Kuwaga		
2006	Saints Row	Marcel/Stilwater's Residents		
2006	Project Sylpheed	Raymond Logan		
2006	Spider-Man: Battle for New York	Nick Fury		
2007	Tomb Raider: Anniversary	Kin "Kold" Kade		
2008	Metal Gear Solid 4: Guns of the Patriots	Ed		
2008	Rise of the Argonauts	Daedalus		
2008	Too Human	Troy, Traitor Leader		
2009	Cartoon Network Universe: FusionFall	Tetrax Shard		
2009	Prototype	Additional Voices		
2009	Ratchet & Clank Future: A Crack in Time	Maximilian Zane		
2009	Bayonetta	Rodin, Sapientia, Additional Voices		
2010	Mass Effect 2	Warlord Okeer, Ronald Taylor, Tarak, Turian Commuter		
2010	Star Trek Online	Kagran		
2010	Metal Gear Solid: Peace Walker	Soldiers		
2010	StarCraft II: Wings of Liberty	Gabriel Tosh		
2010	Mafia II	Sammy Stevens		
2010	Fallout: New Vegas	Jed Masterson	Honest Hearts DLC	
2011	Transformers: Dark of the Moon	Warpath		
2011	Driver: San Francisco	Additional voices		
2011	Saints Row: The Third	Pedestrians		
2011	Law & Order: Legacies	Dr. Montrose		
2012	The Darkness II	JP Dumond		
2012	The Walking Dead	Lee Everett	Main role 5 episodes	
2012	Zen Pinball 2	Lee Everett		
2012	Lollipop Chainsaw	Josey		
2012	The Secret World	Zuberi, Vampire Hunter		
2012	Guild Wars 2	Captain Rahim, Nicabar Steelweaver		
2013	Marvel Heroes	Blade	Uncredited	
2013	Dota 2	Batrider, Ember Spirit, Faceless Void, Huskar, Jakiro, Venomancer, Wraith King		
2013	The Bureau: XCOM Declassified	Outsider Grunt, Additional voices		
2013	Grand Theft Auto V	The Local Population		
2013	Infinity Blade III	Therin, Additional voices		
2013	The Wolf Among Us	Bluebeard		
2013	Batman: Arkham Origins	Enforcers		
2013	The Walking Dead: Season Two	Lee Everett	Uncredited; Episode: "No Going Back"	
2013–16	Skylanders series	Thunderbolt, Slobber Tooth		
2014	Infamous Second Son	Concrete Knight		
2014	The Elder Scrolls Online	Additional voices		
2014	Transformers: Rise of the Dark Spark	Decepticon Shotgunner, Lockdown Gunner		
2014	Bayonetta 2	Rodin, Sapientia		
2014	Dreamfall Chapters	Likho		
2014	Vainglory	Baptiste		
2014	Tales from the Borderlands	Finch, Additional voices		
2015	Evolve	Additional voices		
2015	Batman: Arkham Knight	Lucius Fox		
2015	Lego Dimensions	B. A. Baracus, M. A. Maracus, Agent Hawkins		
2015	Minecraft: Story Mode	Gabriel the Warrior		
2015	Fallout 4	Max Loken, Malcolm Latimer		
2015	Street Fighter V	Oro, Azam, Taylor		
2016	RWBY: Grimm Eclipse	Dr. Merlot		
2016	Batman: The Telltale Series	Lucius Fox		
2016	2064: Read Only Memories	Narrator		
2016	Duke Grabowski: Mighty Swashbuckler!	LL Seet T, Sheriff Deputy, Pirates, Yoloti		
2016	Mafia III	Charles Laveau		
2016	Enderal: The Shards of Order	The Black Guardian, Maél Dal'Loran		
2016	Final Fantasy XV	Weskham Armaugh		
2017	Horizon Zero Dawn	Additional Voices		
2017	Fortnite: Save the World	Director Riggs		
2017	Friday the 13th: The Game	Detective Joe Maddery		
2017	LawBreakers	Additional voices		
2017	Batman: The Enemy Within	Lucius Fox		
2017	SpellForce 3	Gor		
2018	Where the Water Tastes Like Wine	Shaw		
2018	State of Decay 2	Sydney Clement		
2018	Lego The Incredibles	Judge		
2018	Sushi Striker: The Way of Sushido	Jinrai, Narrator		
2018	Marvel's Spider-Man	Howard		
2018	Fallout 76	Super Mutants, Derek Castle, Parker		
2018	Darksiders III	Abraxis, Usiel, Human		
2018	Super Smash Bros. Ultimate	Rodin	Archive audio	
2019	The Walking Dead: The Final Season	Lee Everett	Episode: "Broken Toys"	
2019	Crackdown 3	Djimon Keita		
2019	Gears 5	Jeremiah Keegan		
2019	Rage 2	Rick Trans, Abadon Mutants		
2019	Remnant: From the Ashes	Male Voice 2, Reggie		
2019	Enderal: Forgotten Stories	Maél dal'Loran, The Black Guardian		
2019	Concrete Genie	Creatures	Credited as David Fennoy	
2019	Afterparty	Satan		
2020	Fallout 76: Wastelanders	Grahm, Munch		
2020	G.I. Joe: Operation Blackout	Roadblock, Cobra B.A.T.S		
2020	Spider-Man: Miles Morales	Howard		
2021	Marvel's Avengers	Zawavari		
2022	Triangle Strategy	Lionel Khapita		
2022	Rumbleverse	Skip Leggerday		
2022	Bayonetta 3	Rodin		
2022	Cookie Run: Kingdom	Captain Caviar Cookie		
2022	RWBY: Arrowfell	Dr. Pietro Polendina		
2023	Marvel's Spider-Man 2	Howard		
2024	Granblue Fantasy: Relink	Ghandagoza		
2024	The Legend of Heroes: Trails Through Daybreak	Bergard Zeman, citizens		
2024	Ember Sword	Dalcor Kritana		
2024	Batman: Arkham Shadow	Lucius Fox		
2025	Rosewater	Henry Dixon, Kurt Dawson, Jerome Hawkins, Dr. Clark		
2025	Borderlands 4	The Timekeeper		
2026	Yakuza Kiwami 3 & Dark Ties	Yasunaga Miyazato, additional voices		
2026	Marathon	Charter (Arachne Faction Agent)		
2026	Fire Emblem: Fortune's Weave	Bonaventure		
2026	Grand Theft Auto VI	The Local Population		
