= MDA framework =

Model used in game design to analyze games

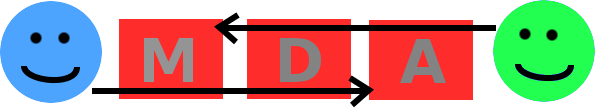
Mechanics, Dynamics and Aesthetics from the perspectives of designer (blue) and player (green)

In game design the Mechanics-Dynamics-Aesthetics (MDA) framework is a tool used to analyze games. It formalizes the properties of games by breaking them down into three components: Mechanics, Dynamics and Aesthetics. These three words have been used informally for many years to describe various aspects of games, but the MDA framework provides precise definitions for these terms and seeks to explain how they relate to each other and influence the player's experience.

== Overview ==
- Mechanics are the base components of the game — its rules, every basic action the player can take in the game, the algorithms and data structures in the game engine etc.
- Dynamics are the run-time behavior of the mechanics acting on player input and "cooperating" with other mechanics.
- Aesthetics are the emotional responses evoked in the player.

There are many types of aesthetics, including but not limited to the following eight stated by Hunicke, LeBlanc and Zubek:

1. Sensation (Game as sense-pleasure): Player enjoys memorable audio-visual effects.
2. Fantasy (Game as make-believe): Imaginary world.
3. Narrative (Game as drama): A story that drives the player to keep coming back
4. Challenge (Game as obstacle course): Urge to master something. Boosts a game's replayability.
5. Fellowship (Game as social framework): A community where the player is an active part of it. Almost exclusive for multiplayer games.
6. Discovery (Game as uncharted territory): Urge to explore game world.
7. Expression (Game as self-discovery): Own creativity. For example, creating a playable character resembling player's own appearance.
8. Submission (Game as pastime): Connection to the game, as a whole, despite constraints.

The paper also mentions a ninth kind of fun: competition. The paper seeks to better specify terms such as 'gameplay' and 'fun', and extend the vocabulary of game studies, suggesting a non-exhaustive taxonomy of eight different types of play. The framework uses these definitions to demonstrate the incentivising and disincentivising properties of different dynamics on the eight subcategories of game use.

From the perspective of the designer, the mechanics generate dynamics which generate aesthetics. This relationship poses a challenge for the game designer as they are only able to influence the mechanics and only through them can be produced meaningful dynamics and aesthetics for the player. The perspective of the player is the other way around. They experience the game through the aesthetics, which the game dynamics provide, which emerged from the mechanics.

== Criticism ==
Despite its popularity, the original MDA framework has been criticized for several potential weaknesses. The eight kinds of fun comprise a rather arbitrary list of emotional targets, which lack fundamentals and how more types of emotional responses can be explored. It also has been challenged for neglecting many design aspects of games while focusing too much on game mechanics, and therefore not suitable for all types of games, including particularly gamified content or any type of experience-oriented design.
