= Alien Logic: A Skyrealms of Jorune Adventure =

1994 video game

- Developer: Ceridus Software
- Publisher: Strategic Simulations
- Designers: Andrew Leker; Jeff Moser; Kevin Stein; Jonathan Stone
- Artists: George Barr; Gene Hirsh; Sharon Stambaugh; Miles Teves
- Composers: Eric Berge; Jonathan Stone
- Series: Skyrealms of Jorune
- Platform: MS-DOS
- Release: 1994
- Genre: Role-playing
- Mode: Single-player

Alien Logic: A Skyrealms of Jorune Adventure is video game based on the Skyrealms of Jorune role-playing game. It was developed by Ceridus Software for MS-DOS and published by Strategic Simulations in 1994.

== Plot ==
Alien Logic is based in the Skyrealms game universe and takes place on the world of Jorune.

== Development ==
Andrew Leker of SkyRealms Publications founded the company Mind Control Software, and its first project was Alien Logic (1994), which SSI published. Leker had created the Skyrealms of Jorune tabletop role-playing game in the 1980s, and long considered using it as the basis for a video game. He pitched this idea to SSI in the early 1990s, and he led the team on the resultant game Alien Logic, which took over three years to develop. Unlike SSI's Advanced Dungeons & Dragons products, such as the Gold Box titles, Alien Logic took major liberties with its pen-and-paper source material. The game was part of SSI's push to diversify after losing the Dungeons & Dragons license from TSR.

Most games imply that having a huge world, or a vast magic system, means more player choice, but does it really? Or does it just mean you've got more different places to have the same repetitive and ultimately boring combat and magical events occur? For me, player choice has to be built in from scratch.

— Bill Dunn, producer

According to producer Bill Dunn, the team's "whole model for the game [was] based on player choice" from the start. While the team had no intention of making Alien Logic completable without fighting, they sought to de-emphasize combat compared to previous SSI products, and instead allow the player to solve problems in multiple ways. To this end, Leker tried to implement three pathways through each situation the player encounters, including "aggressive" and "conversational" options. He also designed the game's events to be nonlinear, so that players could reach the end in different ways. Speaking at the time, Dunn remarked that this focus on player choice "has proven to be pretty difficult to implement, but will certainly be worth it if we succeed."

The game's alien races were written to vary in speech and personality, and to act in ways foreign to human customs. A playtester on the game, Steve Okada, gave the example that the Thriddle's plain delivery "may sound rude ... but that's just the way they are."

Leker was both the design and programming lead for Alien Logic, which he later called "a colossal undertaking for someone so inexperienced". He told IGN in 1999 that he had "many mixed feelings about the results."

== Reception ==
Reception

Review scores
Publication	Score
Computer Gaming World	3/5
PC Gamer (UK)	80%
PC Gamer (US)	83%
Electronic Entertainment	5/5

Award
Publication	Award
Electronic Entertainment	Best Role-Playing Game 1994

Reviewing the game for PC Gamer US, Bernie Yee wrote, "Alien Logic offers a new approach to role-playing, with rich alien cultures, a nice mix of science and sorcery, great SVGA visuals, and an original plot that's refreshingly free of elven types. And most of all, it's fun."

Barry Brenesal of Electronic Entertainment called it "an unusually clever, finely textured game", whose only drawback was its lack of 3D graphics. He ended, "Buy a one-way ticket to Jorune: you'll never want to leave." The magazine later named Alien Logic its 1994 "Best Role-Playing Game", with the editors praising it as "a breath of fresh air" in its genre.

Paul C. Schuytema of Computer Gaming World stated: "The craft displayed in the implementation of the game's interfaces and the world dynamics only makes me more frustrated. SSI has crafted one hell of a game engine, which would have been eminently capable of presenting us with an unforgettable playing experience. Instead, they deliver plot and writing which are nothing more than an embarrassment, leaving the player only going through the 'point and click' motions rather than becoming absorbed in an alien world and culture so painstakingly thought out." Scorpia agreed, calling Alien Logic "rather superficial and lightweight", with "teeth-grinding" dialogue. However, she saw promise in the gameplay systems and Jorune setting, and hoped that future games would bring "depth, characterization, and decent plotting".

James V. Trunzo reviewed Alien Logic: A Skyrealms of Jorune Adventure in White Wolf Inphobia #56 (June, 1995), rating it a 4 out of 5 and stated that "To those who are tired of run-of-the-mill fantasy monster bashing, Alien Logic: A Skyrealms of Jorune might be what Dr. Pepper is to Coke - a refreshingly different taste."

PC Gamer UK's Andy Butcher praised the game as "fresh, new and exciting."

According to Shannon Appelcline, Alien Logic "was considered original and innovative but too tough to learn and thus it never really got much attention". In his book Dungeons and Desktops: The History of Computer Role-Playing Games (2008), the video game historian Matt Barton noted that Alien Logic "faded into near-total obscurity" after its release. However, he considered it "an unfairly obscure game that deserves more attention."

Because Alien Logic did not sell well, multiple investors were given part of the rights to Skyrealms of Jorune as a form of payback.
