= Skyrealms of Jorune =

Science fantasy role-playing game

Jorune
- Cover of the first edition
- Publishers: SkyRealms Publishing, later Chessex
- Publication: 1984 (1st edition) 1985 (2nd edition) 1992 (3rd edition)
- Genres: Science fiction, Science fantasy

Skyrealms of Jorune is a science-fantasy role-playing game that was first published in 1984 through SkyRealms Publishing. The game is set on the fictional alien planet of Jorune above which float levitating islands. The second edition was published in 1986 as a boxed set, and a third edition was published by Chessex in 1992. The computer game Alien Logic: A Skyrealms of Jorune Adventure was published in 1994. The various editions received positive reviews in game periodicals including Casus Belli, White Dwarf, White Wolf, Different Worlds, Dragon, Polyhedron, The Games Machine, and Challenge.

== Setting ==
Jorune is the fictional planet used as a setting for the Skyrealms of Jorune role-playing game. The Skyrealms are the game's main setting - floating "islands" levitated by mysterious crystals in the crust of an alien planet. Following the evolution of the native life forms ("Jorune creatures") and the sentient indigenous Shanthas, Jorune was colonized by successive waves of space-faring immigrants, including the insectoid Cleash, the bizarre Thriddle, and the broadly humanoid Ramian; the final colonization was by humans. Following an unexpected and permanent severing of communication with Earth, misunderstandings between the "stranded" human colonists and the Shanthas resulted in a devastating war that eventually reduced all societies on the planet to an Iron-Age level.

By the time gameplay begins, more than 3000 years after the Human-Shanthic War, the human race has evolved into three subspecies differentiated by size and facility with Isho (the magic-like energy of the setting): regular humans; the small, Isho-adept Muadra; and the large, Isho-resistant Boccord. (Players can also choose to be one of four additional races: the Blount, Crugar, Bronth, and Woffen, all bipedal, genetically engineered descendants of Earth animals — toads, cougars, bears, and wolves, respectively.)

The role-playing game is based on a science-fantasy background (of the planetary romance subtype) created by Andrew Leker, and is quite different from other role-playing games of the time. However, as reviewer Edwin King noted, it has some features in common with Tekumel, the setting of Empire of the Petal Throne, notably the idea of humans colonizing a distant planet and subsequently losing contact with the rest of humanity (a dimensional rift in Tekumel's case, civil war in Jorune's) leading to the regression of the colonists' society and war against the planet's native inhabitants. The barbaric fantasy world populated by sword-wielding heroes who encounter strange alien beings and technologies is also somewhat comparable to the Barsoom of the John Carter novels of Edgar Rice Burroughs, and has elements of the intricate fantasy worlds of Jack Vance.

Conflict and interaction between the various alien species on Jorune drives some of the drama of individual adventures, as does the exploration of the planet's surface, which is littered with powerful prehistoric artifacts originating variously with the initial human settlement (typically blaster weapons and other "advanced technology") or Shanthas instruments designed to manipulate Isho.

Some game terms were derived from the language of Jorune, such as the use of "Sholari" ("teacher") for the gamemaster or "Isho" for the system of magic.

At the start of the campaign, all player characters begin with the life goal of becoming Drenn (citizens). Needing the support and sponsorship of other Drenn to realize this goal, the player characters must accomplish tasks that will prove them worthy of becoming Drenn.

== Publication history ==
=== First edition ===
In 1984, writer Andrew Leker and artist Miles Teves founded SkyRealms Publishing in order to turn a high school English assignment into the first edition of Skyrealms of Jorune. The result, written by Teves and Leker, and edited by Leker's sister Amy Leker, was released as a 176-page perfect bound book. featuring artwork by Teves.

Later the same year, Skyrealms produced the 46-page adventure Maustin Caji.

=== Second edition ===
The following year, SkyRealms published a second edition boxed set that included:

- 64-page Player Manual: information for the players about character generation and playing the game
- 72-page Sholari Book: information only for the gamemaster
- 32-page Tauther Guide: information about Jorune for both the players and the gamemaster
- 16-page The Skyrealm Kolovisondra: a beginning campaign setting for the gamemaster
- 2 loose-leaf combat summary sheets
- 1 loose-leaf resource reference sheet
- 5 bifold blank character sheets

From 1985 to 1988, SkyRealms published a number of supplements:

- Companion Jorune: Burdoth, 1986
- Companion Jorune: Ardoth, 1987
- Earth-Tec Jorune, Sourcebook, 1988

Pre-release versions of two additional sourcebooks, Playing the Iscin Races and Shanthas of Jorune were made available at conventions in 1989 and 1990, respectively, but were never published by SkyRealms.

=== Third Edition ===
In 1992, Chessex published a third edition, Skyrealms of Jorune: The RolePlaying Game ISBN 1-883240-00-X. Over the next two years, Chessex released a number of resources:

- The Innocents of Gauss, Beginning adventure, 1993, ISBN 1-883240-01-8
- The Sobayid Atlas, Sourcebook, 1994, ISBN 1-883240-03-4
- The Sholari Pack, Sourcebook, Adventure, Screen, 1994, ISBN 1-883240-02-6
- The Gire of Sillipus, Sourcebook, 1994, ISBN 1-883240-04-2

== Spinoffs ==
A number of third-party products based on the world of Jorune have been published:

- Alien Logic: A Skyrealms of Jorune Adventure (1994), a DOS-based RPG.
- Sarceen's Knowledge, fanzine from UK by Alex Blair.
- Sholari, fanzine from US by Joseph K. Adams aka Joe Coleman.
- Bokelby's Folly, fanzine from UK by Ray Gilliam.
- Danstead's Traveler, webzine by Danstead Traveler (defunct).
- Journal of the Tansoor Historical Society, fanzine from US by Joseph K. Adams.
- Gomo Guide to Thoneport, fanzine from US by Joseph K. Adams.

== Reception ==
Stephan Wieck reviewed the game in the October 1986 issue of White Wolf. He praised the quality of the game system and components as well as its artwork. Wieck stated that, "Overall, Jorune is an excellent game. I have played almost every major game on the market, and Jorune is the classiest of them all. It is rich with life and action; it's a classic. The price is high, but the game's worth it." He rated the game overall at 9 stars out of 10.

Robert Neville reviewed the second edition of Skyrealms of Jorune for White Dwarf #82, and stated that "All in all, Skyrealms of Jorune is a worthwhile addition to the gaming field. Apart from a distinct need for its GM to have played other rpgs beforehand, and a lack of introductory adventure, it has few faults, and these are outweighed, to my mind, by the depth of detail on the truly fascinating background."

In Issue 39 of Abyss, Dave Nalle commented, "The real prize in Jorune is the world background, which is exceptionally well detailed and very original, with its blend of SF and fantasy and the human and inhuman." Nalle also thought the art was "a real plus, and you really get a great feel for the flora and fauna of the world from [the] unusual alien style." Nalle concluded, "If you want to see a great and convincing campaign world, go and get Jorune, even if you don't plan to play it. It is a valuable resource and I think it is a potentially inspirational example of world design."

In the March–April 1987 edition of Different Worlds (Issue #45), Edwin King admired the setting of Jorune, calling it "an alien world that is both believable and entertaining without being so much of a personal creation that no one but its designer can play it." However, King criticized the combat system, pointing out the unfairness of some rules, and several internal contradictions. He also pointed out the many typographical errors, saying, "Jorune cries out for better proofreading." On the other hand, King liked the visual aspect of the game, commenting, "the art in Jorune is excellent and goes a long way towards creating the appropriate atmosphere. The illustrations of monsters and intelligent species are particularly well done, and the captions are often intriguing." He concluded by giving the game a rating of 3 out of 4, saying, "I think that more care could have been taken with elements of the rules, but the joy of Jorune is in the conception of its environment, rather than the elegance of its system. I highly recommend Jorune to anyone who wants to step into a really different fantasy world."

In the December 1987 edition of Dragon (Issue 128), Ken Rolston admired the second edition of this game, saying, "Boy is this good, and it's different from most other [fantasy role-playing games]." However, Rolston found the rules imprecise and badly organized, and the combat mechanics "involved and clunky." He also noted the lack of pre-generated characters, and found tips for gamemasters to be inadequate. Rolston did like the magic systems and campaign background, and called the illustrations "superb". He concluded with a strong recommendation, saying "Skyrealms of Jorune is a wonderfully original and inspiring FRPG campaign setting. On that basis alone, it is certainly a worthwhile purchase."

In Issue 20 of The Games Machine, Paul Reid called the game "a wonderfully complex world where the fantastic, the futuristic and the simply bizarre mingle to create a richness of opportunities for adventure." He especially liked the illustrations, calling them "the most striking feature [...] they add to a high overall standard of presentation." Although Reid didn't like the lack of an index, he concluded, "SkyRealms Of Jorune offers a wealth of material for your money, and presents a setting which is both unusual and convincing in its imaginative richness. A really striking game that every roleplayer should try."

In his 1990 book The Complete Guide to Role-Playing Games, game critic Rick Swan called this a "bad news, good news" game: The bad news was that the game mechanics were "adequate at best ... and ambiguous at worst", and the game was "playable, but not without effort, and I suspect the fuzzy rules will discourage most beginners." The good news was its "remarkable fantasy setting, second only to Empire of the Petal Throne in originality, details and texture." Swan concluded by giving the game a solid rating of 3 out of 4, saying, "the setting is startlingly different from those typical of fantasy RPGs, making it well worth the purchase for anyone who's bored with endless variations of medieval Europe."

Stephan Wieck reviewed the Third Edition of Skyrealms of Jorune in White Wolf #33 (September/October 1992), rating it a 4 out of 10 and stated that "For those diehard fans still playing the second edition, the third edition doesn't really offer much that's new beyond more description of the cultures of Jorune's intelligent races and some new Earth-tec."

In a 1996 readers' poll conducted by the UK games magazine Arcane to determine the 50 most popular roleplaying games of all time, Skyrealms of Jorune was ranked 30th. Editor Paul Pettengale commented: "Bonkers. Okay, so it is a good game in terms of atmosphere, system structure, presentation and the depth of the background, but it's bonkers."

In his 2023 book Monsters, Aliens, and Holes in the Ground, RPG historian Stu Horvath called this game "one of the most relentlessly strange and difficult to pronounce RPGs ever made." To its detriment, Horvath pointed out "The system is clunky and skill-based, full of inconsistencies, and peppered with reference charts that border on terrifying." But Horvath set that aside, commenting, "What Skyrealms succeeds at, better than any other RPG setting, is an aggressive pursuit of alienness ... The layering of details creates a kind of self-reinforcing veracity out of the collage of fictional facts." Horvath concluded, "This approach to world design is most rewarding when building worlds that are far outside the bounds of what genre conventions teach players to expect ... Details have the power to transform worlds that should be baffling into worlds that are endlessly intriguing."

== Other reviews ==
- Casus Belli #33 (June 1986)
- Polyhedron #42 (July 1988; "The Critical Hit: Exploring Jorune")
- Casus Belli #72 (Nov 1992)
- Australian Realms #9 (Jan/Feb 1993)
- Challenge #74 (1994)
- Isaac Asimov's Science Fiction Magazine v11 n4 (1987 04)
- Abyss Quarterly #50 (Winter, 1992)
- Comics Feature #51
