= Joe Coleman (game designer) =

American writer and game designer (died 2021)

- Died: June 22, 2021
- Occupation: Game designer

Joseph Steven Coleman (died June 22, 2021), also known as Joseph K. Adams, was a game designer who has worked primarily on role-playing games.

== Career ==
Using the name Joseph K. Adams, he was a playwright and minor radio personality in Los Angeles.

Joe Coleman was given the freedom to work on SkyRealms Publishing products whenever time allowed, once Janie Sellers became the line editor for the second edition of the SkyRealms of Jorune from Chessex. Coleman authored supplements late in the SkyRealms publication history, including The Gire of Sillipus (1994) and The Sobayid Atlas (1994). Coleman produced the fanzine Sholari (1993-1995), one of the Jorune fanzines that supported the setting after the principals at SkyRealms pulled the Jorune license from Chessex.

In 2003, Joe retired to North Carolina and took back his birth name of Joseph Kessler Adams. He continued to publish content until his death in 2021.
