= Mark Darin =

American video game designer

- Occupation(s): Game designer, graphic designer, writer

Mark Darin is an American video game designer and writer. He was the co-designer of CSI: Hard Evidence, Sam & Max Beyond Time and Space, Strong Bad's Cool Game for Attractive People, Tales of Monkey Island, and Nelson Tethers: Puzzle Agent. He wrote the second episode of The Walking Dead, Starved for Help.

== Career ==
Mark Darin began his career creating the Nick Bounty series of freeware adventure games. He joined Telltale Games as a lead designer and writer.

Tales of Monkey Island, for which Mark Darin was the co-designer, was nominated for "best artistic design" and won for the award for "biggest surprise" at IGN's Best of E3 2009 Awards. After release, it won the PC Gamer 2009 adventure game of the year, was nominated for the IGN best adventure game of the year for PC and Wii, won the Adventure Gamers Best Adventure of 2009, and was named the "Best Series Revival" by OC Weekly.

The second episode of The Walking Dead, which Mark Darin wrote, won the GameSpy E3 2012 award for "Best Adventure Game".

== Games ==
- 2008 - CSI: Hard Evidence, co-designer (Telltale Games)
- 2008 - Sam & Max Beyond Time and Space, co-designer (Telltale Games)
- 2008 - Strong Bad's Cool Game for Attractive People, co-designer (Telltale Games)
- 2009 - Tales of Monkey Island, co-designer (Telltale Games)
- 2010 - Nelson Tethers: Puzzle Agent, co-designer (Telltale Games)
- 2011 - Hector: Badge of Carnage, design, script editing (Telltale Games)
- 2011 - Jurassic Park: The Game, co-designer (The Calvary) (Telltale Games)
- 2012 - Law & Order: Legacies, additional design (Telltale Games)
- 2012 - The Walking Dead, writer (Starved for Help) (Telltale Games)
- 2013 - The Walking Dead: 400 Days, co-designer, co-writer (Telltale Games)
- 2014 - The Walking Dead: Season Two, lead designer (Telltale Games)
- 2014 - Tales From the Borderlands, season lead (Telltale Games)
- 2015 - Minecraft: Story Mode, co-designer (Telltale Games)
- 2016 - Batman: The Telltale Series, co-designer (Telltale Games)
- 2017 - Guardians of the Galaxy: The Telltale Series, co-designer (Telltale Games)
- 2018 - The Walking Dead: The Final Season, co-designer (Telltale Games)
- 2018 - The Adventures of Nick and Willikins, animator, design consultant (Pinhead Games)
- 2020 - Nick Bounty and the Dame with the Blue Chewed Shoe, writer, director, designer (Pinhead Games)
