= Oasis (video game) =

2005 video game

- Developer: Mind Control Software
- Publishers: PlayFirst; Activision
- Engine: Orbital Engine
- Platforms: Windows, Mobile phone, iPad
- Release: 12 April 2005
- Genre: Turn-based strategy
- Mode: Single-player

Oasis is a turn-based strategy video game developed by American studio Mind Control Software and published for Microsoft Windows by PlayFirst in April 2005. Konami released a mobile phone port in 2006. Mind Control reacquired rights to the game from PlayFirst in 2010 and released an iPad version called Defense of the Oasis that same year. An iPad version was published on Steam in August 2020. Oasis is a casual game set in ancient Egypt that combines Civilization-style strategy and puzzle gameplay. Oasis has been described as "Civilization meets Minesweeper".

== Gameplay ==
Each level of Oasis consists of a single screen with a 10x10 grid of randomly generated terrain. Initially the map is covered with fog of war, but the player may remove the fog from tiles by clicking on them. Each click reveals a single tile and takes a turn; 85 turns are available for each level. The eponymous oasis covers several squares of each level and lying in a random oasis tile is the obelisk which contains the level's glyph of power. The primary goal is to find the glyph and protect it from barbarians who attack after the 85th turn from tiles marked by blue cairns. To stop the barbarians from destroying the glyph the player must find cities and use them to mount a defense. The player wins the game by finding and defending 12 glyphs.

Layered on top of the basic gameplay are eight scenarios. Each scenario presents a narrative about a different land and the story of a different leader rising to power. In the first scenario players assume the role of an Egyptian noble, the son of the murdered Falcon King, who wishes to rebuild the nation and disperse the fog that has plunged the nation into chaos since his father's murder. Each scenario has its own theme, and each level within a scenario is distinguished by a mix of special gameplay elements related to the theme, such as barbarian strongholds, jungles, islands, plagues, and others.

Most tiles give the player a number of followers when revealed. Followers are a resource; the player may spend them to build roads or send them to work in the mines. Both activities also cost a turn. Cities connected by roads gradually grow whereas followers working in mines research combat technology. Both benefits accrue over time, which encourages early investments in mines and roads. Turns can also be spent searching cities which reveals either treasures or advisors. Most treasures provide an attack bonus to the population in that city. When found, advisors pledge to join the player if enough cities survive the barbarian attack. Advisors grant bonuses to the player and substantially alter playing strategy.

With 100 tiles and just 85 turns, the player cannot hope to uncover every tile, but the map is not entirely random. Certain features are present on every or nearly every map: the oasis, cairns, cities, the nomad camp, and mountains. There are clues to finding each feature: the oasis and cairns always appear on the edge, cities are surrounded on all eight sides by crop tiles, the nomad camp appears in the largest block of desert, mountains can be seen from one square away, and mountain ranges are either U-shaped, S-shaped, or stretch vertically across the map. As an additional clue to finding cities, the number of cities touching a crop tile is the number of followers gained when the tile is uncovered. This sometimes results in being able to find cities in fewer clicks by solving a small Minesweeper-like puzzle.

The central tension of the game comes from making trade offs. Players always have more avenues to improve their positions than they have time and resources to pursue them, especially when it comes to spending limited turns and followers. For example, spending turns on exploration provides followers and strategic information, but it delays roads and technology which benefit from early investments. Connecting a far away city could result in net population growth, but it may take valuable time away from searching for a crucial treasure or cairn. Searching the oasis costs turns and gives no immediate value, but it boosts the player's score and leads to bonus levels, which often result in a free glyph and advisor.

== Development ==
Oasis took eight full-time developers two years and five months to make. The game design was based around a "No bad click" philosophy. As one of the game's designers puts it: "A level consists of 85 carrots and one big stick. The player takes 85 turns discovering and rebuilding his or her empire, where every turn creates some kind of goodness".

== Reception ==
Reviews
Publication	Response
Computer Games Magazine	4/5
GameSpot	8.5/10
Game Tunnel	10/10
IGN	7.2/10
PC Zone	51/100

Oasis received largely positive reviews from the videogame press, received awards from the independent game community and has been ported to mobile phone by Konami. In July 2010, Electrified Games released an iPad version of Oasis renamed as Defense of the Oasis to avoid confusion with the English rock band Oasis.

Reviewers agreed that the game is easy to pick up and play whilst containing depth of gameplay. Female gamer website Grrl Gamer described the game as "one part puzzle and one part strategy", while Game Tunnel stated that "Oasis packs a very powerful punch of both strategy and entertainment". Game Daily's reviewer disagreed, describing Oasis as "the perfect game for those times when you need to do something mindless and silly" and that there is no need to plan moves before taking them.

Website Game Tunnel's founder Russell Carroll rated the game 10 out of 10 overall, saying that "the game is flawlessly designed to create a wonderful experience in strategy/world-building that even those who don't really get into the genre can enjoy" and "Oasis is one of the best gaming experiences I've had this year". In Computer Games Magazine, Steve Bauman called the game "simple, but hardly simplistic". Although he noted its "over-reliance on luck", he nonetheless found that it "offers up surprisingly deep and interesting strategy", and argued that "there's some serious fun to be had with Oasis".

Oasis received Game Tunnel's 2005 "Game of the Year" and "Strategy Game of the Year" awards. The game also won the Independent Games Festival's 2004 "Seumas McNally Grand Prize" and "Innovation in Game Design" awards in the web/downloadable category. During the 9th Annual Interactive Achievement Awards, Oasis was nominated for "Downloadable Game of the Year" by the Academy of Interactive Arts & Sciences.
