= The Walking Dead (video game) =

2012 episodic graphic adventure video game

- Cover art featuring Lee Everett and Clementine
- Developer: Telltale Games
- Publisher: Telltale Games
- Directors: Directors: Sean Vanaman; Jake Rodkin; Dennis Lenart; Eric Parsons; Nick Herman; Sean Ainsworth
- Designers: Designers: Sean Vanaman; Jake Rodkin; Mark Darin; Harrison G. Pink; Andrew Langley; Sean Ainsworth
- Programmers: Carl Muckenhoupt; Randy Tudor; Keenan Patterson
- Artist: Derek Sakai
- Writers: Writers: Sean Vanaman; Mark Darin; Gary Whitta
- Composer: Jared Emerson-Johnson
- Series: The Walking Dead
- Engine: Telltale Tool
- Platforms: Platforms: Android; iOS; Kindle Fire HDX; OS X; Windows; Nintendo Switch; Ouya; PlayStation 3; PlayStation 4; PlayStation Vita; Xbox 360; Xbox One
- Release: Episode 1: Windows, Mac OS X; WW: April 24, 2012 PlayStation 3; NA: April 24, 2012; EU: April 25, 2012 Xbox 360; WW: April 27, 2012 iOS; WW: July 26, 2012 Kindle Fire HDX; WW: December 19, 2013; Episode 2: Xbox 360; WW: June 27, 2012 Windows, Mac OS X; WW: June 29, 2012 PlayStation 3; NA: June 29, 2012; EU: July 6, 2012 iOS; WW: August 29, 2012 Kindle Fire HDX; WW: December 19, 2013; Episode 3: PlayStation 3; WW: August 28, 2012 Windows, Mac OS X, Xbox 360; WW: August 29, 2012 iOS; WW: October 28, 2012 Kindle Fire HDX; WW: December 19, 2013; Episode 4: PlayStation 3; WW: October 9, 2012 Windows, Mac OS X, Xbox 360; WW: October 10, 2012 iOS; WW: November 8, 2012 Kindle Fire HDX; WW: December 19, 2013; Episode 5: PlayStation 3; WW: November 20, 2012 Windows, Mac OS X, Xbox 360; WW: November 21, 2012 iOS; WW: November 20, 2012 Kindle Fire HDX; WW: December 19, 2013; Episode 6 (400 Days DLC): WW: July 2, 2013; Retail version: Mac OS X, Windows, PlayStation 3 & Xbox 360; NA: December 11, 2012; AU: May 9, 2013; EU: May 10, 2013 PlayStation Vita; WW: August 22, 2013 PlayStation 4, Xbox One; NA: October 14, 2014; EU: October 31, 2014 Switch; WW: August 28, 2018
- Genres: Graphic adventure; Interactive movie
- Mode: Single-player

The Walking Dead (Note: Also known as The Walking Dead: The Game or Telltale's The Walking Dead, or alternatively subtitled with The Telltale Series or A Telltale Games Series, and later known as The Walking Dead: Season One) is a 2012 episodic graphic adventure video game developed and published by Telltale Games. Set in the same universe as the comic book series of the same name by Robert Kirkman, it is the first installment, or "season", in Telltale's The Walking Dead video game series, and comprises five main "episodes" and one DLC episode released between April 2012 and July 2013. The game follows Lee Everett, a convicted criminal who becomes the guardian of a young girl named Clementine amidst the onset of a zombie apocalypse in Georgia. Player decisions, such as dialogue choices and actions, influence the story's direction, with the consequences of these choices carrying over across the game's episodes.

Telltale developed The Walking Dead after securing a deal with Robert Kirkman and Warner Bros. in 2011. Influenced by narrative-driven games like Heavy Rain and Mass Effect, it focused on player choice and character-driven storytelling rather than action. Kirkman provided oversight while allowing Telltale creative freedom, ensuring the game aligned with the comics. The choice system influenced character interactions and minor events but did not significantly alter the overall story. Developed for multiple platforms, the game faced technical challenges with save data and release scheduling.

Released in five episodes between April and November 2012 on various platforms, The Walking Dead received widespread praise for its emotional depth, narrative, and the dynamic between Lee and Clementine. It helped revitalize its impact on the adventure game genre. It won year-end accolades, including Game of the Year awards from several gaming publications. By the end of 2012, it had sold over 8.5 million episodes, with total sales reaching 28 million episodes by July 2014.

In 2013, Telltale expanded the game into a franchise by releasing an additional downloadable episode, 400 Days, to extend the first season and bridge the gap towards Season 2, which was released in 2013–2014. Season 3 and the final season were released in 2016–2017 and 2018–2019, respectively, along with a spin-off game based on the character Michonne.

== Gameplay ==
The Walking Dead is a point-and-click graphic adventure video game played from a third-person perspective. In the game, the player character, Lee Everett, tries to survive and protect a young girl named Clementine during the midst of a zombie apocalypse, working with a small group of survivors. Using an on-screen reticle, the player can examine and interact with characters and items, and must make use of collected items and the environment. Throughout the game, the player is presented with the ability to interact with their surroundings and options to determine the nature of that interaction. The player must solve environmental puzzles or talk to different characters to progress the story. According to Robert Kirkman, The Walking Dead is focused more on developing characters and story, and less on the action tropes that tend to feature in other zombie-based games, such as Left 4 Dead.

A screenshot showing dialog choices. At certain points in the game's conversation trees, the player will have a limited amount of time to respond, shown at the bottom of this screen. If they do not respond in time, the game will default to the "no statement" (ellipses) option.

Some parts of the game require timed responses from the player, often leading to significant decisions that will impact the game's story, in the manner of role-playing games (RPGs). Some conversation trees require the player to make a selection within a limited time, otherwise Lee will remain quiet, which can affect how other characters respond to him. Unlike in other RPGs such as the Mass Effect or Fallout series, where choices fall on either side of a "good or evil" scale, the choices within The Walking Dead have ambiguous results, having an effect on the attitude of the non-player characters towards Lee.

The player can choose to play in "Minimal" mode, disabling hints and the "choice notification" feature that signals changes in the game or characters' attitudes toward Lee. In more action-based sequences, the player must follow on-screen prompts for quick time events (QTEs) so as to keep themselves or other characters alive; if they die, the game restarts from just prior to the QTE. Each episode of the game includes several points where the player must choose between two options. The player can create multiple saves and use a "rewind" feature to revisit and change previous decisions, allowing them to explore different outcomes.

== Plot ==
This is a broad overview of the plot. Certain decisions made by the player will alter details of specific events.

Several members of the main cast of survivors of The Walking Dead by Episode 4. From left, Christa, Omid, Kenny, Lee, Ben, and Chuck.

The Walking Dead occurs simultaneously with the events from the original comic series, where a zombie apocalypse overwhelms much of society. On day one of the outbreak, convicted criminal Lee Everett (voiced by Dave Fennoy) is being transported to prison when the police car crashes after hitting a walker. After killing the reanimated cop, Lee flees from a group of walkers and takes shelter in a suburban home, where he meets Clementine (Melissa Hutchison), a young girl whose parents had traveled to Savannah. They are rescued by Shawn Greene (Peter Edward Mussad), who takes them to his father Hershel's (Chuck Kourouklis) farm, where they meet Kenny (Gavin Hammon), his wife Katjaa (Cissy Jones), and their son Duck (Max Kaufman). After Shawn is killed by walkers, Hershel forces the group to leave. They travel to Macon, Lee's hometown, and join another group led by Lilly (Nicki Rapp), barricaded in Lee's family pharmacy. The group includes Glenn (Nick Herman), who eventually leaves to find friends in Atlanta.

Three months later, the group has holed up in a nearby motel and is low on supplies. They encounter a group of survivors, including Ben Paul (Trevor Hoffmann), whose teacher's death shows the group that everyone is already infected, turning into walkers upon death, regardless of being bitten. They make a deal with the St. Johns, a family running a nearby dairy farm, to exchange gasoline for food. However, they discover the St. Johns partake in cannibalism. The group loses two of their own, including Lilly's father Larry (Terry McGovern), but eventually escapes the farm, leaving it overrun by walkers. On their way back to the motel, they find an abandoned car full of supplies and take what they need. Later, bandits attack the motel, drawing a horde of walkers. The group escapes, but Duck is bitten. Lilly, hostile after Larry's death, murders one of the group members and leaves the group. The remaining survivors head to Savannah by train, planning to find a boat to escape the mainland. Along the way, they meet Chuck (Roger Jackson), a homeless survivor who advises Lee to teach Clementine how to defend herself. En route to Savannah, Duck succumbs to his bite, and in turn, Katjaa commits suicide. Near Savannah, the group meets Omid (Owen Thomas) and Christa (Mara Junot), a couple who joins them. A walkie-talkie that Clementine carries suddenly activates, with a man claiming he has her parents in Savannah.

In Savannah, the group sets up shelter in an abandoned mansion but loses Chuck to walkers. Lee and Kenny discover that all the boats in the area are either gone or destroyed, and that the walled community of Crawford has scavenged most of the supplies. Separated from the group, Lee encounters another group led by Vernon (Butch Engle), who helps him return to the mansion, where they discover a motorboat in a shed. The group raids Crawford for supplies, only to find the community overrun by walkers. They manage to escape, but not without losses. Vernon leaves, doubting Lee's ability to protect Clementine. Clementine, desperate to find her parents, goes missing. In his haste to find her, Lee is bitten by a walker. Realizing he doesn't have much time left, Lee tries to find Vernon's group but discovers they have stolen the boat. Clementine contacts Lee via walkie-talkie, telling him that she is being held at a downtown hotel, the same one where her parents had stayed. Lee's group heads to the hotel, navigating rooftops to avoid walkers in the streets. Kenny is seemingly lost after sacrificing himself to save another member. Separated from Omid and Christa, Lee reaches the hotel alone and confronts Clementine's captor, The Stranger (Anthony Lam), who reveals he is the owner of the car they had previously ransacked. After killing him, Lee and Clementine cover themselves in walker guts to avoid detection and head through the streets.

They encounter Clementine's zombified parents, and a weakening Lee helps her reach an abandoned store. Inside, Lee urges Clementine to escape the city and find Omid and Christa. He instructs her to either shoot him or leave him to become a walker. In a post-credits scene, Clementine, having escaped the city, spots two figures in the distance who notice her.

=== 400 Days ===
The downloadable content 400 Days relates stories of other survivors in the zombie apocalypse, starting at its onset and occurring concurrently with the first season.

There are five stories:

- Vince (Anthony Lam) is a convicted murderer who was imprisoned for killing a man to protect his brother. On Day 2 of the outbreak, he is on a prison transport bus with fellow inmates Danny (Erik Braa) and Justin (Trevor Hoffmann) when a violent standoff leads to the bus being overrun by walkers. Vince must free one of the other prisoners to escape while leaving the other to die.
- Wyatt (Jace Smykel) and his friend Eddie (Brandon Bales) are on the run after accidentally killing a friend of Nate (Jefferson Arca). On Day 41, while fleeing in a car, they hit one of the prison guards from Vince's bus in heavy fog. When one of them steps out to check on the injured man, the other is forced to drive away when Nate suddenly attacks.
- Russell (Vegas Trip) is a teenager traveling on foot to find his grandmother. On Day 184, he hitches a ride with Nate, who takes him to a gas station and truck stop. There, they are fired upon by an elderly man named Walt. Nate sees an opportunity to kill and rob Walt and his wife, Jean. Russell must decide whether to go along with Nate's plan or leave him behind.
- Bonnie (Erin Yvette), a recovering drug addict, is traveling with Leland (Adam Harrington) and his wife Dee (Cissy Jones). Dee is suspicious of Bonnie, believing Leland has feelings for her. On Day 220, after Dee steals supplies from another group, they are chased into a cornfield, where Bonnie accidentally kills Dee with a rebar. She must then decide to either tell Leland the truth or lie about what happened.
- Shel (Cissy Jones) and her younger sister Becca (Brett Pels) are part of a group living at the same truck stop from Russell's story. Some members were once with Vernon, whom Lee encountered in Savannah. Their leader, Roman (Kid Beyond), enforces strict control over the group. On Day 236, Shel is the deciding vote in the fate of a captured scavenger named Roberto, who attempted to steal from them. Later, on Day 259, fellow group member Stephanie (Dana Bauer) is caught stealing, and Roman demands that Shel execute her. Shel must choose whether to comply or escape with Becca in their caravan.

On Day 400, Tavia (Rashida Clendening) finds a billboard near the now-overrun truck stop, displaying photos of the survivors and a map leading to a supposed safe haven. She tracks them down and offers them sanctuary. Bonnie accepts, while the others' decisions depend on their past choices and whether Tavia can successfully convince them to join her.

== Episodes ==
The game was separated into five episodes, released between April and November 2012. Each episode lasts about two and a half hours.

No. overall	No. in season	Title	Directed by	Written by	Original release date
Main series
1	1	"A New Day"	Sean Vanaman; Jake Rodkin	Sean Vanaman	April 24, 2012
At the onset of the zombie apocalypse, Lee Everett rescues young Clementine, and they join other survivors in Macon, Georgia to survive the undead onslaught.
2	2	"Starved for Help"	Dennis Lenart	Mark Darin; Story by: Chuck Jordan	June 27, 2012
After having secured a motel, Lee and the other survivors are running low on food, and decide to take an offer made by the St. Johns, a family that owns a nearby dairy farm. They come to learn the St. Johns may not be what they seem.
3	3	"Long Road Ahead"	Eric Parsons	Sean Vanaman; Story by: Sean Vanaman; Jake Rodkin; Harrison G. Pink	August 28, 2012
When bandits and walkers attack the motel, the group is forced to flee without their supplies, leading to tensions on the road. They find a working train, headed for Savannah, where Clementine hopes to find her parents.
4	4	"Around Every Corner"	Nick Herman	Gary Whitta	October 9, 2012
The survivors arrive in Savannah to search for a boat, only to get caught in a conflict involving a corrupt community and an elusive enemy who is following them.
5	5	"No Time Left"	Sean Vanaman; Jake Rodkin; Sean Ainsworth	Sean Vanaman	November 20, 2012
A bitten Lee and the remaining survivors travel across the now zombie-infested Savannah in an effort to find and rescue Clementine.
Downloadable content
6	6	"400 Days"	Sean Ainsworth	Sean Ainsworth; Nick Breckon; Mark Darin; Sean Vanaman; Gary Whitta	July 2, 2013
The story focuses on five new characters during the first 400 days of the zombie outbreak: Vince, a convicted criminal; Wyatt, who is fleeing from an unknown pursuer; Russell, who is trying to find his grandmother; Bonnie, a recovering drug addict; and Shel, who is trying to survive with her sister Becca. The epilogue follows Tavia, a recruiter of other survivors for her community.

=== Supplemental episodes ===
An additional episode, titled 400 Days, was released in July 2013 as downloadable content, bridging the gap between the first and second season. It is presented in a nonlinear narrative style; the player can approach the five stories in any order they choose.

== Development ==
=== Background ===
Before The Walking Dead, Telltale Games had success with episodic adventures based on established properties, such as Sam & Max and Tales of Monkey Island. Sean Vanaman noted that before securing The Walking Dead, Telltale's Carl Muckenhoupt was working on a text-based prototype with an "active world," where objects and characters acted independently of player input. Although Telltale considered using this concept for a Left 4 Dead spinoff, discussions with Valve did not materialize. Telltale announced deals with Robert Kirkman and Warner Bros. in February 2011 for episodic series based on The Walking Dead and Fables, with The Walking Dead series set to start in the fourth quarter of 2011.

=== Writing ===
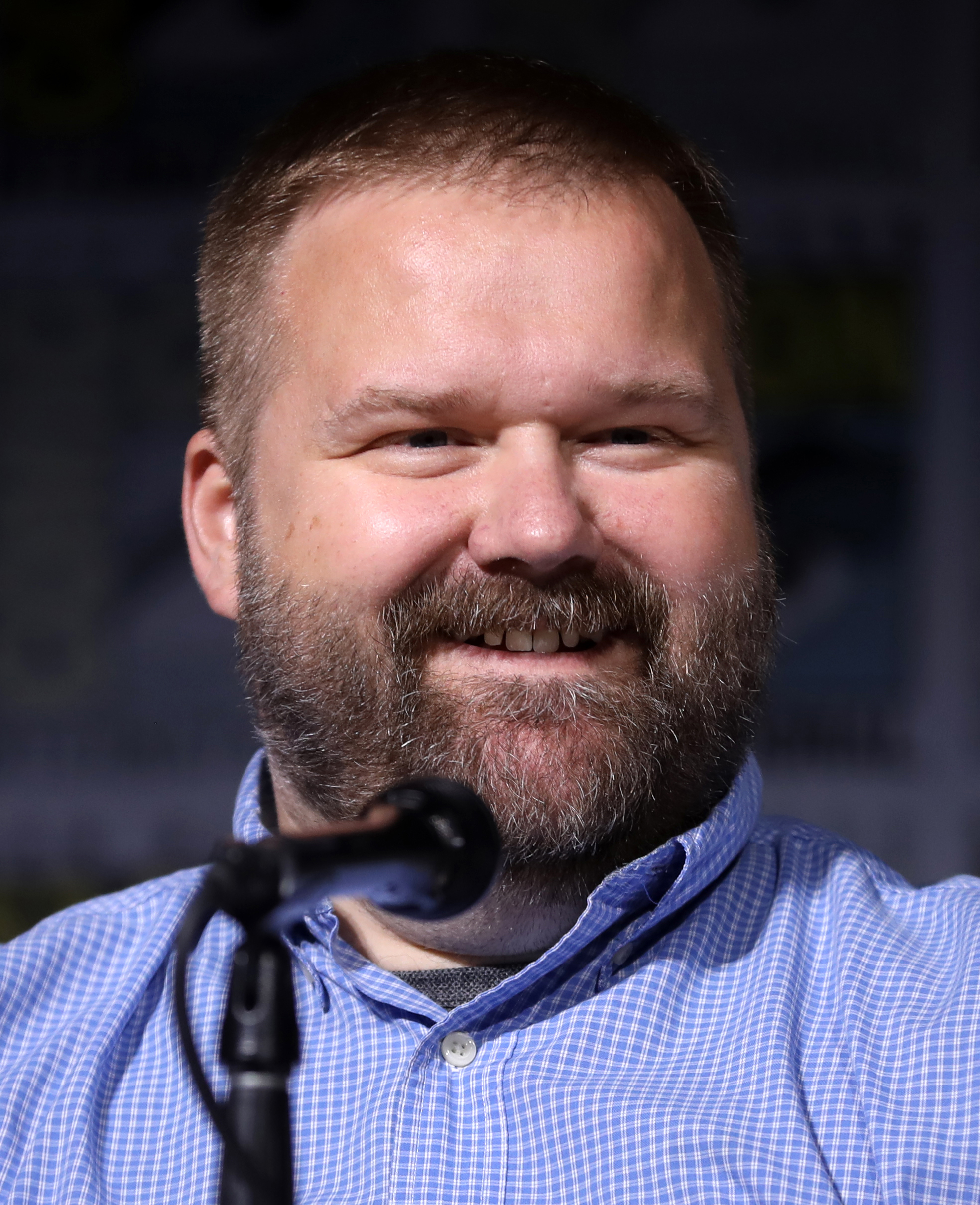
Robert Kirkman helped Telltale develop The Walking Dead.

During the game's development, Robert Kirkman and comic publisher Skybound Entertainment collaborated with Telltale. Kirkman, who had enjoyed Telltale's Strong Bad's Cool Game for Attractive People, appreciated their storytelling focus and player engagement. Telltale's proposal, centered on decision-making and survival rather than action, appealed to him. Kirkman provided oversight on story elements for The Walking Dead universe while remaining hands-off in development. The CEO of Telltale, Dan Connors, noted that Kirkman's involvement helped shape the story and introduce new characters while incorporating established ones from the comics. However, Kirkman requested not to include Rick Grimes due to his long-term plans for the character. Although initially unimpressed with an early build, Kirkman praised the near-final version of the game, saying, "Holy shit guys, you did it".

Telltale drew inspiration from various media when developing The Walking Dead. Gameplay-wise, they referenced titles like Heavy Rain and the Uncharted series for in-game cinematics, while the player-choice mechanic was influenced by the Mass Effect series. They also sought inspiration from television shows like Game of Thrones and Mad Men for developing well-rounded characters within a short timeframe. Connors also believed that traditional conversation systems often lacked a "believable rhythm", leading to the introduction of a timed input system for more realistic dialogue.

The game's story was designed with the final scene of the fifth episode—where Clementine either shoots Lee or leaves him to become a walker—as the established ending that the game would build toward. Clementine's role was considered critical to the game's writing, with the team focusing on making her a "moral compass" while ensuring that as a child character, she wasn't perceived as whiny or annoying. Similarly, Lee, the game's Black protagonist, was designed to incorporate his race without making it integral to the story; instead, societal reactions shaped the character without dictating the narrative's direction. The Stranger scene in the hotel was also planned early on to evaluate the player's moral choices. According to Sean Vanaman, each episode was developed by pairing a writer with a game designer to ensure cohesive plot and gameplay. Some gameplay ideas were discarded, such as a scene with the survivor group firing at zombies, as they did not fit the desired sense of panic.

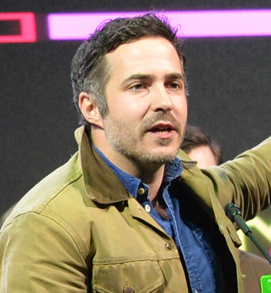
Sean Vanaman directed and wrote most of The Walking Dead.

==== Choice ====
A major aspect of writing The Walking Dead was the concept of choice and consequence, particularly regarding life and death for both the player and non-player characters. Telltale, founded by former LucasArts employees who had worked on games where the player could not die, incorporated player death if decisions weren't made quickly enough. Additionally, the player's choices could lead to the permanent deaths of non-player characters. This time-sensitive decision-making came from the prototype zombie game Muckenhoupt made and was designed to maintain the game's pace. This led to the idea of tracking player decisions globally, and Telltale expanded their tracking tools to accommodate for such an idea.

Telltale aimed to immerse players in the story through non-game-ending choices, reducing the desire to use the rewind feature. Although choices were designed to seem significant, they often had little effect on the larger narrative. According to writer Gary Whitta, all choices were meant to be equally difficult, and the writers worked to keep the dialogue neutral to create an even split among player decisions. For example, in Episode 1, most players chose to save Carley over Doug when each is attacked by walkers, and in Episode 2, most opted to cut off the teacher's leg rather than leave him behind to the walkers. In response, Telltale adjusted dialogue in later episodes to eliminate any perceived "right" choice, leaving the notion up to the player themself.

The writers of the game had to balance the established characters and timeline from the comic series while allowing for player choice. For instance, in the first episode, players are introduced to Shawn Greene, who is depicted as a walker in the comics. To remain consistent, the story ensures that Shawn is always bitten, though players are given the option to attempt to save him. This choice doesn't affect Shawn's fate but influences Kenny's perception of Lee. Telltale also designed characters and choices with player biases in mind. Larry, a harsh character introduced early on, was expected to be disliked by most players. In response, Telltale created a scene in the second episode where Larry's daughter, Lilly, attempts to redeem him in the player's eyes, hoping to sway the player's perception of Larry. This worked as intended, with 75% of players choosing to attempt to save Larry when he suffers a heart attack.

Player decisions also shaped the narrative in future episodes. In the fourth episode, for instance, Whitta referenced player choices about Duck's death—specifically who was to kill him—from episode 3 to design a similar moral dilemma where Kenny confronts the death of another boy and players must choose whether he or Kenny should kill him, or whether they should walk away, negatively impacting other characters' view of Lee. The fifth episode's first act contained 32 possible variations, based on past player decisions, which helped make the experience feel personalized and organic to each player rather than following a predetermined path through the game.

=== Technical ===
The Walking Dead's game engine was optimized for multi-platform release, including PCs, gaming consoles and mobile devices, to simplify porting. Despite this, the development team tailored control schemes for each platform, particularly using their experience from the Back to the Future game to refine touchscreen controls on mobile devices. One major challenge across all five episodes was the save game format, which required frequent updates and fixes across platforms, sometimes invalidating existing saves. Unique fixes on one platform would often resurface as issues on others. Connors noted that for future series, they would address save game issues more carefully, using insights gained from the first season.

Telltale previously struggled to synchronize multi-platform releases, particularly due to scheduling issues on Xbox Live Arcade for the Xbox 360. As a small publisher, they had to work with larger publishers to secure release slots months in advance, complicating coordination with other platforms. After the success of Back to the Future: The Game and Jurassic Park: The Game, Telltale achieved publisher status on Xbox Live, giving them more control over release timing. Additionally, they designed The Walking Dead so that episodes 2–5 would be treated as downloadable content, bypassing slot scheduling and enabling same-day release on PCs and consoles.

== Marketing and release ==
The Walking Dead was initially announced as a five-episode series, with releases planned approximately on a monthly basis as digital downloads for Windows, OS X, Xbox 360, and PlayStation 3. Originally slated for late 2011, the release was delayed until April 2012, coinciding with the conclusion of the second season of The Walking Dead television show, allowing the game to benefit from the show's growing popularity.

Following the digital releases, Telltale Games announced a physical disc release for the complete series on December 11, 2012, for the same platforms. A special Collector's Edition was made available exclusively at GameStop in North America, featuring artwork by Charlie Adlard and The Walking Dead: Compendium One, a collection of the first 48 issues of the comic series by Robert Kirkman. After this retail release, some Xbox 360 users reported performance issues due to storage limitations, leading Telltale to offer free digital download codes as compensation. The game was also adapted for handheld consoles. An iOS version was launched in August 2012, followed by a PlayStation Vita port in March 2013. After releasing all five episodes on the App Store, Telltale offered the first episode for free, something they had done in the past, as doing so, according to Dan Connors, "opens the funnel and gets it out to more people who can then convert into the [full] game".

In November 2013, Telltale announced a Game of the Year Edition, available for PC, Xbox 360, and PlayStation 3, which included the five episodes, the 400 Days DLC, the original score, and a behind-the-scenes feature. A year later, in October 2014, versions for PlayStation 4 and Xbox One were released, with a Nintendo Switch version following in August 2018, which also included the 400 Days content. Additionally, a virtual pinball table based on The Walking Dead, developed in collaboration with Zen Studios, was released on August 27, 2014, as downloadable content for Zen Pinball 2 and Pinball FX 2. This pinball adaptation featured designs representing set pieces from all five episodes and included animated models of characters Lee and Clementine.

== Reception ==
Aggregate review scores
Game	Metacritic
Episode 1 – A New Day	(PS3) 84 (PC) 82 (X360) 79
Episode 2 – Starved for Help	(PC) 84 (X360) 84 (PS3) 84
Episode 3 – Long Road Ahead	(X360) 88 (PS3) 87 (PC) 85
Episode 4 – Around Every Corner	(X360) 82 (PS3) 81 (PC) 80
Episode 5 – No Time Left	(PC) 89 (X360) 89 (PS3) 88
Special Episode – 400 Days	(X360) 80 (PS3) 78 (PC) 78

=== Critical reception ===
The Walking Dead's critical reception was "generally favorable", according to review aggregator website Metacritic, receiving a score of 89/100 based on 14 critic reviews. as it was praised for the harsh emotional tone, the characters, particularly the connection established between Lee and Clementine, story and the resemblance to the original comic book, though there was some criticism towards technical glitches. Oli Welsh of Eurogamer called the game "a serious, solid, but clay-footed work", while IGN's Greg Miller called the game "something special" and named its story "a tale no one should miss".

"Episode 1 – A New Day" received positive reviews. Aggregating review websites GameRankings and Metacritic gave the PlayStation 3 version 85.14% and 84/100, the Xbox 360 version 83.87% and 79/100 and the PC version 83.38% and 82/100. The game received various accolades including the IGN "Editors' Choice", PC Gamer "Editors' Choice", Xbox Editors' Choice Award, and the PlayStation Gold Award.

"Episode 2 – Starved for Help" received positive reviews. Aggregating review websites GameRankings and Metacritic gave the PC version 86.53% and 84/100, the Xbox 360 version 86.26% and 84/100 and the PlayStation 3 version 85.90% and 84/100. The game won the GameSpy E3 2012 award for "Best Adventure Game".

"Episode 3 – Long Road Ahead" received positive reviews. Aggregating review websites GameRankings and Metacritic gave the Xbox 360 version 88.47% and 88/100, the PlayStation 3 version 86.11% and 87/100 and the PC version 85.41% and 85/100. IGN's Greg Miller gave it a 9 out of 10, saying "It's a disturbing, depressing and entertaining entry in a journey that's been nothing short of excellent so far." GameSpot gave the game an 8.5, saying "The Walking Dead has passed the midway point of its series of five episodes with every indication that the game will keep getting better right through to its inevitably depressing and unsettling conclusion." MTV also gave it a positive review, saying "Telltale has created a series of wrenching, emotional decisions in the middle of a collection of not-too-hard puzzles in a visually-impressive adaptation of the Robert Kirkman comic series (with some nods to the TV show)."

"Episode 4 – Around Every Corner" received positive reviews. Aggregating review websites GameRankings and Metacritic gave the PC version 84.00% and 80/100, the Xbox 360 version 82.50% and 82/100 and the PlayStation 3 version 78.94% and 81/100.

"Episode 5 – No Time Left" received critical acclaim. Aggregating review websites GameRankings and Metacritic gave the PC version 94.75% and 89/100, the Xbox 360 version 88.15% and 89/100 and the PlayStation 3 version 87.75% and 88/100.

400 Days received positive reviews. Aggregating review websites GameRankings and Metacritic gave the PlayStation 3 version 78.20% and 78/100, the PC version 78.00% and 78/100 and the Xbox 360 version 76.88% and 80/100.

=== Sales ===
The Walking Dead achieved significant commercial success, supported by digital distribution. The first episode topped the Xbox Live Arcade charts for two weeks starting April 30, and it topped sales on PlayStation Network and Steam for a week. Within 20 days, it sold one million copies (excluding iOS), becoming Telltale's fastest-selling title. By the release of the third episode, 3.8 million episodes had been sold to 1.2 million players. By January 2013, sales exceeded 8.5 million episodes, generating about $40 million in revenue. Dan Connors noted that iOS accounted for 25% of sales, with significant growth in late 2012 driven by App Store discounts. By the release of 400 Days, over 17 million episodes had been sold worldwide, rising to 21 million by October 2013 and 28 million by July 2014.

=== Accolades ===
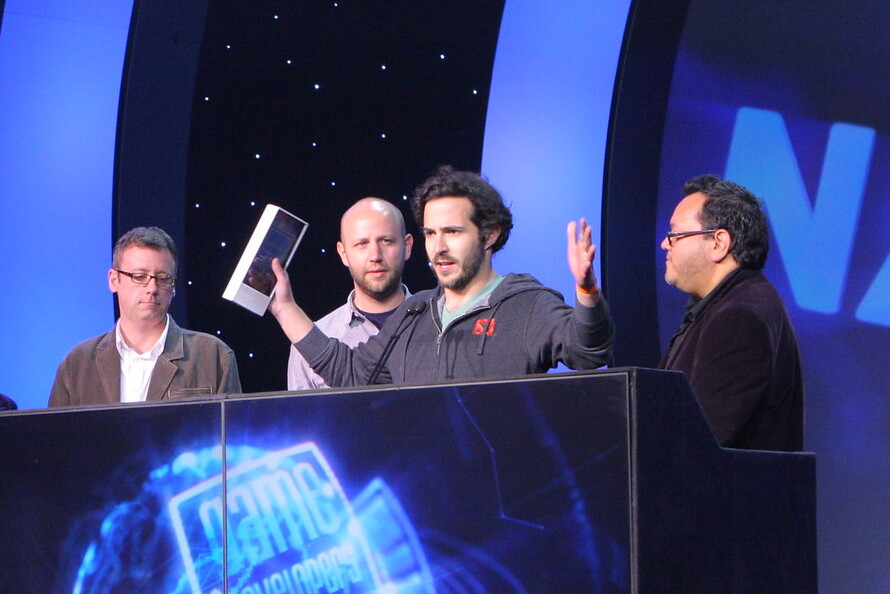
The Walking Dead developers accepting "Best Narrative" at the Game Developers Choice Awards

The Walking Dead has received numerous accolades from a variety of publications and organizations since 2012. It was recognized as "Game of the Year" by USA Today, Wired, GamesRadar+, Official Xbox Magazine, Destructoid, Digital Trends, and Yahoo! Games.

Award	Date	Category	Recipient(s) and nominee(s)	Result	Ref(s).
Spike Video Game Awards	December 7, 2012	Game of the Year	The Walking Dead	Won	
Spike Video Game Awards	December 7, 2012	Studio of the Year	Telltale Games	Won	
Spike Video Game Awards	December 7, 2012	Best Adapted Video Game	The Walking Dead	Won	
Spike Video Game Awards	December 7, 2012	Best Performance by a Human Male	Dave Fennoy as Lee Everett	Nominated	
Spike Video Game Awards	December 7, 2012	Best Performance by a Human Female	Melissa Hutchison as Clementine	Won	
Spike Video Game Awards	December 7, 2012	Best Downloadable Game	The Walking Dead	Won	
Inside Gaming Awards	December 8, 2012	Best Downloadable Game	The Walking Dead	Won	
Inside Gaming Awards	December 8, 2012	Best Character Design	Lee Everett	Won	
New York Game Awards	February 5, 2013	Big Apple Award for Best Videogame	The Walking Dead	Won	
New York Game Awards	February 5, 2013	Herman Melville Award for Best Videogame Writing	The Walking Dead	Won	
New York Game Awards	February 5, 2013	The Off Broadway Award for Best Independent Game	The Walking Dead	Won	
New York Game Awards	February 5, 2013	The Best Acting	Melissa Hutchison as Clementine	Won	
D.I.C.E. Awards	February 7, 2013	Game of the Year	The Walking Dead	Nominated	
D.I.C.E. Awards	February 7, 2013	Outstanding Achievement in Game Direction	The Walking Dead	Nominated	
D.I.C.E. Awards	February 7, 2013	Outstanding Innovation in Gaming	The Walking Dead	Nominated	
D.I.C.E. Awards	February 7, 2013	Outstanding Achievement in Gameplay Engineering	The Walking Dead	Nominated	
D.I.C.E. Awards	February 7, 2013	Adventure Game of the Year	The Walking Dead	Won	
D.I.C.E. Awards	February 7, 2013	Downloadable Game of the Year	The Walking Dead	Won	
D.I.C.E. Awards	February 7, 2013	Outstanding Character Performance - Male or Female	Lee Everett	Won	
D.I.C.E. Awards	February 7, 2013	Outstanding Achievement in Story	The Walking Dead	Won	
British Academy Video Games Awards	March 5, 2013	Story	The Walking Dead	Won	
British Academy Video Games Awards	March 5, 2013	Mobile & Handheld	The Walking Dead	Won	
British Academy Video Games Awards	March 5, 2013	Best Game	The Walking Dead	Nominated	
British Academy Video Games Awards	March 5, 2013	Game Design	The Walking Dead	Nominated	
British Academy Video Games Awards	March 5, 2013	Original Music	The Walking Dead development team	Nominated	
British Academy Video Games Awards	March 5, 2013	Performer	Melissa Hutchison as Clementine	Nominated	
British Academy Video Games Awards	March 5, 2013	Performer	Dave Fennoy as Lee Everett	Nominated	
Game Developers Choice Awards	March 27, 2013	Best Narrative	The Walking Dead	Won	
Game Developers Choice Awards	March 27, 2013	Game of the Year	The Walking Dead	Nominated	
Game Developers Choice Awards	March 27, 2013	Best Downloadable Game	The Walking Dead	Nominated	
Italian Video Game Awards	April 16, 2013	Best Mobile Game	The Walking Dead	Won	

== Sequels and legacy ==
Following the success of the first series, Telltale began developing a second season, with the first episode released in late 2013. Connors stated they aimed to build on players' favorite elements from the first season, while considering story continuation and potential character ties to the TV show. In February 2013, Whitta hinted at additional content before Season Two, later revealed as 400 Days. Revealed at the 2013 Electronic Entertainment Expo and released in July 2013, this content introduced five new characters and carried decisions from The Walking Dead into Season Two. Telltale released a three-episode mini-series, The Walking Dead: Michonne, in 2016. The first episode of Season Three, The Walking Dead: A New Frontier, launched in December 2016, followed by a physical season pass in February 2017. The fourth and final season, The Walking Dead: The Final Season, concluded in 2019.

The Walking Dead has been credited with revitalizing the adventure game genre, which had experienced a decline in popularity since the 1990s. The game's emphasis on narrative-driven, choice-based gameplay is regarded as having "paved the way" for subsequent titles that adopted a similar approach, such as Life Is Strange and The Quarry, both of which focus on player choices and their impact on the story.
