= Miles Teves =

American sculptor

Death Scene of Sho Cora-Tra, Sholari of Tashka by Miles Teves, originally created for the box cover of the fantasy RPG Skyrealms of Jorune, 1985

Miles Teves (born 1963, Salinas, California) is a Hollywood artist and conceptual designer who works on television productions, films, and computer games.

== Education ==
Miles Teves studied sculpture at the Art Center College of Design. In 1982, when Teves was 18, he showed some of his artwork to special make-up effects creator Rob Bottin.

== Career ==
In 1983, Bottin brought Teves onto the special effects staff for the movie Legend to create the conceptual artwork for the character Darkness.

During this time, Teves co-created the role-playing game SkyRealms of Jorune (1984) with his high school friend Andrew Leker, and also supplied the interior and cover artwork.

With the release of Legend in 1985, Teves turned to the silver screen, working on Explorers, RoboCop, The Witches of Eastwick, Total Recall, Batman & Robin, Hollow Man, Spider-Man, Terminator 3: Rise of the Machines, Reign of Fire, Van Helsing, Pirates of the Caribbean: The Curse of the Black Pearl, The Chronicles of Riddick, Little Fockers (2010) and Pirates of the Caribbean: On Stranger Tides(2011).

His work has included sculpting pieces as realistic as Tom Cruise's head for Interview with the Vampire and as fantastical as Kong in King Kong.

== Reception ==
In his 2023 book Monsters, Aliens, and Holes in the Ground, RPG historian Stu Horvath reviewed the fantasy science fiction role-playing game Skyrealms of Jorune and noted "Much of the bizarreness is thanks to the fabulous work of illustrator and co-designer Miles Teves, whose realistic style gives Jorune an uncanny verisimilitude. It is on display in his painting for the front of the box, a tableau in Renaissance style, depicting the 'Death Scene of Sho Cora-Tra, Sholari of Tashka.' I don't know what that means, but the painting still transmits great emotional weight, despite the aliens."
