= Andrew Leker =

Role-playing game designer

- Occupation: Game designer

Andrew Leker is a game designer who has worked primarily on role-playing games.

== Career ==
Andrew Leker was an undergraduate student in physics and applied mathematics at UC Berkeley in the early 1980s, when he began to develop a roleplaying game with the very alien world of Jorune for a setting, which was initially a variant of Metamorphosis Alpha by TSR. Leker started his own company SkyRealms Publishing and self-published his RPG SkyRealms of Jorune (1984). Leker had finished college by the late 1980s, and began a career in the computer gaming field. Leker founded a company called Mind Control Software in 1994. The first project from this new company was the computer game Alien Logic (1994), which was based on his world of Jorune and was published by SSI. Later he produced Silencer (beta), and the IGF awarded Oasis (2005).
