= Sander Cohen =

BioShock character

- BioShock character
- Sander Cohen from BioShock
- First appearance: BioShock (2007)
- Voiced by: T. Ryder Smith

Sander Cohen is a character in the BioShock video game series. He debuts in the first title of the series, developed by 2K Boston, as a celebrated polymath of the underwater city of Rapture who has a deranged and sadistic personality. The protagonist Jack is forced to help Cohen with the creation of a macabre sculpture, built around pictures of Cohen's former proteges whom he kills and photographs on his behalf, before he allows him to leave his domain Fort Frolic. Sander Cohen makes another appearance in BioShock Infinite: Burial at Sea, a downloadable content story expansion for BioShock Infinite which sets up the events of BioShock. He is voiced by T. Ryder Smith for all appearances.

Aspects of Sander Cohen's characterization are based on several real-world historical figures. The development team for BioShock 2 had considered reintroducing Cohen for the game, but discarded their plans for the character prior to the game's release. Cohen is generally well received and considered one of the most memorable characters of the BioShock series. Various commentators in video game reviews, retrospective features, and literary publications particularly highlighted Cohen's role in the story of the first BioShock.

== Concept and design ==
Sander Cohen is presented as an unhinged Jewish American creative professional. Cohen's character traits and name were influenced by American entertainer George M. Cohan, who was a notable playwright, composer, lyricist, actor, singer and dancer. However, BioShock creator Ken Levine deliberately wrote Cohen to be an untalented songwriter. His physical appearance, specifically his pencil moustache, evokes surrealist artist Salvador Dalí. Cohen's pancaked make-up was inspired by a scene with Bette Davis' character Baby Jane Hudson in the film What Ever Happened to Baby Jane?

In BioShock, Sander Cohen controls an area known as Fort Frolic, which serves as the game's seventh level. He was given jurisdiction over Fort Frolic by the city's founder, Andrew Ryan, prior to the events of the game. It is presented as a neon-lit adult playground, where the protagonist Jack must acquiesce to Cohen's request to take revenge against his former proteges on his behalf. The design of the level was led by Jordan Thomas, who later served as the director of BioShock 2. Thomas explained in an interview with PC Gamer that the manner in which a semi-abandoned space like Fort Frolic comes to life with power restored asserts, wordlessly, that it is a character unto itself. The ambience of Fort Frolic's atrium area is also intended to convey the subtle notion that Cohen's emotional state is intrinsically linked to the place: for example, when Cohen speaks the lights in the room turn purple, or turn red to mirror his anger if the player performs an offending action such as attacking his artwork.

Examples of what appear to be Cohen's works of sculptural art, which are in fact the remains of his human victims encased in plaster, can be found throughout Fort Frolic. According to Thomas, Cohen's obsession with the statues is "psychodrama externalised." It was aesthetically inspired by Norman Bates’ mother in Psycho and Rupert Pupkin’s imaginary basement audience in Martin Scorsese’s The King of Comedy. Cohen's sexual orientation is not explicitly defined or explained in BioShock. It is implied through dialogue lines by his estranged proteges, Silas Cobb and Martin Finnegan, who both refer to Cohen as an "old fruit." Atlas also calls Cohen a "section eight", a military discharge for personnel mentally unfit, or for someone of a different sexual orientation than heterosexual. Cohen himself refers to Andrew Ryan as "the man I once loved." Thomas explains that they were trying to hint at Cohen's conflict with his own sexuality without delving into pornographic themes. Levine confirmed in a 2016 tweet on social media that he intended Cohen to be a gay man.

Cohen was intended at one point to return in BioShock 2 as a "20-foot-tall Freudian monster bunny". Concept art by Eric Sterner was made for a three-act dream sequence level entitled "The Queen & The Rabbit", which would have featured a chess match between The Queen and The Rabbit, held by Cohen. T. Ryder Smith, the voice actor for Sander Cohen, was set to record the voice for the rabbit creature. Smith asked what the robotic rabbit is supposed to look like and was instructed to visualise the creature as the Trojan Horse crossed with a rabbit. The recordings were never used. The Kinetoscope videos for The Black Dream and The March Hare in Burial at Sea - Episode 1, which depicts Cohen's artistic bent, were composed by Bill Gardner.

== Appearances ==
Prior to Jack's arrival in Rapture in 1960, Sander Cohen was personally invited by Andrew Ryan to reside in the underwater city he founded, Rapture. Based out of Fort Frolic, he was once one of Rapture's more respected musicians and playwrights, as he was responsible for composing the city's anthem. Following Rapture's civil war and the chaotic months that followed it, the entirety of Fort Frolic is locked down to prevent its inhabitants from escaping. Cohen's mental state would deteriorate as he grew frustrated with the lack of an appreciative audience for his work. An audio diary found in Fort Frolic reveals that Cohen came to regret his decision to move to Rapture.

When Jack approaches a bathysphere terminal meant for travel to the Hephaestus area which houses the office of Andrew Ryan, Cohen blocks radio contact with his ally Atlas and submerges the Bathysphere, trapping Jack in the level. Cohen kills one of his disciples, Kyle Fitzpatrick, in front of Jack and then asks him to photograph his corpse. Cohen then demands that Jack help him complete his "Masterpiece" – a tetraptych called the Quadtych, by killing three other individuals: Martin Finnegan, Silas Cobb, and Hector Rodriguez, who had either betrayed or displeased Cohen in the past. Once all four photographs are placed in the Quadtych installation, an appreciative Cohen reveals himself and allows Jack to proceed. At this point, the player may leave or kill Cohen. If Cohen is spared, he can be found in his luxury apartment in Mercury Suite later in the game. He will welcome Jack into his home, and invite him to look around. Cohen can be killed at this point as well, after a pair of dancing Splicers are defeated. Cohen's likeness appears in a series of in-game comic book covers as part of the non-canon "Challenge Rooms" which were originally part of an exclusive downloadable content package for the PlayStation 3 version of the game but was made available on other platforms in later re-releases of the game.

Sander Cohen appears in the first part of the Bioshock Infinite DLC Burial at Sea. Although Rapture has not yet fallen into chaos, Cohen appears to be showing signs of mental instability already. During the encounter with Cohen, he is revealed to be involved with the human trafficking activities targeting the Little Sisters. During the second part of the DLC, Elizabeth reveals that she had worked with Cohen as a songstress for months after she first arrived in Rapture.

To commemorate the success of BioShock, employees for 2K Boston were each gifted a 6-inch scale model of Cohen by Ken Levine during a work function. The statuettes were designed by Irrational Games artist Robb Waters and produced by figurine company Patch Together.

== Critical reception ==
Sander Cohen has received acclaim from critics in retrospective commentary features. In her column for GameSetWatch, Leigh Alexander thought Cohen's whimsical mannerisms and facial features reminded her of American composer Cole Porter. She formed the view that the character designers responsible for Cohen's poignant and tragic personality may have been intimately acquainted with theatre people. The development and cultural impact of the Fort Frolic level was the subject of a 2017 feature article by Andy Kelly of PC Gamer, with Kelly singling out Cohen's introduction as one of BioShock's most memorable moments. Mark Brown from the video game analysis series Game Maker's Toolkit described Sander Cohen and Fort Frolic to be some of the most captivating parts of BioShock in a YouTube video; Brown's opinion was echoed by Ashley Oh from Polygon, who called Cohen one of BioShock's most "terrifyingly charismatic characters" due to the juxtaposition in which the game presents his grace and elegance as well as his brutality and unpredictable temperament. Polygon also add that Cohen is "certainly not [a character] you’ll forget any time soon.".

The character has appeared in multiple "top" character lists. IGN listed Cohen as the 89th best video game villain, stating that his needs are more concrete than the two primary antagonists of BioShock. They added that he is, as are the other antagonists, only a few shades away from sanity, making him seem more realistic and relatable as a character. GamesRadar included Cohen their top 7 list of "mentally damaged characters we love" in video games, noting that he stood out among BioShock's mentally challenged cast of characters. 1UP.com stated that his presence made the "Fort Frolic" area of BioShock one of the most fondly remembered, and further stated that his character "expertly balanced both geniality and maliciousness in one disturbing package". In 2008, PC Zone named him PC gaming's fourth best character ever conceived in gaming, calling him their favorite "mad bastard" in the game and adding that in comparison to other major characters in the game, "Cohen’s relentless theatrics in the face of desolation bowled us over". GamesTM also listed him among the greatest ever video game characters in a 2010 feature, opining that he is BioShock's "quintessential character", and it "is impossible to imagine the game without him."

Not all reception to the character has been positive. Christian Guyton from TechRadar criticized Cohen as an example of bad LGBT representation, and argued that his "orientation is meaningless in context", only serving to infer a correlation between depravity and homosexuality.

Jonathan Nolan, co-creator of the Westworld television series, referenced many aspects of the BioShock series for certain episodes, including a cameo reference to Cohen's visage. Cohen was featured as part of the core cast of characters in a loose musical adaptation of the BioShock series by performers from the John Burroughs High School Powerhouse choir. The musical won the Hart Encore 2022 show choir competition.
