= Brigid Tenenbaum =

Video game character

- BioShock character
- Brigid Tenenbaum in BioShock 2
- First appearance: BioShock (2007)
- Created by: Ken Levine
- Voiced by: Anne Bobby

In-universe information
- Nationality: Belarusian

Brigid Tenenbaum is a fictional character in the BioShock video game series developed by Irrational Games. She is a Belarusian Jew who survived the Holocaust due to assisting in Nazi human experimentation, and was eventually invited to the underwater city of Rapture, where she continued human experimentation. She discovered a substance that altered DNA that was highly addictive, using little girls as hosts, before developing compassion for them and attempting to save them from their parasites.

Various aspects of her character have been the subject of discussion by critics, including her ethnicity, autism, and gender. Her initial lack of empathy was suggested in a paper to be spreading the implication that people with autism lacked empathy, a sentiment other people shared after Levine discussed it in an interview. He later clarified that her autism was not the source of her lack of empathy, but rather, her experiences with the Holocaust contributed to it.

== Concept and creation ==
Brigid Tenenbaum was created by BioShock director Ken Levine. She is a German Jew who is autistic. She was a victim of the Holocaust and the sole survivor of her family. She managed to survive due to her usefulness in conducting Nazi human experimentation. When discussing both her ethnicity and autism, Levine noted that "Tenenbaum's a highly functioning autistic. Those are instrumental in getting her to that place, but a different autistic Jew wouldn't have ended up there, because there is something about her and what she wants – her absolute adoration of science – to the point where she fails to see every other thing." He noted that she was blinded to the horrors of her actions, and argued that the Holocaust corrupted her sense of morality. He discussed how her eventual change to develop empathy was an unwanted change, but one that occurred nonetheless. Some questioned Levine's invocation of autism in this interview, causing him to explain that autism did not define her lack of empathy. She is portrayed by Anne Bobby.

== Appearances ==
Before the events of her first appearance in BioShock, Tenenbaum was imprisoned in the Auschwitz concentration camp by the Nazis. She was the only member of her family to survive, owing to her assisting the Nazis in their human experimentation. She became a geneticist, and was invited to join the underwater city of Rapture by its leader Andrew Ryan. Tenenbaum discovered a species of sea slug there that was able to rewrite DNA, calling the substance ADAM. She worked with gangster Frank Fontaine, who offered her funding to conduct human experimentation. She found that the best way to produce it was to have little girls, called Little Sisters, serve as hosts to the slugs. ADAM became widespread, due in part to its addictive nature. It caused people to degrade from its use. She developed empathy for the Little Sisters, refusing to continue work on them, leading to her being replaced. She worked in secret to abduct Little Sisters and to try to cure them of their parasite.

During the events of BioShock, Tenenbaum crosses paths with the protagonist Jack, and she implores him to rescue the Little Sisters, which are guarded by Big Daddies. The player may choose whether to do so, gaining less ADAM but receiving other rewards, or gaining more ADAM from the Little Sisters if he kills them instead. Much later in the game, Jack is helped by Tenenbaum and her cured Little Sisters to track down Fontaine, finally killing the crime boss by draining him of the ADAM he needs to survive after splicing into an inhuman monster; Jack then leaves Rapture with Tenenbaum and the girls.

In BioShock 2, Tenenbaum discovers that girls are being abducted near shorelines, leading her to take a submarine down to Rapture to investigate. She finds that Sofia Lamb is behind these abductions, turning the girls into new Little Sisters; Tenenbaum attempts to cure these as well, but she is impeded by Lamb. She collaborates with Sofia's daughter, Eleanor, who has a psychic connection with the Little Sisters, and asks Tenenbaum to help awaken a Big Daddy called Subject Delta. Tenenbaum aims to cure the dependency on ADAM and succeeds, leaving Delta to be guided by her ally Augustus Sinclair after she departs. Tenenbaum's story is continued in BioShock 2's DLC Minerva's Den, set shortly after she parts ways with Subject Delta in the main game. In it, she works together with the Big Daddy Subject Sigma, formerly Charles Milton Porter, in order to retrieve the schematics of the Thinker, Rapture's operating supercomputer set within Minerva's Den, the city's technology center now controlled by the insane Reed Wahl. After Sigma succeeds in this and defeats Wahl, he escapes Rapture with Tenenbaum, who is able to restore back his humanity.

== Reception ==
Brigid Tenenbaum has been the subject of discussion and analysis by critics. Writer Juho Matias Puro felt that she was one of the "most interesting maternal characters" in modern Western video games, discussing how she is a mother figure during her experimentation, but holding more regard for science than empathy. However, they were critical of her arc being the product of the development of her maternal instincts. Namely, that, rather than her own agency being responsible for her developing empathy, it was simply a biological function. Nevertheless, he felt she was interesting due to representing both "the caring mother and the twisted, evil version; sadistic instead of nurturing, hurtful and disregarding instead of comforting." Authors of the book Beyond the Sea: Navigating Bioshock discussed how being raised in a fascist regime made intimacy an alien concept to her, which lead to her viewing her maternal instinct as an "abomination." They argued that the Little Sisters were a reflection of herself and her endeavours, suggesting that, despite her lack of monstrous features like others in Rapture, the Little Sisters reflected her monstrosity.

The Guardian staff analyzed Tenenbaum among other female video game characters, describing her as a "disturbing study in motherhood, creation, and amorality. They discussed her history in Auschwitz working under Josef Mengele, as well as the eventual empathy she gained for the Little Sisters. Her autism was the subject of discussion in the paper Characters with Autism Spectrum Disorder in Fiction: Where are the Women and Girls? The authors discussed the stereotype of people with autism lacking empathy, arguing that this is perpetuated by Tenenbaum's indifference to the suffering of others during the Holocaust. Author Ewan Kirkland discussed the contrast between masculinity and femininity in BioShock, noting how the two female doctors in the game, Tenenbaum being one of them, were depicted positively due in part to Brigid's attempts to protect the Little Sisters, where other pivotal characters, such as Andrew Ryan and Frank Fontaine, were "self-centred masculine megalomaniacs."

Brigid was also analyzed as a Jewish character. Kotaku writer Cody Mello-Klein discussed how Brigid came to Rapture because she, as a Jewish person, felt a displacement and lack of control, arguing that she became "reflections and distortions of these themes, examples of what happens when people are put under the pressures of history, time, and trauma" in her times at Rapture. He also touched upon how she became a tormentor herself, saying that she served as an example of how trauma can cause people to adopt their tormentors' methods. Pittsburgh Jewish Chronicle writer Jillian Diamond discussed the propensity of Jewish characters in Rapture, noting how her story was "inextricably tied to her Judaism." They touched upon the complexities of her character, namely her guilt, feeling that her and her identity as a Jewish woman in the Holocaust was central to BioShock's plot.
