= Silas Cobb =

Silas Cobb may refer to:

- Silas B. Cobb (1812–1900), American industrialist
- Silas T. Cobb, Union Army sentry who questioned John Wilkes Booth after Lincoln's assassination
- Silas Cobb, a fictional character from BioShock, known for being a former disciple of Sander Cohen
