= T. Ryder Smith =

American actor (b. 1958)

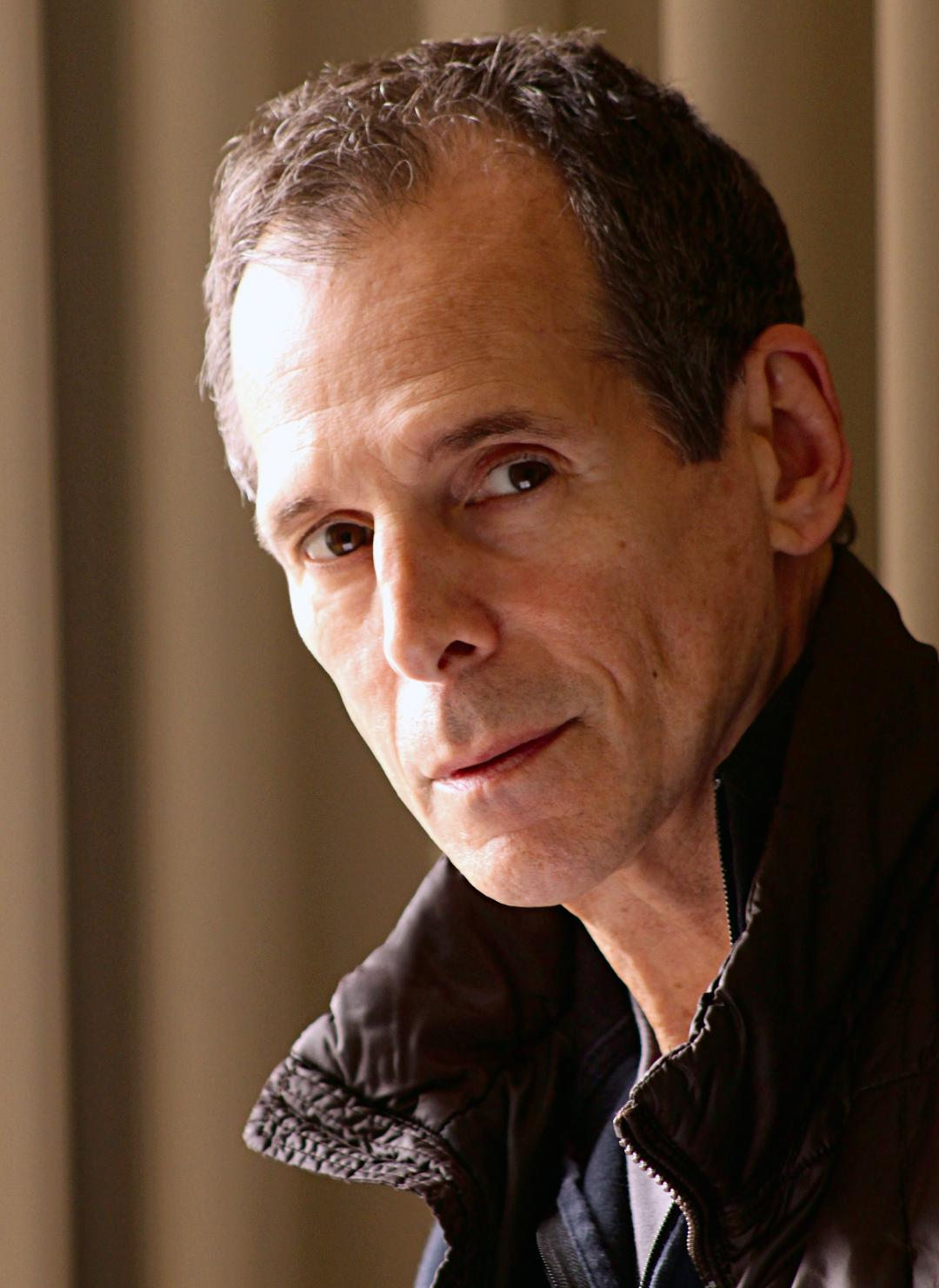
- Ryder in 2019
- Born: March 9, 1958 (age 68); New York
- Occupations: Actor, voice actor
- Years active: 1990-present
- Website: trydersmith.org

T. Ryder Smith (born March 9, 1958) is an American actor. A native of New York state and long-time resident of New York City, he appears frequently on stage, particularly in avant-garde theatre works, as well as on TV, film, and as a voice actor.

== Stage ==
Smith has appeared on Broadway in the world premiere of Oslo, the original American company of War Horse, both at Lincoln Center, and in the 2009 revival of Equus opposite Daniel Radcliffe and Richard Griffiths. Other work in NYC includes the world premieres of plays by Richard Foreman, David Greenspan, Katori Hall and Anne Washburn, and in Sarah Ruhl’s Passion Play and Dead Man's Cell Phone. Regional theatre work includes world premiere productions of plays by Sarah Ruhl, Mary Kathryn Nagle, Charles Mee, Tanya Barfield, Doug Wright, work with Theater of War, and the 2007 collaboration with artist/activist Paul Chan, The Classical Theatre of Harlem, and the public-arts presenters Creative Time to perform Samuel Beckett's play Waiting for Godot in the outdoor areas of New Orleans which had been most devastated by Hurricane Katrina. Video of the production and Chan’s set pieces are in the permanent collection at MOMA.

== Film, television and voice ==
Film and TV work includes appearances in the film The Report, TV guest-appearances on Bull, Hunters, The Blacklist, Elementary, Nurse Jackie, Blue Bloods, Law & Order Special Victims Unit and the PBS American Experience series The Abolitionists; playing "The Trickster" in the cyber-horror film Brainscan; Marie Losier's experimental short film The Ontological Cowboy, shown at the 2006 Whitney Biennial, experimental short films by Rachel Rose, Redmond Entwistle, and Lawrence Krauser, and as himself in MindFLUX, a documentary about theatre-artist Richard Foreman. He supplies the voices of Baron Ünderbheit and Otto Aquarius on the cartoon TV series The Venture Bros., the voice of Sander Cohen in the videogame BioShock, (and the BioShock Infinite DLC Burial at Sea) and appears in the annual Bloomsday readings of James Joyce's novel Ulysses on Pacifica radio station WBAI.

== Awards ==
- 2021 Audie award, Best Non-Fiction audiobook (narrator), Fire in Paradise.
- 2017 OBIE award, Outstanding Ensemble Cast, Oslo, NYC.
- 2007 Drama Desk award for Outstanding Ensemble Cast, Lebensraum, NYC.
- 2007 Craig Noel award, Outstanding Lead Performance, Lincolnesque, Old Globe Theatre, San Diego, CA.
- 2001 nomination: Drama Desk award, Outstanding Solo Performer, Underneath the Lintel, NYC.
