= Atlas (BioShock) =

BioShock character

Atlas Frank Fontaine
- BioShock character
- Atlas as he appears in BioShock Infinite: Burial at Sea
- First appearance: BioShock (2007)
- Created by: Ken Levine
- Voiced by: Karl Hanover

Atlas is a character in the BioShock video game series created by Ken Levine, published by 2K Games. He first appears in the first title of the series, where he sets himself up as a benefactor of Jack, the game's player character, upon his arrival in the underwater city of Rapture. During a pivotal scene later in the game's narrative, Atlas discloses that he is actually the crime lord Frank Fontaine in disguise, the main antagonist of the game, and that he had been manipulating Jack to act against the city's founder Andrew Ryan. It is also revealed that he is responsible for orchestrating Jack's mental conditioning during his infancy and later a chain of events that led to his subsequent arrival in Rapture. Atlas/Fontaine also appears in the sequel BioShock 2 through audio diaries, and more prominently in BioShock Infinite: Burial at Sea, a prequel which sets up the events of BioShock.

The character's name is intended to be a direct reference to Ayn Rand's 1957 novel Atlas Shrugged as well as its namesake, the mythological Atlas. Atlas serves as a guiding voice who provides a motivating factor for players to progress the game's narrative, as well as a subversion of how video games address their audience and define player agency through his use of an innocuous phrase in his messages to Jack as a form of mind control. Karl Hanover voiced the character: he used fellow Irish actor Gabriel Byrne's character from Miller's Crossing as a template and spoke in his native Dublin accent as Atlas. He adopted a regional American accent for the character's lines as Fontaine.

The character's dual identities as Atlas and Fontaine has been subject to significant discussion and critical analysis within the context of BioShock's setting and themes. Some critics described his role to be an important element of the series' exploration of player agency. The character's role as the final boss of BioShock is less well received, with much of the criticism focusing on his visual design as well as structure of the associated gameplay mechanics.

== Development ==
Early in the development of BioShock, game director Ken Levine sought to implement a novel method to instruct the player on their objectives as they progress through the game's narrative, as well as place restrictions on a player's access within levels beyond the traditional game design of encountering locked doors and finding keys to unlock them. Inspired by fictional mind-control methods depicted in movies like The Manchurian Candidate and its depiction of 1950s-era "subliminal messages", Levine came up with the idea that a non-player character had arranged a form of mental conditioning incorporated into the player character's biology, turning him into a programmed assassin in the process. The team agreed that the player character's actions could be controlled by a spoken trigger phrase, but struggled with coming up with one that would not signal the character's treachery. Levine later worked the phrase "Would you kindly" into the first script for the game after he encountered promotional materials that asked the reader hypothetical questions, such as "Would you kill people, even innocent people, to survive?".

Levine described Frank Fontaine as a predatory nihilist who lacks an essential humanizing quality. Levine developed the character's role as a villain by positioning him as an ideological contrast to his archenemy, Andrew Ryan. To Levine, both characters are extremists who are "almost equally dangerous", although "Fontaine is the only real monster in the game, because he has no ideals at all, and all Ryan has is ideal". On the other hand, he thought Fontaine is truer to himself compared to Ryan, because Ryan sacrifices his ideals when he forcibly takes over Fontaine's business using government power after failing to compete with Fontaine in the business world. The 2005 film Syriana inspired aspects of the backstory for Atlas/Fontaine, in particular his modus operandi of finding disadvantaged individuals through charitable initiatives like Fontaine's Home for the Poor and the Little Sisters Orphanage, an anathema to Ryan's objectivist worldview, only to cynically exploit them for his own ends. Aspects of his characterization was also inspired by the 1995 film The Usual Suspects, specifically its main antagonist Keyser Söze as well as a scene that revolves around a bulletin board.

Side by side comparison of the character model for Atlas' boss form (left), and a sculpture depicting the Titan Atlas (right).

Fontaine's alias is an explicit reference to the 1957 novel Atlas Shrugged by Ayn Rand, as well as the Titan Atlas. The developmental team went with Atlas/Fontaine as the final boss of BioShock, and the form the character takes for the fight visually alludes to typical classical sculptural depictions of Atlas. In this form, he is presented as a nude metal-skinned man who has injected himself with excessive amounts of ADAM, a genetic material that grants superhuman powers, severely altering his appearance to a grotesque vision of a god-like figure. Levine would openly express his regret over the design and implementation of the Atlas fight in the years following the release of BioShock. In a 2016 interview with Glixel, he admitted that the team went with a boss fight against Atlas as they did not have a better idea on how to properly present the game's conclusion.

=== Portrayal ===
Levine originally thought of Morgan Freeman as a potential voice actor for Frank Fontaine and his alter ego Atlas, but did not act on recruiting Freeman due to budgetary concerns. The character's original voice actor spoke like Freeman with a Southern drawl; this version of Atlas was featured in an internal critical playtest of BioShock which occurred in January 2007. Greg Baldwin was credited as the original voice actor for Atlas, and though he was eventually replaced in the final version of the game as the developmental team wanted to take the character in a different direction, his replacement Karl Hanover was not credited for the first game as he was not a member of the Screen Actors Guild at the time of his hiring.

When Hanover initially auditioned for the role, he was given a brief written paragraph of Atlas talking about in-universe concepts, and was asked to do an impression of an alcoholic Australian man as the character was originally written that way. Although Hanover is from Dublin and his exposure to spoken Australian English was limited to his childhood memories of the long-running television show Neighbours, he was chosen for the role over several Australian actors who had auditioned as his performance was judged to be the most authentic by developmental team members who are based in Australia. Levine was surprised by Hanover's shortlisting, but decided to choose him as the voice of Fontaine as well after he asked Hanover to record some lines of dialogue based on his own idea of how Danny DeVito would sound like. Levine decided to accommodate Hanover's actual cultural background, and had the character of Atlas rewritten to be an Irishman after he was impressed with Hanover's line delivery in his normal speaking voice. Certain lines of dialogue were also altered to include more explicit mentions of Atlas' supposed Irish identity. To develop the character's voice, Hanover was inspired by Gabriel Byrne's performance in the 1990 Miller's Crossing, where Byrne also delivered his lines in his native Dublin accent, but took care not to attempt an impression of Byrne in any way. For Fontaine, Hanover was instructed to perform with a Chicago accent and use J. E. Freeman's Miller's Crossing character Eddie Dane as an archetype in order to convey his intimidating tone.

The copy of the script which Hanover collected from his agent was about 40 pages long: aside from a collection of seemingly random lines spoken by Atlas and Fontaine, it did not include dialogue from any other characters, or any information about the in-game world of BioShock. To record his lines, Hanover stood before a music stand and a script with a big window in a recording booth that is about twice the size of a typical phone booth, with his recording work overseen by Levine and a group of technicians. Because he had no knowledge of any context behind the dialogue from reading the script, he had to be briefed with an overview of what they were trying to do prior to a recording session. During each recording session, he was personally guided by Levine through the recording headset he wore: Levine would tell him what was happening during a given scene, and Hanover would say a line in response. The recording lasted between four and five 8 hour days, as well as a few short supplementary sessions which he had to attend as a result of technical issues by caused the studio's mixing boxes.

Hanover was unaware at the time of BioShock's development that his character's most famous line, "Would you kindly", was intended to be a plot device or that it is repeatedly used as a tool of manipulation with the player character because Levine never told him of its in-universe significance during their recording work. Hanover noted in an interview that he would have framed it differently if he had the benefit of hindsight, but appreciated that Levine's direction for him to speak that phrase in a consistently nonchalant manner was a "clever" decision creatively. Hanover had an overall positive experience working with Levine and the rest of the BioShock development team, and was excited at the prospect of working on further BioShock projects. Hanover described his return to the role of Atlas/Fontaine in Burial at Sea and the expansion of the character's backstory as "wonderful", and that he had a better idea of how the world and the characters are supposed to look like.

== Appearances ==
=== BioShock ===
In BioShock, Atlas first makes contact with Jack, the sole survivor of a plane crash who discovers a bathysphere terminal in a nearby lighthouse that transports him to Rapture, via radio upon his arrival in Rapture. Atlas guides him to safety and claims that he is motivated to help Jack so that he could reach his wife Moira and son Patrick, who have been hiding out on a submarine in the Neptune's Bounty area, on his behalf. He tells Jack that the only way he can survive is to use the abilities granted by plasmids, and encourages him to kill the Little Sisters to extract their ADAM. Often using the phrase "Would you kindly..." in his messages to Jack, Atlas also regularly provides combat advice against Andrew Ryan's forces, which consist of Rapture's automated security systems and pheromone-controlled Splicers, human residents of Rapture who are physically mutated and mentally crazed as a result of excessive use of ADAM.

As Jack makes his way through the city, he learns about Rapture's history and fate through recovered audio logs, genetically induced ghostly playbacks of past events, and radio messages from Atlas. As a result of Ryan's strict ban of contact with the outside world in order to safeguard the secret of Rapture's existence, a black market in smuggled goods arose, which is dominated by a mobster named Frank Fontaine. Fontaine's wealth, combined with his access to scientific breakthroughs from the Rapture-based scientists Dr. Brigid Tenenbaum and Dr. Yi Suchong, soon gained him enough power and followers to challenge Ryan for control of the city. Following Fontaine's apparent death in late 1958 by Ryan's forces, Atlas emerged and took Fontaine's place as the leader of his opposition. On New Year's Eve that same year, Atlas and his ADAM-augmented followers started a riot. This sparked a civil war between Ryan and Atlas, ostensibly representing a class conflict between the upper and lower classes respectively, that eventually spread to all of Rapture, crippling the city.

When Jack arrives at a submarine which supposedly contains Atlas' family, Ryan has it detonated, which prompts an enraged Atlas to demand Ryan's death as reprisal. Jack eventually reaches Ryan, who reveals that Jack was in fact Ryan's son, born in Rapture only two years prior and was genetically modified by Suchong to mature rapidly. Ryan informs Jack that he was designed to obey orders from Atlas when addressed with a trigger phrase, then sent to the surface after the civil war in Rapture began. Ryan, determined to die on his terms, compels Jack to kill him using the trigger phrase "Would you kindly...".

Atlas, now in control of Rapture, reveals his true identity as Fontaine, who faked his death and disguised himself. With Ryan dead, Fontaine no longer needs Jack, and leaves him at the mercy of the reactivated security systems. Tenenbaum and her Little Sisters intervene and help Jack escape through a ventilation duct. Tenenbaum deactivates some of Jack's mental conditioning and assists him in breaking the remainder, including one activated by Fontaine that would have eventually stopped his heart. During Jack's subsequent pursuit of Fontaine, Tenanbaum instructs Jack to assemble a Big Daddy bodysuit, and follow the rescued Little Sisters through the passageways that only they can open. By the time Jack reaches Fontaine, he has injected himself with vast amounts of ADAM, severely mutating his body. Jack manages to defeat Fontaine, while the Little Sisters swarm and stab him to death with their ADAM needles.

=== BioShock 2 ===
In the 2010 sequel BioShock 2, the player can collect audio diaries left by Atlas/Fontaine. In one recording, Fontaine muses about Sofia Lamb's status in Rapture and her falling out with Andrew Ryan. In another recording, he reflects on his decision to adopt the guise of Atlas. Fontaine's business headquarters, 'Fontaine Futuristics', is also featured as a level in the story.

=== BioShock Infinite: Burial at Sea ===
BioShock Infinite: Burial at Sea, set before the events of the first BioShock, reveals that Fontaine's forces are confined to a building that housed Fontaine's Departmental Stores, which has been forcibly sunk to the bottom of the ocean on Ryan's orders. Having already assumed his Atlas guise by the events of Episode Two, he discovers an unconscious Elizabeth and a Little Sister named Sally following the events of Episode One. Atlas was prepared to order her death, but Elizabeth claims that she is Dr. Suchong's assistant and knows where to find him. Atlas allows Elizabeth to leave on her way, but takes Sally as a hostage. Elizabeth discovers Suchong's secret laboratory where a portal to Columbia can be opened, and makes an offer to Atlas: in exchange for Sally's safe return to her, she would retrieve the same technology that keeps Columbia afloat to lift the Fontaine building off the sea floor.

Although Elizabeth successfully completes the task of returning the building back to Rapture's depth, Atlas reneges on their agreement. He orders his followers to incapacitate her, and starts a civil conflict against Ryan. Desperate to locate Suchong and his "ace in the hole" to be used against Ryan, Atlas interrogates and tortures Elizabeth (via lobotomy) about Suchong's exact whereabouts, but fails to glean any useful information from her on each occasion until he directly threatens Sally. Elizabeth has a momentary vision in response to the stressor, and realizes that Suchong is in his clinic guarded by Ryan's security systems that are keyed to repel Atlas and his men by their DNA. Atlas sends Elizabeth in to retrieve Suchong, only to witness his murder by a rogue Big Daddy. Fearing the "ace in the hole" lost, she finds a piece of paper with a coded message, has another vision, and realizes she has found what Atlas is looking for. She returns the paper to Atlas, and decodes the message for him: "Would you kindly?" Atlas realizes this is the trigger phrase that Suchong has implanted in Jack, the illegitimate son of Ryan that Atlas has sent to the surface. Atlas orders his men to make arrangements for Jack to come to Rapture, and then delivers a fatal blow to Elizabeth, leaving her to spend her final moments with Sally.

== Reception ==
Players who participated in the critical playtest of BioShock reacted negatively towards the original incarnation of Atlas. None of the players indicated that they trusted Atlas as a welcoming party or guide to Rapture; one attendee described the character's voice as a "lecherous Colonel Sanders". The developmental team took the feedback into consideration, which led to the recasting of Atlas as an Irish character. The character's reception improved following the release of BioShock in 2007. Christopher M. Bingham called Atlas one of the most important characters in the history of video games due to the nature of his role as an anthropomorphic metaphor for the matter in which video games speak to its players. Bingham elaborated that Atlas' importance to the video game medium extends beyond the narrative of the game's narrative because of the way he is used to force player agency into focus, which in turn is used to mock the player's efforts. IGN ranked Atlas/Fontaine 58th in their list of "Top 100 Video Game Villains"; they claimed that the character retains an "undercurrent of sympathy" in spite of his heinous actions, "a desperate man in a harsh environment, trying to cope with the suffocating ego of Ryan". Katie Seville from Game Informer considered the voice performance for Atlas/Fontaine to be among the most memorable character voices in video games, highlighting in particular the transformation and transition of an endearing, once-trusted voice into that of a sinister crime lord.

A pivotal cutscene which reveals the character's duplicity and the true nature of his "Would you kindly?" catchphrase became a widely discussed aspect of BioShock in the aftermath of its critical and commercial success. Commenting on the sequence of events that ends in Ryan's death and the revelation of Atlas' identity as Fontaine, Wes Fenlon from PC Gamer thought that it was rare at the time for video games, let alone a shooter game, that would question or comment on its relationship with the player as part of its exploration of objectivism and free will. Mike Diver from Vice considered the scene to be "gaming’s greatest plot twist" with how it subverted expectations of player agency, and observed that the "would you kindly" phrase inspired memes and easter eggs in other video games. David Sims from The Atlantic concurred, calling the revelation of Atlas as the game's true villain to be "brilliant", "the game’s way of ultimately mocking the illusion of choice it supposedly offered". Sims interpreted the plot twist as conveying the essence of the game's goal-oriented design philosophy, and that like many other video games, the purpose of its in-game world is for players to navigate a very specific story toward pre-written endings.

The final boss fight in BioShock is widely regarded as one of the game's weakest aspects. PCGamesN ranked it among the worst boss fights in video games, calling it "a terrifically weak way to end a game that really tries to be more than iron sights pointing at irrelevant cannon fodder", and that the encounter undid much of the tension building and atmosphere that came before. Edwin Evans-Thirlwell from Eurogamer described the boss battle as "absurd", but also argued that the developer's decision to oblige players to participate in a video game climatic device that is often hackneyed and abused suggested that they are "as much a slave to BioShock's self-negating fable" in obliging players to go through the motions when they are fully aware of their nature as mere gestures. Ken Levine (sort of) acknowledged the mixed reception to the boss fight in a Tweet via his Twitter account in September 2018.

== Analysis and themes ==
Atlas's role as Jack's guide and eventual manipulator has been discussed by scholars in relation to BioShock's treatment of player agency. Writing in Games and Culture, Jessica Aldred and Brian Greenspan argued that Atlas's communications are presented through a form of one-way media consumption: although his radio messages appear to offer helpful guidance, Jack and the player cannot reply to or interrupt them. They viewed his instructions as part of the game's wider "control" logic, in which apparent freedom is constrained by the systems through which information and objectives are delivered. The revelation that Jack has been conditioned to obey Atlas consequently reframes the player's earlier compliance with his instructions, according to Aldred and Greenspan, by exposing the apparent choices made during the game as largely illusory.

Adam Ruch similarly interpreted Atlas as both a storytelling device and a means of examining control. Ruch described Atlas as the game's primary guide, whose radio messages provide Jack with both an account of events in Rapture and instructions on how to proceed. His later revelation as Fontaine reverses that relationship: Jack is shown to have been a pawn in Fontaine's conflict with Andrew Ryan, while the player's inability to prevent Jack from killing Ryan implicates the player in the same structure of obedience. Ruch considered the transition from Atlas as guide to Fontaine as enemy part of a broader series of role reversals through which BioShock contrasts choice with control. Collin Pointon likewise argued that BioShock conceals Atlas's identity while encouraging the player to treat his directions as ordinary role-playing-game objectives. For Pointon, the subsequent revelation works simultaneously as a narrative twist and a metanarrative one: the discovery that Jack lacks autonomy also forces players to recognize that refusing Atlas's objectives would have prevented them from progressing through the game.

Other scholars have examined the way Atlas constructs the trust necessary for that manipulation. In Beyond the Sea: Navigating BioShock, Karen Schrier characterized Atlas as an authoritarian parental figure whose voice instructs the inexperienced player where to go, what to do, and how to behave. She argued that he initially appears protective and supportive, but ultimately represents the restrictive side of the game's balance between guidance and autonomy: Jack cannot complete the game without carrying out Atlas's objectives. Jordan R. Youngblood further interpreted Atlas's invented wife and child, Moira and Patrick, as part of this manipulation. Youngblood argued that Fontaine constructs himself through the Atlas persona as a husband and father and uses the fabricated family narrative to give Jack and the player an emotional justification for pursuing and killing Ryan.

Patrick Brown approached the same revelation as a commentary on the player's relationship with the game itself. Brown noted that Jack appears to follow Atlas's radio requests voluntarily for much of BioShock, but that the discovery of his conditioning exposes both the game's linear structure and the player's own willingness to follow Atlas's instructions. He argued that the twist undermines the player's assumed self-sufficiency by drawing attention to the unseen systems that determine which actions are available within the game world.

Ryan Lizardi interpreted the conflict between Fontaine and Andrew Ryan in a broader historical context. He argued that BioShock complicates idealized representations of the United States during the 1950s and 1960s by setting the competing ideologies of Ryan and Fontaine within Rapture's failed utopia. Lizardi characterized Fontaine's nihilism and Ryan's Objectivism as opposing forces through which the game interrogates the political and cultural assumptions associated with the period.
