= Big Daddy (BioShock) =

Fictional character from BioShock

- BioShock character
- A Big Daddy and Little Sister from BioShock
- First game: BioShock (2007)
- Created by: Ken Levine
- Designed by: Scott Sinclair
- Voiced by: Stephen Stanton

In-universe information
- Home: Rapture

A Big Daddy is a fictional character in the BioShock series of video games. Big Daddies are heavily spliced (genetically engineered and altered with ADAM) human beings who have had their bodies directly grafted into heavily armored, steampunk-inspired atmospheric diving suits. They are armed with a rivet gun, heavy drill, rocket launcher, or ion laser. Alpha series Big Daddies are equipped with any of several other weapons as well. Though they make low-pitched groaning noises similar to whales, their vocalizations were performed by voice actor Stephen Stanton. Designed by Irrational Games (then under the supervision of 2K Boston/2K Australia), they first appeared in BioShock and were promoted heavily. A six-inch Big Daddy action figure was included in the limited-edition version of the title. In its sequel, BioShock 2, the player controls a prototype Big Daddy.

They roam the underwater dystopian city of Rapture, mentally conditioned to protect the Little Sisters—little girls who harvest a substance called ADAM from corpses—thanks to a series of plasmids stripping them of their humanity and free will. The player's interactions with Big Daddies and Little Sisters have been described by developer Ken Levine as the cornerstone of the game, due to the player's need for ADAM in order to gain strength in the game.

== Conception and design ==
Several designs were considered for the Big Daddy during development

Conceived of early on as a man encased in a diving suit, the Big Daddy was designed to have "that hulking metal feel of an underwater protector, so solid not even a shotgun blast could knock him off his feet." While the concept remained the same of an AI character that protected the "gatherer" AI characters in the title, many ideas were considered for their mobility and execution, including a wheelchair mounted version. As the designs for the individual types evolved, intricate details of the actual diving suit were worked out piece by piece, using the concept that the suits would be constructed from salvaged parts of the city. Developer Ken Levine noted that with the concept of the gatherers as little girls, it allowed the team to explore the protector role of the character and demonstrate it in a way to appeal to a real-world relationship for the player.

Two versions of the Big Daddy are present in BioShock: the 'Rosie' and the 'Bouncer'. Initial drafts of the Rosie model featured it encased in a light atmospheric diving suit with a singular hole for viewing through the helmet, as well as missing its left forearm and hand, replaced with a hook and pulley supported by cables attached to the stump. Later designs restored the arm, adding a rivet gun, heavy oxygen tanks mounted on both shoulders and a squid-like tentacle extending from each shoulder. The completed design remained similar, removing the tentacles and reducing the oxygen tanks to a singular one positioned on its back, angled towards its right shoulder. The Rosie's rivet gun itself went through progressive design improvements, with the intent of making it "more fleshed out and threatening".

The Bouncer model of Big Daddy featured it encased in a heavier diving suit than the Rosie, with the helmet more heavily armored and having multiple smaller holes for viewing. Several ideas were considered for weaponry, originally consisting of a wrist mounted fan-blade on the right arm and a hand-held double hook in the left hand. These were replaced by hand mounted grinders attached to each arm and an added oxygen tank angled over the left shoulder. The weaponry was changed in the finalized design to a heavy drill over the right hand, with an engine and exhaust for it positioned over the right shoulder.

A third model, dubbed "Slow Pro FUM" by the development team, was excluded from the game. Standing for "slow-moving, projectile-shooting, f'ed-up-melee", this Big Daddy was intended as a slow, ranged type that would center itself and fire a heavy projectile at enemies via a large arm-mounted cannon. Despite being designed for range, the developers noted its melee attacks were intended to be just as powerful. In an interview with GameTrailers' "Bonus Round", BioShock designers Bill Gardner and Hogarth De La Plante highlighted it as an aspect cut from the game late in development, and one they would have most liked to have kept out of all the cut content for the title. BioShock 2 formally introduced the opponent as the "Rumbler", its weaponry altered to include a rocket launcher and the ability to deploy mini-turrets around an area.

In BioShock 2, players are given control of Subject Delta, the first Big Daddy to be successfully paired with a Little Sister. The designs wanted it to have a rough-draft appearance and look like a "work in progress", while incorporating elements of the later models. As a result, several concepts were considered, combining the parts of the Rosie and Bouncer models, before the developers settled on an appearance more akin to the former, but retaining the heavy drill of the latter. In the Protector Trials DLC, the player plays as an unknown Alpha Series Big Daddy and in the Minerva's Den DLC the player plays as Subject Sigma.

== Appearances ==
=== In video games ===
==== BioShock ====
Big Daddies are mentally conditioned armed escorts to the Little Sisters, little girls who gather ADAM from corpses. The girls in turn interact with the Big Daddy, referring to it as "Mr. Bubbles" or "Mr. B" as they talk or sing to it gently, and mourn for them if they die. In order to gain higher level powers, the player must kill the Big Daddy escort and recover the ADAM from the Little Sister.

If the title screen of BioShock is left to idle, the game's initial launch trailer will play, which graphically shows the violent nature of Big Daddies and Rapture itself - a splicer pulls a Little Sister out of an escape vent, and corners her with a wrench, in order to kill her and harvest her ADAM. A Big Daddy saves her by intervening, which follows a close-quarters melee, in which the splicer has his hand drilled through when he raises it to defend himself - he then injects himself with the Insect Swarm plasmid and attacks the Big Daddy with a swarm of red hornets. The splicer then rams a shotgun directly into one of the Big Daddy's helmet viewports and fires, sending it off a balcony, where it lies immobile on the floor below. As he looks down, a drill is rammed through his back and appears from his stomach, directly in his line of sight. The second Big Daddy then engages the drill, causing the splicer to scream in agony. The Big Daddy then removes the drill, spins the splicer round to face it and punches him in the face with the drill. The scene cuts to black, and then cuts back to the little sister crying on the floor, until the Big Daddy walks up to her. With blood dripping off its drill onto the floor, it holds out an enormous hand, which is taken by the tiny hand of the Little Sister, and the sequence ends.

Outside of protecting Little Sisters they rarely interact with anything else. They are incapable of speech and can only communicate via groans and grunts and roars. If a Big Daddy comes across the player character or a splicer it will not attack unprovoked. However, if either the player or a splicer gets too close to a Little Sister, the Big Daddy will assume an aggressive stance in attempt to scare off the transgressor. If either the Big Daddy or the Little Sister is attacked (intentionally or accidentally), the Big Daddy will retaliate against the attacker until it or the attacker is dead. A 'Hypnotize Big Daddy' plasmid can be obtained to hypnotize Big Daddies into protecting the player, but the Little Sister will be abandoned, so the player loses the chance to obtain ADAM. The lights on the helmet indicate their moods: Yellow indicates that the Big Daddy is indifferent to the player's presence, red indicates rage towards the player, and green indicates that the Big Daddy is hypnotized and friendly towards the player. Big Daddies can also get into fights with other Big Daddies, but this is a rare occurrence.

==== BioShock 2 ====
In BioShock 2, the player takes on the role of Subject Delta, previously known as "Johnny Topside", who is an early Big Daddy prototype known as the Alpha Series that had his mind and free will restored by Tenenbaum. He is the first Big Daddy to be successfully "pair-bonded" with a single Little Sister. The Alpha Series are a streamlined and agile type of Big Daddy - they are not as heavily armored, but are faster and more maneuverable: they bear a resemblance to the Rosie model, with minor alterations and additional features, such as a differently-shaped helmet with a solitary viewport, a diving knife worn on the hip (never used in-game), and the ability to mount a Bouncer drill. Alpha Series were not grafted into their suits like the later production models, but are still heavily spliced, being able to use Plasmids. However, the Alpha Series suffer from a major flaw: If the Little Sister they are pair-bonded to dies, is rescued, or is simply too far from them, then the Alpha will eventually fall into either a coma or a berserk rage - subsequent Big Daddy generations removed the specific pair-bonding in favor of Big Daddies protecting any Little Sister in general. Unlike in the previous game, Little Sisters will not run away from the player when they meet, but instead greet them, able to be "Adopted" to collect ADAM or "Harvested" on the spot to collect greater amounts of ADAM at the cost of their lives.

In the downloadable content for BioShock 2 called Minerva's Den, the player takes on the role of Subject Sigma, previously known as Charles Milton Porter, on a mission to recover the Thinker from Reed Wahl, Porter's former partner that betrayed him to Andrew Ryan and leading to his transformation into Subject Sigma. The Thinker uses Porter's likeness to guide the way for Sigma, and at the end of the storyline, Sigma is returned to his original form as Porter. A new type of Big Daddy called the "Lancer" is introduced in Minerva's Den as opponents for Sigma. It is equipped with a beam weapon called the Ion Laser, and can also send out a flash that blinds the player.

Big Daddy, specifically the Bouncer type once again, appears in BioShock Infinite and its downloadable content, Burial at Sea. The Bouncer in Burial at Sea is slightly different in that it has a launchable drill arm in which the Bouncer can "fire" the drill out to a short distance away. It is later revealed why this feature was not included in BioShock's Bouncers as the launchable drill head is unreliable and liable to break away completely when fired, Dr. Yi Suchong recommended a fixed drill with the Bouncer able to simply rush the player as a compensation.

=== In other media ===
A Bouncer-type Big Daddy appears as a playable third-party character in PlayStation All-Stars Battle Royale.

== Promotion and merchandise ==
To promote BioShock, 2K Games released a six inch tall immobile Big Daddy figurine packaged with the limited-edition release of the game. However, many of the figures arrived broken, resulting in 2K Games announcing in November 2007 that replacement figurines would be distributed, accompanied with a printed artbook for the title.

== Reception ==
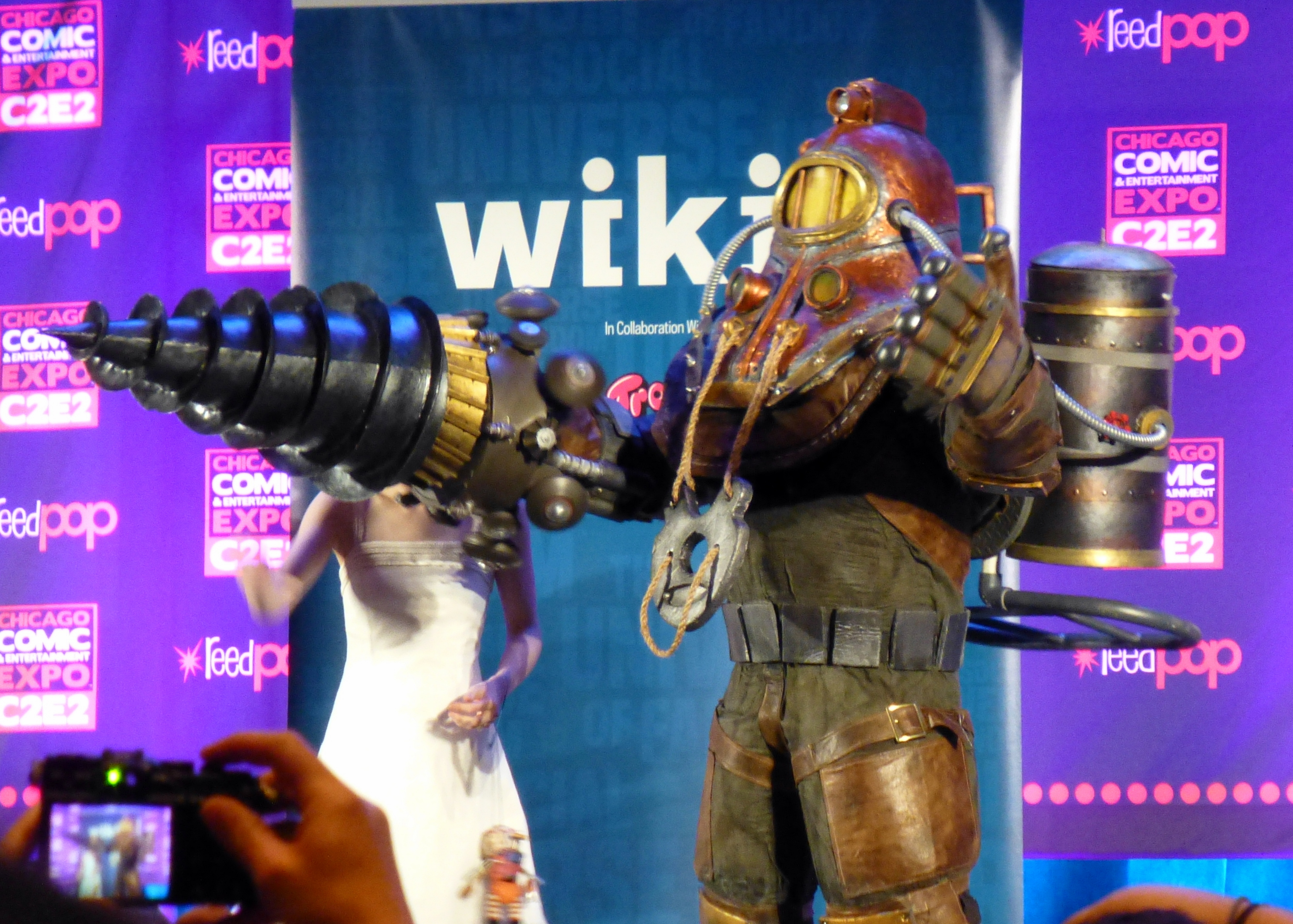
A cosplayer portraying Subject Delta, the player character of BioShock 2.

The Pittsburgh Tribune-Review described the Big Daddy as "a freight train of a man-turned-monster", noting the moral dilemma of attempting to fight it or not. PC Gamer called them "bizarre and compelling to watch" and added "I've never seen anything in a game look so angry as a Big Daddy when provoked." 1UP.com called it "the soul of BioShock" and its "moral centerpiece", adding "He doesn't choose to fight you; you have to make the decision to terminate him...You may fear him, but you have no reason to hate the Big Daddy. When he's defending a Sister from a pack of splicers, it's hard not to root for his rivet gun. And when he bends to one knee to allow her to retreat to the safety of her hiding hole in the wall, it's a legitimately touching moment."

IGN described the Big Daddy as one of their favorite video game monsters of all time, and in another article stated "Few enemies inspire such a combination of wonderment and sheer terror in gamers as the colossal Big Daddy". In an article discussing the character in terms of a BioShock film, editors Phil Pirrello and Christopher Monfette attributed IGN's high review score for the game to the character, and stated "No character so fresh out of the gate claimed iconic status as quickly as BioShock's baddie did...Our hero is only as good as our villain. Lucky for the filmmakers, they have themselves a potentially great one in Big Daddy." Despite their praise, in a later article they were ranked by readers as the eighth most overrated video game characters, which IGN attributed to their feeling that as the game progressed the Big Daddy became less an imposing threat, and the ability to disguise oneself as a Big Daddy at the end of BioShock removed the "scary image" the character held for players.

In 2007, IGN featured the character in their "Badasssss!" awards, in which he took third place, directly below Master Chief and Samus Aran. X-Play placed it at number three on their "Top 10 Greatest Videogame Monsters of All Time" list, describing it as "Blending lightning quickness and murderous tenacity, in an outfit that implies a tortured dive to Hell." GameDaily listed the character as one of their "Top 25" scariest monsters in video gaming, placing it at number three on their list. Later articles named his role as the protector of the Little Sisters as one of the greatest duos in video games, and additionally ranked the Big Daddy as the best non-boss enemy in a video game, stating "He's one bad mother that we wouldn't want to run into in an underwater city, or anywhere, for that matter." GamesRadar listed him as one of the top 25 best new characters of the decade, describing him as "scary and sad", "overwhelmingly alien and yet disturbingly human", and "brutally vicious to strangers while lovingly gentle to Little Sisters". In 2016, Glixel staff ranked the Big Daddy the 8th most iconic video game character of the 21st century.
