= BioShock 2 =

2010 video game

- Developer: 2K Marin (Note: Co-developed by 2K Australia, Additional work and development support by Arkane Studios, and 2K China. Digital Extremes co-developed the multiplayer mode)
- Publisher: 2K
- Director: Jordan Thomas
- Composer: Garry Schyman
- Series: BioShock
- Engine: Unreal Engine 2.5
- Platforms: PlayStation 3; Windows; Xbox 360; Mac OS X
- Release: PS3, Windows, Xbox 360; February 9, 2010; Mac OS X; March 29, 2012
- Genre: First-person shooter
- Modes: Single-player, multiplayer

BioShock 2 is a first-person shooter video game developed by 2K Marin and published by 2K Games. It was released worldwide for PlayStation 3, Windows, and Xbox 360 on February 9, 2010; Feral Interactive released an OS X version on March 30, 2012. The game takes place in the dystopian underwater city of Rapture, eight years after the events of BioShock. In the single-player campaign, players control the armored protagonist Subject Delta as he fights through Splicers—the psychotic human population of the city—using weapons and an array of genetic modifications. The game includes a story-driven multiplayer mode that takes place before the events of BioShock, during Rapture's civil war.

After the success of BioShock, 2K Games formed a new studio, 2K Marin, to create the sequel. co-developed by 2K Australia, while Arkane Studios, and 2K China provided additional work and development support and Digital Extremes helped co-developed the multiplayer mode. The developers focused on improving gameplay elements from the first game, and return to the Rapture setting to explore a new perspective of the city. The story received major changes throughout development. Garry Schyman, who composed BioShock's soundtrack, returned for the sequel; he expanded the game's sonic palette to include more blues and religious music to parallel its themes.

BioShock 2 received positive reviews, with praise directed at its narrative, themes, art style, characters, endings and gameplay. Criticisms included a slow start and failure to distinguish itself from its predecessor. Retrospective reviews have been more positive, with some considering it the best in the series. The multiplayer mode was supported with downloadable content, and a single-player campaign expansion, Minerva's Den, released in August 2010. The game sold more than 3 million copies, but did not meet the publisher's sales expectations. A remastered version titled BioShock 2 Remastered was released as part of BioShock: The Collection for PlayStation 4, Windows, Xbox One, and Nintendo Switch.

== Synopsis ==
=== Setting ===
BioShock 2 takes place in the city of Rapture, an underwater metropolis hidden from the world. Rapture was founded in the 1940s by billionaire Andrew Ryan to establish a city free from religious influences and government regulation. The city's citizens began "splicing"—genetically modifying themselves using ADAM, a substance derived from sea slugs. ADAM was used to create "plasmids" that enable superpowers, such as the ability to create lightning or control fire. Class conflict and civil war were exacerbated by the side effects of ADAM abuse. Modified and conditioned children, called "Little Sisters", collected scarce ADAM from corpses and recycled it under the protection of armed and armored "Big Daddies". Rapture descended into civil war and became a crumbling dystopia populated by Splicers, the spliced remains of the citizenry. In the aftermath of Ryan's death during the first BioShock, the dissident collectivist Sofia Lamb and her followers, known as "the Rapture Family", assume control of the city.

=== Plot ===
BioShock 2 begins on New Year's Eve, 1958. Subject Delta, a Big Daddy, patrols Rapture with his Little Sister Eleanor. Sofia Lamb, Eleanor's mother, separates the pair and forces Delta to kill himself. Delta awakens in 1968, resurrected by a Little Sister under Eleanor's direction. Delta is informed by Brigid Tenenbaum, the custodian of the rehabilitated Little Sisters, that because he has a physiological bond with Eleanor, he will die unless he finds her. Helped by Tenenbaum's ally Augustus Sinclair, Delta makes his way to Eleanor, who is trapped in Sofia Lamb's stronghold. Lamb plans to use ADAM to transfer the minds and memories of all of Rapture's inhabitants into Eleanor, to create a selfless leader. Traveling through the city, Delta encounters members of Lamb's Rapture Family and can choose whether to kill or spare them.

Delta arrives at the containment chamber where Eleanor is held, but Lamb captures him and severs his bond to Eleanor by temporarily stopping Eleanor's heart. Delta begins to weaken as the bond cannot be re-established. Eleanor transforms herself into a Big Sister to free Delta. Together they head for an escape pod Sinclair prepared to escape the city. They find that Lamb has converted Sinclair into a Big Daddy and are forced to kill him. Eleanor and Delta make it to the escape pod, but Delta is mortally wounded by a trap set by Lamb.

The ending is influenced by how the player interacted with Little Sisters and the fates of the Rapture Family's members. Eleanor can either save her mother or leave her to drown. Delta succumbs to his wounds; Eleanor either absorbs his ADAM, personality and memories and leaves Rapture with the Little Sisters to better the world at large, or forcibly extracts Delta's ADAM and becomes bent on world domination.

== Gameplay ==
BioShock 2 is a first-person shooter. The player assumes the character of silent protagonist Subject Delta eight years after the events of BioShock. The player explores Rapture and fights off Splicers using weapons, environmental hazards, and plasmids. Plasmids grant powers such as telekinesis and must be recharged with "EVE" before further use. The player can equip tonics—passive bonuses varying from increased speed to reduced EVE usage. Several weapons in BioShock 2 are unique to the Big Daddy, including a powerful drill and a rivet gun. The player can use each weapon in a close-range melee attack, and may simultaneously equip a weapon and a plasmid. If the player is killed, they are revived via a Vita-Chamber.

Players scavenge ammunition and supplies as they explore Rapture, and may purchase items at vending machines scattered throughout the city. Weapons can be loaded with various types of ammunition for greater effectiveness against certain types of foes. They can be upgraded at certain machines; three cumulative upgrades enable a special weapon effect—for example, the modified rivet gun shoots super-heated projectiles that ignite enemies.

Players can use the environment, as well as weapons, to defeat enemies; here, the player uses the Electro Bolt plasmid to shock a pool of water, electrocuting a Splicer enemy standing in it.

Some game mechanics were streamlined from BioShock, such as hacking into security systems and turrets. This is represented by a lengthy Pipe Mania–style minigame in BioShock, but a shorter timing puzzle in BioShock 2. The player stops a needle on a colored gauge; stopping on the gauge's green area completes the hack, and hitting small blue areas gives a bonus. If the needle lands on the white or red portions, the hack fails and damages the player or triggers an alarm. The research camera mechanic was altered, recording video instead of stills. Using it while damaging enemies in creative ways gives players bonuses or new abilities.

ADAM is used to upgrade the player's plasmids and tonics. Upgraded plasmids bestow additional abilities for more tactical usage; for example, an upgraded Electro Bolt plasmid inflicts chains of electric damage between enemies, rather than affecting only a single target. As a Big Daddy, the player can defeat other Big Daddies and either adopt their Little Sisters—having them gather ADAM for the player—or harvest the Sisters for their ADAM outright. After adopting a Little Sister, the player escorts her to corpses littered around Rapture and must protect her while she harvests more ADAM. Once the Little Sister has collected enough ADAM, the player can choose to either harvest or save her. Harvesting or saving Little Sisters will provoke attacks from Big Sisters. ADAM can also be collected from slugs when venturing into the open ocean surrounding Rapture.

=== Multiplayer ===
BioShock 2 features a story-driven multiplayer mode called Fall of Rapture, in which the player plays one of Rapture's citizens during the 1959–1960 civil war. Plasmid manufacturer Sinclair Solutions asks the citizen to test out their weapons and plasmids as part of a rewards program. The mode shares many of BioShock's weapons and plasmids, alongside new ones such as a chain gun and the Aero Dash plasmid. Players customize their character and equipped weapons and plasmids from their apartment, which serves as an optional visual representation of the game's menus.

Multiplayer features seven different game modes. These include the deathmatch modes "Survival of the Fittest" and "Civil War"; "Capture the Sister", a capture the flag mode in which the objective to capture or defend is a Little Sister; and "Turf War", in which teams compete to control specific areas of a map. Maps are based on locations from BioShock. As the player progresses, new weapons, tonics, and plasmids are unlocked, and story-related audio diaries become available in the player's apartment.

== Development ==
2K Boston and Irrational Games's BioShock was released to critical acclaim and strong sales. Publisher 2K executive Christoph Hartmann envisioned BioShock as the first entry in a franchise, and the publisher approached 2K Boston about whether they wanted to produce a BioShock sequel in the fall of 2007. Levine and 2K Boston decided to pass on the project. Instead, several ex-BioShock developers formed a new studio based in Novato, California in late 2007, called 2K Marin. 2K Marin began work on BioShock 2 with a core team of eight in November 2007, with 78 additional personnel at the peak of development. The developers were given three mandates: that the game would ship for PlayStation 3 (the previous game was Xbox 360-exclusive at launch), that it would feature a multiplayer mode, and that it would be delivered within two and a half years. It was developed in five countries across five time zones. 2K Marin was assisted by 2K Australia, 2K China, Arkane Studios, and Digital Extremes, who was responsible for the multiplayer component.

Jordan Thomas was in BioShock's "design pit" at 2K Boston and made its "Fort Frolic" level. He worked alongside Alyssa Finley, who became executive producer at 2K Marin and subsequently hired him as BioShock 2's creative director. Thomas said that the first concern with a sequel was, "where do you go with this? How do you bring people back to an experience and terrify them and shock them in a way that they're not expecting, but also fulfill the many expectations they're projecting onto it?" Early on, Thomas decided on the inclusion of the city of Rapture, which could harbor many previously unseen locations and untold stories. The developers wanted to balance surprising old players with introducing the setting to newcomers. Thomas and environmental artist Hogarth De La Plante agreed that the setting of Rapture was fertile for new ideas and that, as veterans of BioShock, they were excited to add never-before-seen parts of the city and continue their art style. "Any idea was out on the table at that point, and I think nobody has played BioShock more than the developers that made it, so I feel like in one respect we are a pretty good litmus test for whether it's still an interesting place or not," La Plante recalled. "And if that doesn't bore us and we're the people that played it for thousands upon thousands of hours, then I think we have a pretty good perspective on how interesting that location really is." The developers decided to make the player a Big Daddy to make BioShock 2's story to be one of an insider, rather than that of a stranger stumbling across Rapture as in BioShock.

=== Game design ===
BioShock 2's developers aimed to improve less-positively received aspects of BioShock. One such element was the hacking minigame; Thomas said that even players who initially enjoyed it eventually found it repetitive. Its replacement, which does not allow pausing, added urgency to the gameplay. Another improvement was the choice to harvest or save Little Sisters; by allowing players to adopt them, Thomas hoped it would help players bond with them and make the choice more thought-provoking. The developers added more unspliced characters and offered players more decisions that impact the game's course, with the goal of a more dynamic story and ending. Each game level was devised by an environmental artist and level designer working collaboratively, rather than being designed and then handed to art teams to be detailed. Level designer Steve Gaynor recalled that close collaboration helped gameplay spaces—and thus the world as a whole—feel functional and real. A major goal was to maintain significant player freedom in gameplay. The team used a modified version of the Unreal Engine 2.5 game engine, which was familiar and quickened development, but outdated (even at the time of the original BioShock's development) and presented unique challenges; for example, the user interface had to be built using an unsupported Adobe Flash library.

With a limited development window, Digital Extremes pushed back on some of the more expansive ideas for the multiplayer, including a persistent massively multiplayer format, in favor of a more standard, match-based player-versus-player offering. Initially, multiplayer gameplay rules evolved throughout a match's duration and had no team-based component, but players found the rule changing confusing and features like character customization to be more enjoyable when playing with a team. The developers limited the amount of weapons and plasmids players could simultaneously use to match the faster pace of tight multiplayer environments.

=== Story and theme ===
The story changed heavily throughout development. BioShock 2 was initially intended to be a prequel-sequel hybrid to BioShock, with playable flashbacks showing Rapture in its prime. Thomas described the flashback implementation negatively: "What Rapture was like in its heyday appeals on paper, but it meant you really couldn't play the game. Players sleepwalked through each scene, which was pretty, but not particularly convincing." There was to be only one Big Sister character, namely Eleanor, intended to be one of the Little Sisters saved at the end of BioShock. Unable to acclimatize to life on land, she returns to Rapture, becomes the Big Sister, and kidnaps children from the surface in an effort to resurrect Rapture. In game, the Big Sister would continually hunt the player and could not be defeated; this was changed to give the player a sense of triumph in fighting the Big Sisters. This version of the Big Sister presented story problems; Thomas recalled that the Big Sister's reveal as Eleanor inadvertently felt like a twist, and she had done so much evil that she was unredeemable.

In contrast to the first BioShock's focus on libertarianism and Ayn Rand's philosophies, BioShock 2 focuses on collectivist ideals. Lamb's philosophy of altruism recalls that of Karl Marx and John Stuart Mill. "Her motto is 'Make the world your family', meaning force your mind into becoming loyal to the world in a way usually reserved for your child, and that's intellectually daunting," said Thomas. Unlike the first game's questions of free will and destiny, Thomas said that the player character is "almost the ultimate individual" whom Lamb goads to fulfill her goals. Professor Ryan Lizardi draws parallels between BioShock 2's themes of community versus the individual, the extremes of Ryan and Lamb's philosophies, and the issues of McCarthyism and the hippie movement that occurred in the mid-20th century: "BioShock 2 specifically asks players to question all sides of debates when extreme stances are taken." BioShock 2 also deals with cults of personality, technocracy, moral absolutism, fatherhood, class war, equalitarianism, parenthood, childhood, and family.

=== Art ===
Character modeler Brendan George recalled their need to be careful when adapting concept art to avoid animation issues and the uncanny valley. Concept artist Colin Fix said that character costumes would need regular adjustment as teams researched era-appropriate influences; "[the artists] had an earlier version of [a character] with a swanky Hawaiian shirt that was in the time period, but felt out of place in Rapture. It felt really modern even though it wasn't."

Fix described the Splicers as the distorted forms of originally-idealized J. C. Leyendecker and Norman Rockwell figures. Starting with the recognizably human silhouettes of the Splicers established in BioShock, the artists further varied the characters' forms. Early concepts had Splicers with translucent, bioluminescent skin covered in parasites or air sacs. Finding these "human blobs" did not instill sadness in the player, the artists returned to more conventional forms. Digital Extremes developed more than 26 character concepts for the multiplayer mode, eventually narrowed down to a few archetypes representing a cross-section of the Rapture population.

According to animation supervisor Jeff Weir, the Big Sister was Jordan Thomas's first talking point with animators upon their arrival at 2K Marin. The character challenged the team to convey her backstory and personality through design cues rather than plot exposition. "[We thought] of her as graceful and yet awkward at the same time, and that's really the hard challenge that we had with her." Motion capture sessions inspired the alternately awkward and fluid motion of the character. While taking significant influence from the Big Daddies' design, the Big Sister was designed to look unique. Soft design elements influenced by the story—such as Little Sisters that ride around in the Big Sister's cage and draw on her armor—were added to complement the harsh metal of the rest of the character.

=== Audio ===
Michael Kamper served as BioShock 2's audio lead; he joined 2K Marin after the closure of Electronic Arts Chicago. Kamper called it "intimidating" to follow up on the sound design from BioShock as everyone involved was a big fan of the game. While Kamper collaborated with the leads for other facets of the game, he was given wide latitude to develop its sonic style. Kamper, in turn, let his team use whatever audio software they desired, not wanting to limit their creativity.

The setting of BioShock 2 ten years after the first game established the sonic atmosphere. "I really wanted the ambience to sell the fact that Rapture was constantly falling apart around the player", Kamper recalled. Creaking and groaning sounds accentuated the setting's disrepair. To convey the Splicers' mounting insanity, Kamper and the audio team added non-diegetic sounds (audio not coming from the game environment) that become more frequent near the end. The Big Sister's sounds are derived from birds, hyenas, and Kamper's wife doing impressions of a dolphin. The team added elements immersing the player in their role, ranging from heavy footsteps to impacts and water drips on the player's armor. Audio programmer Guy Somberg created a background sound system that allowed layering sounds depending on the player's location, creating organic and random ambient soundscapes. Multiplayer sounds were handled by Digital Extremes, who, along with Kamper's team had to make sure their sounds cohered not only with each other's work, but with the sounds of BioShock.

Garry Schyman reprised his role as BioShock 2's composer. He wrote that scoring the followup to a hit game was a challenge, and BioShock soundtrack's praise set a high bar. He retained some elements and motifs from the first game—solo violin, and mid-20th century compositional techniques—while branching off in new directions. Despite facing high expectations, Schyman noted having played BioShock and using an established style made composition easier. As an improvement from BioShock, more audio cues for each level's combat sequences were added.

Once the game's ambience was established, Schyman responded to specific requests from the audio director for individual pieces. Kamper said that "[Schyman] really, really did a wonderful job" molding the music to fit Thomas' intended mood and tones. The results, such as the level music for "Pauper's Drop", were markedly different from the original BioShock. Kamper sent Schyman video footage and rough drafts of tracks for feedback on their congruity. Kamper split some of Schyman's tracks to use as leitmotifs; the opening track, for a scene with Eleanor and Delta together, was later divided, using the cello for Delta and the violin for Eleanor. The score was recorded by a 60-piece ensemble of the Hollywood Studio Symphony at Capitol Studios.

BioShock 2 makes extensive use of licensed music from the time period. "Similar to the first game, we tried really hard to instill a sense of thematic cogency with our picks that the message that is coming through the licensed tracks," Thomas said, adding that blues and religious music were important to BioShock 2's themes, and that, while the first game had used more commercial pop music, they wanted a more eclectic mix. Music from BioShock was used in the multiplayer portion of BioShock 2 to help connect it back to the time period of the first game.

== Release ==
BioShock 2 was revealed through a teaser trailer hidden in the PlayStation 3 version of BioShock in October 2008. The teaser was subtitled Sea Of Dreams, a name that was ultimately dropped. Its release was preceded by an alternate reality game, "There's Something in the Sea". Over the course of a year, players were directed to a website that detailed the story of a father, Mark Meltzer, searching for his abducted daughter and ultimately discovering Rapture. Players writing to "Meltzer" received cryptic audio recordings, and artifacts purporting to be from Rapture washed up on beaches around the world.

BioShock 2 was released on PlayStation 3, Windows, and Xbox 360 on February 9, 2010. A special edition, limited to a single production run, contains the game along with three posters featuring fictional advertisements from Rapture that reveal hidden messages under a black light, the orchestral score on CD, the orchestral score from BioShock on vinyl, and a hardbound, 164-page art book. It is packaged in a case with special art on the slipcase and box cover. A smaller limited edition, BioShock 2 Rapture Edition, was announced on December 2, 2009. Its contains the game and a smaller, 96-page art book. The Rapture Edition was also limited to a single production run. The launch was preceded by midnight events across the world, including a gala in San Francisco attended by developers.

BioShock 2 was later bundled with BioShock as part of BioShock: Ultimate Rapture Edition.

=== Downloadable content ===
BioShock 2 was supported post-launch with patches and downloadable content (DLC). The first DLC, the Sinclair Solutions Test Pack, was released March 11, 2010. It added player characters, cosmetics, and a multiplayer level increase. The Rapture Metro Pack was released May 11, adding achievements and six maps. Released alongside the Rapture Metro Pack were characters and a game mode, "Kill 'Em' Kindly". The Protector Trials Pack added a single-player challenge mode in which the player defends Little Sisters against swarms of enemies in various challenge rooms. The content contains six maps based on locations from the main game with three levels of difficulty, seven achievements, and unlockable concept art and videos. It was released on consoles in August 2010 and on the PC in March 2011.

The final BioShock 2 DLC, released August 31, 2010, was Minerva's Den, a single-player campaign separate in plot from the main campaign. The player assumes the role of Subject Sigma — another Alpha Series Big Daddy — as he travels through Minerva's Den, home to Rapture's central computer. The campaign adds three levels and develops the lore of Rapture's inner workings. The add-on features weapons, a plasmid, and enemy types. The DLC was released for Windows on May 31, 2011.

The Windows version was patched in October 2013 to replace Games for Windows – Live with Steamworks support for matchmaking. Minerva's Den was released for free for players who owned BioShock 2 before the patch.

=== Remastered version ===
A remastered version was released as part of BioShock: The Collection for PlayStation 4, Windows, and Xbox One in September 2016, as well as a standalone update for existing owners on Windows. The standalone version of BioShock 2 Remastered as well as The Collection was released for the Nintendo Switch on May 29, 2020.

== Reception ==
=== Critical reception ===
Reception

Aggregate score
Aggregator	Score
Metacritic	88/100

Review scores
Publication	Score
1Up.com	B+
Computer and Video Games	9.1/10
Edge	8/10
Eurogamer	8/10
Game Informer	8.25/10
GamePro	5/5
GameSpot	8.5/10
GameSpy	4/5
GamesRadar+	10/10
IGN	9.1/10
Official Xbox Magazine (UK)	9/10

BioShock 2 received positive reviews. Review aggregator Metacritic assigned the game a weighted average critic score of 88/100 across all platforms. Reviewers noted BioShock 2's fundamental similarity to its predecessor, but disagreed on whether the similarity was a problem. GamesRadar's Charlie Barratt wrote that it broke new ground while honoring the original's successes. PC World's Will Herring considered BioShock 2 to have surpassed the original. In contrast, critics such as The A.V. Club's John Teti, The New York Times' Seth Schiesel, and GameSpy's Anthony Gallegos, felt that it failed by hewing so closely to the original, or else failed to meaningfully expand it.

Critics often highlighted the gameplay changes as improvements. Gallegos found that dual-wielding plasmids and weapons made combat less clumsy; reviewers for GamePro and Computer and Video Games highlighted the new enemies as particularly well executed. Edge appreciated the gameplay improvements, but felt that rough edges from BioShock remained, such as annoying, unengaging Splicer fights, and unsatisfying weapon handling. Likewise, Team Xbox considered scavenging for supplies to be tedious and called for various quality-of-life improvements. 1UP.com's Justin Haywald and others were frustrated by the repeated Little Sister protection sequences.

The campaign was generally well received, though not as warmly as BioShock's. Computer and Video Games's Andy Robinson wrote that the game drew from the best of the original BioShock's levels by interspersing narrative in a satisfactory fashion. Criticism included a slow start to the story and excessive similarity with the original—Haywald wrote that the plasmid progression, and even the player character's feel, was too close to BioShock. "It's hard to feel like you haven't done it all before," he said, adding that the story seemingly existed to serve game mechanics, rather than the other way around. Entertainment Weekly's Adam B. Vary felt that the refinements to the morality systems were BioShock 2's biggest improvement; "BioShock 2 is peppered with live-or-die moral quandaries that affect the game throughout."

The multiplayer mode had a mixed reception. It was favored by Haywald and GamePro's Will Herring, who opined that it worked better than it should have on paper. Gallegos and Chad Sapieha of The Globe and Mail found the mode unnecessary; they predicted that few would specifically buy the game for multiplayer, or play more than a few games before returning to another shooter, while GameSpot's Lark Anderson insisted the multiplayer mode would greatly add to the game's longevity. Destructoid's reviewer considered the mode to be undifferentiated from other shooters, and based on luck rather than strategy.

Retrospectives have reconsidered BioShock 2 in its series and among video games as a whole. Game Developer and Kotaku considered BioShock 2 the forerunner of the walking simulator genre of story-focused games. Eurogamer wrote that, whereas BioShock was a story about a city, BioShock 2 was a story about the people within that city—its focus on character offering more emotional moments and making it the "human heart" of the series. Critics who appreciated the game's improved gameplay and focus on emotional beats considered it an under-appreciated sequel. GamesRadar and Vice went further and called it the best game of the series.

BioShock creator Ken Levine, who did not work on the sequel, praised the BioShock 2 team and said they did a good job of "completing the story of Rapture."

=== Sales ===
In its first week of release, BioShock 2 was the best-selling Xbox 360 game in the UK and North America. In the U.S., NPD recorded it as the top selling game of February, with 562,900 units sold on the Xbox 360 and 190,500 on the PlayStation 3. Gamasutra stated a possible reason for the Xbox 360's greater sales was the original BioShock's 14-month exclusivity on that platform. BioShock 2 held the first and second positions on the Steam release charts. In its first month, BioShock 2 was number 1 in sales for the Xbox 360 and number 12 for the PlayStation 3. By March 2010, BioShock 2 sold 3 million copies across all platforms, close to the original BioShock's 4 million lifetime sales at the time. Take-Two Interactive's chief financial officer noted sales slowed faster than expected; prior to release, Take-Two chairman Strauss Zelnick said he expected 5 million copies sold.

== See also ==
- List of underwater science fiction works
