= BioShock =

2007 video game

- Developers: 2K Boston; 2K Australia (Note: Ported to PlayStation 3 by 2K Boston, 2K Australia, 2K Marin, and Digital Extremes; to Mac OS X by Feral Interactive; and to iOS by 2K China.)
- Publisher: 2K
- Directors: Ken Levine; Alyssa Finley
- Composer: Garry Schyman
- Series: BioShock
- Engine: Unreal Engine 2.5
- Platforms: Windows; Xbox 360; PlayStation 3; Mac OS X; iOS
- Release: August 21, 2007: Windows, Xbox 360; NA: August 21, 2007; PAL: August 24, 2007 PlayStation 3; WW: October 17, 2008; NA: October 21, 2008 Mac OS X; WW: October 7, 2009 iOS; WW: August 27, 2014
- Genre: First-person shooter
- Mode: Single-player

BioShock is a 2007 first-person shooter video game developed by 2K Boston (later Irrational Games) and 2K Australia, and published by 2K. The first game in the BioShock series, it was released for Microsoft Windows and Xbox 360 platforms in August 2007; a PlayStation 3 port by Irrational, 2K Marin, 2K Australia and Digital Extremes was released in October 2008. The game follows player character Jack, who discovers the underwater city of Rapture, built by business magnate Andrew Ryan to be an isolated utopia. The discovery of ADAM, a genetic material which grants superhuman powers, initiated the city's turbulent decline. Jack attempts to escape Rapture, fighting its mutated and mechanical denizens, while engaging with the few sane survivors left and learning of the city's past. The player can defeat foes in several ways by using weapons, utilizing plasmids that give unique powers, and by turning Rapture's defenses against them through hacking.

BioShock's concept was developed by Irrational's creative lead, Ken Levine, and incorporates ideas by 20th century dystopian and utopian thinkers such as Ayn Rand, George Orwell, and Aldous Huxley, as well as historical figures such as John D. Rockefeller Jr. and Walt Disney. The game includes role-playing elements, giving the player different approaches in engaging enemies such as by stealth, as well as moral choices of saving or killing characters. Additionally, the game borrows concepts from the survival horror genre, notably the Resident Evil series. BioShock is considered a spiritual successor to the System Shock series, on which many of Irrational's team, including Levine, had worked previously.

BioShock received universal acclaim and was particularly praised by critics for its narrative, themes, visual design, setting, and gameplay. It is considered to be one of the greatest video games ever made and a demonstration of video games as an art form. BioShock was followed by two sequels, BioShock 2 and BioShock Infinite, released in 2010 and 2013, respectively. Ports of BioShock were released for macOS and mobile following its console releases. A remastered version of the game was released on Microsoft Windows, PlayStation 4, Xbox One, and Nintendo Switch as part of BioShock: The Collection.

== Synopsis ==
=== Setting ===
BioShock takes place in Rapture, an underwater city built in the 1940s by business magnate Andrew Ryan, who wanted to create a utopia for society's elite to flourish outside of government control. To protect and isolate Rapture, Ryan bans contact with the surface world. As Rapture flourished, wealth disparities grew, and con man Frank Fontaine used his influence over the disenfranchised working class to establish illegal enterprises and obtain power—enough to rival Ryan. With doctors Brigid Tenenbaum and Yi Suchong, Fontaine created his own company dedicated to researching plasmids and gene tonics. The scientists discovered that sea slugs could produce a substance called ADAM that grants superhuman powers by rewriting a person's DNA. As ADAM became addictive and demand skyrocketed, Fontaine secretly mass-produced ADAM through slugs implanted in the stomachs of orphaned girls, nicknamed "Little Sisters". Fontaine was killed in a shootout with police, and Ryan took the opportunity to seize his assets, including control of the Little Sisters.

In the months that followed, a man amongst the poor named Atlas rose up and began a violent revolution against Ryan, with both sides using plasmid-enhanced humans (known as "Splicers") to wage war on one another. To protect the Little Sisters, Ryan created the "Big Daddies": genetically enhanced humans surgically grafted into gigantic lumbering diving suits designed to escort the sisters as they scavenged ADAM from dead bodies. Tensions came to a head on New Year's Eve of 1958 when Atlas ordered an all-out assault on Ryan and his supporters. The conflict turns Rapture into a war-torn dystopia, resulting in societal collapse, countless deaths, many Splicers becoming disfigured and insane from ADAM abuse, and the few sane survivors barricading themselves away from the chaos.

=== Plot ===
In 1960, the protagonist, Jack, is a passenger on a plane that crashes in the Atlantic Ocean. The only survivor, Jack makes his way to a nearby lighthouse; inside is a bathysphere that takes him to Rapture. Jack is contacted via radio by Atlas, who helps guide him through the ruined city. Atlas requests Jack's help in saving his family, who he says are in a docked bathysphere. When Jack first encounters the Little Sisters, Atlas urges him to kill them to harvest their ADAM. Dr. Brigid Tenenbaum intervenes and insists Jack should spare them, providing him with a plasmid that can remove the sea slug from their bodies and free them of their brainwashing. Jack works his way to the bathysphere, but Ryan destroys it before Jack can reach it. Infuriated, Atlas has Jack fight his way through various districts toward Ryan's lair, forcing Jack to contend with Rapture's deranged citizens along the way, such as the surgical doctor J.S. Steinman and artist and musician Sander Cohen.

Jack enters Ryan's office. Ryan reveals the truth of Jack's origins: he is Ryan's illegitimate son, sold by Ryan's mistress as an embryo to Fontaine, who had Tenenbaum and Suchong rapidly age Jack into adulthood and turned into an obedient assassin, capable of accessing any of Rapture's systems locked to Ryan's genetic code and thus ensure Fontaine's victory in the war. Jack was smuggled to the surface with false memories of a normal life, waiting to be called back to Rapture when needed. Ryan takes control of Jack's actions by asking, "Would you kindly?"; a phrase that has preceded many of Atlas's commands as a hypnotic trigger, forcing him to follow any orders without question. Jack also realizes he was responsible for the plane crash, having read a letter onboard containing the same trigger phrase.

Ryan chooses to die by his own will and compels Jack to beat him to death with a golf club. Atlas reveals himself to be Fontaine, having faked his death and used "Atlas" as an alias to hide his identity while providing a heroic figure for the poor to rally behind. With Ryan dead, Fontaine takes control of the city and leaves Jack to be killed by hostile security drones. Jack is saved by Dr. Tenenbaum, who helps remove Fontaine's mental conditioning, including one that would have stopped Jack's heart. Jack pursues Fontaine to his lair, where Fontaine transforms himself into a hulking humanoid creature by injecting himself with a large supply of ADAM. The Little Sisters aid Jack in draining the ADAM from Fontaine's body and eventually kill him. The ending depends on how the player interacts with the Little Sisters:

- If the player rescues all of the Little Sisters, Jack takes them back to the surface with him and adopts five as his daughters. Tenenbaum happily narrates how they go on to live full lives under his care, eventually surrounding him on his deathbed.
- If the player harvests any of the Little Sisters, Jack turns on the Little Sisters to harvest their ADAM. Tenenbaum condemns Jack as he leads a group of Splicers to take over a nuclear warhead-armed submarine. Depending on how many of the Little Sisters are harvested, Tenenbaum's narrative changes from sad and mournful to angry and harsh.

== Gameplay ==
A Big Daddy defends a Little Sister (both on the right) from two Splicers, while the player watches.

BioShock is a first-person shooter with role-playing customization and stealth elements, and is similar to System Shock 2. The player takes the role of silent protagonist Jack as he is guided through Rapture towards various objectives. The player battles enemies using a combination of traditional weaponry and magic-like plasmids. Aside from the wrench, a melee weapon, players can upgrade their weapons through upgrade stations scattered across the environment; these upgrades modify weapons with added range, lessened recoil, or similar improvements. Weapons can also be equipped with different ammo types to increase effectiveness against varied targets. Plasmids confer superpowers such as casting fire or electric attacks, and in some cases can be used to access new areas—for example, melting ice blocking a path, or tripping the electric lock to open a door. Using plasmids requires EVE—the equivalent of mana—which can be replenished with EVE hypos or certain consumable food and drink. The player has a health meter that decreases when they take damage. The player can restore their health with food or medical packs found throughout Rapture. If the player's health is reduced to zero, they will respawn at a nearby Vita-Chamber, a device that functions as a checkpoint system. A patch for the game allows the Vita-Chambers to be turned off, requiring players to restart a saved game if the character dies.

In addition to plasmids, the player can collect and buy tonics that provide passive bonuses, such as increasing Jack's strength, using EVE more efficiently, or making Jack more resistant to damage. The player can only have a limited number of plasmids and tonics active at any time, and can swap between the various plasmids and tonics at certain stations located throughout Rapture. Plasmids and tonics are purchased using ADAM, which is gathered by choosing to harvest or save Little Sisters. If one chooses to harvest Little Sisters, they will get the maximum amount of Adam, but they won't survive the process. However If the player saves the Little Sisters, they will receive less Adam, but Tenenbaum will make it worth your while. Accessing the Little Sisters requires defeating the armored Big Daddies that protect them; if the player avoids attacking the Big Daddies or the Little Sisters, they remain neutral to the player.

The game provides several options to face challenges. In addition to direct combat, the player can use plasmids to lure enemies into traps or to turn enemies against each other, or employ stealth tactics to avoid detection by hostiles including the security systems and turrets. The player can hack into any of Rapture's automated systems; the hacking process is done via a mini-game where the player must connect two points on opposite sides of a grid with a limited set of piping within a fixed amount of time, with failure to complete in time costing health and potentially sounding alarms. Early in the game, the player is given a research camera; by taking photographs of enemies, the player will cumulatively gain knowledge about the individual foes which translates into attack boosts and other benefits when facing that enemy type in the future. The player collects money by exploring Rapture and from the bodies of defeated foes; this money can be used at vending machines to restock on ammunition, health and EVE, and other items; like security cameras, vending machines can be hacked to reduce the costs of items from it.

== Development ==
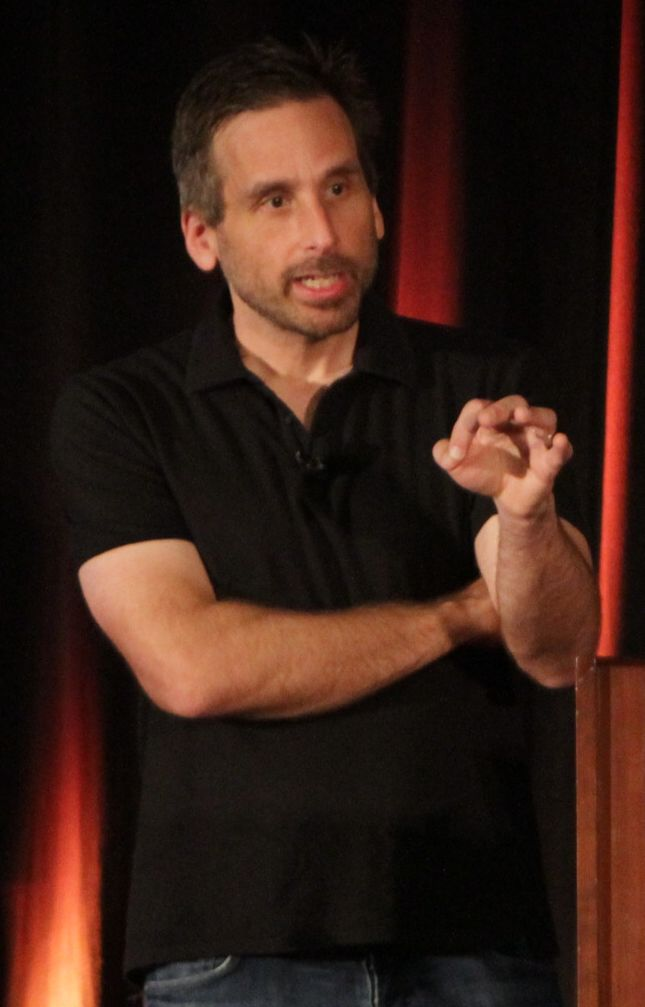
Ken Levine (pictured in 2014) directed BioShock along with Alyssa Finley.

Ken Levine and other members of Looking Glass Studios founded Irrational Games in 1997. Their first game was System Shock 2, a sequel to Looking Glass's System Shock, and was a critical, but not commercial, success. Levine had attempted to pitch a sequel to System Shock 2 to Electronic Arts, but the publisher rejected the idea based on System Shock 2's disappointing sales. Irrational developed other games, including Freedom Force, Tribes: Vengeance, the canceled title Deep Cover, and The Lost which was never released due to legal complications. The wanted to return to a more free-form game with strong narrative in the same style as System Shock 2, feeling there was more to do with some of the concept of that game. At the same time, they were mindful of making a successor that was more accessible to a wider variety of players. "We recognized that there were things in System Shock 2 that were holding it back, that were excessively complicated, that were opaque or hard for people to understand or that they simply didn't like," Irrational co-founder Jonathan Chey recalled.

By 2002, the team had come up with a core gameplay mechanic based on three groups: drones that would carry a desirable resource, protectors that would guard the drones, and harvesters that would attempt to take the resource from the drones. These groups would eventually become the Little Sisters, Big Daddies, and Splicers in the final game. They began working on a setting to pitch the idea to publishers. A 2002 demonstration version was based on the Unreal Engine 2 for the Xbox. This demonstration was primarily set aboard a space station overtaken with genetically mutated monsters; the main character was Carlos Cuello, a "cult deprogrammer"—a person charged with rescuing someone from a cult, and mentally and psychologically readjusting that person to a normal life. This story would have been more political in nature, with the character hired by a Senator. The team collectively agreed that this direction was not what they had set out to make, and were having trouble finding a publisher, as immersive sims did not sell well. They considered ending development, but as news about their efforts to create a spiritual successor to System Shock 2 began to appear in gaming magazines and websites, the team opted to continue development, performing a full revamp.

By 2004, 2K Games, a subsidiary of Take-Two Interactive, offered to publish the game primarily based on the drone/protector/harvester concept. By this point, the setting had shifted to an abandoned World War II-era Nazi laboratory that had been recently unearthed by 21st-century scientists. Over the decades, the genetic experiments within the labs had developed into the drone/protector/harvester ecosystem. This version included many of the gameplay elements that would remain in the final BioShock, themselves influenced by concepts from System Shock 2. These elements included the use of plasmids and weapon upgrades, or using stealth to evade enemies. When Irrational was acquired by 2K in 2006, the publisher boosted the previously-modest budget. While the gameplay with the 2004 reveal was similar to the released version of BioShock, the design and story would continue to change, consistent with what Levine says was Irrational's guiding principle of putting game design first. These changes also resulted from internal strife and lack of communication between the various teams within Irrational, part of the growing pains of expanding the team from six to sixty members during development. The environment was considered bland, and there were difficulties by the team's artists to come up with a consistent vision to meet the level designer's goals. Levine found that the cyberpunk theme had been overplayed considering Electronic Arts's rejection of System Shock 3, leading towards the underwater setting of Rapture.

Tensions within the team and from the publisher continued throughout development. According to LeBreton, Levine was distrustful of some of the more egotistical newer hires and was often arguing with them to enforce his vision of BioShock. 2K Games was concerned with the growing budget for the title, and told Levine to market the title more as a first-person shooter rather than the first-person shooter/role playing game hybrid they set out for. Near the targeted release date, Levine ordered the team into round-the-clock development, creating more strife in the team. Paul Hellquist, the game's lead designer, was often omitted from key design meetings, which he considered due to questioning Levine's choices; he redirected his frustration into improving the Medical Pavilion level that he was in charge of at that time. Near the anticipated completion date, 2K Games decided to give Irrational another three months to polish up the game, extending the crunch time the studio was already under.

After early rounds of positive feedback from family and friends, 2K used a beta version to conduct wider focus tests of the first level. Initial feedback from players was negative; players were lost and confused by the level, did not know how to use newly-acquired powers, and missed key story information. Testers distrusted the Atlas character, who at the time was voiced in a southern accent one tester described as a "lecherous Colonel Sanders". Project lead Alyssa Finley called the feedback "brutal", but humbling: the team realized that they were making a complex game that was not accessible to a variety of players. The opening levels of the game were redesigned to be more deliberate experiences that taught players key mechanics. The lighting was adjusted, a quest marker added for player way finding, and Atlas was given an Irish accent to make him sound more trustworthy. During another late-stage playtest with the title "ninety-nine percent" complete according to Levine, the playtesters did not like the game at all as they felt no connection to the player-character Jack, and the person overseeing the tests told Levine that the game was likely to be a failure. The following day, Levine and the lead group came up with a "cheap" way to correct this, by adding the initial cutscene within the plane and the subsequent plane crash, as this helped to set the time frame, place the player in the role of the character, and alluded to the "would you kindly" twist later in the game. Levine likened this approach to the initial aircraft crash at the onset of the television show Lost to quickly establish character and setting.

Total costs of development was about $25 million. During peak development 93 developers across 2K Boston, 2K Australia, and 2K Shanghai, along with more than 30 contractors and game testers, contributed to the game. In a 2016 interview, Levine felt that the game could have used about six more months of development to improve the gun combat system and fix lagging issues that occurred during the final boss fight. Many on the development team would leave Irrational after BioShock shipped due to its difficult development.

=== Art and design ===
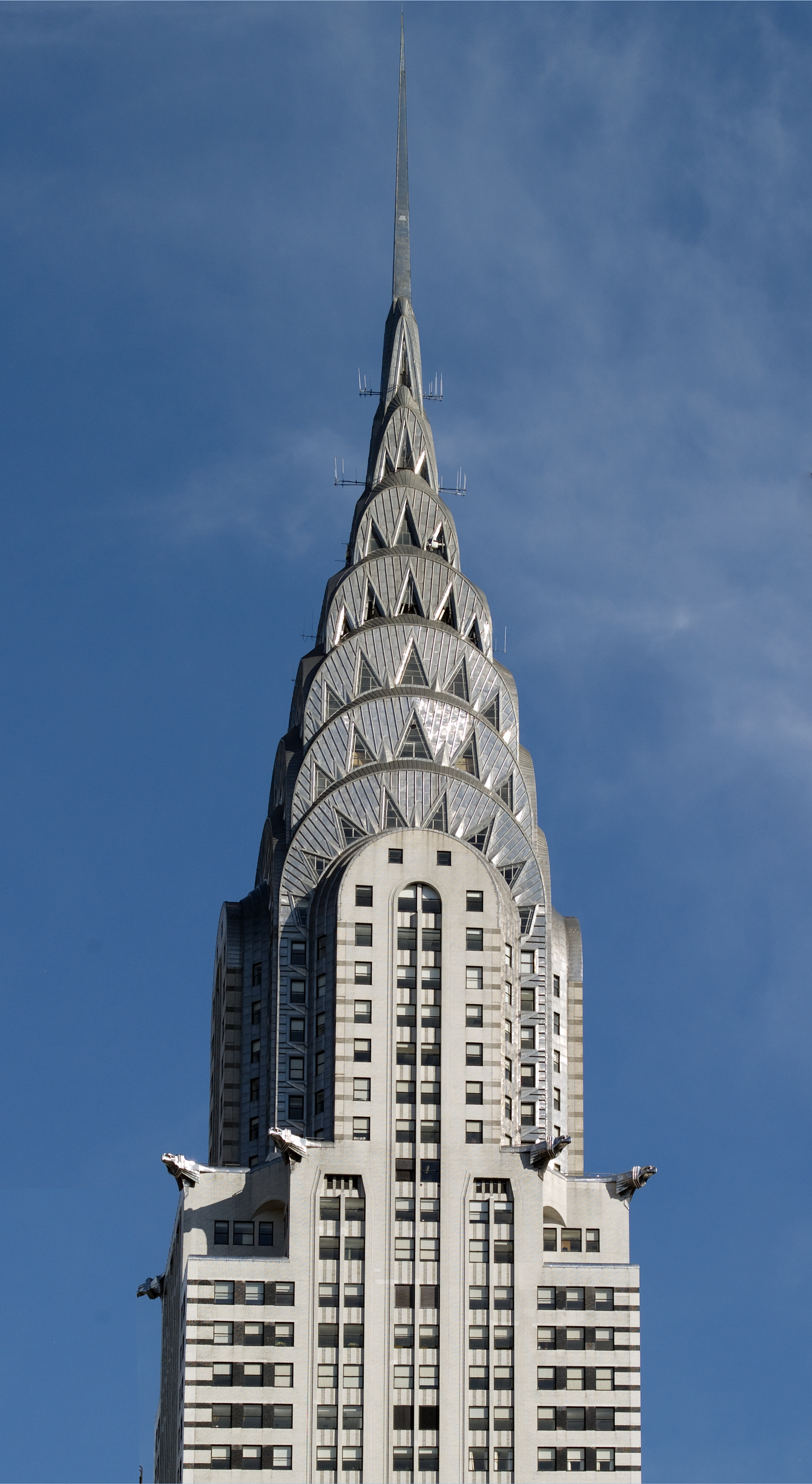
BioShock's game design drew on art deco for much of its imagery.

Scott Sinclair served as Bioshock's art director. Once the Rapture setting was chosen, the art team began developing concepts of what the city would look like, inside and out. Art Deco worked well as a style for the environments because its large, simple shapes were easy to replicate with few polygons. The artists drew inspiration from a Gotham-style metropolis, with Hugh Ferriss's architectural illustrations and the Art Deco architecture of New York City providing inspiration for the look and massing of Rapture's skyline. Irrational also wanted to stay away from "tropical" art deco as seen in places like Miami Beach as it did not create the feeling they wanted. Hogarth De La Plante recalled that the team did not want to be too rigid in following a look, instead adapting the style according to their needs.

The game's lead level designer was Bill Gardner. He cited Capcom's survival horror series Resident Evil as a significant influence on BioShock, stating there are "all these nods and all these little elements that I think you can see where Resident Evil inspired us". The team were particularly influenced by Resident Evil 4, including its approach to the environments, combat, and tools, its game design and tactical elements, its "gameplay fuelled storytelling" and inventory system, and its opening village level in terms of how it "handled the sandbox nature of the combat" and in terms of "the environment". The focus on a console release helped Irrational refine and simplify the gameplay to make it more accessible. Rather than having players go through convoluted interface menus to modify their weapons, upgrade their plasmids, or buy items, these functions were split into vending machines scattered around the game world. Early in level development, the levels were roughly blocked out, but no one was happy with the art department's attempts to decorate them. A critical junction was a short experiment performed by level designer Jean Paul LeBreton and artist Hoagy de la Plante, setting themselves aside to co-develop a level that became part of the "Tea Garden" area in the released game, which Levine used as a prime example of a "great BioShock space", emphasizing the need for departments to work together.

BioShock uses a heavily modified Unreal Engine 2.5 with some of the advanced technologies from Unreal Engine 3. Irrational had previous experience with modifying and expanding on the Unreal Engine in SWAT 4, and continued this advancement of the engine within BioShock. Given the game's setting, one significant improvement was made in the water systems, hiring a programmer and artist to focus on the water effects. Finley recalled that the team's deep familiarity with Unreal Engine was a blessing and curse, as it made prototyping the game very quick, but they were also more willing to accept fast-to-implement but inefficient solutions that ultimately cost more development time. BioShock also uses the Havok Physics engine that allows for the integration of ragdoll physics, and allows for more lifelike movement by elements of the environment. The Windows version was built to work in both Direct3D 10 (DirectX 10) and DirectX 9, with the DirectX 10 version supporting additional water and particle effects.

=== Story development ===
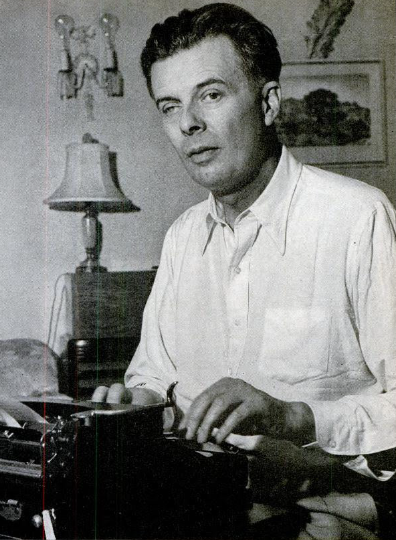
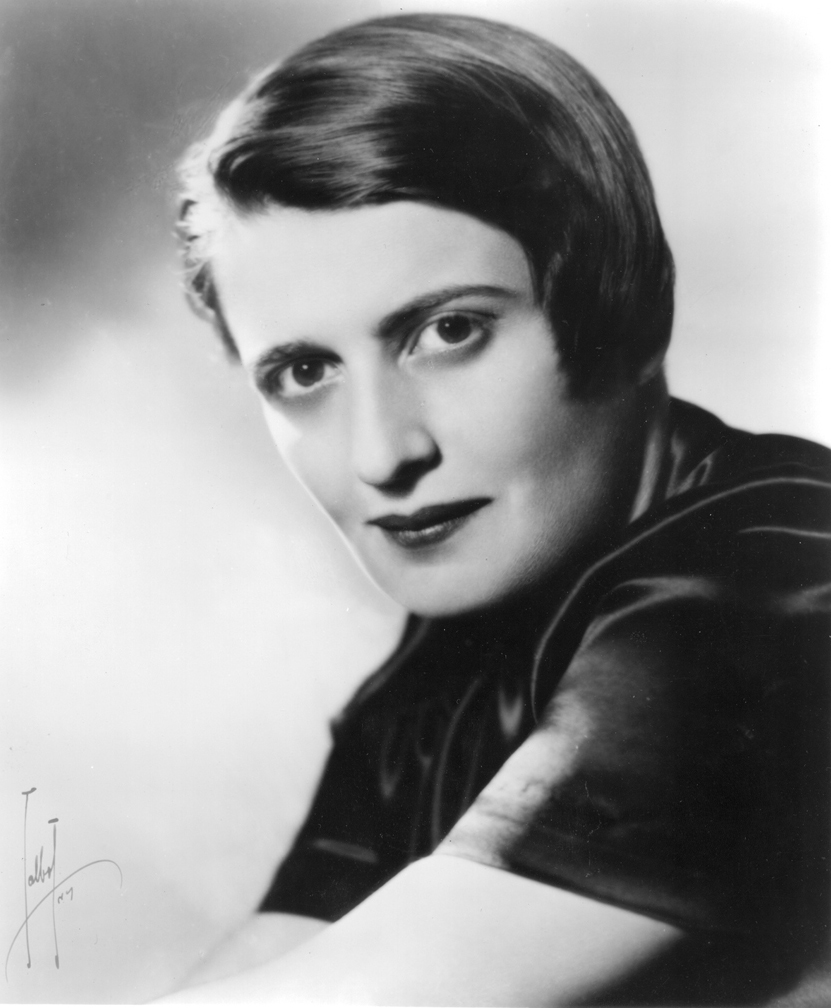
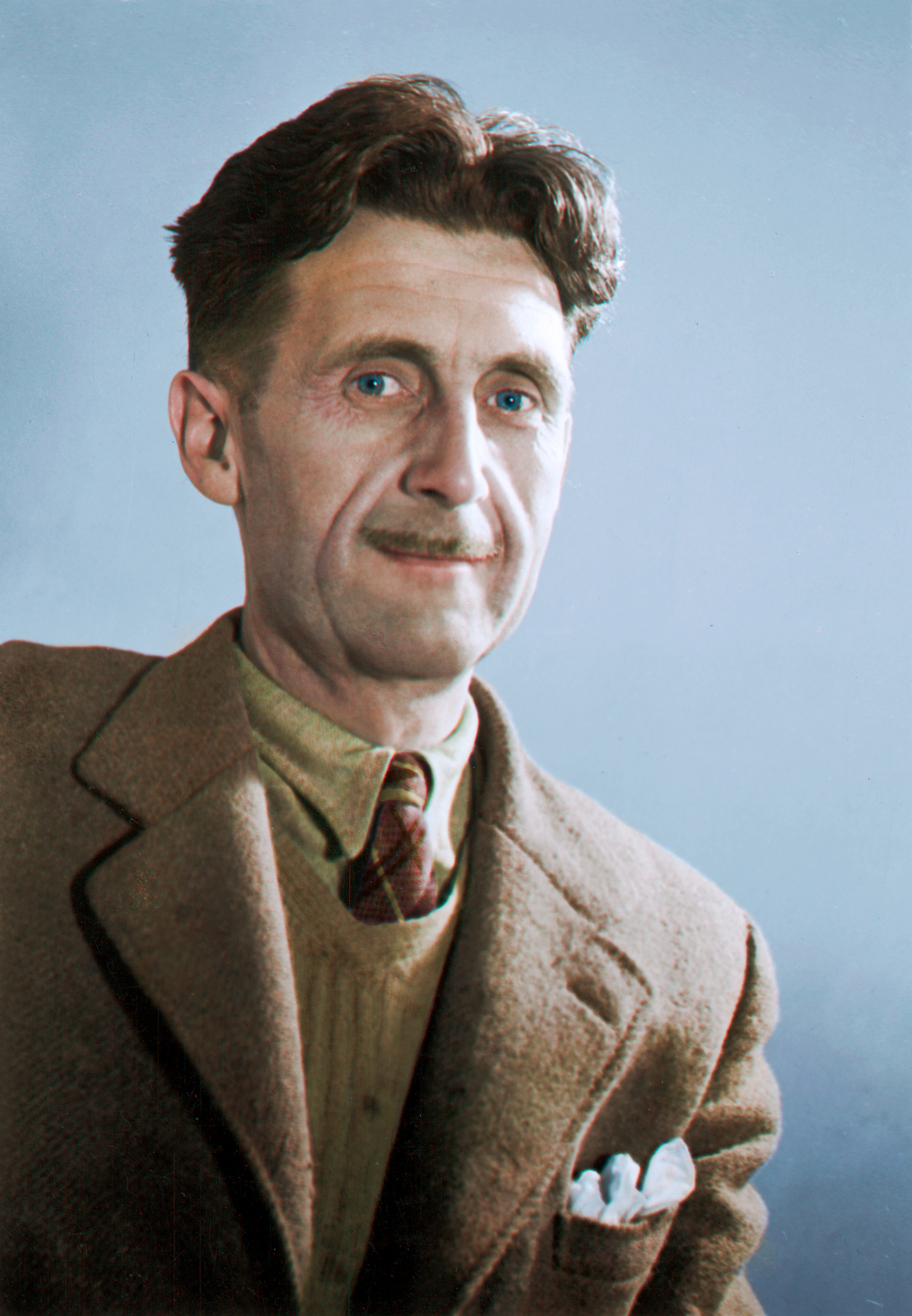
Figures such as Aldous Huxley (left), Ayn Rand (center) and George Orwell (right) served as inspiration for creating the story of BioShock

The story shifted drastically during development, with the final draft "an almost complete rewrite", according to Finley. By the time the final script was completed and recorded, it caused bottlenecks as the team had to implement the story content alongside fixing bugs in the rush to ship the game. By the time the setting of Rapture had been established, the team had not yet figured out how to implement the drone-protector-harvester model from their original game idea. The Big Daddy as the protector was developed first, but the team could not come up with a satisfying concept for the drones, having considered designs including bugs and dogs in wheelchairs. The team wanted to have the player care for the drones in some way and create pathos for these characters. The idea of using little girls came out of brainstorming, but was controversial and shocking within the team at first, recognizing that the children could easily be killed and make the game more horrific in the style of Night Trap. However, as Levine worked on the story, he started to incorporate the ideas of dystopian and utopian thinkers from the 20th century, including Ayn Rand, Aldous Huxley, and George Orwell. Levine found the ideas of Objectivism—that man should be driven by selfishness and not altruism—ludicrous and perfect for an antagonist, using them to inform the philosophy of Rapture and Andrew Ryan, tied in with his previous observations on Rockefeller and his writings. This philosophy extended to the use of the little girls as drones (now Little Sisters), particularly the question whether the player should try to save the girls or harvest the ADAM for their benefit. 2K Games expressed concern about the initial mechanic of the Little Sisters, where the player would actively prey on the Little Sister, which would have alerted a Big Daddy and set up the fight with the player. This approach did not sit well with Levine, and 2K Games asserted that they would not ship a game "where the player gets punished for doing the right thing". They altered this approach where the Little Sisters would be invulnerable until the player had dealt with their Big Daddy, though LeBreton considered this "a massive kludge" into the game's fiction. The idea of creating the Little Sisters and presenting the player with this choice became a critical part of the game's appeal to the broader gaming market, although it was met with criticism from some outlets. Levine desired only to have one ending to the game, something that would have left the fate of the characters "much more ambiguous", but publisher pressure directed them to craft multiple endings depending on the choice of harvesting Little Sisters. Levine also noted that "it was never my intention to do two endings for the game. It sort of came very late and it was something that was requested by somebody up the food chain from me."

Other elements came into the story design. Levine had an interest in "stem cell research and the moral issues that go around [it]". Regarding artistic influences, Levine cited the books Nineteen Eighty-Four and Logan's Run, representing societies that have "really interesting ideas screwed up by the fact that we're people". The idea of the mind control used on Jack was offered by LeBreton, inspired by films like The Manchurian Candidate, as a means to provide a better reason to limit the player's actions as opposed to the traditional use of locked doors to prevent them exploring areas they should not. The team had agreed that Jack's actions would be controlled by a key phrase but struggled with coming up with one that would not reveal Atlas' true nature. Levine happened upon "Would you kindly" after working on marketing materials for the game that asked the reader hypothetical questions such as "Would you kill people, even innocent people, to survive?", later working that phrase into the first script for the game. Levine's cultural background unintentionally influenced the game's themes, with the game's characters reflecting his culturally, but not religious, Jewish background. In the 2018 interview, Levine recognized several of the characters, including Andrew Ryan (who was inspired by Ayn Rand who was also Jewish), Sander Cohen, and Brigid Tenenbaum, were written all as Jewish, and all seeking to escape a world they felt they did not fit into by going to Rapture; Levine said: "'There's literal displacement and then there's a feeling of not fitting in, of 'I don't really belong here'. I think Jews are always going to feel a little bit like they don't belong wherever they are. There's always that 'what if we have to flee' mentality." Levine considered that many of the characters of Rapture were all people who were oppressed once before in their lives and now free of that oppression, have turned around and become the oppressors, a fact he felt resonated throughout human history.

=== Audio ===
BioShock contains both licensed music and an original score. The licensed music from the 1930s, 1940s, and 1950s can be heard playing on phonograph throughout Rapture. In total, 30 licensed songs can be heard throughout the game. The original score was composed by Garry Schyman. He composed his pieces to blend with the chosen licensed music as to keep the same feel, while also trying to bring out something that was "eerie, frightening and at times beautiful" to mesh well with Rapture's environments.

2K Games released an orchestral score soundtrack on their official homepage on August 24, 2007. Available in MP3 format, the score—composed by Garry Schyman—contains 12 of the 22 tracks from the game. The Limited Edition version of the game came with The Rapture EP remixes by Moby and Oscar The Punk. The three remixed tracks on the CD include "Beyond the Sea", "God Bless the Child" and "Wild Little Sisters"; the original recordings of these songs are in the game. BioShock's score was released on a vinyl LP with the BioShock 2 Special Edition.

== Release and promotion ==
BioShock's first public showing was at E3 2006. After a fan petition calling for a special edition of the game reached 5,000 signatures, 2K Games announced a limited edition of the game, featuring a Big Daddy figurine, making-of materials, and the game's soundtrack. Before the special edition was released, the proposed soundtrack CD was replaced with The Rapture EP.

BioShock was released on August 21, 2007, in North America, and August 24 in Europe and Australia for Windows and Xbox 360 platforms. The demo released the week before release was so popular the demand crashed Xbox Live's servers. The Windows release shipped with SecuROM copy protection that required activation from 2K Games' servers over the Internet; the unavailability of these servers was reported as the reason for the cancellation of the game's midnight release in Australia. Complaints from players caused 2K Games to raise the simultaneous installation limit for the game from two to five copies; the activation limit was removed after the release of the game, though other copy protection methods remained. Levine admitted that their initial approach to the activation process was malformed, harming their reputation during the launch period. The initial release of the game also cropped the top and bottom of the field of view in order to fit widescreen monitors, resulting in less vertical view instead of more horizontal view compared to 4:3 monitors.

The first patch for the Xbox 360 version was released about two weeks after release to fix some of the game stability issues players had reported. The patch was found to introduce more problems to the game for some users, including occasional freezes, bad framerates, and audio-related issues, though methods to resolve these issues through the console's cache system were outlined by Irrational Games. In December 2007, a common patch was released for both the Xbox 360 and Windows version. The patch included additional content such as new Plasmids, new achievements for the Xbox 360 version, and a FOV lock that allowed widescreen players a wider field of view without losing vertical information. The patch also added in an option to disable the use of Vita-Chambers, a feature requested by players to make the game more challenging, as well as an achievement to complete the game at its hardest setting without using a Vita-Chamber. In 2014, 2K Games released a DRM-free version of BioShock in the Humble 2K Bundle, followed by DRM-free releases on GOG in 2018.

=== Ports ===
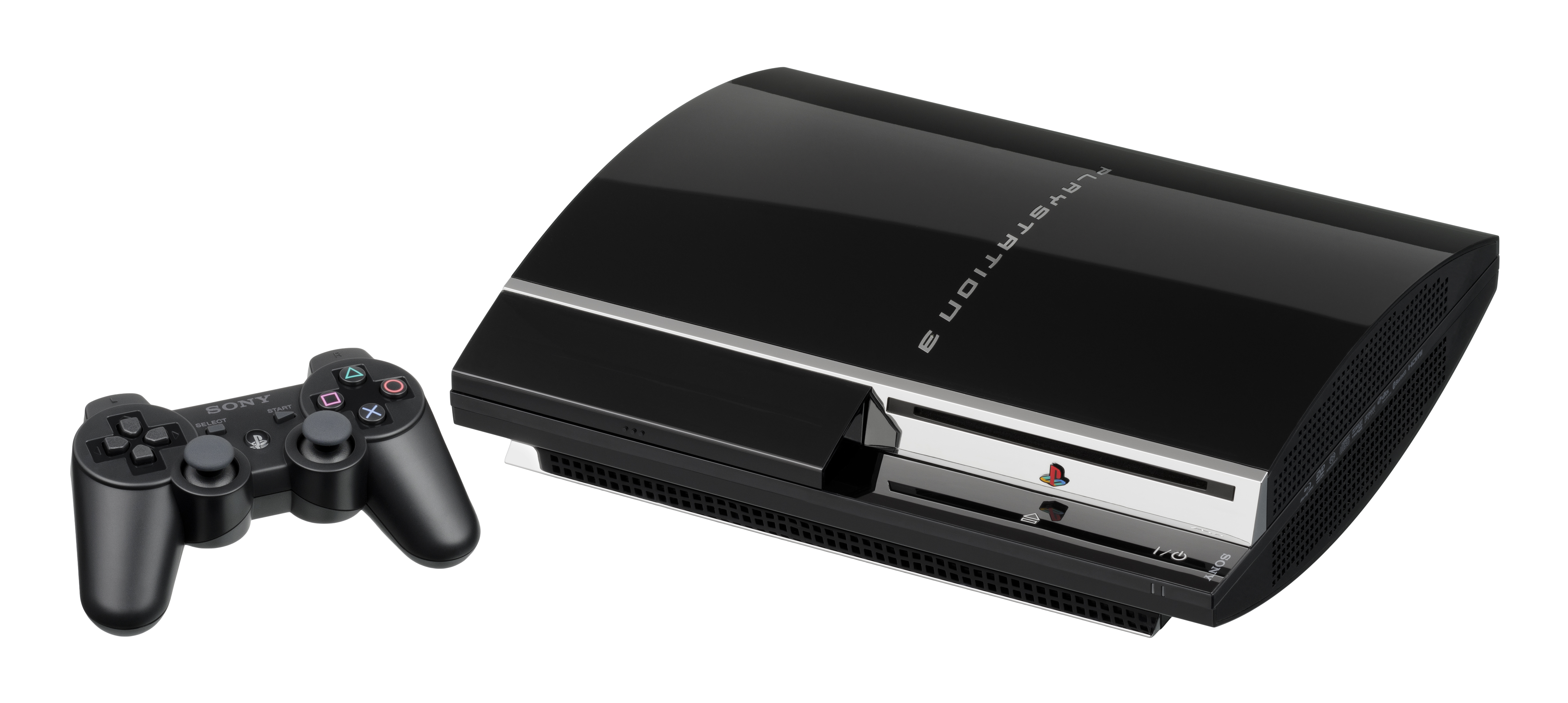
A port of BioShock for PlayStation 3 was released in 2008

In 2008, 2K Games confirmed that a PlayStation 3 version of the game was in development by 2K Marin. On July 3, 2008, 2K Games announced a partnership with Digital Extremes and said that the PlayStation 3 version is being developed by 2K Marin, 2K Boston, 2K Australia, and Digital Extremes. Jordan Thomas was the director for the PlayStation 3 version. While there were no graphical improvements to the game over the original Xbox 360 version, the PlayStation 3 version offered the widescreen option called "horizontal plus", introduced via a patch on the 360 version, while cutscene videos were of a much higher resolution than in the DVD version. Additional add-on content was also released exclusively for the PlayStation 3 version. One addition was "Survivor Mode", in which the enemies were made tougher, and Vita-Chambers provided less of a health boost when used, forcing the player to be more creative in approaching foes and to rely more on the less-used plasmids in the game. BioShock also supports Trophies and PlayStation Home. A demo version was released on the PlayStation Store on October 2, 2008. The game was released for PlayStation 3 on October 17, 2008, internationally and on October 21 in North America. An update for the PlayStation 3 version was released on November 13, 2008, to fix some graphical problems and occasions where users experienced a hang and were forced to reset the console. This update also incorporated the "Challenge Rooms" and "New Game Plus" features. BioShock was bundled with The Elder Scrolls IV: Oblivion as a double pack on PC and Xbox 360 on July 7, 2009. A port to OS X systems was made by Feral Interactive and released in October 2009.

In early 2008, IG Fun secured the rights to develop and publish a mobile phone version of BioShock. This version was developed as a top-down, two-dimensional platformer that attempted to recreate most of the plot and game elements of the original title; IG Fun worked with Irrational to determine the critical story elements they wanted to keep in the game. IG Fun recognized they would not be able to include the full storyline within a single mobile title, and so planned to split the title into three "episodes". Only the first episode was released. Another mobile port was developed by Tridev, known as BioShock 3D, released in 2010. Several parts of the game were reduced to single image graphics and the main gameplay engine had to use low-resolution and low-polygon models due to the limitations of mobile phones at the time of its release. A port to iOS devices done by the 2K China studio was released on August 27, 2014. The iOS version is content complete and functionally equivalent to the original Xbox 360 and Windows version, featuring either the use of touch-screen virtual gamepad controls or the use of a Bluetooth-enabled controller, and with a graphics engine optimized for iOS devices. The game was later delisted from the App Store in September 2015; the game had become unplayable for many that upgraded to iOS 8.4 on their devices, and while a patch had been discussed, a 2K representative stated that the decision to remove the game came from the developer. 2K later said they would work on resolving the issues with the game's compatibility with the new firmware and will re-release the title once that has been completed, but 2K later dropped the effort.

=== Sales ===
The Xbox 360 version was the third best-selling game of August 2007, with 490,900 copies. The Wall Street Journal reported that shares in Take-Two Interactive "soared nearly 20%" in the week following overwhelmingly favorable early reviews of the game. Take-Two Interactive announced that by June 5, 2008, over 2.2 million copies of BioShock had been shipped. In a June 10, 2008 interview, Roy Taylor, Nvidia's VP of Content Business Development, stated that the PC version has sold over one million copies. According to Take-Two Interactive's chairman Strauss Zelnick, the game had sold around 3 million copies by June 2009. By March 2010, BioShock had sold 4 million copies, with the release of its sequel, BioShock 2, boosting sales of the original game.

== Reception ==
=== Critical response ===
Reception

Aggregate score
Aggregator	Score
Metacritic	PC: 96/100; PS3: 94/100; X360: 96/100 iOS: 68/100

Review scores
Publication	Score
1Up.com	A+
Destructoid	10/10
Edge	8/10
Eurogamer	10/10
Game Informer	10/10
GameSpot	9/10
GameSpy	5/5
IGN	9.7/10
Official Xbox Magazine (UK)	10/10
PC Gamer (UK)	9.5/10
PC Zone	9.6/10

BioShock received highly positive reviews from critics, with an average review score of 96/100 for Xbox 360 and Microsoft Windows, and 94/100 for PlayStation 3 on reviews aggregator Metacritic. Mainstream press reviews praised the immersive qualities of the game and its political dimension. The Boston Globe described it as "a beautiful, brutal, and disquieting computer game ... one of the best in years", and compared the game to Whittaker Chambers' 1957 riposte to Atlas Shrugged, "Big Sister Is Watching You". Wired also mentioned the Ayn Rand connection (a partial anagram of Andrew Ryan) in a report on the game which featured a brief interview with Levine. The Chicago Sun-Times review said "I never once thought anyone would be able to create an engaging and entertaining video game around the fiction and philosophy of Ayn Rand, but that is essentially what 2K Games has done ... the rare, mature video game that succeeds in making you think while you play".

The Los Angeles Times review concluded: "Sure, it's fun to play, looks spectacular and is easy to control. But it also does something no other game has done to date: It really makes you feel." The New York Times reviewer described it as: "intelligent, gorgeous, occasionally frightening" and added: "Anchored by its provocative, morality-based story line, sumptuous art direction and superb voice acting, BioShock can also hold its head high among the best games ever made."

GameSpy praised BioShock's "inescapable atmosphere", and Official Xbox Magazine lauded its "inconceivably great plot" and "stunning soundtrack and audio effects". The gameplay and combat system have been praised for being smooth and open-ended, and elements of the graphics, such as the water, were commended for their quality. It has been noted that the combination of the game's elements "straddles so many entertainment art forms so expertly that it's the best demonstration yet how flexible this medium can be. It's no longer just another shooter wrapped up in a pretty game engine, but a story that exists and unfolds inside the most convincing and elaborate and artistic game world ever conceived."

Reviewers did highlight a few negative issues in BioShock, however. The recovery system involving "Vita-Chambers", which revive a defeated player at half-health, but do not alter the enemies' health, makes it possible to wear down enemies through sheer perseverance, and was criticized as one of the most significant flaws in the gameplay. IGN noted that both the controls and graphics of the Xbox 360 version are inferior to those of the PC version, in that switching between weapons or plasmids is easier using the PC's mouse than the 360's radial menu, as well as the graphics being slightly better with higher resolutions. The game has been touted as a hybrid first-person shooter, but two reviewers found advances from comparable games lacking, both in the protagonist and in the challenges he faces. Some reviewers also found the combat behavior of the splicers lacking in diversity (and their A.I. behavior not very well done), and the moral choice too much "black and white" to be interesting. Some reviewers and essayists such as Jonathan Blow also opined that the "moral choice" the game offered to the player (saving or harvesting the little sisters) was flawed because, to them, it had no real impact on the game, which ultimately led them to think that the sisters were just mechanics of no real importance. Daniel Friedman for Polygon concurred with Blow, noting that the player only loses 10% of the possible ADAM rewards for saving the Little Sisters rather than killing them, and felt that this would have been better instituted as part of the game difficulty mechanic.

=== Awards ===
At E3 2006, BioShock was given several "Games of the Show" awards from various online gaming sites, including GameSpot, IGN, GameSpy and GameTrailers's Trailer of the Year. After the game's release, the 2007 Spike TV Video Game Awards selected BioShock as Game of the Year, Best Xbox 360 Game, and Best Original Score, and nominated it for four awards: Best Shooter, Best Graphics, Best PC Game, and Best Soundtrack. The game also won the 2007 BAFTA "Best Game" award. X-Play also selected it as "Game of the Year", "Best Original Soundtrack", "Best Writing/Story", and "Best Art Direction". Game Informer named BioShock its Game of the Year for 2007.

At IGN's "Best of 2007" BioShock was nominated for Game of The Year 2007, and won the award for PC Game of the Year, Best Artistic Design, and Best Use of Sound. GameSpy chose it as the third-best game of the year and gave BioShock the awards for Best Sound, Story, and Art Direction. GameSpot awarded the game for Best Story, while GamePro gave BioShock the Best Story, Xbox 360 and Best Single-Player Shooter awards. BioShock won the "Best Visual Art", "Best Writing", and "Best Audio" awards at the 2008 Game Developers Choice Awards. During the AIAS' 11th Annual Interactive Achievement Awards, BioShock received the most nominations of the ceremony with twelve, including notable categories such as "Outstanding Innovation in Gaming", "Action Game of the Year", and "Overall Game of the Year"; it was ultimately awarded with outstanding achievement in "Art Direction", "Original Music Composition", "Sound Design", and "Story Development". Guinness World Records awarded the game a record for "Most Popular Xbox Live Demo" in the Guinness World Records: Gamer's Edition 2008. BioShock is ranked first on Game Informer's list of The Top 10 Video Game Openings. GamesRadar placed Bioshock as the 12th best game of all time. In 2011 BioShock was awarded the number 1 spot in GameTrailers' "Top 100 Video Game Trailers of All Time", for submerging the viewer into the BioShock universe and its enduring impact. In August 2012, IGN gave it the top spot on their list of the Top 25 Modern PC Games, a ranking of the best PC games released since 2006. In November 2012, Time named it one of the 100 greatest video games of all time. In July 2015, the game placed 9th on USgamer's The 15 Best Games Since 2000 list.

== Legacy ==
BioShock has received praise for its artistic style and compelling storytelling. In their book, Digital Culture: Understanding New Media, Glen Creeber and Royston Martin perform a case study of BioShock as a critical analysis of video games as an artistic medium. They praised the game for its visuals, sound, and ability to engage the player into the story. They viewed BioShock as a sign of the "coming of age" of video games as an artistic medium. John Lanchester of the London Review of Books recognized BioShock as one of the first video games to break into coverage of mainstream media to be covered as a work of art arising from its narrative aspects, whereas before video games had failed to enter into the "cultural discourse", or otherwise covered due to moral controversies they created. Peter Suderman for Vox in 2016 wrote that BioShock was the first game that demonstrated that video games could be a work of art, particularly highlighting that the game plays on the theme of giving the illusion of individual control. In February 2011, the Smithsonian Institution announced it would hold an exhibit dedicated to the art of video games. Several games were chosen by the Smithsonian's curators; when the public voted for additional games they felt deserved to be included in the exhibition, BioShock was among the winners. The game's plot twist, where the player discovers that the player-character Jack has been coerced into events by the trigger phrase, "Would you kindly...", is considered one of the strongest narrative elements of video games to that point. In homage to BioShock, Black Mirror's video game-centric episode "Playtest" includes the phrase.

A sequel, BioShock 2, was announced in 2008, with its development led by 2K Marin. BioShock 2 was released for Windows PC, Mac, Xbox 360, and the PlayStation 3 worldwide on February 9, 2010. Irrational Games developed BioShock Infinite, taking place aboard the collapsing air-city of Columbia in the year 1912. Infinite involves the possibilities of multiple universes. In one scene, the game take place at the lighthouse and bathysphere terminus of Rapture as part of this exploration. However, no direct canonical connection is given in the main game. The episodic expansion, Burial at Sea, takes place in Rapture in 1959, before the war between Atlas and Ryan, while continuing the story of Booker DeWitt and Elizabeth. This content links the two stories while providing expansion on the causes and behind-the-scenes events alluded to by the in-game background from BioShock. After completing BioShock Infinite and its expansion, Levine announced that he was restructuring Irrational Games to focus on smaller, narrative-driven titles. 2K Games continues to hold on to the BioShock intellectual property and plans to continue to develop games in this series. According to Bloomberg News, 2K Games was developing a remake of the original BioShock game but shelved the project in 2025.

BioShock was remastered to support 1080p and higher framerates as part of the 2016 BioShock: The Collection release for Windows, PlayStation 4, and Xbox One systems. The remastering was performed by Blind Squirrel Games and published by 2K Games. A standalone version of BioShock Remastered was released for macOS by Feral Interactive on August 22, 2017. The standalone version of the remastered version of BioShock along with The Collection were released on May 29, 2020, on the Nintendo Switch.

=== Analysis ===
BioShock has received extensive scholarly attention for its treatment of player agency, particularly the relationship between the player and the player character, Jack. In a 2019 meta-synthesis of 59 studies of agency in video games, Stephanie C. Jennings found that 15 used BioShock or BioShock Infinite as primary case studies, describing the franchise as disproportionately influential in academic discussions of choice, free will, and control. Jennings observed that scholarship on the original game repeatedly focused on the revelation of Jack's conditioning and Andrew Ryan's death, using the sequence to debate whether video games provide meaningful agency or merely an appearance of choice. Rowan Tulloch interpreted the game's narrative twist as a deliberate challenge to conventional assumptions about interactivity. He argued that BioShock connects its narrative to its gameplay mechanics in order to deconstruct the idea that the player is freely determining events. For Tulloch, the game trains the player to accept its rules and objectives before revealing that Jack has likewise been trained to obey Atlas, making the player's learned compliance with the game system part of the narrative's treatment of control. He consequently viewed BioShock not simply as denying agency, but as demonstrating how a player's sense of choice and subjectivity can be constructed through the process of playing.

Jessica Aldred and Brian Greenspan similarly analyzed BioShock as a critique of the apparent freedom offered by interactive media. They argued that the game simultaneously presents the player with numerous opportunities for action while restricting how its narrative can progress. This tension becomes explicit during Jack's confrontation with Ryan: after the player has spent much of the game directly controlling Jack, control is removed while Jack is compelled to kill Ryan. Aldred and Greenspan interpreted the sequence as exposing a distinction between the player's experience of autonomy and the predetermined structures governing both Jack and the player, and related this contradiction to the game's broader critique of technological progress and individual freedom. Stefan Schubert connected the same sequence to the game's use of Objectivism. He argued that Atlas initially resembles a conventional video-game guide, directing the player's actions in a manner that players have been conditioned by other games to accept without questioning. The revelation that Jack has been compelled to obey Atlas therefore operates on both a narrative and a metatextual level: Jack discovers the limits of his own autonomy while the player is made aware of having voluntarily followed substantially the same instructions. Schubert nevertheless rejected a simple conclusion that BioShock presents all choice as meaningless. He contrasted the predetermined confrontation with Ryan with the player's treatment of the Little Sisters, which can alter the game's ending, and argued that the game instead presents agency as limited and internally contradictory.

The distinction between Jack and the player has also informed debate over ludonarrative dissonance, a term introduced by game designer Clint Hocking in a 2007 critique of BioShock. Hocking argued that the game permits players to pursue self-interest through its mechanics while obliging Jack to help Atlas through its narrative, creating a conflict between the values expressed through play and those expressed through the story. In a 2026 reassessment, Connor Jackson disputed this reading. Jackson argued that Jack's conditioning provides an in-universe explanation for his obedience to Atlas and cautioned against assuming that the motivations of a controllable avatar must correspond to those of the player. He also emphasized that the rescue-or-harvest decisions concerning the Little Sisters have substantial narrative consequences, and therefore considered BioShock's treatment of agency more complex than a simple contradiction between an inflexible story and flexible gameplay. Jennings identified this disagreement as characteristic of the wider scholarship on BioShock. Although many studies have treated the game as evidence that video-game agency is fundamentally illusory, others have distinguished between different kinds and degrees of agency rather than treating control as either wholly present or absent. She argued that even choices constrained by a designed system can produce meaningful experiences of responsibility, investment, and interpretation, and used the extensive debate surrounding BioShock to argue for a more contingent understanding of agency in games.

== See also ==
- List of underwater science fiction works
- Ludonarrative dissonance—a term coined to describe conflict between narrative aspects of BioShock's story and gameplay

Awards and achievements
Preceded by The Elder Scrolls IV: Oblivion	Spike TV Video Game Awards Game of the Year; 2007	Succeeded by Grand Theft Auto IV
