= Andrew Ryan (BioShock) =

BioShock character

- BioShock character
- Andrew Ryan in BioShock (2007)
- First appearance: BioShock (2007)
- Created by: Ken Levine
- Voiced by: Armin Shimerman

In-universe information
- Origin: Minsk, Russian Empire

Andrew Ryan is a fictional character in the BioShock video game series created by Ken Levine and developed by Irrational Games. Voiced by Armin Shimerman, he is the founder and ruler of the underwater city of Rapture and the secondary antagonist of the first BioShock. Although encountered directly only once, Ryan is a pervasive presence throughout the game through broadcasts, audio recordings and the ideology embedded in Rapture itself. He later appears posthumously in BioShock 2 and its multiplayer mode and returns during the events preceding the first game in BioShock Infinite: Burial at Sea.

Ryan is portrayed in BioShock as an uncompromising individualist whose attempt to establish a society free from government, religion and regulation collapses as Rapture descends into civil war. His characterization drew particularly from Ayn Rand and Objectivism, with Levine also citing businessman Howard Hughes as an influence. Levine contrasted Ryan's sincere commitment to his ideals with the opportunism of Frank Fontaine, and developed Ryan's confrontation with protagonist Jack around the character's belief that individual choice is more important than survival.

Ryan has been positively received for his characterization and Shimerman's performance, and has been regarded as one of the best video game antagonists. His ideology, the failure of Rapture, and his final confrontation with Jack have also received extensive scholarly analysis. Critics and academics have particularly examined Ryan in relation to Objectivism, individualism, authoritarianism, and BioShock's treatment of free will and player agency.

== Concept and creation ==
BioShock director Ken Levine developed Andrew Ryan as a character whose commitment to an ideology distinguished him from the game's other principal antagonist, Frank Fontaine. Levine described Fontaine as a nihilist who believes in nothing beyond his own interests, whereas Ryan is defined by his ideals; he considered both characters extremists, but said that Ryan's beliefs were intended to make him recognizably human rather than a conventional monster.

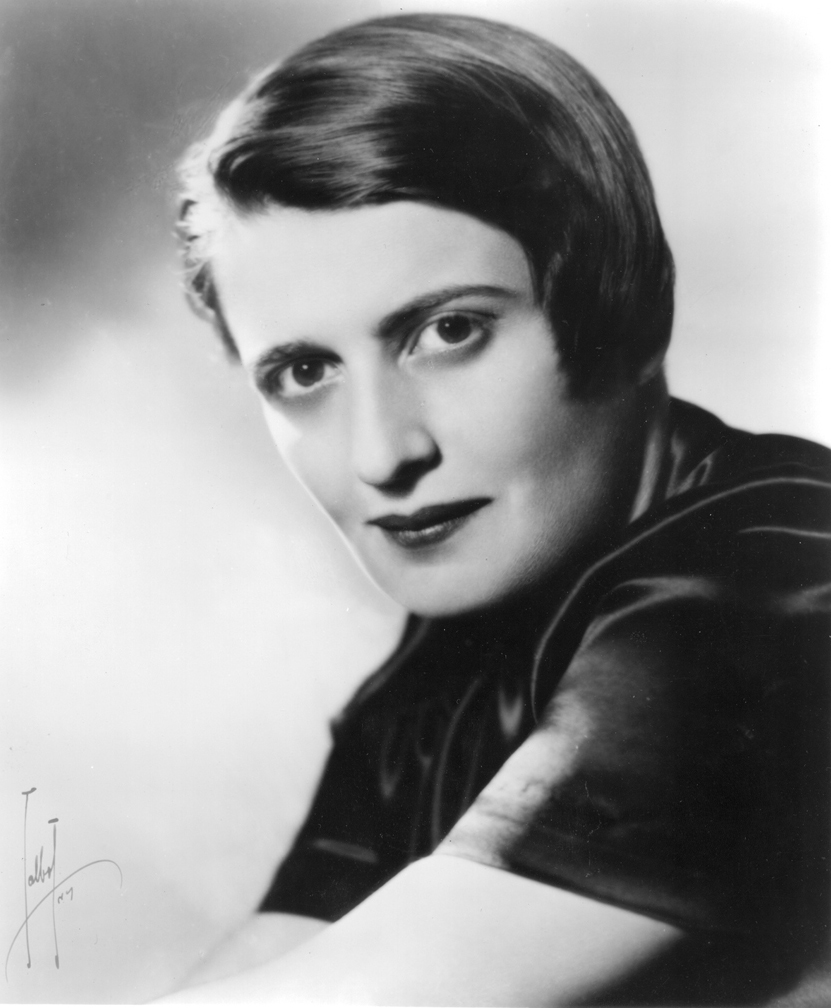
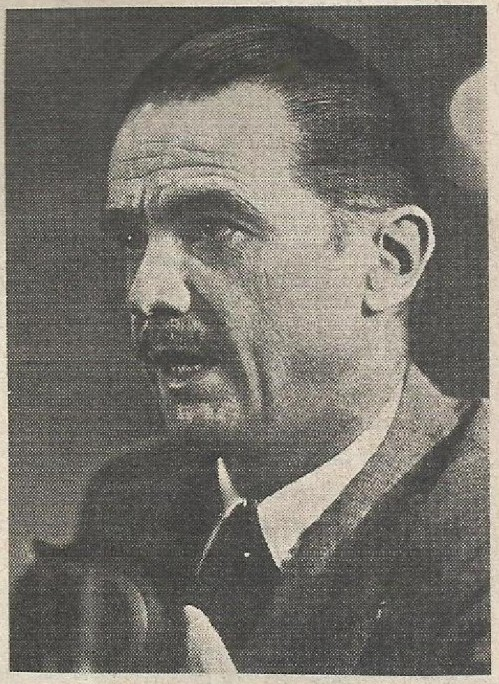
Ayn Rand (left) and Howard Hughes (right) were among the historical figures who inspired Andrew Ryan's characterization.

Levine described Ryan as a composite of historical figures, particularly Howard Hughes and Ayn Rand. Levine said that he was interested less in presenting a direct attack on Objectivism than in examining what happens when an idealized philosophy is implemented by fallible people. He contrasted Ryan with the idealized protagonists of Rand's novels, explaining that Ryan was intended to behave more like a real person: despite his ideological conviction, he experiences fear and doubt, makes mistakes, and ultimately compromises some of the principles on which Rapture was founded.

Ryan's background was developed partly in parallel with Rand's. Levine later explained that Ryan's background was developed as a middle-class Russian Jew whose family's livelihood was destroyed during the Russian Revolution, an experience that fostered his distrust of collectivism and government intervention. Ryan's subsequent dissatisfaction with restrictions in the United States was intended to motivate his construction of Rapture as a society in which he believed individuals could work without governmental, religious or regulatory restraint. Levine characterized this personal history, rather than Ryan's ethnic or religious identity by itself, as the basis for his motivations, explaining that his approach to characterization began with determining what a character wanted and which experiences had produced those desires.

The developers spent considerable time devising Ryan's only face-to-face encounter with protagonist Jack. Levine rejected a conventional boss battle, instead having Ryan deliberately allow Jack to kill him after demonstrating that Jack has been conditioned to obey commands. Levine said Ryan's ideology had to remain more important to him than survival: by choosing his own death while showing that Jack could not choose whether to kill him, Ryan could preserve his convictions and demonstrate what Levine called the "ultimate insult" to the player. The scene also exploited the normally linear structure of video games. When a player later asked Levine why BioShock did not permit Jack to spare Ryan, Levine acknowledged that Irrational generally constructed a single predetermined plot and said that dynamically branching narratives presented substantial design difficulties.

Levine subsequently identified Ryan's narrative resolution as one of the game's structural weaknesses. During a 2008 Game Developers Conference presentation, he said that he had underestimated how much of the player's emotional investment depended on the mystery surrounding Ryan; once that mystery was resolved, the narrative lost some of its momentum. He used the experience to illustrate what he called a "mystery balloon", in which unanswered questions sustain a player's interest and must be resolved without exhausting the narrative's remaining tension.

== Appearances ==
Ryan is encountered in person only once in the BioShock series, with much of his characterization conveyed through broadcasts, audio diaries and the remains of the society he created. Born in the Russian Empire, Ryan fled the country following the Russian Revolution and eventually became a wealthy businessman in the United States. Disillusioned by government and religious intervention, he secretly used his fortune to construct the underwater city of Rapture, intended as a society in which individuals could pursue their work without external regulation. The tie-in novel BioShock: Rapture expands his early history, identifying his birth name as Andrei Rianofski and describing his emigration from Russia and the creation of Rapture.

In BioShock, Rapture has largely collapsed following a civil war between Ryan and the followers of criminal businessman Frank Fontaine, who has reinvented himself as the revolutionary leader Atlas. Ryan initially interprets the arrival of the player character, Jack, as an incursion by a foreign government and repeatedly attempts to prevent him from advancing through the city. Jack eventually discovers that he is Ryan's genetically engineered son and had been created by Fontaine as a sleeper agent capable of bypassing Rapture's genetic security systems. Fontaine had conditioned Jack to obey commands preceded by the phrase "would you kindly", while masquerading as Atlas and using the same phrase to direct Jack through Rapture. When Jack reaches Ryan's office, Ryan reveals Fontaine's manipulation and demonstrates Jack's conditioning. Maintaining that "a man chooses, a slave obeys", Ryan refuses to flee and instead uses the trigger phrase to command Jack to kill him with a golf club. Jack is unable to resist, allowing Ryan to choose the circumstances of his death while demonstrating Jack's lack of autonomy.

Ryan appears in BioShock 2 and its story DLC Minerva's Den, which are set eight years after his death, through audio diaries and locations associated with his rule. These include Ryan Amusements, a theme park created to indoctrinate Rapture's children with Ryan's ideology and discourage interest in the surface world. The game's multiplayer mode takes place shortly before the original BioShock and features Ryan addressing Rapture's population during the city's civil war; its narrative concludes with his announcement that Jack has entered the city and his orders that Rapture's citizens hunt him down.

BioShock Infinite: Burial at Sea depicts Ryan during the period immediately preceding the original game. After defeating Fontaine, Ryan has the crime boss' department store separated from Rapture and sunk into an ocean trench with Fontaine's followers trapped inside. He contacts Elizabeth after she enters the department store and, impressed by her tenacity and abilities, offers her employment. When she refuses and continues assisting Atlas, Ryan sends his security forces into the store to eliminate her and Atlas's remaining supporters.

== Reception ==
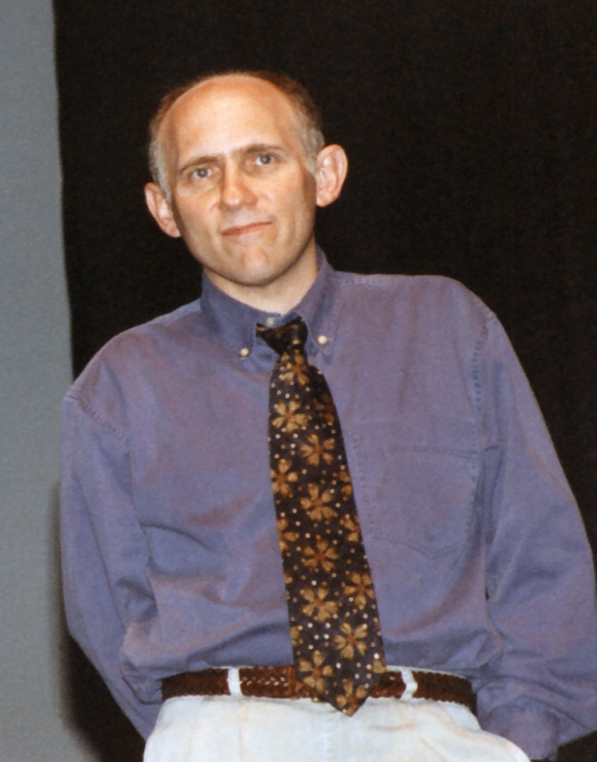
Armin Shimerman provided the voice for Andrew Ryan. He has received praise for his portrayal.

Andrew Ryan received positive attention from critics for his characterization and ideological role in BioShock. In his review for IGN, Charles Onyett described Ryan as an atypical antagonist whose ambition in constructing Rapture made him more complex than a conventional villain, observing that despite the authoritarian character of his rhetoric, the game could encourage some sympathy for him. Leigh Alexander of Gamasutra ranked Ryan third among the publication's five most affecting video game characters of 2007, describing him as a cautionary example of the dangers of uncompromising philosophy. Alexander considered him both sympathetic and profoundly mistaken, and interpreted his willingness to sacrifice his life as the final expression of his commitment to his beliefs.

Ryan also became a focal point for discussion of BioShock's relationship with Ayn Rand and Objectivism. Shortly after the game's release, Wired noted that Ryan's rhetoric closely resembled Rand's radical individualism and reported that the game's depiction of a failed Objectivist society had generated debate among supporters of Rand's philosophy. Kieron Gillen, also writing for Wired, characterized Rapture as an Objectivist social experiment and identified Ryan as the figure through whom the game presents its conflicting claims about individualism, authority and moral choice.

The voice performance of Armin Shimerman as Ryan was also praised. Reviewing the PlayStation 3 version, Nick Waits of TotalPlayStation singled out the performances of Ryan and Atlas as examples of the game's strong voice work.

=== Analysis ===
Ryan's confrontation with Jack, particularly his distinction between a person who chooses and one who obeys, has become a recurring subject in scholarship about BioShock. Stefan Schubert analyzed Ryan as the game's clearest embodiment of Objectivism, arguing that his final scene takes the philosophy's emphasis on individual choice to an extreme. By consciously choosing death while demonstrating that Jack cannot choose whether to kill him, Ryan treats freely chosen death as preferable to survival without autonomy. Schubert also noted that the game removes control from the player during the killing itself, connecting Ryan's philosophical argument to the player's sudden inability to direct Jack's actions. Schubert nevertheless argued that the game ultimately complicates Ryan's binary distinction between freedom and obedience: although the player cannot prevent Ryan's death, other decisions can still affect the game's ending, presenting agency as constrained rather than wholly absent.

Stephanie Jennings found that Ryan's death scene had become unusually influential in subsequent game-studies scholarship. In a meta-synthesis of 59 studies of video-game agency, Jennings found that 15 used BioShock or BioShock Infinite as primary case studies and observed that scholars discussing the original game repeatedly returned to Ryan's revelation of Jack's conditioning and his death as evidence in debates over whether player agency is genuine or illusory. She found that these interpretations disagreed over the degree to which BioShock eliminates meaningful choice, but commonly treated the Ryan confrontation as a critique of the player's presumed freedom within a video game's rules.

Ryan and the scene continued to receive retrospective attention nearly two decades after the game's release. In 2026, Rubén Martínez of MeriStation described Ryan's final confrontation as simultaneously completing the character's ideological arc and exposing the limitations of the player's autonomy: Ryan is able to arrange his death according to his own principles while Jack, and by extension the player, is compelled to carry it out. Martínez considered the scene's combination of characterization and commentary on linear video-game narratives a major reason for its continued recognition.
