= BioShock: The Collection =

2016 video game compilation

- Developer: Blind Squirrel Games (Note: BioShock was developed by 2K Boston and 2K Australia, BioShock 2 by 2K Marin, and BioShock Infinite by Irrational Games.)
- Publisher: 2K
- Series: BioShock
- Platforms: PlayStation 4 Xbox One; Windows macOS; Nintendo Switch
- Release: September 13, 2016: PlayStation 4, Xbox One; NA: September 13, 2016; WW: September 15, 2016; Windows; WW: September 16, 2016; macOS; WW: August 22, 2017; Nintendo Switch; WW: May 29, 2020
- Genre: First-person shooter
- Mode: Single-player

BioShock: The Collection is a 2016 video game compilation developed by Blind Squirrel Games and published by 2K. The Collection features upgraded versions of BioShock (2007), BioShock 2 (2010) and BioShock Infinite (2013), with new textures and support for higher resolution displays and framerates. The compilation was released in September 2016 for PlayStation 4, Xbox One, and Windows; versions for macOS and Nintendo Switch followed in August 2017 and May 2020, respectively.

A remaster of the BioShock series was widely rumored for years before its official announcement. After its release, the game was updated to address bugs and crashes. Critical reception of The Collection was generally positive, with praise focusing on the value of the collection and its appeal for new players of the franchise. Complaints included the relative lack of updates to later games in the collection, and technical performance. The game was a bestselling title in the United States and United Kingdom in its initial months of release.

== Contents ==
BioShock: The Collection contains all three titles in the BioShock series: BioShock, BioShock 2, and BioShock Infinite. The games are first-person shooters, with a focus on story and character customization. Players wield guns and superpower-granting genetic modifications called Plasmids or Vigors. Also included in the collection are the games' single-player content originally released as exclusives or downloadable content packs, including BioShock 2: Minerva's Den and BioShock Infinite: Burial at Sea. The multiplayer component of BioShock 2 is not included. It includes the challenge game modes from all three releases, and the Museum of Orphaned Concepts, a feature from an earlier collection in which the player explores an in-game gallery of abandoned development concepts.

BioShock and BioShock 2 were remastered for the collection, with higher-resolution textures and new effects. The collection adds a director's commentary called Imagining BioShock, featuring the series' creative director Ken Levine and lead artist Shawn Robertson. Players unlock episodes of the commentary by finding new collectible objects added to the remastered BioShock. The remastered games run in 1080p resolution at 60 frames per second on Xbox One and PlayStation 4.

== Development and release ==
Blind Squirrel Games, who previously worked with BioShock series developers Irrational Games on BioShock Infinite, assisted series producer 2K with development of the remastered collection. 2K decided not to remaster the Windows edition of BioShock Infinite, which already met their graphical standards for the updated console editions when using its highest graphical settings. News of the remastered collection leaked from retailers and trademarks several times in advance of its June 2016 announcement.

The collection was released on PlayStation 4 and Xbox One platforms in North America on September 13, 2016, and worldwide two days later, on September 15, 2016. The collection was released for Windows on September 15, 2016, and its remastered versions of BioShock and BioShock 2 were given as upgrades for those who owned the original Windows PC editions. A macOS version published by Feral Interactive released on August 22, 2017. Also produced was a limited run of 450 "Ultra Limited Edition" copies of the game which included an art book, reversible poster, and coin. The Xbox One and PlayStation 4 retail release is spread across 2 discs.

On release, players of the Windows versions noted that the remastered versions of the games retained bugs and removed graphic options without tweaking configuration files. 2K acknowledged issues with the game, and subsequently released a patch in early October 2016 to address a lack of graphics options, crashes, better monitor support and mouse controls.

In 2020, enhancement patches were released to increase the resolution of the games when played on Xbox One X and PlayStation 4 Pro. The patch boosted the resolution of the first two games to 1440p on PS4 Pro and 2160p on Xbox One X, and 1440p for both consoles for Infinite. The collection was also released on the Nintendo Switch in May. It maintains the upgraded assets for the remasters of BioShock and BioShock 2, and runs at 1080p at 30 frames per second when docked, dropping to 720p in portable mode.

== Reception ==
Reception

Aggregate score
Aggregator	Score
Metacritic	PS4: 84/100; XONE: 84/100; PC: 80/100; NS: 84/100

Review scores
Publication	Score
GameRevolution	4/5
IGN	8.2/10
Nintendo Life	8.7/10
VideoGamer.com	8/10

BioShock: The Collection received "generally favorable" reviews according to video game review aggregator website Metacritic, with platform scores between 80 and 84 out of 100. Critics generally recommended the collection for players unfamiliar with the franchise, as well as returning players, though others, such as IGN's Jonathon Dornbush, felt that the collection's appeal to longtime players was less clear.

Game Revolution's Peter Paras praised the updated visuals for the first two games, although they also noted that they felt dated graphically compared to modern games. While reviews generally noted improved performance on most games, others highlighted frame rate inconsistencies that Infinite still suffered from. The games' atmosphere was regarded to have remained intact and effective, beyond the aging of the graphics themselves.

Nintendo Life noted that the earlier game's lack of more recent genre conventions such as aim down sights or sprinting gave them a decidedly "old school" feel that took time to get acclimated to. More critically, Insider Gamer's Derek Taal said that the gameplay of the early games had aged poorly, and occasionally proved frustrating. Dornbush and others lamented that most of the improvements were for the first BioShock and the subsequent titles received less attention. Other criticisms included inconsistent controls between games and audiovisual glitches.

The game was the first best-selling retail video game in the United Kingdom in its week of release in competition with seven other new releases. Sales dropped by 50% in its second week, but it maintained its top position on the charts. It dropped to fourth place the following week, and out of the top 10 games the next. In the United States, the collection was the fifth best-selling title of September according to NPD Group, before dropping out of the top ten the following month.
