= List of BioShock characters =

The BioShock series is a collection of story-driven first-person shooters in which the player explores dystopian settings created by Ken Levine and his team at Irrational Games. The first two games, BioShock and its direct sequel, BioShock 2, take place in the underwater city of Rapture in 1960 and 1968, which was influenced heavily by Ayn Rand's Objectivism. The third installment, BioShock Infinite, is set aboard the floating air-city of Columbia in 1912, designed around the concept of American Exceptionalism. Though Infinite is not a direct sequel to the previous games, the game is thematically linked; a short scene within the core Infinite game returns to Rapture, while the downloadable content BioShock Infinite: Burial at Sea tie in many of the plot elements between BioShock and BioShock Infinite.

As a heavily plot-driven series of games, BioShock contains a long list of non-playable characters (NPC) with which the player interacts and which drive the games' respective stories.

== BioShock ==
=== Jack ===
Jack is the silent protagonist of BioShock, whom the player controls throughout the game. He is first seen aboard an airplane, which crashes near a lighthouse in the middle of the Atlantic Ocean containing a bathysphere terminal providing entry to Rapture. During his journey through Rapture, Jack encounters various gene-altering substances known as Plasmids and Tonics, which he uses to gain powerful abilities to defend himself. Jack experiences strange visions of his family while traveling, but eventually discovers that he is the illegitimate son of Andrew Ryan and singer Jasmine Jolene, "Andrew Ryan's Favorite Girl." After becoming pregnant, Jasmine sold her fertilized egg to Brigid Tenenbaum, an employee of businessman Frank Fontaine. Fontaine arranged for Jack to undergo genetic conditioning so that he would age rapidly and to follow any order given alongside the phrase "would you kindly." Atlas uses that phrase throughout the game to control the main character and his actions.

There are two endings for Jack depending on how many Little Sisters he saved and/or harvested throughout the game. In one ending, he lives out the rest of his life with the Little Sisters he saved; over time, they enjoy rites of passage like graduation, marriage, and having children of their own. At the end of the cutscene, Jack lies on his death bed, holding the hands of several ex-Sisters. (It is implied that Jack dies prematurely because he was genetically engineered to age rapidly.) The other ending shows him seizing control of Rapture and becoming just as power-hungry and destructive as Fontaine, hinting that all the ADAM he gathered has corrupted him into a Splicer. In the second part of the BioShock: Infinite DLC, Burial at Sea, it is revealed that the former ending is canon.

=== Andrew Ryan ===
Andrew Ryan (born Andrei Rianofski) is one of the main antagonists of the Bioshock franchise. He is a business magnate who seeks to avoid scrutiny from governments and other forms of oversight, ordered the secret construction of an underwater city, Rapture, where men and women like himself could be free to achieve greatness on their own terms. When Ryan's vision for a utopia in Rapture collapsed into dystopia, he hides himself away and uses armies of mutated humans known as Splicers to defend himself and fight against those resisting him, including the player-character Jack. Upon meeting Jack face-to-face Ryan orders the mind-controlled assassin to beat him to death with his golf club, dying on his own terms. He is voiced by Armin Shimerman.

=== Atlas/Frank Fontaine ===
Frank Fontaine is the main antagonist in BioShock. He is a criminal mastermind who becomes the arch-enemy of Andrew Ryan as he attempts to seize power over Rapture. He is responsible for igniting the civil war that plunged Rapture into social collapse, as well as Jack's kidnapping as a baby. To escape from Ryan's forces, Fontaine faked his death and later took up the identity of Atlas, posing as the champion of Rapture's lower classes. Ryan feared Atlas' power and initially imprisoned him and his followers in a makeshift prison 2000 fathoms beneath Rapture, but they were able to escape and in 1959 launched an all-out war against Ryan. Atlas serves as Jack's guide for most of the game, luring him towards Ryan under the guise of trying to save his fictitious wife and son that he claimed Ryan had taken hostage. He betrays Jack after the death of Ryan and becomes the game's final boss, using ADAM to attain physical perfection and becoming a blue-skinned humanoid with enhanced abilities. He is killed when a number of freed Little Sisters swarm him and stab him to death with their ADAM needles.

Fontaine, in his Atlas guise, also serves as the main antagonist in Bioshock Infinite: Burial at Sea - Episode Two. In this prequel to BioShock, Atlas captures a Little Sister known as Sally. He forces Elizabeth, who in this reality is a nightclub performer, to find Ryan's chief physician, Dr. Yi Suchong. Elizabeth not only finds him, but also retrieves a canister of "Quantum Particles" that allow Atlas's main base of operations, "Fontaine Department Stores" to rise from its 2000-fathoms depth, promptly igniting the civil war that would destroy Rapture. Atlas then forces Elizabeth to retrieve his "Ace in the Hole", which turned out to be the phrase "Would you kindly...". After retrieving it, he orders his men to send Jack "home" before fatally striking Elizabeth on the head with a wrench, leaving her for dead.

=== Sander Cohen ===
One of the most prominent public figures in Rapture, Sander Cohen presents himself as a musician, filmmaker, artist, poet, and playwright based in Fort Frolic. As a result of Rapture's civil war and the chaotic months that followed, Cohen grew extremely paranoid and violently insane, becoming obsessed with inflicting pain upon others as a way of making sense of the violent world he now inhabited. The Splicers under his domination are often the subjects of Cohen's art "projects", such as being forcibly covered in plaster and paste and turned into statues. He is voiced by T. Ryder Smith.

Cohen also appears in the first chapter of Burial at Sea, where he is confronted in his private club about information on Sally. Cohen is shown painting male and female models dressed as mythological deities, electrocuting those who fail to follow his directions properly while complaining that his art is not appreciated enough. After briefly discussing matters with the protagonists, Cohen instructs them to dance for him before shocking them into unconsciousness and placing them in a bathysphere to Sally's last known location.

=== Brigid Tenenbaum ===
Dr. Brigid Tenenbaum is a geneticist who helped originally develop ADAM. She was originally born near the city of Minsk, Belarus. into a Jewish family with a German father. At the age of 16, she was sent via train to the Auschwitz concentration camp, where she was going to be experimented on by German doctors, notably Josef Mengele. Before Tenenbaum was to be prepared for testing, she observed Mengele and started correcting him, impressing the doctors so much that they allowed her to participate in experiments on other prisoners. At this time Tenenbaum discovered her love for science and due to her participation in the tests, she survived the Holocaust. Tenenbaum is a high-functioning autistic. Her absolute adoration of science and lack of social skills caused her to completely ignore what happened around her, including the horrific experiments she did, which continued into her adult years.

After arriving in Rapture, she had a bit of a struggle to get the recognition she deserved among the best and brightest, until she discovered the Sea Slug, which contained a substance that could replace cells, which led to the discovery of the wonder-drug ADAM, which allowed the citizens of Rapture to manipulate their DNA. With the help of Frank Fontaine, who provided financing to develop the drug, Tenenbaum become known as a scientific genius in the city. Tenenbaum also discovered that by putting the slug into a host, it would produce up to thirty times as much ADAM and the only hosts that proved effective were young girls. While Tenenbaum was the "mother" of the Little Sisters, Dr. Yi Suchong was the creator of the Plasmids. Much like her younger self, Tenenbaum was blind to what she was doing, exploiting little girls for her own scientific purposes. When the Little Sisters were first created, she had no regard for them or their lives, seeing the removal of the slugs as no different from removing life support from a terminal patient. Soon before the Rapture Civil War, Tenenbaum's maternal instincts were awoken, causing her to leave her Mercury Suites apartment and life to reside in the sewers of the abandoned residential complex Olympus Heights. Here Tenenbaum began rescuing Little Sisters via a Plasmid she developed, as she felt that they were her responsibility and began to care a great deal about their safety, calling them "little ones"; in return, they call her "Mama Tenenbaum". Tenenbaum was able to survive the fall of Rapture and continued to save Little Sisters in her hiding place.

During the events of BioShock, while in the Medical Pavilion, Jack approaches a lounge in the Surgery wing and sees a Big Daddy being killed by Splicers and thrown through a window. This Big Daddy was protecting a Little Sister, which now is left alone with the remaining Splicer. Just as the Splicer is about to strike the Little Sister, Tenenbaum emerges and shoots him. Tenenbaum warns Jack not to hurt her, while Atlas encourages him to harvest the Sister to get ADAM. When Tenenbaum questions Jack's morality, Atlas accuses her of hypocrisy, as she's the one that turned the girls into Little Sisters. While Atlas tries to convince Jack to kill the girl, Tenenbaum presents an alternative: a Plasmid that would safely remove the Sea Slug from the girls. The following events gives the player a choice of harvesting the Little Sisters or saving them with Tenenbaum's Plasmid. From this point on, Tenenbaum's perception of Jack is up to the player. If Jack saves the Sisters, Tenenbaum will show her gratitude to him by providing an ADAM gift for him after every third Sister he saves and an overall good attitude towards him. If Jack harvests the Sisters, he will not be granted gifts and she will repeatedly express her anger towards him. After the Andrew Ryan confrontation and reveal of Atlas' true identity in Hephaestus, Tenenbaum sends Little Sisters to save Jack from the hands of Fontaine by leading him into a vent, where Jack falls and blacks out. Jack wakes up in Tenenbaum's safehouse and finds that she has undone the "Would you kindly?" mind control conditioning that Atlas had exploited. Tenenbaum can be seen behind glass in an office in the safehouse, smoking and explaining to Jack what has occurred and what he should do next. After this, she serves as Jack's guide throughout the final third of the game and provides the narration during the final scene (which is affected by Jack's choice to save or harvest the Sisters). Sometime after the events of the first game, Tenenbaum leaves Rapture with an undisclosed amount of Little Sisters.

During the events of BioShock 2, eight years later, she returns to Rapture to rescue the last of the Little Sisters and find the cure for Splicing. She contacts Subject Delta during the beginning and guides him through the first two levels before being replaced by Augustus Sinclair, as she needs to help others, such as Charles Milton Porter. She is voiced by Anne Bobby.

Brigid Tenenbaum's personality and back story were largely developed by Ken Levine, who wanted a believable and flawed human which was managed with the combinations of her medical condition, ethnic background, and overall circumstances. Levine felt that her core characteristics - being a woman, autistic and Jewish - were not what defined her, but 'her absolute adoration of science' was what ultimately did. Up until the development of BioShock 2, her name was spelled "Bridgette" instead of "Brigid". Her in-game Audio Diary portrait for BioShock was based on a photo of actress Geraldine Fitzgerald.

=== Yi Suchong ===
Dr. Yi Suchong is a medical doctor and survivor of the Japanese occupation of China during World War II who came to Rapture and set up an independent research lab to help exploit the resources offered by Ryan for financial gain. Suchong saw the possibilities of Dr. Tenenbaum's discovery of ADAM, and devised the means of using ADAM to create plasmids and other technological wonders. He is also credited with creating the Big Daddies to help protect Tenenbaum's Little Sisters at Ryan's insistence. Though initially neutral in the feud between Ryan and Fontaine, Suchong became dissatisfied with Ryan's leadership and secretly offers his services to Fontaine. Suchong was part of Fontaine's project to create Jack, Fontaine's "ace in the hole". Suchong conditioned a rapidly growing Jack with psychological triggers, including the phrase "would you kindly" before Jack was smuggled back to the surface, but was not able to give this information to Fontaine. Within BioShock, Suchong is already dead, though Jack discovers Suchong's name in various recordings. In Burial At Sea Episode Two, which takes place a year before BioShock, Suchong is still alive and shown to have been able to use tears in the fabric of reality to communicate with Jeremiah Fink in Columbia, the two sharing their research data for the betterment of both cities, though remaining cautious of the each other's motives. Elizabeth witnesses Suchong being killed by a Big Daddy after he strikes a Little Sister in its presence, and finds Suchong's notes about Jack, which she delivers to Atlas (Fontaine) for him to utilize the 'ace in the hole'. He is voiced by James Yaegashi.

=== J.S. Steinman ===
Dr. J.S. Steinman is Jewish American and one of Rapture's most accomplished plastic surgeons, establishing a lucrative practice based on his insistence that everyone in Rapture should be beautiful. After ADAM was introduced, Steinman started to become bored as ADAM provided almost no boundaries but he was restricted to the requests of the customers, who he came to regard as boring and bland. When overuse of ADAM started to take a toll on his mind, he started to mutilate his patients and, becoming insane, began having hallucinations of Aphrodite, the Greek goddess of beauty. He is eventually killed by Jack. He is voiced by Peter Francis James.

=== Peach Wilkins ===
Peach Wilkins was one of Frank Fontaine's chief smugglers, running trips to the surface and Rapture for money. When Andrew Ryan's forces started to shut down smuggling operations, Fontaine demanded 80% cuts of pay from his smugglers and would kill anyone who tried to oppose him, or join Andrew Ryan's side. Peach becomes extremely paranoid of Fontaine, leading to him isolating himself in the abandoned Fontaine Fisheries building. Even after Fontaine's presumed death, he believed that Fontaine was still alive and hunting him down. In Bioshock, he guards the way to Smuggler's Hideout, which is where Atlas' family is. He eventually lets Jack into the Fisheries, only to trap him, suspecting he was working for Fontaine. Jack kills Peach and heads to the hideout. Peach's suspicions are confirmed when Atlas reveals himself as Frank Fontaine. He is voiced by Michael Villani.

== BioShock 2 ==
=== Subject Delta ===
Subject Delta is the silent protagonist of BioShock 2. Originally known as "Johnny Topside", he discovered Rapture in a diving bell and was arrested for illegally making contact with its inhabitants. After being sent to prison, Delta became the first successful Big Daddy subject bonded to a Little Sister, Eleanor Lamb. This bond was capable of killing Delta if it were to be broken, which is what happened on New Year's Eve 1958 when Dr. Sofia Lamb forced (via plasmid) Delta to commit suicide with the use of a pistol, reclaiming her daughter. Ten years later, in 1968, Delta is revived by the now adolescent Eleanor Lamb with the use of a vita-chamber reprogrammed to his DNA. Delta is required to find Eleanor, thus repairing the bond between the two. He is part of the Alpha series of Big Daddies.

=== Augustus Sinclair ===
Augustus Sinclair, Esq. is Subject Delta's guide through Rapture. He was the creator of Persephone, a private prison housing Andrew Ryan's enemies, doubling as the headquarters of his technology firm Sinclair Solutions. During Rapture's height Sinclair Solutions was one of the city's most successful businesses, thanks to his strong links to Andrew Ryan. Towards the end of BioShock 2, Sofia Lamb captures Sinclair and transforms him into the last of the Alpha Series, Subject Omega, whom Subject Delta must kill to gain access to the submersible to exit Rapture. He is voiced by Doug Boyd.

=== Eleanor Lamb ===
The daughter of Sofia Lamb, and a previous Little Sister. Roughly ten years after the 1958 New Year's Eve Riots, she contacts Subject Delta, beginning the events of BioShock 2. Eleanor still remembers Delta as her "Father" after ten years and knows he is searching for her. Throughout the course of the game, she will leave him gifts and messages written on the walls of the city. In the story of BioShock 2, her behavior is influenced by Delta's actions towards the Little Sisters and NPCs, culminating in her donning a Big Sister Suit so she can fight alongside him. She is voiced by Sydney Unseth and Sarah Bolger.

=== Sofia Lamb ===
Dr. Sofia Lamb is the main antagonist of BioShock 2. She has taken over Andrew Ryan's position as the leader of Rapture, albeit with a completely different ideological view revolving around collectivism. Hoping to restore the city as a utopia centered around her daughter Eleanor, she uses her skills as a psychiatrist to brainwash most of the remaining Splicers in the city, forming a cult known as "The Rapture Family". She sends out members of The Family to prevent Subject Delta from reuniting with Eleanor, and even tries to smother her daughter to kill him. At the end of the game, she is either rescued or drowned by Eleanor, who has come to resent her abusive mother. She is voiced by Fenella Woolgar.

In 2013, Liz Lanier of Game Informer included Lamb among top ten female villains in video games, stating that "an extremist obsessed with the "greater good," Lamb will sacrifice anything and anyone for her own agenda; whether that means brainwashing or murdering to create her utopia, she's down."

=== Charles Milton Porter/Subject Sigma ===
Previously known as Charles Milton Porter, Subject Sigma is the protagonist of Minerva's Den. When he was Charles Milton Porter, his partner Reed Wahl framed him as an associate of Fontaine to gain full control of their creation, the Thinker. Ryan had Porter arrested and converted him to an Alpha Series Big Daddy. With no Little Sister available to be bonded with him, he was sent into cold storage. Brigid Tenenbaum revived him in 1968 with no memory of his previous life and restores his free will. Tasked with bringing the Thinker's code to the surface, Sigma is rewarded by being restored to his original self and given back his memories. He is voiced by actor Carl Lumbly.

=== The Thinker ===
The Thinker is an early supercomputer that is able to control Rapture's security system and predict events at "the speed of thought". It is located in Rapture Central Computing, a location at the heart of Minerva's Den. Wahl misused the Thinker to enrich himself by predicting sport scores and stock prices, while Porter tried to use it to replicate the mind of his deceased wife Pearl. Reed's addiction to Plasmids fueled an unhealthy obsession with the Thinker, and he manipulated it to frame Porter as one of Fontaine's spies, leading to his downfall. But unbeknownst to Wahl, the Thinker replicated Porter's personality and helped free him from storage. It now seeks to aid its creator (now known as Subject Sigma) on his mission to bring him and itself out of the rapidly flooding facility.

=== Reed Wahl ===
Reed Wahl is the main antagonist of Minerva's Den. Alongside Charles Porter, Wahl was responsible for creating the Thinker. Unlike his partner, who had no desire to profit from his creation, Wahl took advantage of the Thinker's capabilities by using it to manipulate the stock market and place huge sport bets. He also began to abuse plasmids, which warped his mind until he became convinced that the Thinker was capable of solving an unproven concept called the "Predictive Equation", the potential of which would solve countless mysteries of the universe. Wahl tricks Ryan into arresting Porter, then takes control of the Splicers in Rapture Central Computing, using them to protect the Thinker — until Porter, turned into a Big Daddy after his arrest, kills him in battle towards the end of the DLC. He is voiced by Keith Szarabajka.

== BioShock Infinite ==
=== Booker DeWitt ===
Booker DeWitt (Troy Baker, Stephen Russell in the early demo), the player protagonist, is a disgraced former agent of the Pinkerton National Detective Agency. As a soldier in the 7th Cavalry Regiment, he had performed brutal acts against native American Indians at the Battle of Wounded Knee to impress his fellow soldiers, and earned him the title "White Injun" due to his tendency to scalp those he killed. These acts left him emotionally scarred, leading to excessive drinking and gambling. He was given an opportunity to be baptized and start anew, but declined. He was later dismissed for behavior beyond the acceptable bounds of the Pinkerton Agency, but considers his actions in quelling labor strikes as part of a goon squad to be among his many sins. He continued to work as a private investigator from New York City, referring to himself as an "independent contractor". His gambling addiction ultimately catches Booker in a debt to unknown, dangerous individuals, leading to his journey to Columbia. Outwardly, he cares little for the extraordinary, provided that it does not interfere with his ability to do his job; internally, he is disturbed by both his role in the events at Wounded Knee and recurring visions of New York City under attack from the air. Booker is skeptical of faith, unwilling to accept the idea that he can be absolved of his sins by embracing religion, as he considers his sins to be so extreme as to demand a penance rather than forgiveness.

It is revealed in the game's climax that Booker is the father of Elizabeth (who was originally named Anna). Comstock, having gone sterile and desiring an heir, had the Luteces persuade Booker in 1893 to give her to them, in exchange for his debt being paid. Booker later regretted his decision, and attempted to stop Comstock and the Luteces as they left through a portal. In the struggle, Anna's finger was severed as the portal closed. The Luteces later contacted Booker and offered to bring him to Comstock's reality and stop him after he betrayed them. Booker accepted this, but the effects of inter-dimensional travel caused his memory to confuse finding Elizabeth with giving away Anna. Elizabeth takes Booker to the river where the baptism was supposed to occur, adding that while he rejected it, another Booker in a different reality accepted it and became Comstock. She (and other Elizabeths from different realities) concludes that the only way to prevent Comstock from being born is to "drown" Booker, which he accepts. He is then "drowned" in the river. In the post-credits scene, a Booker (it is unclear if this is the one played through the game or one from a different reality) awakens in his home in 1893. He goes into Anna's room, but what he finds is left unknown. It is revealed in Burial at Sea that another Comstock fled to Rapture using Booker's identity, but is killed by Elizabeth. An imaginary version of Booker later speaks to Elizabeth in her head, guiding her through Rapture.

Troy Baker was praised for his performance as Booker. At the 2013 Spike VGX, his role as Booker was nominated for Best Voice Actor; he ultimately won the award for his role as Joel in The Last of Us.

=== Elizabeth ===
Elizabeth (Courtnee Draper) is a young woman who has been held captive in Columbia for most of her life. She is shown to be highly intelligent, having spent most of her life studying a wide variety of subjects from geography to medicine and physics, whilst acquiring more practical skills in the form of cryptography and lock-picking. She also has the ability to perceive and interact with the dimensional tears across Columbia. She wears a thimble in place of the tip of her little finger, which had been cut off, though she does not remember how this happened. In one point of the game, the Twins will let Booker choose what type of brooch necklace she should wear (a Bird or a Cage), which will not affect the story. It is later revealed that she is really Anna DeWitt, Booker's daughter, whom Comstock kidnapped across dimensions. Her finger was severed when the portal Comstock kidnapped her with closed on it and cut it off. She is the only main character alive at the end of the game (as all the other hypothetical Elizabeths and Annas vanished from existence). She reappears in the Burial at Sea DLC, having assumed a new identity as a singer known as the "Songbird of Rapture", hunting down the final Comstock who escaped Booker's sacrifice. After exacting revenge on this Comstock, she becomes overburdened with guilt over her mistreatment of a little sister, which compels her to return to Rapture at the cost of her powers. After being forced by Atlas to help him escape prison, Elizabeth returns to Columbia to find a Lutece particle to help raise the prison. Along the way, she discovers connections and resolutions to questions from Infinite. She is later ordered to retrieve Atlas' "Ace in the Hole". After reluctantly giving it to Atlas, she is then bludgeoned to death with a wrench. Before she dies, she is able to foresee the future where Jack saves the little sisters and they escape Rapture. This knowledge brings Elizabeth peace in her final moments.

=== The Songbird ===
Elizabeth's confinement within Columbia has been maintained by the Songbird, a large, robotic bird-like creature who had been both her friend, protector and her warden. The Songbird was designed by its creator to feel betrayal should Elizabeth escape, and Elizabeth notes she "would rather be killed than be recaptured by it." Similar to a Big Daddy (upon which the technology used in its creation may have been based) its eyes can also turn into three different colors: green, yellow and red

=== Zachary Hale Comstock ===
Father Zachary Hale Comstock (Kiff VandenHeuvel) is the main antagonist of BioShock Infinite. He is revealed to be an alternate version of Booker DeWitt; whereas Booker refused the baptism after the Battle of Wounded Knee, this version accepted it, found faith in religion, and renamed himself as Comstock. Claiming to have received a vision of the future from an archangel, Comstock became a religious fanatic who founded Columbia with the help of the Luteces, and is revered there as "The Prophet".

Initially, Comstock intended Columbia to promote American exceptionalism to the world, but tensions emerged with President William McKinley. This boiled over in 1901, when Comstock ordered a violent attack on Peking during the Boxer Rebellion. The government demanded he return to the United States, but Comstock seceded Columbia, and became its de facto ruler.

Now in complete control of Columbia, Comstock created a religion that Ken Levine described as being a hybrid of Christianity and the worship of the Founding Fathers as religious figures. At the same time, he eschews figures like Abraham Lincoln, considering him to be a "devil" that led America astray when he freed the African slaves; in one area of the game, the player encounters a cult-like group that reveres John Wilkes Booth as a hero. To maintain his leadership, Comstock has created a cult of personality and police state within Columbia, which also protects his secrets by weaving them into the mythology he has created. Under his leadership, Columbia exists with nativist and ultra nationalistic attitudes, with minority groups subject to seizure of assets, false imprisonment and penal labor, torture and summary execution without charge. Although Comstock's acknowledgement of these as crimes is never shown, he himself is revealed to be responsible for at least three murders and leading a violent purge of over forty dissidents.

Comstock claims that Elizabeth is his daughter, born miraculously to his late wife, Lady Comstock, after only seven days in the womb, and that she is "The Lamb" that will lead Columbia and attack the world (which he and his followers disdainfully refer to as "the Sodom below") in the future. He apparently believes this will "prepare" the world for the "coming of the Lord". It is later revealed that he had become sterile from the 'Tear' technology used by the Lutece twins, and he employed them to take Anna DeWitt, Booker's child, from another reality to become Elizabeth and his genetic heir to Columbia. He subsequently killed his wife and attempted to kill the Lutece twins to hide this conspiracy. He is killed in the garden room of his airship, The Hand of the Prophet, after proudly declaring "It is finished". Booker smashes his skull in on a baptismal font and drowns him in it.

An alternate version of Comstock (voiced by Troy Baker) also serves as the protagonist for the first part of the Burial at Sea DLC. After the baby Anna was killed when the dimensional portal (which in the main game only severed her finger) decapitated her, Comstock left his Columbia for Rapture to forget his guilt and grief and returned to being Booker DeWitt. There he unofficially adopted a Little Sister named Sally, and was later hired by a version of Elizabeth to find her. This was revealed to be a test to see if this version of Comstock had changed his ways, and when it became apparent that he had not, Elizabeth had the Big Daddy they were fighting impale Comstock from behind and kill him for good.

Comstock's name is possibly derived from Anthony Comstock, an early 20th century conservative politician known for his anti-obscenity Comstock laws.

=== Daisy Fitzroy ===
Daisy Fitzroy (Kimberly Brooks) is the leader of the Vox Populi. A woman of African-American descent, she originally journeyed to Columbia to find a new life, and took a position as housekeeper in Comstock's mansion. When Comstock murdered his wife to keep Elizabeth's parentage secret, he turned Fitzroy into a scapegoat for the crime and framed the Vox Populi, a group of dissidents, as having ordered the murder in order to create a common enemy to justify the establishment of a police state. This inspired Fitzroy to develop a bitter hatred of the Founders and what they stand for, and she assumed control of the Vox Populi, transforming them into a violent band of extremists. Despite fighting against the injustices perpetrated by the Founders, Daisy and the Vox Populi are presented as being no better than the Founders, given the lengths they are willing to go to in order to overthrow Comstock, including murdering innocent civilians, using child soldiers for psychological warfare, and Fitzroy's propaganda which calls for the seizure of property and wealth belonging to the Founders and the deaths of their families. After staging a successful uprising at the factory of Jeremiah Fink (for which Elizabeth bore some responsibility), she shoots him and attempts to do the same to his son, forcing Elizabeth to stab her through the chest with a pair of shears. In Episode 2 of Burial at Sea, it is revealed that these events were orchestrated by the Lutece twins; they convinced Daisy to take the child to help Elizabeth learn to make hard decisions after revealing that she would not have survived long after the rebellion anyway. Recordings left by Daisy explain that she was increasingly disturbed by the violence perpetuated by her followers, and was unsure as to whether or not she could truly build a better society for Columbia's downtrodden.

=== The Lutece Twins ===
Robert (Oliver Vaquer) and Rosalind Lutece (Jennifer Hale) are two mysterious individuals that direct Booker to Columbia and appear throughout his travels. They appear to be near-identical fraternal twins, but it is later revealed that they are the same person from two different realities, differing by sex as well as core ideals. This causes them to disagree about certain theories, such as the effects of one person being introduced into a dimension other than their own. Rosalind is shown to be the one to have developed the technology that keeps Columbia afloat under Comstock's orders, and through that, made contact with Robert. Together they worked out how to communicate with and subsequently cross between dimensions to the extent where they can now do so at will. Over the course of the story, it is revealed that Comstock attempted to murder the Lutece twins by sabotaging one of their devices to protect his secrets, but instead they ended up in a state of flux, existing along the entire "possibility space".

=== Lady Comstock ===
Lady Annabelle Comstock (Laura Bailey) is married to Zachary Hale Comstock and the adoptive mother of Elizabeth. Shortly after meeting Comstock, she became one of his most dedicated followers, but soon became disillusioned when Comstock resorted to increasingly violent tactics to impose his will on the city of Columbia. She grew to resent Elizabeth, and as she grew evermore unstable, she was unable to keep the secret of Elizabeth's parentage and threatened to undermine Comstock's rule over Columbia. Comstock murdered her and blamed Daisy Fitzroy and the Vox Populi for her death, using the act to further establish control over the city by portraying his late wife as a saint to be worshipped by Columbia's citizens. Lady Comstock is eventually resurrected using Elizabeth's powers by Comstock, becoming the "Siren", a being of hate and rage who has the ability to raise the dead to do her bidding. She attempts to kill Elizabeth several times until she convinces her that they are both Comstock's victims, which convinces her to renounce her power and dissipate.

=== Jeremiah Fink ===
Jeremiah Fink (Bill Lobley) is an unscrupulous businessman who has a monopoly over manufacturing in Columbia, aided by usurping technology that he has observed through the tears, including that of the Songbird. Fink is a key supporter of Comstock as he is willing to allow him to exploit Columbia's poor for cheap labor, as well as bring in black workers to provide unpaid labor though he does not share Comstock's religious fervor and generally seems only interested in profit. He has achieved a celebrity status within Columbia, and produces most of the propaganda and weapons used to enforce Comstock's rule over the city. He also guided Albert, his brother and a struggling composer, to take music heard through the tears and claim it as his own. He is ultimately killed by Daisy Fitzroy when she instigates a revolt at his factory. In Burial at Sea, it is shown that Fink and Suchong shared data and research through a tear linking Rapture and Columbia, Fink had also started underwater expeditions in the Atlantic ocean for ADAM slugs to create his own product Vigors, however unlike Rapture's addictive Plasmids, they don't cause deformities or make their consumer insane.

=== Cornelius Slate ===
Cornelius Slate (Keith Szarabajka) is a former soldier who dons a gold eyepatch over his missing left eye. He fought alongside Booker at the Battle of Wounded Knee before becoming a follower of Comstock and going on to lead Columbia's forces to lay waste to Peking during the Boxer Rebellion. Slate becomes disillusioned with Comstock's rule when he discovers that Comstock has claimed both Slate's and Booker's achievements in battle as his own, and organizes a rebellion of other disgruntled veterans against the city. After Booker defeats his followers, he demands that his old war comrade to kill him rather than die at the hands of Comstock's "tin soldiers"; if Booker refuses, he is ultimately taken into custody and winds up reliant on a wheelchair, locked in a remote prison in a catatonic state (possibly by lobotomization). When Elizabeth opens a tear to another reality where Booker died fighting for the Vox Populi, it is revealed that Slate had convinced him to join his rebellion, before being killed in a shootout with the Columbian army.
