= BioShock: Rapture =

2011 novel by John Shirley

- Author: John Shirley
- Cover artist: Craig Mullins
- Language: English
- Series: BioShock
- Genre: Science fiction,
- Publisher: Tor Books (USA); Titan Books (UK)
- Publication date: July 19, 2011
- Publication place: United States; United Kingdom
- Media type: Print (Paperback); Print (Hardcover)
- Pages: 430
- ISBN: 978-1-84856-702-3

BioShock: Rapture is a 2011 science fiction novel written by John Shirley, published by Tor Books in the United States and by Titan Books in the United Kingdom. Rapture forms part of the BioShock retrofuturistic media franchise created by Ken Levine and published by 2K Games and developed by several studios, including Irrational Games and 2K Marin. A prequel to the first BioShock game the novel tells the story of how Andrew Ryan founded the underwater city of Rapture. The book follows multiple BioShock characters. The cover art was designed by Craig Mullins, who also produced the cover art for BioShock 2. It was released July 19, 2011.

== Development ==
The novel was made public on July 17, 2009 when Levine was interviewed by Gamasutra. Rapture was originally planned to coincide with the release of BioShock 2 in February 2010. The delay in publication was due to Shirley having to work in the story and elements from BioShock 2 and to get them approved by Levine. In January 2011, the release date was announced as March 1, 2011. One month later, the date was delayed to July 19, 2011. A French translation by Cédric Degottex was released February 17, 2016 published by Bragelonne. A Turkish translation by Kerem Ergener, and published by Ithaki Publishing, was released in 2016.

== Reception ==
Ian Hunter, writing for the British Fantasy Society, described the book as "essential" for fans of the Bioshock games. Joe Martin, writing for Bit-Tech, called the first third of the book an "uphill struggle" but overall described the novel as "fundamentally decent".
