= BioShock 2: Minerva's Den =

2010 video game downloadable content

- Developer: 2K Marin
- Publisher: 2K
- Designer: Steve Gaynor
- Programmer: Jeff Fisher
- Artist: Devin St. Clair
- Writer: Steve Gaynor
- Series: BioShock
- Engine: Unreal Engine 2.5
- Platforms: PlayStation 3; Xbox 360; Windows; Mac OS X; PlayStation 4; Xbox One; Nintendo Switch
- Release: August 31, 2010: PlayStation 3, Xbox 360; WW: August 31, 2010 Windows; WW: May 31, 2011 Mac OS X; WW: March 29, 2012 PlayStation 4, Xbox One; NA: September 13, 2016; WW: September 16, 2016
- Genre: First-person shooter
- Mode: Single-player

BioShock 2: Minerva's Den is a downloadable content (DLC) campaign for the 2010 first-person shooter game BioShock 2, developed by 2K Marin and published by 2K. The single player assumes the role of Subject Sigma, an armored and genetically modified human, or "Big Daddy"; Sigma must travel through Minerva's Den, the technological hub of the underwater city of Rapture, to download a schematic of the city's supercomputer. Gameplay is similar to that of BioShock 2, with new enemies and weapons.

Minerva's Den was created by a small team within 2K Marin led by Steve Gaynor, who partly based the setting on ideas he discussed in his hiring interview. The team decided upon a small, personal story about identity and free will, which explores a previously unseen part of the underwater city of Rapture. Minerva's Den was initially released for PlayStation 3 and Xbox 360 consoles in August 2010, and was later released and reissued on other platforms. It was well received by critics, who praised its story, characters, and gameplay; reviewers, including those writing for Kotaku and Paste, considered it one of the best video game expansions of all time. The experience of creating a small, story-focused project inspired Gaynor and other 2K employees to form The Fullbright Company and create Gone Home (2013).

== Gameplay ==
Like BioShock 2, Minerva's Den is a first-person shooter game. The story takes place in the underwater city of Rapture in 1968, eight years after the events of BioShock and concurrent with the events of BioShock 2's story mode, in the technological district of Minerva's Den. The player character, Subject Sigma, is a Big Daddy, a person fused with an armored diving suit. The player must work with the scientist Charles Milton Porter to acquire the plans of his creation, a supercomputer known as the Thinker, and escape Rapture. Opposing the player are enemies known as splicers—Rapture's residents who overused genetic modifications—along with other Big Daddies and automated security. The game can be completed in between three and five hours.

The gameplay of Minerva's Den is similar to that of BioShock 2. The player uses similar weapons and plasmids (genetic modifications that grant superpowers) but obtains them in a different order, with an increased emphasis on hacking security. The expansion adds new items, including the Ion Lance, a laser weapon wielded by Minerva's Den's Lancer Big Daddies, and the Gravity Well plasmid, which stuns and pulls enemies towards a vortex. New enemies include security robots armed with rockets or laser weapons, flame-wielding Brute Splicers, and ice-throwing Houdini Splicers.

== Plot ==
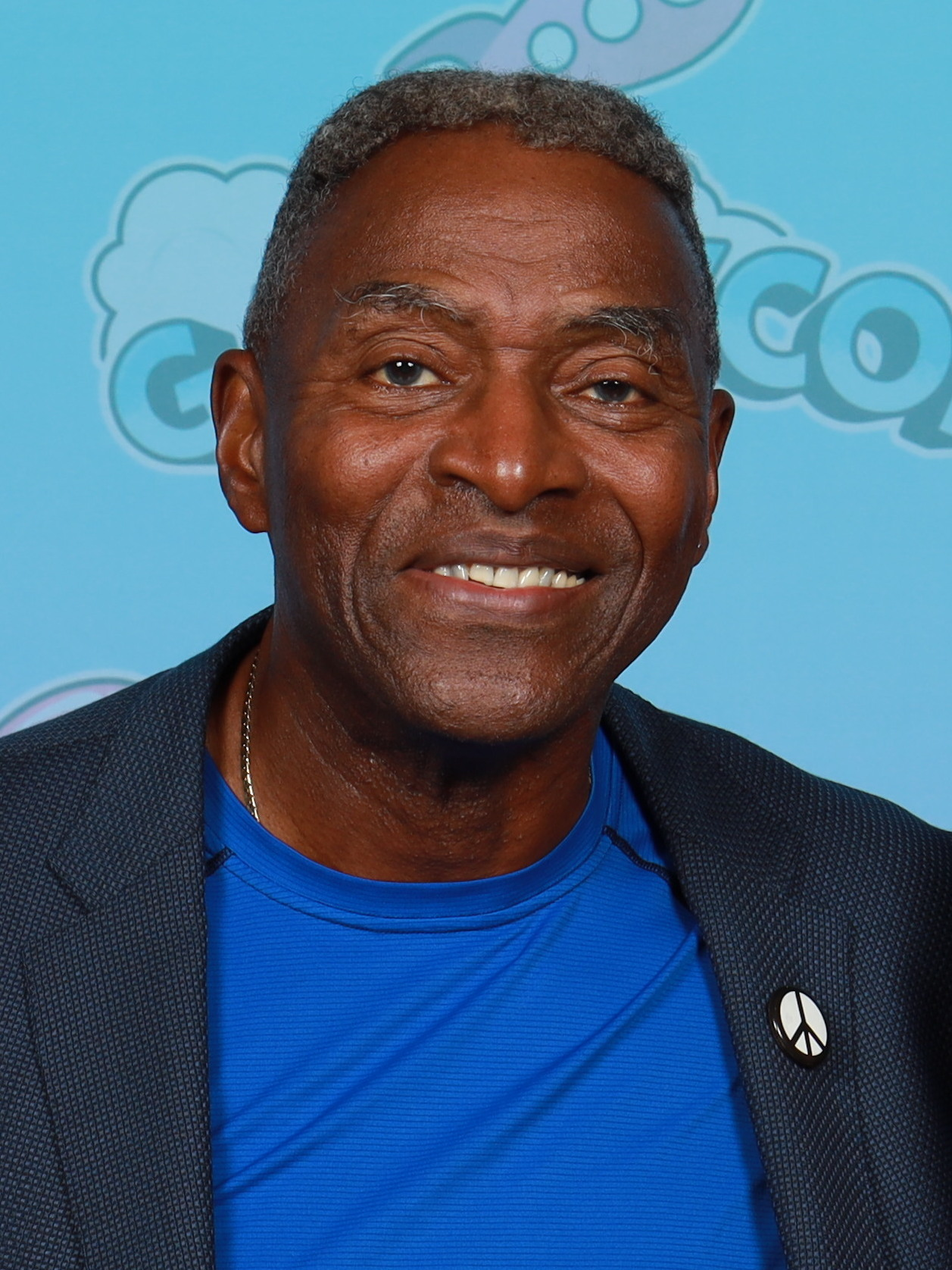
Carl Lumbly at GalaxyCon Richmond in 2025

Subject Sigma is guided by the voice of Charles Milton Porter (Carl Lumbly) as he approaches Minerva's Den, Rapture's central computer core. Porter wants to reach his supercomputer, the Thinker, to retrieve its blueprints so he can recreate it on the surface. Sigma is opposed by Porter's former colleague Reed Wahl, whom Porter warns has become insane from splicing and his obsession with the Thinker. After becoming disillusioned with his role in World War II and the loss of his wife Pearl in The Blitz, Porter traveled to Rapture to pursue his dreams of creating artificial intelligence. While initially working together, Porter and Wahl each wanted to use the Thinker for their own ends. Porter attempted to recreate Pearl by emulating her personality with the Thinker, while Wahl believed he could program the computer to predict the future. Wahl betrayed Porter to Rapture's secret police to keep the Thinker for himself. Minerva's Den has been cut off from the rest of Rapture, and its scientists, who have taken to splicing, attack Sigma.

As Sigma progresses, the environment becomes increasingly threatening due to the Thinker's sophisticated defense system and interference from Wahl and his forces. Sigma reaches the Thinker's core where he confronts and kills Wahl. Sampling Sigma's DNA to print out its schematics, the Thinker reveals Sigma's true identity as Porter, who was turned into a Big Daddy after being handed over to Rapture's authorities. Porter's "instructions" throughout the game actually came from the Thinker, imitating the voice of one of its creators. The final sequence of the game contains no combat; the player walks through Porter's living quarters, where he obsessed over digitally recreating his wife. Sigma and the scientist Brigid Tenenbaum return to the surface in a bathysphere; Tenenbaum is able to undo Sigma's programming and restore Porter's original human body. Porter visits his wife's grave and leaves a letter in which he apologizes for trying to bring her back using the Thinker, and says he has decided to let her go.

== Development ==
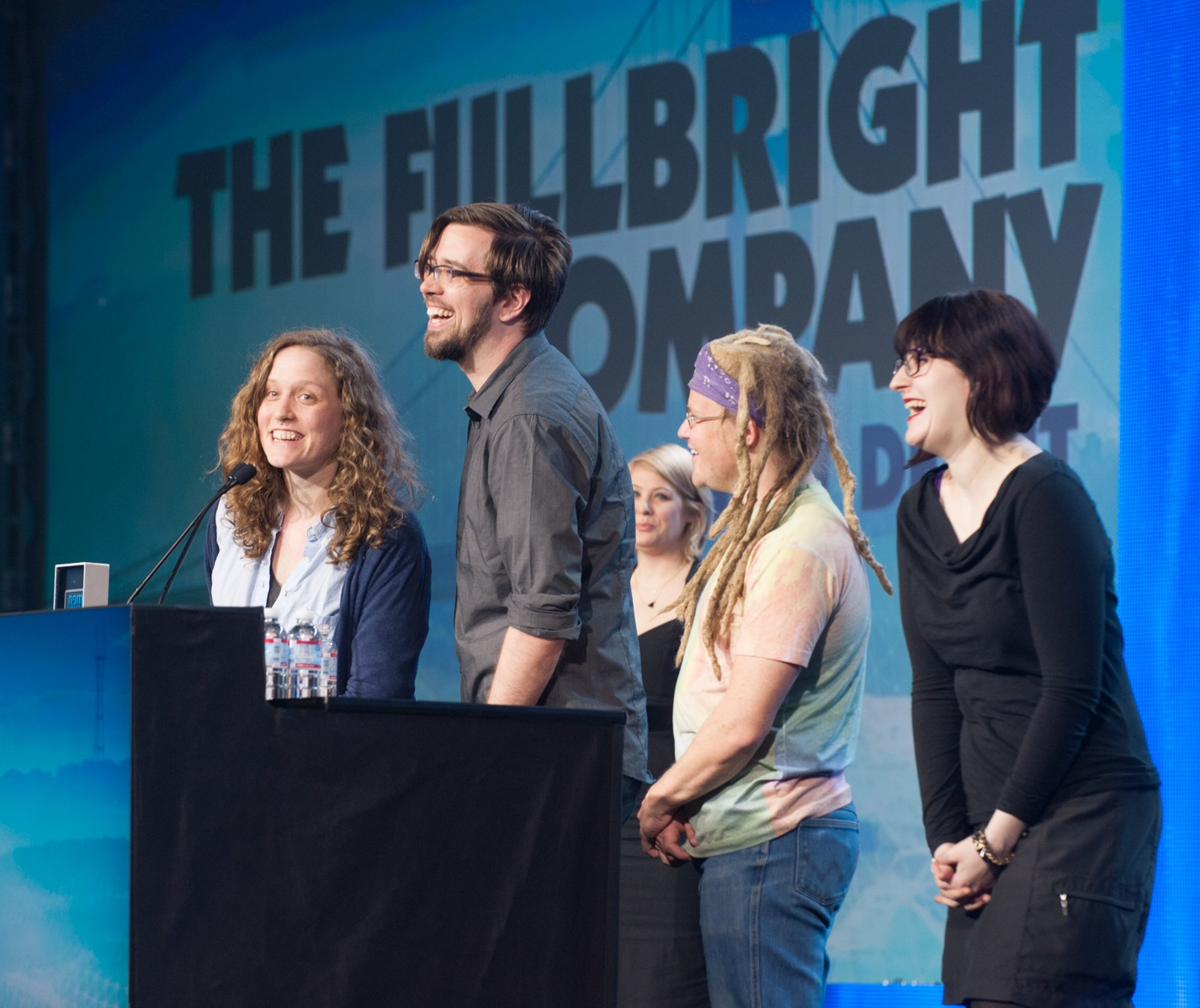
Steve Gaynor (second from left), Johnnemann Nordhagen (third) and Karla Zimonja (fourth) were members of the team that developed Minerva's Den.

Development of the Minerva's Den downloadable content (DLC) began after the completion of BioShock 2. Steve Gaynor and a team of nine other full-time workers were tasked with creating a three-to-five-hour, single-player experience; Gaynor served as lead designer and writer, having worked as a level designer for BioShock 2 and on story elements such as dialogue and audio diaries—scattered logs that reveal backstory while players explore, Devin St. Clair as lead artist and Jeff Fisher as lead programmer. The names of the development team were given to slugs scattered around the game's levels as an Easter egg. The development team were limited in what form the DLC could take and had to reuse as many assets as possible; Gaynor recalled the constraints of limited time and resources was a blessing in disguise. Though many companies would treat DLC as a "cash grab" with less development time and lowered expectations, Gaynor felt these constraints also enabled more creative risks to be taken. With such a small team, the staff collaborated without remaining in segregated roles; according to Gaynor, "It has to be organic as possible, and when someone has something that's not necessarily their primary responsibility but they have a passion for it and ideas for it ... I think you have to take advantage of that".

While being interviewed for his job at 2K Marin, Gaynor had been asked to propose a potential BioShock level. Gaynor recalled suggesting a story focusing on Rapture's computer core and a character splicing to become more intelligent. During BioShock 2's development, the level designers suggested the possibility that technology from Rapture created a primitive artificial intelligence (A.I.) that would lead to the development of SHODAN, an A.I. that appears in the video game System Shock. When developing ideas for what would become Minerva's Den, Gaynor suggested merging the ideas, using a story about Rapture's computer core and a "steampunk" A.I., drawing from SHODAN's multiple identities and impersonations. Gaynor wanted the content to fit both the world of BioShock and the historical era in which it takes place. When the developers decided to focus on Rapture's computer technology, they based it on the early computing age spurred by work done during World War II, including the work of Alan Turing and the cryptographers at Bletchley Park. Gaynor reasoned that Rapture advanced using genetic technology, but the residents of Rapture explored other technological dead ends, including areas devoted to robotics and automation in Minerva's Den.

Contrasting the long development and narrative of the main game with those of Minerva's Den, Gaynor said that he enjoyed the opportunity to tell a shorter story where players understood the characters. According to Gaynor:

We could take the themes of BioShock that are native to Rapture and make them relevant to the specific fiction of Minerva's Den. When you have a super computer that can do a million calculations a second, how does that fit into the ideas of free will and predestination and fate, and choice, that BioShock is built on?

Gaynor wanted to adapt the grand themes of BioShock to tell a different story about loss and changing the past that focused on a single character, Porter, who forms the "heart" of the game. Gaynor felt the final gameplay sequence, in which the player walks through Porter's living space, was important to give players time to reflect on the character's journey. He resisted calls to make the interesting environment a place for combat.

To prevent players of BioShock 2 from feeling Minerva's Den's gameplay was repetitive, 2K Marin tried to present a different experience within the narrative's constraints. Shadowy level design and more dangerous enemies were crafted to give a subtle survival horror feel; the team also adjusted the order in which players receive equipment and plasmids to encourage them to interact with the environment, rather than simply using aggression.

== Release ==
Minerva's Den was announced as the final piece of BioShock 2 DLC in August 2010. Minerva's Den is the only expansion for the game to offer new single-player experiences. The DLC was released on August 31 for PlayStation 3 and Xbox 360 consoles, with minimal promotion. Initially, there were no plans to release Minerva's Den and other BioShock 2 DLC for personal computers (PCs) but 2K later resumed development of the PC ports, and Minerva's Den was released for Microsoft Windows in 2011 and for OS X in 2015.

With the closure of the Games for Windows Live Marketplace in August 2013, BioShock 2 and all of its DLC was released on Steam in October 2013. The game was updated to support Steam achievements, Big Picture mode, and controllers. Minerva's Den was free for players who owned BioShock 2 before the update. In January 2013, Minerva's Den and the rest of BioShock 2 were rereleased in a bundle with BioShock as BioShock: Ultimate Rapture Edition. Minerva's Den was also included in the remastered 2016 BioShock compilation BioShock: The Collection, which has been released for Windows, PlayStation 4, Xbox One and Nintendo Switch.

== Reception and legacy ==
Reception

Aggregate score
Aggregator	Score
Metacritic	PS3: 81/100; X360: 82/100

Review scores
Publication	Score
Game Informer	85/100
GameSpot	8.5/10
GamesRadar+	9/10
PC Gamer (US)	81/100

Minerva's Den received generally favorable reviews, according to review aggregator Metacritic. The Daily Telegraph praised Minerva's Den after the lackluster BioShock 2 DLC that preceded it, and Eurogamer and IGN called it an excellent finale story for the setting of Rapture. Minerva's Den has been called one of the greatest DLC expansions of all time.

Critics said Minerva's Den plays much the same as BioShock 2 but welcomed the new additions to gameplay. Several reviewers felt the expansion offered a complete, concentrated BioShock 2 experience; Rock, Paper, Shotgun wrote Minerva's Den "hits the key beats of the ideas behind BioShock—manipulation, twisted technology, distorted values, ambition and folly—and it weaves all that into the improved combat system that, for some, makes BioShock 2 the superior of BioShock 1". Kotaku and Engadget found aspects of the gameplay repetitive, such as the reuse of "tedious" elements from the base game, and the need to perform certain gameplay sequences repeatedly.

Reviewers praised the narrative of Minerva's Den. GamesRadar's Andrew Heyward said the story makes Minerva's Den a "must-play extension" of the game's universe, and GameSpot's Kevin VanOrd wrote that while the setup for the expansion is familiar to BioShock players—voices on the radio telling the player where to go—the appeal lies with its "personal nature" and Porter's character. Reviews from GameSpot and Eurogamer considered Wahl a weak villain, but Porter a compelling protagonist. The video game theorist Robert Gallagher praised the game as a thoughtful and complex examination of themes of technology and humanity, and evidence that video games could explore such topics well.

The game's twist ending was positively received; VanOrd called it "surprising from a plot perspective and thematically consistent with prior BioShock revelations" though Engadget said that while the twist applies a retroactive motivation for the characters, it comes at the expense of the player's link to Subject Sigma. Kotaku's Heather Alexandra contrasted the twist with those of BioShock and BioShock Infinite, writing, "[those] games want to impress you. Minerva's Den wants to move you." Several reviewers felt the expansion's story stronger than that of BioShock 2.

Gaynor credited the positive experience with a small development team for changing his perception of creating games. Gaynor later joined Irrational Games, and his resulting dissatisfaction with the sprawling development of BioShock Infinite led Gaynor and two other Minerva's Den developers to start their own game studio, The Fullbright Company. Fullbright developed the acclaimed game Gone Home, which shares Minerva's Den's nonlinear exploration and character focus. The final non-combat exploration sequence of Minerva's Den served as a template for Gone Home.
