= The Bureau: XCOM Declassified =

2013 video game

- Developer: 2K Marin
- Publisher: 2K
- Director: Morgan Gray
- Producer: Alyssa Finley
- Designer: Zak McClendon
- Artist: Jeff Weir
- Writer: Erik Caponi
- Composer: Garry Schyman
- Series: X-COM
- Engine: Unreal Engine 3
- Platforms: PlayStation 3; Windows; Xbox 360; OS X
- Release: August 20, 2013: PlayStation 3, Windows, Xbox 360; NA: August 20, 2013; PAL: August 23, 2013 OS X; WW: November 27, 2013
- Genre: Tactical shooter
- Mode: Single-player

The Bureau: XCOM Declassified is a 2013 tactical third-person shooter video game developed by 2K Marin and published by 2K. The eighth title in the turn-based strategy series X-COM and a narrative prequel to XCOM: Enemy Unknown, it was released for PlayStation 3, Windows, and Xbox 360 in August 2013. Set in late 1962 at the height of the Cold War, the game's premise mainly revolves around The Bureau, the predecessor of the Extraterrestrial Combat Unit (XCOM), as they attempt to repel an alien invasion. As a tactical shooter, players can use the battle focus mode to issue commands to two other agents accompanying the protagonist, William Carter. Players can permanently lose their squad members so they must make good tactical decisions.

The game's development was protracted and troubled. Development began in 2006 and soon became a collaboration between 2K Marin and 2K Australia. Initially, the 2K Australia team wanted to create a mysterious first-person shooter with fearful alien life forms, and the player would be tasked to take photographs of them and research them in a secret government organization. However, after 2K Australia was removed from the project due to communication issues between the two studios, the Marin team decided to focus more on teamwork and tactical elements and rebranded the game as The Bureau: XCOM Declassified. The Day the Earth Stood Still and The X-Files inspired the game's artistic style while The Right Stuff inspired the game's narrative.

Revealed as XCOM in April 2010, the game was meant to be a reboot of the series; the idea was met with mixed reactions from critics. It missed several target release windows before release. The Bureau: XCOM Declassified received mixed reviews upon release, with critics praising the game's tactical elements and art style but criticizing the game's artificial intelligence, permadeath system, narrative, and gameplay. Most critics considered the game a disappointing entry into the series.

== Gameplay ==
The player can enter the battle focus mode to issue commands to the squad members.

The Bureau: XCOM Declassified is a tactical shooter played from a third-person perspective. In the game, the player assumes control of Agent William Carter, a field agent who has to defend the US from a hostile extraterrestrial force known as the Outsiders. The Bureau's headquarters serves as the game's hub space where Carter can interact with other people of interest. Using a dialogue tree, players can select different conversation options when talking to non-playable characters. Players also recruit agents in the headquarters and choose one of four different classes for them—commando, engineer, recon, and support. Each class has different abilities and weapons. For instance, the commando class specializes in direct offensive abilities and rifles, while the engineer class relies on landmines and automatic turrets. Players also choose the recruit's background from six possible options; each provides a minor perk that enhances the recruit's combat efficiency. Recruits can be further customized with different faces and uniforms. In mission areas, players are accompanied by only two recruited agents; other agents stay at the base or are dispatched to secondary tasks.

To combat the alien enemies, the player uses human and alien firearms, ranging from pistols and grenades to scatter laser and laser rifle. In order to flank enemies and avoid being shot by them, players can hide behind and switch between cover. If a cover is effective, a blue holographic shield is shown, otherwise a red shield is shown. Since ammunition is limited, players look for resupply in different ammo stashes or pick up new weapons by exploring each mission area. Players can assign commands to two companions who are controlled by artificial intelligence (AI). By entering the battle focus mode, in which time slows down nearly to a halt, players can instruct the companions to move to different positions, hide behind cover, target an enemy, or use a skill. In the console versions, commands are issued via a radial wheel, whereas in the PC version, commands are shown as a flat row of options for players to select. In the battle focus mode, the area of effects and the percentage of success of each attack, and the health status of the squad members, are displayed. Actions can be chained together to create combo attacks though special abilities usually have a cooldown time (abilities cannot be activated for a certain period of time after being used). An agent will become permanently unconscious or die if Carter is unable to revive the agent. Players explore each mission area to find documents and audio recordings that provide insight about the game's world.

Carter and his squad members gain experience points by completing missions and secondary tasks. The experience points allow the player character and their squad members to level up and gain new abilities. New options in the game's branching skill tree would also become available for players to unlock. The upgrade choices are binary—unselected choices are locked forever. Some of these upgrades include alien powers such as cloaking, levitation (which ascends enemies hiding between cover), and pulse wave (which knocks down enemies). Backpacks can be collected to boost the passive perks.

== Synopsis ==
=== Setting ===
The game is set in late 1962 at the height of the Cold War between the United States and Soviet Union. Prior to the events of the game, US President John F. Kennedy authorized the creation of the Bureau of Strategic Emergency Command, which was intended to coordinate US military forces in the event of a Soviet invasion of the US. A top-secret underground command bunker was constructed to house the bureau and military and civilian personnel were secretly contacted and told to report there in the event of an invasion. The bureau's director, Myron Faulke, had another vision for his organization: a bulwark against attacks from the Outsiders, hostile extraterrestrial forces who he believed had been operating on Earth for the past six months and had some connection to the recently discovered super-element elerium. As the game begins, Central Intelligence Agency special agent William Carter is tasked with delivering an important package to Faulke at the Bureau's research labs at Groom Range.

=== Plot ===
Responding to Director Faulke's summons, William Carter waits in a room at the Groom Range facility where he meets a military officer who informs him that she is to escort him to Faulke to deliver his briefcase. Carter is wary and refuses to go. A black fluid discharges from the officer's eyes; she shoots Carter and opens the case. The case emits a blinding light which incinerates the officer and stuns Carter. Moments later, Carter awakens to find his gunshot wound inexplicably healed and the case destroyed. The base comes under attack. Carter attempts to rescue Faulke as the attackers, identified as the Outsiders by bureau agents whom Carter encounters, easily slaughter the base's garrison. He eventually finds Faulke, but is too late to save J. Edgar Hoover, CIA director Frost, and General Deems (who was controlled by the aliens and killed the others). Carter escapes the Groom Range facility by tram just as Outsider devices cause the mountain to implode. He stalls the Outsider pursuit with a powerful Elerium bomb and he and Faulke flee on a Skyranger helicopter.

At the Bureau's command bunker, Faulke announces that communications worldwide are jammed and other US military bases have been destroyed in similar attacks. With no way to contact the White House and other American military leaders, Faulke formally activates the bureau which is renamed as XCOM. To counter the Outsider threat, Faulke assumes control of the country's remaining military forces while XCOM operatives planted in major cities keep the civilian populace from panicking by downplaying the attacks as safety drills.

Over the following weeks, Carter leads teams of agents across the country to retrieve important personnel, defend strategic sites, and recover what alien technology they can for research. Gradually, the bureau pieces together the Outsiders' motives: to conquer the Earth and xenoform it into a new home world while simultaneously enslaving humanity. The interrogation of an Outsider infiltrator, who Carter can gradually bring over to their side via persuasion, reveals that their species is commanded by an entity known as Origin through a psionic network called Mosaic, which the Infiltrator was disconnected from. Carter's team travels through a portal to the Outsider home world using the Avenger, a flying saucer XCOM has developed. There, Carter discovers that Mosaic is powered by an enslaved Ethereal, a being of pure energy with immense psionic power. The Outsiders have been searching for a dormant Ethereal on Earth (which is what was inside Carter's briefcase) that now inhabits his body. He manages to capture Origin's Ethereal, detonates a bomb at Mosaic's entry point, and returns to Earth.

At XCOM's base, the captured Ethereal named Shamash psionically contacts the Ethereal inside of Carter, Asaru. It becomes apparent that the player has actually been playing as Asaru. In its recently awakened state, Asaru believed itself to be human and psionically controlling William Carter. Shamash claims that because both the Outsiders and humans have learned how to capture Ethereals, the humans must be destroyed so that a force like Mosaic is never rebuilt. Upon hearing this, Carter manages to temporarily break free of Asaru and kills Shamash, who goes on to believe that Asaru will enslave them anyway. XCOM's base is discovered by the Outsiders after Faulke forces Weir, a previously retrieved cryptologist, to reconnect the Infiltrator to find where Origin is hiding and Carter attempts to defend it while attempting to break free from Asaru's control. Carter plants an explosive device with a thirty-second timer because he believes that the Ethereal will never allow him to be free.

=== Conclusion ===
Four endings are possible depending on the choices made at this point. If Asaru refuses to relinquish control of Carter, the bomb goes off and kills both of them.

Alternatively, Asaru can release Carter but only to willingly merge with either Dr. Weir, Agent Weaver, or Director Faulke. The new host knocks Carter unconscious and the remaining agents abandon the base. They discover that Origin still exists within the remains of the Mosaic network and has transported itself to Earth's orbit in order to command the Outsiders stranded on the planet. The crew of the Avenger mounts their final attack against Origin's ship, with Asaru providing the new host with the powers it had given Carter. During the mission, one of the other two host options is sacrificed and the other is rescued and Carter, who believes that Asaru is no different from the Outsiders, is either executed or incarcerated. Asaru's host discovers a secondary entry point for Mosaic and psionically integrates with the network and destroys Origin and its influence over the Outsiders.

The aftermath of the Outsider invasion is revealed in the form of a debriefing of Asaru's host.

- If Asaru merges with Weir, he persuades the Outsiders to cease their attack and help rebuild before departing amicably to continue their search for a homeworld; Outsider technology is carefully disassembled and stored away, sites of Outsider attacks are quietly erased from the national register or explained away as natural disasters.
- If Asaru merges with Weaver, she forces the Outsiders to kill each other; all Outsider technology and evidence of their attacks is destroyed, in some cases with nuclear weapons.
- If Asaru merges with Faulke, he commands the Outsiders to stand down and rebuild before being exterminated; some Outsider technology is preserved and provides considerable scientific and military advances, sites of Outsider attacks are erased.

In any case, the Outsider invasion is successfully covered up with only the members of XCOM and a handful of top US and other world leaders aware of how close the human race came to extinction. The debriefing concludes with a description of how Asaru severs contact with its host and departs after the Outsiders are dealt with. Asaru's intentions remain unknown. The musical score segues into a theme from XCOM: Enemy Unknown.

== Development ==
=== As XCOM (2006–2011) ===
The first iteration of this game was set in the 1950s. In the screenshot, an alien transforms into a circular ring and is about to unleash laser beams at the protagonists.

Take-Two Interactive, the parent company of the game's publisher 2K Games, purchased the intellectual property rights of X-COM from Infogrames in 2005. In 2006, 2K Games acquired Irrational Games, which had an office in Boston and another in Australia. Irrational Games, led by Ken Levine, was primarily focused on the development of BioShock but the team wanted to develop two projects simultaneously. Both offices created different pitches for a new X-COM game.

Initially, the team attempted to return to the strategy root of the franchise using the engine that powered Freedom Force but because of the popularity of and the team's expertise in first-person shooters (having worked on SWAT 4 and System Shock 2), they changed genres. However, the team found it difficult to translate the strategy elements into a shooter and many pitches were abandoned. One of the pitches was set in a world conquered by extraterrestrial forces where the hero, inspired by Dave Grohl, leads a revolution against the aliens.

Another pitch had the player character escape an alien vessel and mount the back of a colossal alien. The Australian branch experimented with asymmetrical multiplayer, in which a group of players played as human soldiers while another group controlled the aliens. Levine's Boston office withdrew from the game's development to focus on BioShock's production. Irrational Games Australia later split to become 2K Australia.

When 2K Australia assumed full creative control, they decided to use the setting pitched by the Boston office and set the game in the 1950s where humanity was technologically incapable of fighting against advanced alien enemies. Development of the game stalled when Take-Two assigned 2K Australia to assist the development of BioShock and its sequel. The initial goal of the project was to create a first-person shooter that could "elicit fear and confusion." The pitch was named X-COM: Enemy Unknown, a word play on UFO: Enemy Unknown, the first X-COM title, while also reflecting the mysterious and unknowable nature of the aliens. This pitch was also inspired by X-Files: the game's protagonist was a government official who would investigate alien sightings across North America, collect information, and return to a secret military laboratory for research and strategy planning. The version had limited procedural generation. The art team envisioned the aliens as globs of goo. The first alien created by the team was the titan, which was heavily featured in the game's marketing materials.

2K Games saw the game's potential and assigned 2K Marin a supporting role in the game's development. They began conceptualizing multiplayer modes for the game and modifying the game engine. Initially, the team drafted a cooperative multiplayer mode similar to Left 4 Dead. It would also have an AI director to determine when and where enemies would spawn. Although the two studios were working on two separate components, their distant geographical locations and different time zones hindered communication and made collaboration difficult. On April 14, 2010, 2K Games merged 2K Australia into 2K Marin and officially revealed the project as XCOM. Despite the merge, communication problems persisted and the game failed to meet several development milestones. 2K Games then removed the multiplayer portion completely and reassigned the Marin studio to work with the Australian team on the single-player portion.

Led by the Australian design team, the Marin studio worked on the first-person portion, also known as Field Ops, while the Australian team contributed to the strategy elements of the game. 2K Marin had no idea how to animate and program the behaviors of an enemy that was "unknowable". A prime component in gameplay design was to photograph aliens, but the unknowable enemies had no face and players could not determine if the enemy was looking at the protagonist. To improve communication, the teams swapped employees between the two studios, though this failed to stop some employees from leaving the project.

A gameplay demonstration was shown to the press at E3 2010. Players could complete rescue tasks, anomaly missions, and unknown missions. The weapons were futuristic and players were tasked to take photographs of aliens, and were allowed to withdraw from a mission once sufficient information was collected. Players could also explore the XCOM base in first-person; the base would gradually expand as the player completed more missions. The game also featured a branching path where completing one mission could mean that other missions became inaccessible. Jonathan Pelling, the creative director, said that the team tried to uphold the "core X-COM tenets". He described the game as a "systematic" first-person shooter in which the story would unlock gradually depending on how much the player had achieved. Pelling said the game's design of 1950s America was inspired by how Norman Rockwell advertisement depicted that period of time (not how it actually was)—one "where people feel comfortable and everything is optimistic."

=== Transition to The Bureau (2011–2012) ===
After creative leads the Australian branch left the company in 2011, the main 2K Marin studio became the lead developer and exerted more control over the game's development. 2K Marin experimented with some conventional game features, including stealth gameplay and a suspicion system, in which enemies would be alerted if the players acted abnormally. Jordan Thomas became the game's narrative director and he pushed the setting to 1962—the height of Cold War. The new storyline also included issues centered in the civil rights movement. 2K Marin streamlined the game's features, turning open-ended levels into more linear ones, making humanoid enemies the main enemy types and downplaying the mysterious component. The radial wheel was introduced in 2011 as well as Time Units (using skills and battle focus would drain time). 2K Marin was unhappy with the state of the game and asked 2K Games permission to create a new demo for E3 2011. They wanted to increase squad tactics and switch the game to a third-person perspective so that it would resemble classic XCOM games.

After seeing the positive press reaction to the demo shown at E3 2011, 2K Games agreed to let the team reboot the project. Thomas envisioned the rebooted project as a link between Firaxis Games' XCOM: Enemy Unknown and the older X-COM titles. Most of the stealth and horror elements were discarded and the game was redesigned to become a tactical shooter. The changes were a lot of work and with continued communication problems between 2K Australia and 2K Marin, development was behind schedule. 2K Games intervened and removed the Australian branch from the project, though some Australian staff members were offered to relocate to the Marin office and continue their work. 2K Marin's studio head John Chowanec forced the team to work nine hours a day to speed up development. Thomas left the project to work on BioShock Infinite.

=== As The Bureau: XCOM Declassified (2012–2013) ===
After the departure of Thomas, Zak McClendon, the narrative designer of BioShock 2, led the game's gameplay design. Under his guidance, 2K Marin began including classic X-COM enemies into the game. Having missed multiple milestones, the game entered its alpha stage in mid-2012; the game was playable from beginning to end. The game entered the beta stage in March 2013 and the publishing arm of 2K Games began promoting the game more heavily. During this period, 2K Marin also exchanged ideas with Firaxis Games. The game has multiple references to XCOM: Enemy Unknown and other X-COM games, though the enemies are less advanced than those in Firaxis' reboot since the story takes place over 60 years earlier.

In late 2012, the studio experimented with real-time strategy gameplay, in which players controlled agents from a top-down perspective. The radial wheel was reintroduced, though the team realized that players did not give commands to other characters during the testing phase. Early playtesters also complained that switching between agents was too slow and cumbersome. To solve the problem, the team streamlined gameplay by removing Time Units and the ability to assume control of different agents. Playtesters found the radial wheel confusing to use because there were too many skills to choose from when all agents reached their maximum levels. The team, in response, created a radial menu in which the selected option would expand and the rest of the menu would shrink in size.

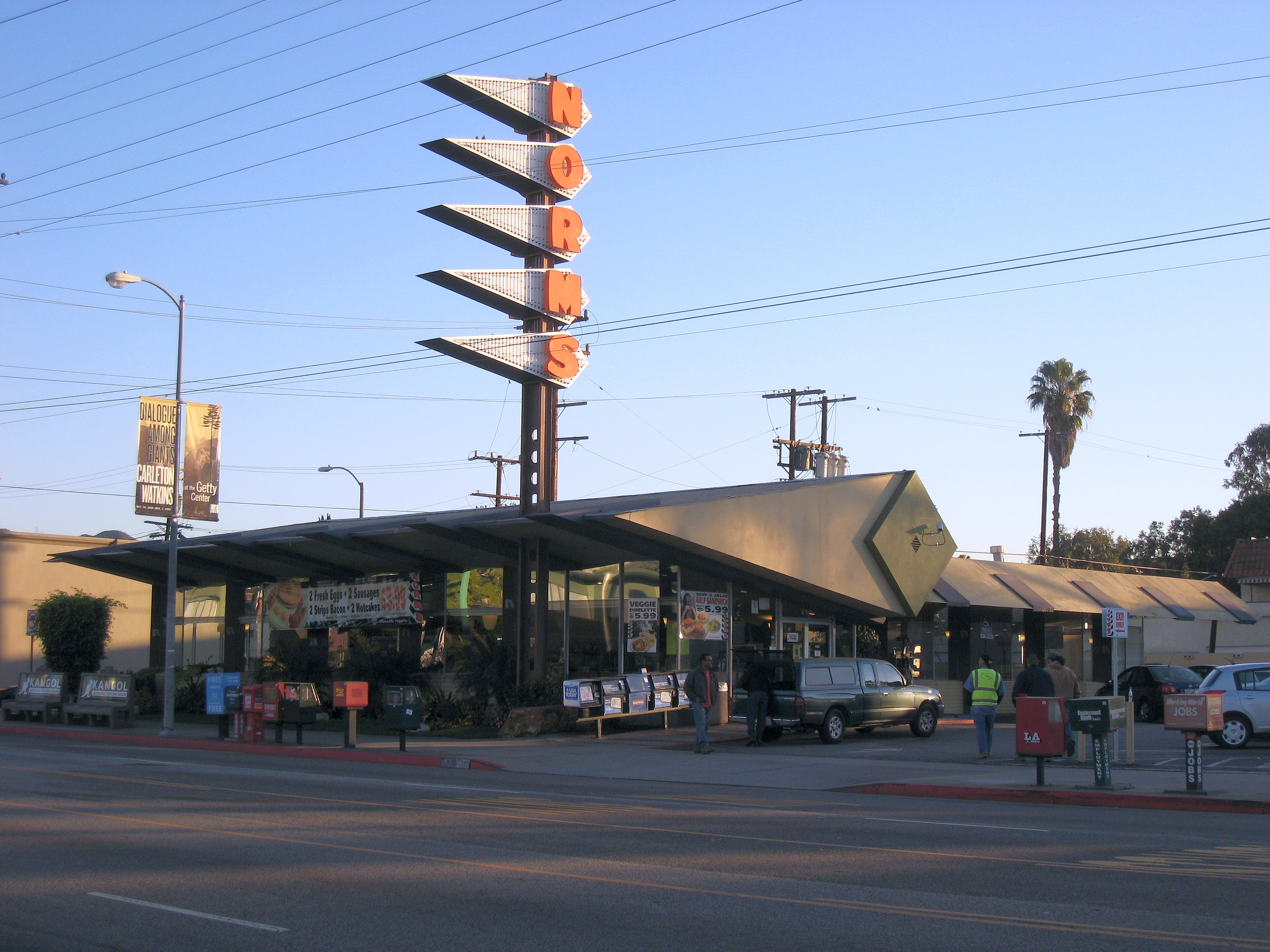
The 1960s architecture featured in the game was inspired by the Googie style.

With the game's setting shifted to the 1960s, the art style became more realistic. It was inspired by The Day the Earth Stood Still, The X-Files, and Mad Men. The 1960s architecture featured in the game was inspired by the Googie style. Erik Caponi served as the game's narrative lead. His main task was to fill the gaps in the overarching story previously written by Thomas. He was inspired by The Right Stuff and The Conversation. In the game, each mission is a self-contained narrative, similar to an episode of a television show. He compared it to a role-playing game (RPG) in which the story is more personalized. Players action would bring consequences to the game's world that would result in several alternate endings. To increase player agency, different side objectives were introduced to the game.

According to Gray, the XCOM base was an important part of the game. Grey described the base as "a character in itself" and one that would slowly change as the story unfolds. He compared it to the Normandy ship in the Mass Effect trilogy. Unlike XCOM: Enemy Unknown, players could not conduct any research as time did not pass between missions and the team believed that research would disrupt the game's narrative and remove the game's tension. Players can pick up alien weaponry in the field, an approach which was seen as more immediate by the team. The base is also the place in which players recruit new agents. The team felt that it was impractical to create hundreds of agents with unique personalities and voices and hoped that players could instead relate to them through gameplay. Players could not recruit female agents because Caponi wanted the misogyny of the period to be represented in the game.

Seeing the popularity of difficult games like XCOM: Enemy Unknown, Dark Souls and Fire Emblem, the team designed the game to be unforgiving. Players are easily outnumbered and agents can die permanently. This prompts players to utilize different tactics in order to survive. According to Finley, run and gun would result in the death of the protagonist. The AI was programmed to ensure that the accompanying agents could survive on their own, though they require player input to function effectively. The game was designed to cater to a wide audience, including both strategy fans and action game players. Inspired by Fallout 3, the design team aimed to create a fluid gameplay experience with deep strategy gameplay. In addition, the team slowed down the movement speed of the playable character to encourage players to think tactically before they entered the warzone.

== Release ==
XCOM was announced on April 13, 2010, for Windows and Xbox 360. The first gameplay demonstration was shown at E3 2010. XCOM received a mixed critical reception. Some critics criticized the game for not returning to the franchise's root of turn-based strategy as well as the lack of tactics involved in gameplay, especially since the game was meant to serve as a reboot to the series. Julian Gollop, the creator of the X-COM series, was disappointed by the game's first-person perspective and he criticized the game for abandoning the turn-based gameplay. Christoph Hartmann, the president of 2K Games, responded by saying that turn-based strategy games are not contemporary and that the series needed to be revitalized with new gameplay ideas so that the game could be "in line with what this generation of gamers want".

The game did not have any public promotion until a year later at E3 2011. 2K Games announced that the game would be released March 6, 2012, the same day as competitor Electronic Arts released Mass Effect 3. In early 2012, the release was delayed until 2013 and then until 2K Game's fiscal year 2014, which meant that the franchise would be relaunched with Firaxis' XCOM: Enemy Unknown instead. After another year of silence, 2K Games registered several new domains that hinted the game might return with a new title, possibly as The Bureau or What Happened in 62. In April 2013, the official website and all promotional videos and trailers for XCOM on YouTube were removed by the publisher, and 2K Games teased that the game had undergone a major evolution. The Bureau: XCOM Declassified was officially announced on April 26, 2013, for PlayStation 3, Windows, and Xbox 360. The game was released in North America and Europe on August 20 and 23, respectively. TransGaming handled the game's release for the OS X platform in December 2013.

When the game was announced, 2K Games released a live-action trailer for the game titled The Burn Room. The Burn Room was later expanded to become a short mini-series. Henry Hobson, who had previously directed the opening sequence of The Last of Us and the live-action trailer for Resistance 3, directed the series of trailers. The mini-series stars Dominic Monaghan as Agent Ennis Cole. To promote the game, 2K Games also launched an interactive browser game called the Hungover X as a spoof. Downloadable content was released for the game: "Hangar 6 R&D" was released exclusively for Xbox 360 and served as a prequel, and players who preordered the game gained access to "Codebreakers". Those who preordered the game using GAME unlocked the Light Plasma Pistol. Both "Codebreakers" and the Light Plasma Pistol were released on October 15, 2013.

== Reception ==
=== Critical reception ===
Reception

Aggregate score
Aggregator	Score
Metacritic	(PS3) 69/100 (X360) 68/100 (PC) 66/100

Review scores
Publication	Score
Destructoid	4.5/10
Electronic Gaming Monthly	8/10
Eurogamer	7/10
Game Informer	7.5/10
GameSpot	6/10
GamesRadar+	3/5
IGN	5.5/10
Joystiq	4/5
PC Gamer (US)	62/100
Polygon	7/10

The gameplay received a mixed response. The game's incompetent artificial intelligence (AI) was a common point of criticism because it needed player input to function properly and made squad management cumbersome. The permadeath feature was criticized by Matt Miller from Game Informer for being unengaging because players can always restart from checkpoint, and that agent deaths lacked impact and turned gameplay into a "monotonous slog" according to GameSpot's reviewer Kevin VanOrd.

Ludwig Kietzmann from Joystiq noted that without these companions, combat could become very difficult but their loss was "felt in utility more than emotion." VanOrd found the gunplay entertaining while Dan Stapleton from IGN found it serviceable. Stapleton also praised the variety of enemies which kept the combat from becoming stale after several hours. James Stephanie Sterling from Destructoid was disappointed by the Battle Focus mode because it was inconvenient to use.

Critics noted the game's challenging nature and believed that using tactics was largely the only way to succeed in the game. Whitehead enjoyed the combat perks and skills that helped open up new combat possibilities. Justin McElroy from Polygon also liked the skills since they could be chained seamlessly together. Hollander Cooper from GamesRadar also reacted positively to the combat skills, saying that unlocking these skills and utilizing them in combat was rewarding and engaging.

Critics were mixed about the game's story. Miller felt that most of the agent recruits were lifeless and boring and compared them unfavorably to the companions from Mass Effect; however, he felt the final act story twist reinvigorated the story. VanOrd agreed, saying that the twist was a welcome change of pace, though he did not think the story made much sense. He also believed that navigating the XCOM base helped players immerse themselves in the 1960s atmosphere, but found it uninteresting with redundant story beats and repeating themes.

Stapleton thought the twist was non-sensical. Cooper agreed, saying that while the story started strong, it collapsed in the final act. He also criticized the characters, especially Carter, for being uninteresting. This was echoed by Sterling, who described Carter as an "outdated archetype" who was unlikeable. Both Stapleton and Birnbaum criticized the XCOM base for being empty and they lamented the lack of research options. Birnbaum further noted that there was a disconnect between exploration of the base and the main missions. Whitehead felt that many of the interactions between Carter and other non-playable characters were pointless and served no narrative purpose.

Josh Harmon from Electronic Gaming Monthly liked the game's narrative, which he compared to the work of Arthur C. Clarke. He also liked the environmental storytelling and compared it to the team's previous work on BioShock. McElroy noted that recruiting companions was poorly executed because it was pointless to put untested agents on the field, and Whitehead criticized the secondary tasks for being undercooked missions which lacked strategy depth.

VanOrd applauded the team for creating a period-accurate retro-futuristic atmosphere. Stapleton also liked the visuals, though he noted several gameplay components undermined the consistency, especially how XCOM agents acquired alien weaponry for their own use without proper in-game explanation. Harmon also enjoyed the game's art style but found it unpolished as he noticed different texture issues and cutscene animation hiccups. Kietzmann called the art "a major point of pride for the developers", praising its rich details and the depiction of different rural locales. Birnbaum wrote that the 1960s suburban areas featured in the game were "painstakingly recreated" and admired the team's efforts in building the game's world.

=== Sales ===
According to analyst Doug Creutz from Cowen and Company, the game was unlikely to be a financial success for 2K Games and he predicted that fewer than 250,000 units would be sold by the end of 2013 in North America. The game was launched in a highly competitive week against Saints Row IV, Tom Clancy's Splinter Cell: Blacklist, and Disney Infinity. It became the tenth best-selling retail game in the UK in its week of release, according to Chart-Track.
