= Rapture (BioShock) =

Fictional underwater city in the BioShock series

- BioShock location
- Rapture as depicted in BioShock
- First appearance: BioShock (2007)
- Created by: Irrational Games

In-universe information
- Type: Underwater city

Rapture is a fictional underwater city in the BioShock series. It is the principal setting of BioShock (2007) and BioShock 2 (2010), and later appears in BioShock Infinite (2013) and its downloadable expansion Burial at Sea. Within the series, Rapture was founded after the end of the second world war in 1946 by Andrew Ryan as an isolated society intended to permit unrestricted individual, scientific and economic freedom. By the beginning of the first game, the city has largely collapsed following political conflict, extreme social inequality and widespread genetic modification.

Rapture was designed by the developers of BioShock as an isolated environment from which the player could not easily escape. Its visual design draws heavily on Art Deco, early- and mid-20th-century architecture, advertising and popular culture. The developers used Rapture's ruined spaces, audio recordings, advertisements and environmental details to communicate the city's history without relying primarily on conventional exposition.

The setting has received extensive critical and academic analysis. Writers have discussed Rapture in relation to Objectivism, political extremism, the social contract, propaganda, alternate history, environmental storytelling and the architectural uncanny. Rapture has also frequently been identified by critics as one of the most distinctive fictional cities in video games.

== Concept and development ==
=== Origins and philosophy ===
Creative director Ken Levine said that Rapture developed from the need for an isolated but explorable game environment. The developers wanted a location from which the player could not simply walk away, and eventually settled on an underwater city whose physical isolation could support a self-contained society and history. Levine said that the team gradually developed Rapture around the idea of a society created according to an uncompromising political philosophy. Among the influences he identified were Ayn Rand's The Fountainhead and Atlas Shrugged, George Orwell's Animal Farm, and Logan's Run. Andrew Ryan was consequently portrayed as an industrialist attempting to construct a society free from government, organized religion and restrictions on scientific or economic activity. Levine said that the developers were less interested in presenting a straightforward argument against a particular philosophy than in examining what happened when idealized political systems encountered human behaviour. He described Rapture before its collapse as an expression of Ryan's ideals, with the deterioration of the city representing pressures that those ideals could not accommodate.

The developers also intended Rapture's ruined condition to create a sense of loss. Levine cited The Shining as an influence on his approach to horror, explaining that he found environments more disturbing when the audience could perceive what they had once been. Rapture was therefore designed as a formerly prosperous and visually impressive city that the player encounters after its social collapse.

=== Art direction ===
Rapture's visual identity was developed around Art Deco architecture and cultural imagery associated with the first half of the 20th century. During development, Levine and his wife photographed architectural details in New York City, including features of Rockefeller Center and the Empire State Building, which were supplied to the art team as visual references. The developers combined monumental architecture, geometric decoration, period-inspired interiors and commercial advertising to establish the city as a product of the era in which Ryan conceived it. Areas of Rapture were constructed so that their original purposes remained recognizable after their deterioration, including theatres, hospitals, apartments, restaurants and shopping districts. The game's advertisements were likewise designed to resemble period commercial art. Some imagery drew directly upon surviving examples of early- and mid-20th-century advertising, which was altered and incorporated into Rapture's fictional brands and commercial environment.

The underwater setting was repeatedly incorporated into Rapture's visual presentation. Windows and observation areas expose the player to the surrounding ocean, while leaks, flooding and damaged tunnels reinforce the city's physical vulnerability. Exterior views contrast the darkness of the ocean with Rapture's illuminated towers and signage.

=== Environmental storytelling ===
Levine described the developers' approach to Rapture as a form of environmental mise-en-scène. Rather than presenting most of the city's history through cutscenes, the team placed narrative information within rooms, corpses, graffiti, advertisements and other environmental details, allowing players to infer events while continuing to explore. Audio diaries were used to supplement this approach. They provide optional accounts from former inhabitants and allow players who are interested in Rapture's history to obtain additional information without requiring every player to stop for the same amount of exposition.

Individual districts were designed around their former social functions and the people associated with them. In Fort Frolic, for example, level designer Jordan Thomas attempted to make the environment appear to respond to artist Sander Cohen before Cohen himself appeared. Thomas used lighting changes, music, sculptures and staged bodies to suggest Cohen's control over the district.

=== Later depictions ===
Rapture was revisited in BioShock 2, whose developers expanded the setting through areas not shown in the first game. These included residential and working-class districts, public facilities and entertainment areas that depicted aspects of Rapture's society outside the locations explored in BioShock.

Irrational Games later returned to the city in BioShock Infinite: Burial at Sea. Levine said that one reason for revisiting Rapture was the opportunity to depict it before the collapse shown in the original game. Improvements in technology enabled the developers to populate its public spaces with civilians and present restaurants, shops and other parts of the city operating normally rather than almost entirely as ruins.

== Depiction ==
The city's earlier history was expanded in the 2011 novel BioShock: Rapture by John Shirley, which concerns the construction of Rapture and events preceding its collapse. Andrew Ryan begins constructing Rapture beneath the Atlantic Ocean after the Second World War. He intends the city to provide refuge for people whom he considers exceptional creators, scientists and industrialists, free from governments, religion and regulation. Rapture initially prospers, but its economic system produces pronounced social divisions.

Former businessman Frank Fontaine builds a competing power base among poorer inhabitants while profiting from ADAM, a substance derived from sea slugs that allows users to alter their genetic structure and acquire extraordinary abilities. The proliferation of ADAM and the substances derived from it contributes to addiction and increasingly extreme biological experimentation. Ryan eventually moves against Fontaine and assumes control of his businesses. Fontaine secretly survives and adopts the identity of Atlas, using growing resentment amongst the populace against Ryan to organize an uprising. Ryan increasingly abandons the libertarian principles on which he founded Rapture as he attempts to preserve his control of the city.

By 1960, civil conflict has devastated Rapture. Much of its surviving population consists of genetically altered and often mentally unstable "Splicers", who serve as the primary enemies of the first two BioShock games. Through the excessive use of ADAM, Splicers have been permanently endowed with various superpowers, but who also became ludicrously and irreversibly insane with disfigured bodies. Splicers often come into conflict with Big Daddies, who protect Little Sisters as they harvest ADAM that is coveted by the Splicers.

BioShock follows as Jack travels through the ruined city while becoming involved in the conflict between Atlas and Ryan. BioShock 2 takes place eight years later and depicts a further-deteriorated Rapture. After Ryan's death, psychologist Sofia Lamb has organized many survivors into a collectivist community known as the Rapture Family. The player controls Subject Delta, an early Big Daddy prototype who attempts to reunite with Lamb's daughter Eleanor.

Rapture appears briefly near the conclusion of BioShock Infinite. The two-part expansion Burial at Sea returns to the city shortly before the events of the first BioShock, depicting parts of Rapture before and during the beginning of its civil conflict.

== Reception ==
Rapture was widely praised as a setting following the release of BioShock. Charles Herold of The New York Times described the city as one of the game's principal attractions, finding the remains of Ryan's failed society both compelling and disturbing to explore. Mike Doolittle of GameCritics praised the combination of Art Deco architecture and advanced technology, and considered the impression that the damaged city continued to function around the player an important part of its effectiveness.

Critical reaction to the return to Rapture in BioShock 2 was more mixed. Nicky Woolf of The Guardian praised the city's deteriorating Art Deco environments and the detail given to inhabitants who appeared to continue their routines within the ruins. Michael McWhertor of Kotaku, by contrast, found Rapture less mysterious on a second visit and considered portions of the sequel's early return to the city overly familiar, although he found that concern diminished as the game progressed.

Reviewing Burial at Sea, Nick Cowen of The Guardian welcomed the opportunity to see Rapture functioning before its collapse. He highlighted the populated streets, shops, music and conversations while finding that the pre-war city retained the visual identity of the original game's setting.

== Analysis ==
=== Architecture and environmental storytelling ===
Matthew Jason Weise places Rapture within a design lineage extending from Ultima Underworld through the System Shock series. He argues that Rapture provides fictional explanations for conventions inherited from those games: the underwater location prevents the protagonist from simply leaving, civil conflict accounts for its largely abandoned spaces, and unrestricted genetic experimentation explains many of its hostile inhabitants.

Lyz Reblin-Renshaw analyzes the relationship between Rapture's physical architecture and gameplay. She notes that constrained interiors and obstructed sight lines shape combat encounters, while water functions both as part of the city's fictional environment and as a gameplay element capable of interacting with electrical abilities. She also connects Rapture's Art Deco imagery and its identity as a lost underwater civilization with the political and literary influences underlying Andrew Ryan's society.

Grant Tavinor argues that Rapture's artistic effectiveness results from the integration of its architecture, period music, advertising, cultural references and philosophical themes. Rather than treating its visual design as decorative, he identifies the environment as one of the principal means through which BioShock communicates its fictional world.

Robert Yeates analyzes Rapture through the architectural uncanny, comparing the ruined city to a haunted house. He argues that spaces originally constructed for familiar civic purposes have been transformed into disturbing inversions of themselves: hospitals are associated with death, domestic spaces contain corpses and entertainment venues have become sites of violence. Yeates also examines the contrast between Rapture's brightly illuminated towers and the darkness of the surrounding ocean. He connects the city's skyscrapers, electric lighting and technological imagery with early-20th-century visions of modern progress, arguing that their ruined state transforms the environment into the remains of a promised future that has failed. He further identifies Rapture's audio recordings, abandoned homes and other traces of its former inhabitants as a form of haunting. The player encounters the city simultaneously as a physical ruin and through fragments of the society that previously occupied it.

=== Political ideology ===
Rapture has frequently been analyzed in relation to Ayn Rand and Objectivism. Joseph Packer argues that BioShock uses the destruction of Ryan's society as a dystopian critique of laissez-faire Objectivism. He maintains that this criticism is communicated through the game's environments and mechanics as well as through its explicit narrative. Reblin-Renshaw similarly treats Ryan's political philosophy as integral to Rapture's construction. She argues that the city presents extreme individualism and unrestricted markets alongside increasing inequality, unethical scientific practice and the eventual breakdown of social order.

Nash Meade analyzes Rapture through theories of the social contract. He argues that Ryan initially expects rational individuals to coexist without substantial governmental authority, but that monopolization, social inequality, Fontaine's rise and unrestricted experimentation eventually create pressures Ryan cannot resolve without exercising political powers incompatible with his founding principles. Meade identifies Ryan's seizure of Fontaine's businesses and restrictions on smuggling as central contradictions in Rapture's development. In his reading, Ryan attempts to preserve a society founded on personal sovereignty by increasingly compelling its inhabitants to submit to centralized authority.

Rachel McKinnon examines the propaganda distributed throughout Rapture by Andrew Ryan. She distinguishes Ryan's rhetoric from simple deception, arguing that much of it is intended to shape how inhabitants understand themselves, Ryan's opponents and the political structure of the city. McKinnon argues that Ryan repeatedly frames productive individuals as morally distinct from the "parasites" he believes exploit them. As Ryan's conduct becomes increasingly authoritarian, public messages concerning smuggling and opposition to his leadership allow him to portray threats to his own control as threats to the survival of Rapture itself. The location of this rhetoric within posters, public announcements and recorded messages means that political ideology is embedded directly into the environments explored by the player rather than appearing solely in dialogue.

Ryan Lizardi views BioShock 2 as extending the political argument by replacing Ryan's extreme individualism with Sofia Lamb's extreme collectivism. He argues that using the same city for both ideologies allows the series to criticize political absolutism rather than simply replacing one doctrine with another.

=== Alternate history ===
Lizardi analyzes Rapture as an alternate-history representation of the mid-20th century. Rather than reproducing the United States of the 1950s and 1960s, BioShock constructs a concealed society in which recognizable political and cultural ideas develop under radically different circumstances. He argues that Rapture's fantastic isolation creates distance from conventional historical narratives while still encouraging comparison with the real political and economic debates from which its fictional history draws.

Lars Schmeink similarly places BioShock at the intersection of dystopian fiction and alternate history. He argues that Rapture presents a counterfactual society whose collapse encourages comparison between the fictional results of Ryan's political experiment and the historical world from which the game diverges.

== Legacy ==
Rapture continued to receive recognition in retrospective criticism after the release of the original games. In 2014, Will Freeman of The Guardian ranked it first in a selection of notable video game cities, citing its accumulated history, environmental detail and combination of beauty and horror.

Writing for The Washington Post on the fifteenth anniversary of BioShock, Cameron Kunzelman identified the interaction between Rapture's enclosed environment and the game's narrative techniques as an important part of BioShock's subsequent reputation and influence on narrative-focused video games.

Rapture has also extended beyond the games themselves. Paul Booth has discussed the city and its associated narratives as an example of transmedia storytelling, in which the world established by BioShock is expanded through later games and works such as BioShock: Rapture rather than merely repeated across different media.
