= BioShock (series) =

First-person shooter video game franchise

- Logo for BioShock, the first game in the series
- Genre: First-person shooter
- Developers: Irrational Games; 2K Australia; 2K Marin
- Publisher: 2K
- Creator: Ken Levine
- Producers: Alyssa Finley; Melissa Miller; Adrian Murphy
- Artists: Scott Sinclair; Hogarth de la Plante
- Writers: Ken Levine; Jordan Thomas; Steve Gaynor; Drew Holmes
- Composer: Garry Schyman
- Platforms: Microsoft Windows; Xbox 360; Xbox One; PlayStation 3; PlayStation 4; OS X; iOS; Linux; Shield Portable; Shield Tablet; Shield Android TV; Nintendo Switch
- First release: BioShock: NA: August 21, 2007
- Latest release: BioShock: The Collection: NA: September 13, 2016

BioShock is a retrofuturistic video game series created by Ken Levine, published by 2K and developed by several studios, including Irrational Games and 2K Marin. The BioShock games combine first-person shooter and role-playing elements, giving the player freedom for how to approach combat and other situations, and are considered part of the immersive sim genre. Additionally, the series is notable for exploring philosophical and moral concepts with a strong in-game narrative influenced by concepts such as objectivism, total utilitarianism, and American exceptionalism.

The series consists of three main games. BioShock (2007) and BioShock 2 (2010) take place in the 1960s in the fictional underwater city of Rapture. BioShock Infinite (2013) is thematically and narratively tied to the first games, and takes place in 1912 aboard the floating city of Columbia. After Infinite's release, Irrational Games was downsized and rebranded as Ghost Story Games to work on smaller titles, while 2K Games retained rights to BioShock. The publisher announced that a new BioShock game was in development by Cloud Chamber in December 2019.

The game series has received critical and commercial acclaim. The series had sold more than 43 million copies by August 2024 making the series one of the best-selling video game franchises of all time. A film adaptation of the series is in development at Netflix.

== Development and common elements ==
Developer Ken Levine founded Irrational Games in 1997 out of former members from Looking Glass Studios. Irrational Games produced System Shock 2, a sequel to Looking Glass's System Shock; Levine pitched another System Shock sequel to Electronic Arts, but the publisher rejected the idea based on System Shock 2's poor commercial performance. While Irrational worked on other projects, Levine still wanted to create a successor to System Shock 2. Levine said, "I have my useless liberal arts degree, so I've read stuff from Ayn Rand, George Orwell and all the sort of utopian and dystopian writings of the 20th century, and having developed the System Shock franchise, some of my first games, I felt that the atmosphere was a good one to set for a dystopian environment, one we borrowed heavily from System Shock." Levine has mentioned an interest in "stem cell research and the moral issues that go around [it]." In regard to artistic influences, Levine cited the books Nineteen Eighty-Four and Logan's Run, which represent societies that have "really interesting ideas screwed up by the fact that we're people." Walking through Rockefeller Center near the GE Building in New York City, Levine was inspired by the art deco styling of Rockefeller Center to make a similarly inspired space that had not been experienced in the first-person shooter genre.

The games in the BioShock series are first-person shooters with role-playing elements. While precise mechanics differ between all three games, they share common themes of players using a combination of weapons, the environment, and superhuman abilities—called "Plasmids" in BioShock and BioShock 2, or "Vigors" in Infinite—to defeat enemies. These weapons and powers can be used in various combinations to aid in defeating foes; for example, shocking a pool of water will electrocute the enemies standing in the liquid. In comparison to the hybrid role-playing game/first-person shooter stylings of System Shock, BioShock was marketed as a shooter to appeal to fans of the increasingly-popular genre. The gameplay nevertheless retained comparable elements: plasmids in BioShock supplied by "EVE hypos" serve the same function as "Psionic Abilities" supplied by "PSI hypos" in System Shock 2; the player needs to deal with enemy security cameras, machine gun turrets, and robots, and has the ability to hack them in both games; the player must manage supplies and ammunition; and audio tape recordings fulfill the same storytelling role as email logs did in the System Shock games.

Levine stated in 2010 that the name "BioShock" is not in reference to any specific setting or location, but instead a means of encapsulating common gameplay elements that reflects on their earlier games and the BioShock series.

To me, there's two things that make a BioShock game BioShock. They take place in a world that is both fantastic and ridiculous. Something that you've never seen before and something that nobody else could create except Irrational, but it's also strangely grounded and believable. The other thing that makes it a BioShock game, it's about having a huge toolset of power and a huge range of challenges, and you being able to drive how you solve those challenges.

— Ken Levine, Irrational Games,

=== Themes ===
Following from its influences in System Shock 2, the games in the BioShock series broadly raise the question of free will of the central character, often acting at suggestions of an unreliable narrator who is using the character for their own ulterior motives. Levine had long been interested in evaluating how choice works in video games, both at the narrative level as well as at the player level, and the BioShock games represent his attempt to alter the perception of choice typically associated with the interactive medium. In BioShock, the player-character follows instructions from a man named Atlas to kill Andrew Ryan, the founder of the underwater city of Rapture. Once the character meets Ryan, Ryan reveals that the character has been under mind control throughout their arrival in Rapture, following any instruction led off by "Would you kindly...", which Atlas had been using. Ryan shows that he chooses free will by using the trigger phrase to have the character kill him, stating "A man chooses, a slave obeys" before his death.

The first BioShock game is themed around the philosophy of Objectivism established by Ayn Rand. Levine had been inspired for the game's setting after visiting the GE Building and the statue of Atlas in front of it while in New York City, and researching John D. Rockefeller, whom Levine called "a great man building an architectural triumph against all the odds". This led to the creation of Rapture and the character of Andrew Ryan loosely based on Rockefeller, with Ryan's name based on Ayn Rand's. Levine incorporated Objectivism concepts into these elements, particularly on the idea that man should be driven by selfishness and not altruism. One major gameplay element requires the player to decide how they interact with the Little Sisters that have harvested ADAM, either opting to save the girls for a small reward, or harvest the full amount of ADAM for their own benefit by killing the Little Sisters. Ars Technica states that the city of Rapture falls not necessarily because of objectivism, but through the corrupting power needed to control such a city.

BioShock 2 focuses on versions of utilitarian and collectivist ideals. Sofia Lamb, who rose to control Rapture in the wake of events from BioShock holds a philosophy of altruism that is based on historical figures Karl Marx and John Stuart Mill, along with modern figures such as Richard Dawkins. In comparison to BioShock's questions of free will and humans' destiny, BioShock 2's director Jordan Thomas said that the player character is "almost the ultimate individual" whom Lamb goads to fulfill her goals. Professor Ryan Lizardi draws parallels between BioShock 2's themes of community versus the individual and the issues of McCarthyism and the hippie movement that occurred around the time period of the game's setting. "As this sequel is an extension of the first game's storylines and characters, there are direct contrasts between the extreme politics of Andrew Ryan's objectivism and the extreme religion/politics of Lamb's collectivism", he writes. "BioShock 2 specifically asks players to question all sides of debates when extreme stances are taken, and asks players to weigh their decisions in an alternate and complex history."

BioShock Infinite used the concept of American exceptionalism as the basis for its setting of the floating city of Columbia at the turn of the 20th century. In capturing this period, Levine said that the game included aspects of racism, white supremacy and white nationalism, and other political and social issues as they were at that point in time, not to make a statement in regards to these areas but that it would be "strange" and "dishonest" to not include them. Levine considered the presentation of these elements in the game as simply historical, and invited players to derive any interpretation in meaning from them themselves. Separately, BioShock Infinite explores concepts related to multiple realities and "constants and variables", and understanding the impacts of free will, choice and consequences on one's actions.

== Games ==
Release timeline
2007	BioShock
2008	BioShock: Challenge Rooms
2009
2010	BioShock 2
2010	BioShock 2: Minerva's Den
2011
2012	BioShock: Industrial Revolution
2013	BioShock Infinite
2013	Infinite: Clash in the Clouds
2013	Infinite: Burial at Sea Episode 1
2014	Infinite: Burial at Sea Episode 2
2015
2016	BioShock: The Collection

=== BioShock (2007) ===
BioShock was released on August 21, 2007, for Microsoft Windows and Xbox 360. A PlayStation 3 port was released on October 17, 2008. The game was critically very well received, with positive reviews that praised its "morality-based" storyline, immersive environment and Ayn Rand-inspired dystopian back-story. According to Take-Two's chairman Strauss Zelnick, the game has sold around 3 million copies as of June 2009.

BioShock takes place in 1960, in the fictional underwater city of Rapture. Built in the late 1940s by business tycoon Andrew Ryan, it was meant to be a laissez-faire social environment for individuals to work, live, and prosper out of the increasingly oppressive hands of the world's governments and authorities. Dr. Brigid Tenenbaum, Dr. Yi Suchong, and other scientists discovered a substance called ADAM, harvested from sea slugs that could be made into plasmids that gave the user psychokinetic powers. Frank Fontaine, a former gangster and businessman who brought black market goods to Rapture, found a way to harvest ADAM by implanting the slugs in the bodies of young girls, "Little Sisters", and profited from this. Ryan led an attack that apparently killed Fontaine and seized his ADAM production facilities. To protect the Little Sisters, Ryan created Big Daddies by conditioning and mutating humans into armored diving suits. Leading up to New Year's Eve 1959, a new figure, Atlas, rose from the worker classes to lead a revolt against Ryan, killing many and leading Ryan to mutate a number of his followers into Splicers to protect himself, creating the downfall of Rapture's utopia.

In 1960, Jack, the player-character, is in a plane crash over the ocean that is near the lighthouse which houses a bathysphere that takes him to Rapture. Atlas contacts Jack to ask his help against Ryan's forces. Jack discovers the Little Sisters and is warned by Tenenbaum not to harm them. After fighting through the failing city, Jack makes it to Ryan's offices. Ryan, patiently playing golf while waiting for Jack, reveals that Jack is his illegitimate son, and had been mentally conditioned by Fontaine to coerce his actions, specifically following any order preceded by the phrase "Would you kindly...?". Jack realizes Atlas has been using this phrase since his arrival. Ryan accepts his fate, using the phrase to make Jack kill him with a golf club, and Atlas reveals himself as Fontaine, having gone into hiding to plan a new strategy against Ryan. Fontaine leaves Jack to die, but he is rescued by Tenenbaum and the Little Sisters. Tenenbaum removes the conditioning from Jack's mind and urges him to defeat Fontaine and take the Little Sisters to the surface. In a final battle against Jack, Fontaine injects himself with numerous plasmids. Jack and the Little Sisters overpower him, allowing for them to escape.

=== BioShock 2 (2010) ===
With the critical and commercial success of BioShock, 2K formed a new studio, 2K Marin, to produce a followup. Jordan Thomas, level designer on the first BioShock, served as creative director, and was one of several Irrational Games members to join the new effort. 2K Australia, Arkane Studios, and Digital Extremes providing additional support. BioShock 2 takes place eight years after the events of BioShock where a new leader, Sofia Lamb, has risen up in the power vacuum after the death of Ryan and Fontaine, and has created a collectivist cult of personality. Prior to the events of BioShock, Lamb used mind control to have the Big Daddy Delta (the player-character) commit suicide, thus severing the physiological bond between him and her daughter Eleanor, the Little Sister he was assigned to protect. Delta is resurrected ten years later by Tenenbaum and the Little Sisters and is told that unless he re-establishes his bond with Eleanor soon, he will fall into a coma or die once more. Delta fights his way through Splicers as well as those loyal to Lamb, defeats Lamb, and sacrifices himself to help Eleanor, Tenenbaum, and other Little Sisters to escape Rapture. The game features a multiplayer component, set during the civil war before the events of the first game, and featured downloadable content, including a single-player expansion, BioShock 2: Minerva's Den.

BioShock 2 was released worldwide on February 9, 2010. It was critically praised, though not as highly as BioShock, and sold more than three million copies, though its performance was considered disappointing by 2K.

=== BioShock Infinite (2013) ===
BioShock Infinite was announced on August 12, 2010, for release on Microsoft Windows, PlayStation 3 and Xbox 360 systems on February 26, 2013; on December 7, 2012, Irrational Games announced that release would be delayed by another month, to March 26, 2013. Previously known as "Project Icarus", BioShock Infinite is not a direct sequel or prequel to the original game, but carries many of the same gameplay concepts from the BioShock title.

BioShock Infinite takes place in 1912 in Columbia, a city suspended in the air through "quantum levitation", built and launched in 1893 by the American government during the World's Columbian Exposition in Chicago, to much fanfare and publicity. However, it was later involved in an "international incident" by firing upon a group of Chinese civilians during the Boxer Rebellion. After being ordered to return to American soil, Columbia seceded from the United States and relocated above the clouds, with its whereabouts unknown to the world. As with Rapture, Columbia's intellectuals were able to develop new technology, including Vigors that grant the user new psychokinetic powers. At the same time, strange rifts in the space-time continuum called "Tears" appear across the city, and anachronistic elements can be seen and heard.

The player-character, Booker DeWitt, a disgraced member of the Pinkerton National Detective Agency discharged after his actions at the Wounded Knee Massacre, is sent to Columbia by Robert and Rosalind Lutece (the Lutece twins) to recover Elizabeth, a young woman that had been kidnapped by Columbia's leader, Zachary Comstock, and protected by the robotic Songbird. Booker rescues Elizabeth (who subsequently accompanies the player as an AI-controller ally), who appears to have control over the Tears. Their escape is hampered by fighting between the Founders, those loyal to Comstock, and the Vox Populi, residents of Columbia who have faced persecution. Booker comes to discover that Elizabeth is his daughter and that Comstock is a version of himself from one of numerous parallel universes whom had accepted a baptism to atone for his actions at Wounded Knee and established the beliefs that led to Columbia's founding. Comstock had kidnapped Elizabeth from Booker while she was an infant with the help of Tear technology provided by the Lutece twins (in essence the same person from alternate dimensions), but in his escape, Elizabeth's finger was severed by the closure of a Tear, giving her the power over Tears. Booker eventually defeats Songbird and Comstock with the help of Elizabeth and the Twins, as Comstock had turned on them. Elizabeth shows Booker that these events will always repeat through the multitude of parallel universes, and the only way to end the cycle is to kill all versions of Booker before he can turn into Comstock at the baptism. Booker accepts this fate, allowing Elizabeth to drown him.

A downloadable content expansion, Burial at Sea, was released in two-parts on November 12, 2013, and March 25, 2014. Elizabeth finds one version of Comstock has ended up in the city of Rapture from BioShock, having reverted to his birth name of Booker DeWitt and working as a private detective. Elizabeth joins him as they search for a missing girl named Sally, but become caught up in the events of Atlas' war against Andrew Ryan. They find that scientists of Rapture have been working with those on Columbia through Rifts, sharing technology such as Plasmids and Vigors, and the Big Daddies and Songbird. After discovering Sally has already become a Little Sister, and losing her Rift-controlling powers, Elizabeth kills the last Comstock, and sacrifices herself to assure that Sally and the other Little Sisters can be rescued by Jack.

=== Other games ===
Pre-orders of BioShock Infinite granted the purchaser with an access code to a browser-based puzzle game, BioShock Infinite: Industrial Revolution, developed in conjunction with Lazy 8 Studios. Irrational had concerns developing a pre-release puzzle game to tie into the retail title. Several of the Irrational team had played and enjoyed Lazy 8's steampunk-like Independent Games Festival-winning title Cogs and considered using them to build this pre-release game. Irrational believed the studio would be able to develop a game that would provide "challenging puzzles in a steampunk style", according to Lazy 8's founder, Rob Jagnow. The game's mechanics are a simplified version of the Cogs puzzles, and involve creating devices from basic machines like gears and pulleys to achieve a specific action; the game contains 59 such puzzles culled from more than 70. Solving the steampunk-based puzzles grants the player unlockable items within the main BioShock Infinite game once it was released.

=== Future games ===
In February 2014, while promoting Burial at Sea: Episode Two, series director Ken Levine revealed that BioShock Infinite would be Irrational Games' last game in the BioShock series. Levine let go of most of the staff of Irrational Games in February 2017 and rebranded the division as Ghost Story Games within 2K Games to work on smaller narrative titles. The rights to BioShock remained with 2K. In a 2016 interview, Levine explained that the pressure and stress of managing a large team as he had to for Infinite had impacted his health and personal relationships, and rather than stay on to build a larger game, decided to leave the BioShock franchise.

Following Levine's decision, 2K Games stated that the BioShock series will continue, telling Game Informer they "look forward to exploring the next BioShock". In May 2014, 2K Games stated that work on the BioShock series was continuing with 2K Marin at the helm, despite the fact that in October 2013, 2K Marin had reportedly been shut down by 2K Games. It was reported that work on this title had started as early as 2015 at the Austin-based third-party studio Certain Affinity. However, by 2016, 2K decided to pull the project from Certain Affinity and bring it in-house, establishing a yet-to-be-named studio, as well as rebooting the development process. Previously, Kotaku had reported in 2018 that several employees from Hangar 13, another development studio within 2K Games, had joined a new studio in the San Francisco area and were working on a project known under the working title Parkside, believed by other Hangar 13 employees to be a BioShock title.

2K formally announced in December 2019 that a new BioShock title was under development but was still some years from release. The game is being developed by a new internal studio, Cloud Chamber, with offices based in San Francisco (2K Marin's old offices) and a newly established location in Montreal. The studio is led by Kelley Gilmore, who had previously worked at Firaxis. The lead staff include lead art director Scott Sinclair, who had worked on the first BioShock, Jonathan Pelling as design director having previously done level work for BioShock and Infinite, and Hogarth de la Plante as creative director after having worked on the other BioShock games in numerous roles. According to Jason Schreier of Bloomberg News, prior to August 2025, an internal review of the next BioShock game was not well received by 2K, leading to changes at Cloud Chamber leadership to improve the development of the game. By August 2025, Rod Fergusson was brought in to lead Cloud Chamber, as well as to oversee the overall BioShock franchise; Ferguson was previously brought in by 2K as a fixer near the end of BioShock Infinite's development to help get the game's troubled production back on track.

=== Collections ===
The games have been rereleased or repackaged in different configurations. BioShock: Ultimate Rapture Edition is a retail package containing BioShock and BioShock 2, along with all downloadable content for both games including Minerva's Den, and a set of stickers based on BioShock Infinite. The edition was released for the Xbox 360 and PlayStation 3 in North America on January 14, 2013. BioShock Infinite: The Complete Edition, released November 4, 2014, combined BioShock Infinite and its DLC, Clash in the Clouds and Burial at Sea, as well as pre-order bonuses and exclusive weapons. BioShock Infinite: The Complete Edition was released on November 4, 2014.

A remastered collection of the entire series, BioShock: The Collection, was released for PlayStation 4, Xbox One, and Microsoft Windows in September 2016. It features updated graphics and a documentary with commentary from Ken Levine and Shawn Robertson. The multiplayer component of BioShock 2 is not included in the collection. BioShock Infinite's original PC version was ported to console for the collection, but was not remastered since it met console standards. Players that own either of the first two games on Windows were able to update to the remastered versions for free. The Collection, as well as individual releases of the remastered games, were released for the Nintendo Switch on May 29, 2020.

=== Cancelled projects ===
A version of BioShock for the PlayStation Vita handheld console, tentatively known as BioShock Vita, was announced at the 2011 Electronic Entertainment Expo by Levine during Sony's press event alongside the introduction of the console. Levine later described the title as still in the works, a game that would neither be similar to the first two BioShock titles nor be a version of Infinite for the Vita. He stated that "I'd rather do something that's an experiment and that's a little different. And is unique for the franchise." By April 2012, with Irrational working heavily to finish Infinite, the Vita game was put on hold.

In interviews in December 2012, Levine revealed that little work had been done on the game, as the dealing with working with Sony was in the hands of Irrational's publisher, Take-Two Interactive, though he was still interested in the title. Levine revealed in July 2014 that the deals between Sony and Take-Two had failed to materialize, and the game was unlikely to be made, despite Sony being bullish on promoting the future title at its Vita reveal before any development work had been started. He further clarified that his idea would have been a strategy-style game similar to Final Fantasy Tactics, with the game set prior to the fall of Rapture.

== Other media ==
A BioShock novel and a short story have been released. BioShock: Rapture, a prequel to the first BioShock written by John Shirley, was published by Titan books on July 19, 2011. BioShock Infinite: Mind in Revolt is a short story written by Joe Fielder with Ken Levine, offering insight to the world of Columbia and the motivations of Daisy Fitzroy, the leader of the Vox Populi. Mind in Revolt had an e-book release on February 13, 2013, with the hardcover version released later through the Irrational Games store. Other print media includes art books for all three games: BioShock: Breaking the Mold (2007), Deco Devolution: The Art of BioShock 2 (2010), and The Art of BioShock Infinite (2013).

=== Music ===
The orchestral scores for BioShock, BioShock 2, and BioShock Infinite were composed by Garry Schyman. Schyman's music combines the influence of early 20th century classical music, aleatoric music, and musique concrete. With the return to Rapture in BioShock 2, Schyman had the opportunity to revisit the setting, writing new music while retaining some elements and motifs from the first game, such as solo violins and mid-20th century compositional techniques. While expectations were higher, Schyman noted having played the original game and using an established style made the process easier. For Infinite, Schyman had to create a new soundscape evocative of the earlier era. Feeling that classical music of the time felt much more European than American, he opted to use less full orchestration and simpler string arrangements instead. In addition to the score, the BioShock series uses licensed period music as diegetic sound. For BioShock 2, more blues and religious music was included as it related to the sequel's themes. Infinite features anachronistic covers of popular pop songs, such as Cyndi Lauper's "Girls Just Want to Have Fun" and a barbershop quartet version of the Beach Boys' "God Only Knows".

Roughly a quarter of the BioShock soundtrack was released on the internet, with an EP featuring remixes of the game's music included in the Limited Edition of the game. BioShock's full soundtrack was released on a vinyl LP with the BioShock 2 Special Edition in 2010. The scores for BioShock 2 and Infinite were included in limited editions of their respective games.

=== Film adaptations ===
Industry rumors after the game's release suggested a film adaptation of the game would be made, utilizing similar green screen filming techniques as in the movie 300 to recreate the environments of Rapture. On May 9, 2008, Take-Two Interactive announced a deal with Universal Studios to produce a BioShock movie, to be directed by Gore Verbinski and written by John Logan. The film was expected to be released in 2010, but was put on hold due to budget concerns. On August 24, 2009, it was revealed that Verbinski had dropped out of the project due to the studio's decision to film overseas to keep the budget under control. Verbinski reportedly feels this would have hindered his work on Rango. Then Juan Carlos Fresnadillo was in talks to direct with Verbinski as producer.

In January 2010 the project was in the pre-production stage, with director Juan Carlos Fresnadillo and Braden Lynch, a voice artist from BioShock 2 both working on the film. By July, the film was facing budget issues, but producer Gore Verbinski said they were working it out. He also said the film would be a hard R. Ken Levine, during an interview on August 30, 2010, said: "I will say that it is still an active thing and it's something we are actively talking about and actively working on." Verbinski later cited that by trying to maintain the "R" rating, they were unable to find any studios that would back the effort, putting the film's future in jeopardy.

Levine confirmed in March 2013 that the film had been officially canceled. Levine stated that after Warner's Watchmen film in 2009 did not do as well as the studio expected, they had concerns with the $200 million budget that Verbinski had for the BioShock film. They asked him to consider doing the film on a smaller $80 million budget, but Verbinski did not want to accept this. In February 2017, Verbinski said that his crew was about eight weeks from starting filming, with plans for many elaborate sets given that the setting of Rapture could not be something easily shot on existing locations, requiring the $200 million budget. Verbinski was anticipating on releasing the film with an R-rating when Universal approached him about changing the film's direction. Universal requested that he tone down the film and aim instead for a PG-13 movie, which would be able to draw more audiences to the film and recoup the larger budget he asked for. Verbinski insisted on keeping the R-rating and refused the smaller budget Universal offered to make the R-rated version. Universal felt that expensive a film with the limited R-rating would be too much of a risk, and pulled him from the film. Universal then subsequently brought in a new director to work with the smaller budget, but Levine and 2K Games did not feel that the new director was a good fit with the material. Universal then let Levine decide to end the project, which he did, believing that the film would not work with the current set of compromises they would have had to make.

In January 2014, artwork from the canceled film surfaced online, showing what an adaptation could have looked like. Verbinski said that there is "all kinds of crazy stuff" from the pre-production stage that still exists, such as screen tests for characters. He noted in the 2017 Reddit piece that with the success of the 2016 film Deadpool, he believes that there is now justification for his vision of the BioShock film. Filmmaker Guillermo del Toro had stated in 2017 he'd love to see an adaption of BioShock after hearing of Verbinski's departure. He wanted to use similar principles as he had used for planned Insane video game, but this approach led to "contentious" and "disastrous" discussions with the studios that the project never got anywhere beyond a few phone calls, according to an interview in 2026.

==== Netflix film adaptation ====
In February 2022, Netflix announced it would be adapting the BioShock franchise into a film with Vertigo Entertainment and 2K, a subsidiary of Take-Two Interactive Software, Inc producing. Francis Lawrence was slated to direct with Michael Green to write, as of August 2022. Green and Lawrence were collaborating on a new draft as of October 2023. While producer Roy Lee affirmed the work was still in development during the 2024 San Diego Comic Con, he said that changes at Netflix management reduced the budget for the BioShock film, so they have reworked the film; "It's going to be a more personal point of view, as opposed to a grander, big project", Lee said. In May 2025, Lawrence said that the film was still in active development with a new draft of the screenplay just finished by Justin Rhodes. Lee later said that production likely will not start until after Lawrence finished directing The Hunger Games: Sunrise on the Reaping.

== Reception and legacy ==
Aggregate review scores
Game	Metacritic
BioShock	(X360) 96/100 (PC) 96/100 (PS3) 94/100
BioShock 2	(X360) 88/100 (PC) 88/100 (PS3) 88/100
BioShock Infinite	(PS3) 94/100 (PC) 94/100 (X360) 93/100

The series has received critical acclaim for its morality-based storyline, immersive environments, and unique settings. It is commonly listed among both audiences and critics as one of the greatest video game series of all time and a demonstration of video game as an art form. The original's plot twist, where the player discovers that the player-character Jack has been coerced into events by the trigger phrase, "Would you kindly...", is considered one of the strongest narrative elements of recent games, in part that it subverted the expectation that the player has control and influence on the game.

In February 2011 the Smithsonian Institution announced it would be holding an exhibit dedicated to the art of video games. Several games were chosen initially and the public could vote for which games they felt deserved to be displayed via a poll on the exhibit's website. BioShock was considered a front runner to be displayed because of its status as a game that demonstrated how artistic the medium can be. John Lanchester of the London Review of Books recognized BioShock as one of the first video games to break into coverage of mainstream media to be covered as a work of art arising from its narrative aspects, whereas before video games had failed to enter into the "cultural discourse", or otherwise covered due to moral controversies they created. Peter Suderman for Vox in 2016 wrote that BioShock was the first game that demonstrated that video games could be a work of art, particularly highlighting that the game plays on the theme of giving the illusion of individual control.
