= 2K Marin =

American video game developer

2K Marin, Inc.
- Type: Subsidiary
- Industry: Video games
- Founded: December 17, 2007; 18 years ago
- Defunct: October 17, 2013
- Headquarters: Novato, California, US
- Parent: 2K

2K Marin, Inc. was an American video game developer based in Novato, California. Founded in December 2007 as a spin-off from their parent, 2K, the company developed BioShock 2 (2010) and The Bureau: XCOM Declassified (2013) before laying off or relocating all staff in October 2013 and silently being closed.

== History ==
The formation of 2K Marin was announced on December 17, 2007. The studio was spun out of 2K, a publishing subsidiary of Take-Two Interactive, to develop a second installment in the BioShock series, following disputes with Ken Levine, the director of the first game.

In April 2010, for the development of XCOM (later The Bureau: XCOM Declassified), sister studio 2K Australia adopted the 2K Marin name. The studio dropped the 2K Marin label in November 2011 and returned to the previous 2K Australia name, this time for BioShock Infinite.

On October 17, 2013, 2K announced that 2K Marin had been hit with massive staff reductions, laying off the majority of employees. All remaining developers were to be shifted to an unnamed 2K studio founded with Rod Fergusson. That studio, like 2K Marin based in Novato, was announced by Fergusson in September that year. Some former employees agreed that 2K Marin was "essentially closed" due to these layoffs, as the employee count had sunk to zero. 2K Marin was shut down silently, and the closure has not been publicly acknowledged by 2K.

Despite this, Take-Two Interactive's chairman and chief executive officer, Strauss Zelnick, stated in May 2014 that 2K Marin was still active, and that future BioShock games would be developed at the studio. 2K later announced in December 2019 that the new BioShock game was being developed by a new internal studio, Cloud Chamber, which had taken over the old 2K Marin spaces.

== Games developed ==
| Year | Title | Platform(s) | Notes |
|---|---|---|---|
| 2008 | BioShock | PlayStation 3 | Ported only; game developed by 2K Boston and 2K Australia |
| 2010 | BioShock 2 | Microsoft Windows, PlayStation 3, Xbox 360 | —N/a |
| 2013 | The Bureau: XCOM Declassified | Microsoft Windows, PlayStation 3, Xbox 360 | —N/a |
