= Cloud Chamber (company) =

American video game developer

- Type: Division
- Founded: December 9, 2019; 6 years ago
- Founder: Kelley Gilmore
- Headquarters: Novato, California, US
- Number of locations: 2 studios (2019)
- Key people: Rod Fergusson (studio head)
- Parent: 2K
- Website: cloudchamberstudios.com

Cloud Chamber is an American video game developer and studio of 2K based in Novato, California, with a second studio in Montréal, Québec. Created on December 9, 2019, the company is developing the next entry in the BioShock series.

== History ==
On December 9, 2019, 2K announced that it had set up a new studio with offices in Novato, California and Montréal, Québec with Kelley Gilmore, former executive producer for Firaxis Games (another 2K studio). Cloud Chamber is currently working on a new entry in the BioShock series. Several members that were part of the original BioShock game are part of the studio, including Hoagy de la Plante, Scott Sinclair, and Jonathan Pelling. Kelley said the focus of their studio is to "create yet-to-be-discovered worlds – and their stories within – that push the boundaries of what is possible in the video game medium".

In August 2025, following a failed review of the upcoming BioShock game, Kelley Gilmore was fired. Former BioShock Infinite producer Rod Fergusson was brought in as a replacement, as well as to oversee the BioShock franchise. Alongside this, an unspecified number of staff were laid off from Cloud Chamber.

== Games developed ==
Year	Title	Platform(s)
TBA	Untitled BioShock game	TBA
