= 2K Australia =

Australian video game developer

2K Australia Pty Ltd
- Formerly: Irrational Games Australia Pty. Ltd. (2000–2007); 2K Marin (2010–2011)
- Type: Subsidiary
- Industry: Video games
- Founded: 27 April 2000; 26 years ago
- Defunct: 15 April 2015
- Fate: Dissolved
- Headquarters: Canberra, Australia
- Parent: Irrational Games (2000–2007); 2K (2007–2015)

2K Australia Pty Ltd (formerly Irrational Games Australia and 2K Marin) was an Australian video game developer based in Canberra. The company was founded as Irrational Games Australia, a subsidiary of Irrational Games, in April 2000. Irrational Games Australia and its parent were acquired by Take-Two Interactive in January 2006, with Irrational Games being placed under the 2K label. The two Irrational Games studio were split apart in August 2007, wherefore Irrational Games Australia became 2K Australia. Furthermore, 2K Australia operated under the name of sister studio 2K Marin between April 2010 and November 2011, and was finally shut down in April 2015.

== History ==
Irrational Games Australia was founded on 27 April 2000 as a subsidiary of Irrational Games. On 9 January 2006, Take-Two Interactive announced that they acquired Irrational Games, including Irrational Games Australia, and placed it under their 2K label. On 10 August 2007, shortly prior to the release of BioShock, the two Irrational Games studios were split apart, with Irrational Games becoming 2K Boston, and Irrational Games Australia turning into 2K Australia.

For the development of XCOM (later The Bureau: XCOM Declassified) in April 2010, 2K Australia started operating under the name of 2K Marin, another 2K studio. On 28 February 2011, 2K Australia's studio head, Martin Slater, abruptly left the company. On 20 October 2011, layoffs hit 2K Marin's Australian studio, with 15 jobs cut. Following the layoffs, on 28 November 2011, it was reported that the studio had dropped the 2K Marin label, and was working under their 2K Australia brand name again, this time on BioShock Infinite.

Jonathan Chey, who had led the company as studio head, left 2K Australia by July 2011, when he founded his own game development studio, Blue Manchu. On 15 April 2015, 2K Australia was shut down and all staff were made redundant, stating that the costs of operating a studio in Australia were too high. At the time of its closure, 2K Australia was considered to have been the last AAA video game company in Australia.

== Games developed ==
=== As Irrational Games Australia ===
Year	Title	Platform(s)	Notes
2002	Freedom Force	Microsoft Windows	Assisted Irrational Games
2004	Tribes: Vengeance	Microsoft Windows	Assisted Irrational Games
2005	SWAT 4	Microsoft Windows	Assisted Irrational Games
2006	SWAT 4: The Stetchkov Syndicate	Microsoft Windows	Assisted Irrational Games

=== As 2K Australia ===
Year	Title	Platform(s)	Notes
2007	BioShock	iOS, macOS, Microsoft Windows, PlayStation 3, Xbox 360	Co-developed with 2K Boston
2010	BioShock 2	macOS, Microsoft Windows, PlayStation 3, Xbox 360	Co-developed with 2K Marin
2013	BioShock Infinite	Linux, macOS, Microsoft Windows, PlayStation 3, Xbox 360	Assisted Irrational Games
2013	The Bureau: XCOM Declassified	macOS, Microsoft Windows, PlayStation 3, Xbox 360	Assisted 2K Marin
2014	Borderlands: The Pre-Sequel	Android, Linux, macOS, Microsoft Windows, PlayStation 3, Xbox 360	Co-developed with Gearbox Software
