= Ken Levine (game developer) =

American video game developer (born 1966)

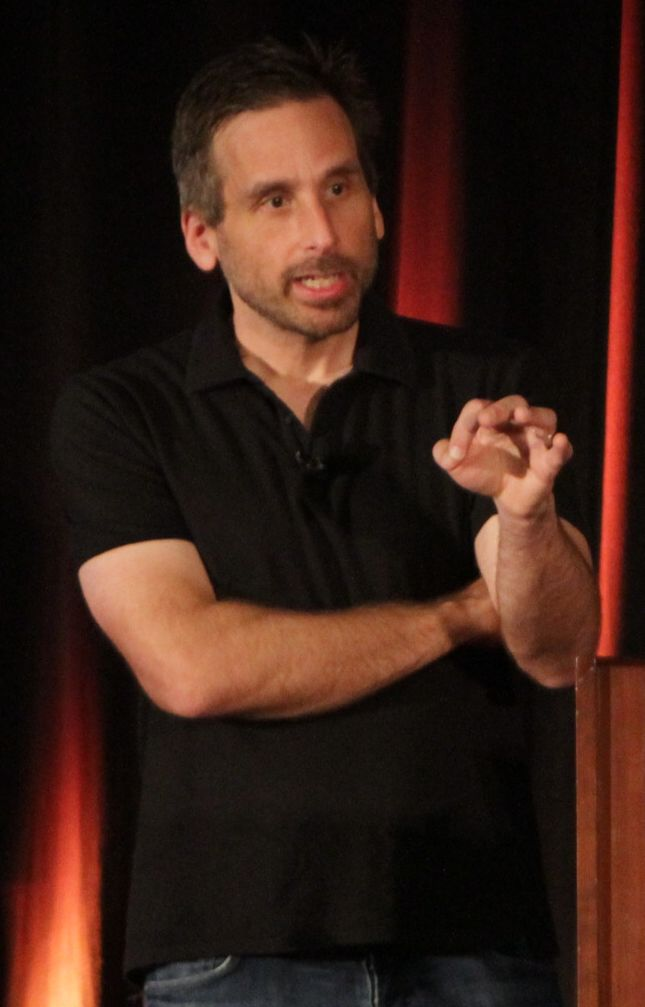
- Levine at the 2014 Game Developers Conference
- Born: Kenneth M. Levine; September 1, 1966 (age 60); Flushing, New York, U.S.
- Education: Vassar College (AB)
- Occupations: Video game designer, creative director, author, screenwriter
- Known for: BioShock; BioShock Infinite; Freedom Force; System Shock 2 Thief: The Dark Project

Kenneth M. Levine (born September 1, 1966) is an American video game developer. He is the creative director and co-founder of Ghost Story Games (formerly known as Irrational Games). He led the creation of the BioShock series and is also known for his work on System Shock 2.

Levine was named one of the "Storytellers of the Decade" by Game Informer and was the 1UP Network's 2007 person of the year. In 2009, he was chosen by IGN as one of the top 100 game creators of all time. He received the inaugural Golden Joystick "Lifetime Achievement Award" for his work.

== Career ==
=== Early life ===
Levine was born in Flushing, New York, to a Jewish family. Raised in Upper Saddle River, New Jersey, Levine graduated from Northern Highlands Regional High School.

He studied drama at Vassar College, graduating with a Bachelor of Arts degree in drama in 1988 in Poughkeepsie, New York before moving to Los Angeles to pursue a film career, writing two screenplays.

Before he got into gaming, Levine worked as a computer consultant on Wall Street but admitted he was not very good at it, describing his attitude towards the job as a "slacker".

=== Looking Glass ===
In 1995, Levine was hired as a game designer by Cambridge, Massachusetts-based Looking Glass Studios after replying to a job ad in Next Generation magazine. At Looking Glass, he worked with pioneering designer Doug Church to establish the initial fiction and design of Thief: The Dark Project.

=== Irrational Games ===
In 1997, following his work on Thief, Levine left Looking Glass along with two coworkers, Jonathan Chey and Robert Fermier, to found Irrational Games. The studio's first game was System Shock 2, an early hybrid of a role-playing game and first-person shooter. It is the sequel to Looking Glass' System Shock (1994). Levine served as lead writer and designer, and the game shipped in 1999 to critical acclaim.

Irrational Games developed Freedom Force and its sequel Freedom Force vs the 3rd Reich, real-time tactical role-playing games that drew heavily on the love Levine and Irrational Games's artist Robb Waters had for the Silver Age of Comic Books. After the first Freedom Force game, Irrational developed the first-person shooters Tribes: Vengeance and SWAT 4, on which Levine served as writer and executive producer respectively.

Although Tribes: Vengeance, SWAT 4, and Third Reich all shipped within a year of one another in 2004 and 2005, Irrational Games had been working in preproduction on the first-person shooter BioShock, the studio's most ambitious game at that point, since 2002. The game went through numerous revisions to its premise and gameplay, and was released in August 2007. In 2005, Levine, Chey, and Fermier sold Irrational Games to publisher Take-Two Interactive. Take-Two Interactive changed their name to 2K, just as BioShock was released. BioShock was a critical and commercial success, and is considered one of the best video games of all time. The BioShock franchise has sold over 25 million units to date.

In 2008, Levine delivered the keynote address at the Penny Arcade Expo in Seattle, discussing his youth as a nerd in the 1970s and how it impacted the path of his career.

Since the release of BioShock, Levine served as creative director and lead writer on BioShock Infinite, set in 1912 in the floating city of Columbia. BioShock Infinite was a critical and commercial success, winning over 80 awards pre-release.

In February 2014, Levine announced that Irrational Games would be closing down, with fifteen members of the staff to follow Levine to focus on digital only, narrative-driven games for Take-Two. He stated in a 2016 interview that the stress of managing Infinite's development had affected his health and personal relationships, and rather than stay on to lead an even larger BioShock game, opted to depart from it.

=== Ghost Story Games ===
On February 23, 2017, Irrational Games was rebranded as Ghost Story Games, founded by 12 of the former Irrational members with Levine remaining as president and creative director. In January 2022, the studio's game was reported to be in development hell, with employees blaming Levine for a lack of leadership in producing a vaguely pitched game that Levine described as a "narrative LEGO" in which every player would have a unique experience. On December 8, 2022, they revealed their game, the first-person shooter Judas.

== Work as an author and screenwriter ==
Levine has been a consultant and co-author of three books related to the BioShock franchise. These are BioShock: Rapture, BioShock Infinite: Mind in Revolt and The Art of BioShock Infinite. He himself did not work on the majority of Rapture and Mind in Revolt, but provided the intellectual property and quotes used by the authors in the books. The author for Rapture was John Shirley and the author for Mind in Revolt was Joe Fielder. Levine personally wrote an introduction in the deluxe edition of The Art of BioShock Infinite, published by Dark Horse Comics.

In June 2013, Levine had been confirmed to be writing the script for a new film version of the dystopian science fiction novel Logan's Run. However, he was later dropped from the project.

In April 2016, Levine stated he was working with Interlude to write and produce the pilot episode for an interactive, live-action series based on The Twilight Zone, which will be published by CBS. However, as of January 2022, nothing has come to fruition. In 2017, Levine described the project as "in flux".

== Notable works ==
Levine is most notable for his conceptualization and work on the BioShock franchise. He and his team worked on BioShock and BioShock Infinite, passing on the opportunity to make BioShock 2.

BioShock is set in 1960, where the player controls a man named Jack who is the sole survivor of a plane crash near a mysterious lighthouse in the mid-Atlantic. Jack finds a bathysphere and takes the submersible down to an underwater city called Rapture, a city that was dedicated to the pursuit of a perfect free market economy. The city has fallen into ruin due to the city's social implosion and Jack must find a way to survive against the crazed inhabitants and escape.

BioShock Infinite is set in 1912, where main protagonist Booker DeWitt must travel to Columbia, a flying city that has no fixed location, and rescue a girl named Elizabeth and bring her back to New York. No motivation is given as to why Booker must do this except the cryptic words "Bring us the girl, and wipe away the debt." Booker arrives at Columbia to find an American-Exceptionalist city dedicated to hailing the Founding Fathers that is led by a religious zealot known as Father Comstock.

== Style and themes ==
Levine is known for creating narrative-driven games that explore sociological and philosophical themes. He selects dynamic art styles for use in his games, such as art deco, steampunk and frontierism.

Levine has explored concepts ranging from racial commentary to metaphysics with his games and emphasizes the storytelling aspect of gaming. He has cited Mad Men, the Coen brothers, and Stanley Kubrick as some of his influences.

== Personal life ==
While Levine considers himself culturally Jewish, he does not follow Judaism, and considers himself an atheist. He played Oscar Madison in a high school production of "The Odd Couple."

== List of works ==
Name	Year	Credited with	Publisher
Looking Glass Studios
Thief: The Dark Project	1998	Initial design and story concepts	Eidos Interactive
Irrational Games
System Shock 2	1999	Lead design, writing dialogue, story, voiceovers	Electronic Arts
Freedom Force	2002	Freedom Force team, voices	Electronic Arts, Crave Entertainment
Tribes: Vengeance	2004	Writer	Vivendi Games
Freedom Force vs the 3rd Reich	2005	Writer	Electronic Arts, 2K Games
SWAT 4	2005	Executive producer	Vivendi Games, Sierra Entertainment
BioShock	2007	Story, writing, creative direction	2K Games, Feral Interactive
BioShock Infinite	2013	Lead writer, creative director	2K Games, Aspyr
BioShock Infinite: Burial at Sea	2013/2014	Lead writer, creative director	2K Games, Aspyr
Ghost Story Games
Judas	TBA	Creative director	Ghost Story Games
