= Irrational Games =

American video game developer

- Formerly: Irrational Games; (1997–2007, 2009–2014); 2K Boston; (2007–2009)
- Type: Subsidiary
- Industry: Video games
- Founded: 1997; 29 years ago
- Founder: Ken Levine; Jonathan Chey; Robert Fermier
- Defunct: 2014; 12 years ago
- Fate: Closed
- Successor: Ghost Story Games
- Headquarters: Westwood, Massachusetts, US
- Key people: Ken Levine (creative director)
- Number of employees: 300 (2014)
- Parent: 2K (2006–2014)

Irrational Games (known as 2K Boston between 2007 and 2009) was an American video game developer which started in 1997 formed from three former Looking Glass Studios employees: Ken Levine, Jonathan Chey, and Robert Fermier. Take-Two Interactive acquired them in 2006. They were best known for two of the games in the BioShock series, as well as System Shock 2, Tribes: Vengeance, Freedom Force, and SWAT 4. Following the release of BioShock Infinite, Levine left the AAA industry in 2014 to work on smaller, narrative games. He started a smaller studio within Take-Two with some Irrational employees, later named Ghost Story Games, while Take-Two closed down Irrational Games.

== History ==
=== Formation and initial games (1997-2005) ===
Irrational Games was formed in 1997 by Ken Levine, Jonathan Chey, and Robert Fermier, former Looking Glass Studios employees that left on good terms to start their own game development firm. They initially ran on a shoestring budget, running out of Levine's apartment. At that time, as a small studio, they were dependent on publisher support; their first project was to develop a single-player campaign for the game FireTeam, being published by Multitude, Inc., but within three weeks, Multitude decided to drop the single-player campaign, leaving the three without any job.

They returned to Looking Glass looking for any opportunities. Looking Glass founder Paul Neurath agreed to give them a small budget, an office within their studio, and gave them the opportunity to work on a sequel to System Shock. System Shock 2 was released in 1999, and while a critical success, it did not reach sales expectations. After System Shock 2 was released, Chey returned to Australia while Fermier went to Ensemble Studios. Irrational continue to work with Looking Glass to create Deep Cover, a project inspired by Thief: The Dark Project set during the Cold War, though this was eventually cancelled around 2000.

Irrational returned to seeking other projects from other publishers to be more independent from Looking Glass. They landed work with Crave Entertainment, from which they started work on The Lost, a third-person action game inspired by Dante's Inferno, that was targeting the PlayStation 2. Levine described multiple difficulties with developing The Lost. One issue was handling technical issues with the game engine, as inititially they had planned to use the LithTech engine, but later switched to the Unreal Engine due to difficulties with making the game work on the PlayStation 2. A second problem arose as Crave started to have their own financial problems, and pushed on Irrational to continue development with a reduced budget. While Irrational finished most of the game, The Lost was eventually cancelled by 2002, with Irrational taking the loss on its development time.

During development of The Lost, Irrational started a second project with Crave, the turn-based superhero-theme Freedom Force. Chey, while still in Australia, returned to Irrational by setting up development offices in Australia in 2000, where most of the work on Freedom Force was completed. Crave's monetary issues led the game to be published in 2002 by the EA Partners label of Electronic Arts. The game performed moderately well, but failed to give Irrational any significant royalties.

Shortly after the cancellation of The Lost, Vivendi Games tapped Irrational to develop a single-player campaign based on the Tribes series, which had traditionally been multiplayer shooters in the past, and posed a challenge to craft a narrative around. This led to some difficulties with Vivendi, as at one point Levine was fired from the narrative position, replaced by two writers from Hollywood, only to be later rehired to complete the story. Tribes: Vengeance was eventually released in 2004. Irrational continued to work with Vivendi on a sequel in the Police Quest series, SWAT 4, released in 2005.

=== Acquisition by Take-Two and the BioShock series (2006-2013) ===
Since the release of System Shock 2, Levine had been trying to pitch a sequel to publishers without success. Starting around 2002, Levine led a small development team at Irrational to create BioShock, a game with a similar narrative approach and free-form approach as System Shock 2, using idea of having the player navigate through three factions, drones that carried a desirable resource, protectors that defended the drones, and harvesters that attempted to gain the resource from the drones. Irrational had difficulties selling this concept to publishers, as the concept of immersive sims like System Shock 2 was not considered profitable, but the company persisted and refined their ideas as word of a new immersive sim from Irrational began to spread in video game news coverage. In 2004, Take-Two Interactive offered to publish the game based on the core drone/protector/harvester concept, and then in 2006, acquired Irrational Games under its 2K publishing label. Just prior to the release of BioShock in 2007, Irrational Games' Boston and Australian offices were rebranded as 2K Boston and 2K Australia. BioShock released August 21 to wide critical acclaim and strong sales.

BioShock was released in August 2007, and was a critical and financial success. The game won several awards, and by 2013 had sold more than 4 million units. Due to the success of the game, tied to the former Irrational Games name, both of their studios reverted to the original Irrational name in January 2010.

Shortly after BioShock was released, rumors arose that many of the staff who had worked on the game were leaving 2K Boston/Australia. In 2007, five members of the 2K Boston team moved to a new 2K studio in Novato, California. Soon after, 2K announced the formation of 2K Marin in Novato.

Take-Two had pushed on Irrational to develop a BioShock sequel, but Levine was not interested, and instead initially sought to develop a new XCOM game. Take-Two assigned 2K Marin to develop BioShock 2. By 2008, when Irrational's contract with Take-Two was under review, Levine had lost interest in the XCOM project, and instead negotiated to develop a new BioShock game. The XCOM project work continued at 2K Marin, released in 2013 as The Bureau: XCOM Declassified.

Development on BioShock Infinite, what would be Irrational's last game, started in 2008, about half a year after completion of the original BioShock. Following the game's public announcement in 2010, the company was pressured by 2K Games and the gaming consumers to make sure the title lived up to the expectations that the promotional material had set for it. Irrational hired more staff and allocated work to additional studios to help with the game, but this only served to complicate matters; from post-mortem interviews with Irrational staff, Levine was continually changing some of the core story beats for the game, which would dramatically change game assets that had already developed. Levine also admitted to difficulties in managing the larger staff. Conflicts over development leadership led to the departure of some high-level individuals in 2012. To bring the game back onto schedule for release, 2K hired industry professionals to assist Levine in managing the large team and focusing the game's content including eliminating planned multiplayer modes. BioShock Infinite was released by March 2013.

=== Closure and transition to Ghost Story Games (2014-2017) ===
On February 18, 2014, Levine announced that the vast majority of the Irrational Games studio staff would be laid off, with all but fifteen members of the staff losing their positions. Levine said that he wanted to start "a smaller, more entrepreneurial endeavor at Take-Two," speaking to how much stress completing a large game like BioShock: Infinite had caused him. Levine said, "I need to refocus my energy on a smaller team with a flatter structure and a more direct relationship with gamers. In many ways, it will be a return to how we started: a small team making games for the core gaming audience." Levine had considered starting a new development studio for this, knowing that building the ideas would take several years before any game product would be made. Still, Take-Two offered to let him keep the division within Take-Two, with Levine saying that they told him, "there was no better place to pursue this new chapter than within their walls." Take-Two considered this studio separate from Irrational Games, preventing Levine from using the name, and shutting down Irrational Games shortly after Levine had made his decision in 2014. Around 15 developers continued with Levine at this new studio; the remaining 75 staff were laid off, though 2K offered a career fair to help find jobs for the displaced developers. According to Levine, in the years after the layoffs, several of the former Irrational staff had rejoined Take-Two and 2K under the studios that were working on a new BioShock title, though Levine himself was not involved.

By February 2017, Levine had announced the name of his new studio, Ghost Story Games, with the focus "to create immersive, story-driven games for people who love games that ask something of them".

== Games developed ==
=== As Irrational Games ===
Year	Title	Platform(s)	Publisher	Notes
1999	System Shock 2	Microsoft Windows	Electronic Arts	Co-developed with Looking Glass Studios
2002	Freedom Force	Microsoft Windows	Crave Entertainment	
2004	Tribes: Vengeance	Microsoft Windows	Sierra Entertainment	Assisted Irrational Games Canberra
2005	Freedom Force vs the 3rd Reich	Microsoft Windows	Vivendi Universal Games	Assisted Irrational Games Canberra
2005	SWAT 4	Microsoft Windows	Sierra Entertainment	
2006	SWAT 4: The Stetchkov Syndicate	Microsoft Windows	Sierra Entertainment	
2013	BioShock Infinite	Microsoft Windows	2K Games	
2013	BioShock Infinite	PlayStation 3	2K Games	
2013	BioShock Infinite	Xbox 360	2K Games	
2013	BioShock Infinite: Burial at Sea - Episode One	Microsoft Windows	2K Games	
2013	BioShock Infinite: Burial at Sea - Episode One	PlayStation 3	2K Games	
2013	BioShock Infinite: Burial at Sea - Episode One	Xbox 360	2K Games	
2014	BioShock Infinite: Burial at Sea - Episode Two	Microsoft Windows	2K Games	
2014	BioShock Infinite: Burial at Sea - Episode Two	PlayStation 3	2K Games	
2014	BioShock Infinite: Burial at Sea - Episode Two	Xbox 360	2K Games	

=== As 2K Boston ===
Year	Title	Platform(s)	Publisher
2007	BioShock	Microsoft Windows	2K Games
2007	BioShock	Xbox 360	2K Games
2008	BioShock	PlayStation 3	2K Games

=== Cancelled video games ===
- Deep Cover
- Division 9
- Dungeon Duel
- Monster Island
- The Lost
- Freedom Force 3
- Untitled BioShock game for PlayStation Vita
