= Oliver Vaquer =

American actor

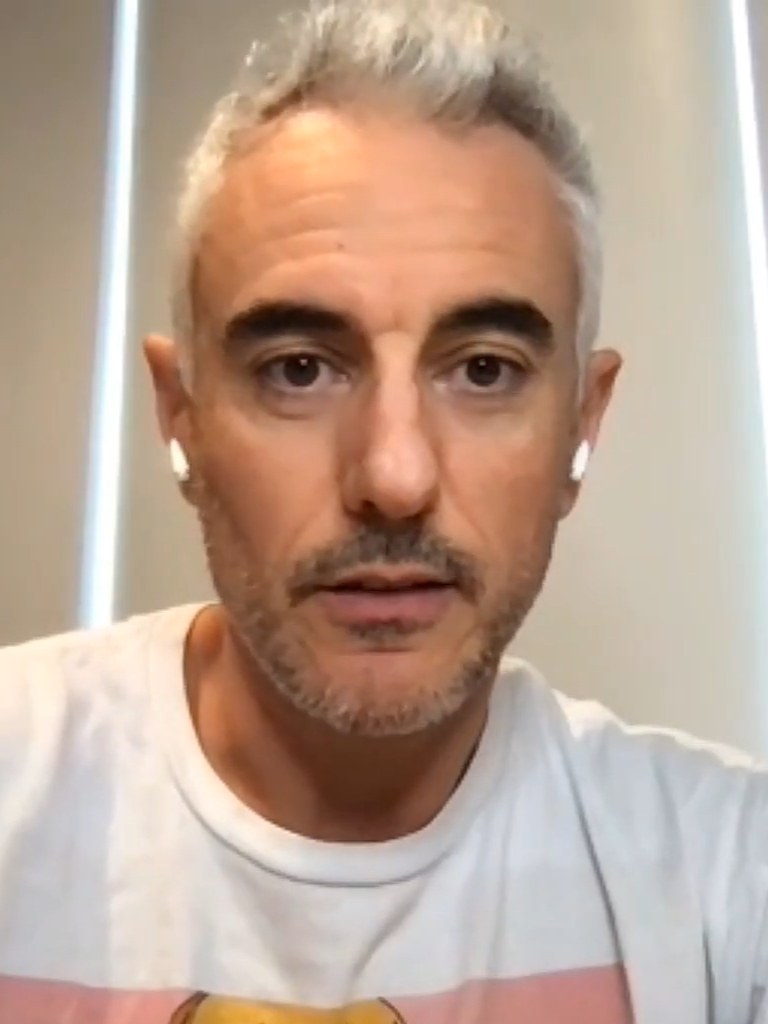
- Vaquer in 2022
- Occupations: Actor, podcaster
- Years active: 1998–present

Oliver Vaquer is an American actor and podcaster.

== Filmography ==
=== Film ===
Year	Title	Role	Notes
2002	Long Story Short	Jake	
2011	Ronal the Barbarian	Elric (voice)	English dub
2017	The Babymoon	Galiano	
2022	Rise of the Teenage Mutant Ninja Turtles: The Movie	Additional voices	

=== Television ===
Year	Title	Role	Notes
1999	Sex and the City	Waiter	Episode: "Games People Play"
2006	Six Degrees	Shopper	Episode: "What Are the Odds"
2010	Law & Order	Jack Nunez	Episode: "Love Eternal"
2012	Family Guy	Patrick Pewterschmidt (voice)	Episode: "Killer Queen"
2012	The Office	Doctor	Episode: "New Guys"
2012	Guys with Kids	Matt	Episode: "Thanksgiving"
2012	Dexter	Attorney	Episode: "Surprise, Motherfucker!"
2013	Arrested Development	Yurt Executive	Episode: "Borderline Personalities"; uncredited
2013	Save Me	Man	Episode: "WWJD"
2014	Transformers: Rescue Bots	Adult Cody Burns (voice)	Episode: "One for the Ages"
2014	Cosmos: A Space Odyssey	Joseph von Fraunhofer	Episode: "Hiding in the Light"
2014	Bad Judge	Jerk	Episode: "Meteor Shower"
2015–16	Jane the Virgin	Professor Blake	Recurring role (5 episodes)
2016	Guardians of the Galaxy	Karnak (voice)	Episode: "Inhuman Touch"
2016	Avengers Assemble	Karnak (voice)	Episode: "Inhumans Among Us"
2016–17	Justice League Action	Mister Mind (voice)	2 episodes
2017	Lopez	Jason Turner	2 episodes
2017–18	Andi Mack	Dr. Metcalf	3 episodes
2020	Rise of the Teenage Mutant Ninja Turtles	Various voices	3 episodes
2024	Max & the Midknights	Guards (voice)	Episode: "Meet the Midknights"

=== Video games ===
Year	Title	Role
2005	The Warriors	Dealer
2005	Grand Theft Auto: Liberty City Stories	DJ Boy Sanchez
2007	Manhunt 2	Project Victim
2010	Hydrophobia	Scoot
2013	BioShock Infinite	Robert Lutece
2014	Lichdom: Battlemage	5th Age Gryphon
2014	BioShock Infinite: Burial at Sea	Robert Lutece, additional voices
2014	Teenage Mutant Ninja Turtles	Donatello
2014	Infamous: First Light	Additional voices
2014	Skylanders: Trap Team	Rage Mage
2014	Game of Thrones: A Telltale Games Series	Rickard Morgryn
2015	Batman: Arkham Knight	Additional voices
2015	Skylanders: SuperChargers	Rage Mage
2016	Final Fantasy XV	Additional voices
2016	Star Wars: The Old Republic - Knights of the Eternal Throne	Additional voices
2017	Halo Wars 2	Additional voices
2017	Guardians of the Galaxy: The Telltale Series	Kree Guard #1, Priest, Shopkeeper
2017	Star Wars: Battlefront II	Ralsius Paldora
2017	Star Trek: Bridge Crew	Lieutenant Commander Velis
2018	Artifact	J'Muy, Prowler Vanguard
2019	Death Stranding	George Baton
2025	Dune: Awakening	Amarigo Mutelli, Atreides Landsraad Quartermaster
2026	Marathon	Valentin Cole
TBA	Deadlock	Seven
