= Will the Circle Be Unbroken? =

1907 song by Ada R. Habershon and Charles H. Gabriel

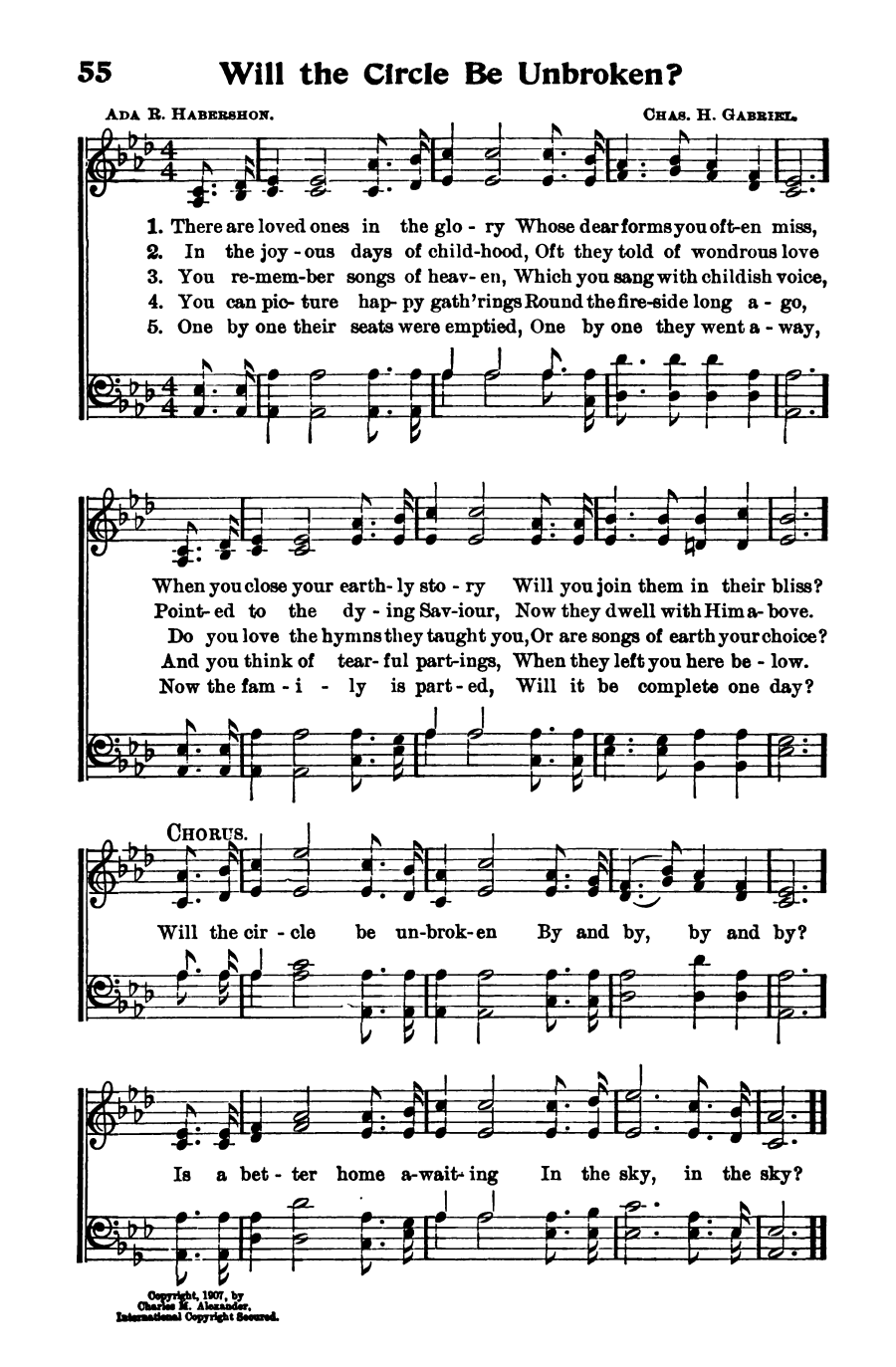
- Page from 1908 hymnal.

Song
- Language: English
- Written: 1907
- Published: April 30, 1907 by Charles M. Alexander, Chicago, Illinois
- Genre: Gospel; country folk
- Composer: Charles H. Gabriel
- Lyricist: Ada R. Habershon

"Will the Circle Be Unbroken?" is a popular Christian hymn written in 1907 by Ada R. Habershon with music by Charles H. Gabriel. The song is often recorded unattributed and, because of its age, has lapsed into the public domain. Most of the chorus appears in the later songs "Can the Circle Be Unbroken" and "Daddy Sang Bass".

== Lyrics ==
There are loved ones in the glory
Whose dear forms you often miss.
When you close your earthly story,
Will you join them in their bliss?
Will the circle be unbroken
By and by, by and by?
Is a better home awaiting
In the sky, in the sky?

In the joyous days of childhood
Oft they told of wondrous love
Pointed to the dying Saviour;
Now they dwell with Him above.

You remember songs of heaven
Which you sang with childish voice.
Do you love the hymns they taught you,
Or are songs of earth your choice?

You can picture happy gath'rings
Round the fireside long ago,
And you think of tearful partings
When they left you here below.
One by one their seats were emptied.
One by one they went away.
Now the family is parted.
Will it be complete one day?

The song is generally played to be uplifting to the congregation, and is a frequent standard in gospel revivals.

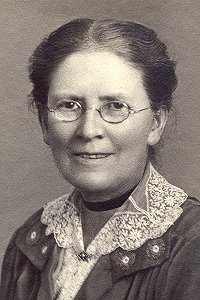
Ada R Habershon

== Other versions ==
=== Tune variants ===
The Ballad Index notes that the tune now commonly sung differs substantially from the original tune by Gabriel. It also notes the first known recording of this variant, by the Metropolitan Quartet in 1927.

=== Carter version ===
A reworked version of the song, intended as a funeral hymn, was written by A. P. Carter and released in 1935 by the Carter Family. The Carter version, titled "Can the Circle be Unbroken", uses the same music and the same verse structure but with different verse lyrics and a modified chorus. That version has often been recorded as "Will the Circle be Unbroken", including the 1972 performance by Mother Maybelle Carter and ensemble on the Nitty Gritty Dirt Band album of the same title.

The original version of the song does not insert "Lord" in lines 2 and 4 of the chorus, though the Carter version does. Also, the third line of the chorus is phrased as a question in the original, but as a declarative sentence in the Carter version, and the Carter version as written begins the chorus with 'Can' instead of 'Will'.

Inasmuch as the changes constitute substantial transformation and an original creative work, the Carter version is still under copyright.

=== Other versions ===
- In 1936, Bill and Charlie Monroe recorded yet a different version.
- In 1970, the music group The Doors performed an impromptu version live in Chicago, with vocalist Jim Morrison changing the lyrics to "oh, the circle has been broken, me oh my Lord, me oh my."
- In 1972, Ken Parker recorded a soul/reggae version of the song.
- In 1988, Spacemen 3 released a version of the song titled "May The Circle Be Unbroken" as one of the B-sides on their single "Revolution". Aside from the change in the titular line, it is lyrically identical to the Carter Family version.
- In 2013, Bioshock Infinite release an acoustic version with vocals by Courtnee Draper (voice actress for Elizabeth) and Guitar by Troy Baker (voice actor for Booker DeWitt). A shorter version and a choir version were seen in game, while both full versions were released on the soundtrack.
- In 2014, Randall Swiggum arranged a SATB version of the song for the Madison Youth Choirs.
- In 2024, Randal Swiggum released his SATB arrangement of Will The Circle Be Unbroken.

=== Parodies ===
- In 1994, Jello Biafra and Mojo Nixon included a parody "Will the Fetus Be Aborted?" on their album Prairie Home Invasion.
- In 1999, "Will the Turtle Be Unbroken," a parody, was written and released by Les Barker under the group name The Mrs Ackroyd Band.

== Recordings ==
- In 1959, George Jones released a recording of the song on the Mercury album Country Church Time. (MG20462, LP, Mono, Black Label)
- In 1960, The Staple Singers released their first recording of the song.
- In 1961, John Lee Hooker recorded a popular version of the song with a drum, bass and guitar band.
- In 1966, The Staple Singers did a recording on their album Why.
- In 1967, Bob Dylan and The Band recorded a version, released in 2014 on The Bootleg Series Vol. 11: The Basement Tapes Complete.
- In 1971, Pentangle recorded a version included on their album Reflection.
- In 1971, Agnes Chan recorded a version included on her debut album Will the Circle Game be Unbroken.
- In 1971, Leon Russell opened his Homewood sessions recording with the song as the musicians were entering the set.
- The Canadian gospel rock group Ocean released a version of the song as the B-side to their 1971 single, "We Got a Dream" and their 1972 single, "One More Chance".
- In 1972, The Youngbloods released a version of the song as the B-side to their single, "Light Shine".
- In 1972, Shocking Blue recorded a version, released on their album Attila.
- In 1973, Gregg Allman included a version of the song on his first solo album Laid Back.
- In 1979, George Jones recorded the song as a duet with The Staples Singers for his LP My Very Special Guests.
- In 1989, The Neville Brothers included a version of the song on their Grammy-winning album Yellow Moon.
- In 1989, Spacemen 3 included a demo version of the song on their album Playing With Fire.
- In 1992, The Wonder Stuff included a version of the song on their EP Welcome to the Cheap Seats.
- In 2002, The Avett Brothers included a version of the song on their album Live at the Double Door Inn.
- In 2009, Richie Havens performed the song in the film Soundtrack for a Revolution.
- In 2014, Scottish singer Susan Boyle recorded a version as one of her tracks for her sixth studio album, Hope.
- In 2014, Scottish singer and ex-Mànran front man Norrie MacIver (also of Skipinnish) included the song, as well as a cover in Scottish Gaelic titled "Am bi an Cearcall seo gun Bhristeadh", on his debut solo album, Danns an Rathaid.
- In 2014, Tonstartssbandht played it as part of their medley during several of their tours including in Europe as documented on their Overseas album.
- In 2022, The Dead South released a version of the song for their album Easy Listening for Jerks Vol.1.

== In popular culture ==
The Pointer Sisters and Nell Carter sing this song in an episode of Gimme a Break! titled "The Return of the Doo-Wop Girls" that originally aired on February 13, 1983.

Henry G. Sanders sang it in an episode of Dr. Quinn, Medicine Woman entitled "The Circle".

The song in its reworked version, "Can the Circle Be Unbroken," appeared in the 2004 film Iron Jawed Angels, although the film's website shows the original song as the title.. This is an anachronism as the lyrics they sing don't come out until 1935 and the movie is set between 1912-1920

In the 2008 series Sordid Lives: The Series (based on the play and movie of the same name) by Del Shores, characters Bitsy-Mae Harling, Wardel Owens, Peggy Igram, GW Nethercott, and Juanita Bartlett sing it briefly in Season 1 Episode 4.

June Carter's rendition of the song plays over the Deadwood season 1 episode 8 closing credits.

In the film 2012, the song can be heard on the family's way to Yellowstone Park.

In 2012, Belgian film The Broken Circle Breakdown (also known as Alabama Monroe) used the song on its soundtrack.

In 2016, Canadian circus "Cirque Éloize" used the song on its show "Saloon".

The song is covered in Treme season 2 episode 10, "That's What Lovers Do", at Harley's memorial service.

A season 3 episode of Pretty Little Liars was titled after the hymn and featured the song within the episode.

The hymn is sung every year at the Country Music Hall of Fame, at the conclusion of each medallion induction ceremony. It is performed by the inductees of that respective year as well as any previously inducted members of the Hall of Fame who are present. It is also prominently featured in the building's architecture: stone bars on the Rotunda's outside wall symbolize the notes of the classic song while the title of the song rings the interior of the structure.

Two versions of the hymn are featured in the soundtrack for the 2013 video game BioShock Infinite: a traditional choir version, performed by Maureen Murphy, and an award-winning acoustic version performed by Troy Baker (guitar) and Courtnee Draper, the voice actors of main characters Booker DeWitt and Elizabeth, respectively. The use of the original lyrics was controversial: some commentators, apparently unaware of the differences between the original and Carter versions, criticized the omission of "Lord" from the chorus as anti-religious censorship. The choice was explained as simply being consistent with the 1912 setting of the game, at which point the word "Lord" had not been added. The song won "the Best Song in a Game" award during the VGX 2013. In March 2013, the score for BioShock Infinite contained "Will the Circle Be Unbroken (Choral Version)" (2:56) on Track 3.

Senate candidate Beto O'Rourke joined Willie Nelson onstage to play and sing "Will the Circle be Unbroken?" among other numbers at Nelson's annual 4 July picnic, in 2018.

In 2025, the final scene of American film Castration Movie Anthology ii. The Best of Both Worlds featured the song performed by protagonist Circle (Alexandria Walton) on acoustic guitar.

== Bibliography ==
- Alexander, Charles M. Alexander's Gospel Songs No. 2. New York: Fleming H. Revell Company (1910).
