= Lutèce =

Lutèce is the French form of Lutetia, the Roman city where Paris now stands. The name also refers to:

- Lutèce (restaurant), a restaurant in New York City
- The Lutece Twins, a pair of characters in the 2013 video game BioShock Infinite
- Ulmus 'Nanguen', a hybrid elm cultivar resistant to Dutch elm disease, released to commerce circa 2001 by INRA, France.
