= Shallow Grave =

Shallow Grave may refer to:

- Shallow Grave (1987 film), an American slasher film
- Shallow Grave (1994 film), a British thriller film directed by Danny Boyle
- Shallow Grave (album), a 2008 album by The Tallest Man on Earth
