= Booker DeWitt =

Fictional character in the BioShock series

- BioShock character
- Illustration of Booker DeWitt in the official strategy guide for BioShock Infinite.
- First appearance: BioShock Infinite (2013)
- Last appearance: BioShock Infinite: Burial at Sea (2014)
- Created by: Irrational Games
- Voiced by: Troy Baker

In-universe information
- Gender: Male
- Occupation: Private investigator
- Affiliation: 7th Cavalry Regiment (formerly); Pinkerton National Detective Agency (formerly)
- Spouse: Annabelle Watson
- Children: Anna DeWitt / Elizabeth
- Nationality: American

Booker DeWitt is the player character of the 2013 video game BioShock Infinite, developed by Irrational Games and published by 2K Games. He also appears in its downloadable expansion, Burial at Sea. Booker is voiced by Troy Baker, who worked with creative director Ken Levine and Courtnee Draper, the voice of Elizabeth, to develop the characters' dialogue and relationship.

Introduced as a private investigator and former Pinkerton agent, Booker travels to the floating city of Columbia to retrieve Elizabeth in exchange for having his debts cleared. His attempts to escape with her bring him into conflict with the city's leader, Zachary Hale Comstock. The story gradually reveals Booker's involvement in the Wounded Knee Massacre, his relationship with Elizabeth, and his connection to Comstock, who is an alternate version of himself.

Levine chose a speaking protagonist to give Booker an active part in the story and a personal relationship with Elizabeth. Booker's dialogue and voice performance received praise. Criticism addressed the disparity between Booker's sympathetic portrayal and his violence, and the credibility of the revelation that he and Comstock are the same person. Baker was nominated for Best Voice Actor at the 2013 VGX Awards for the role.

== Development ==
Levine recalled that Booker and Elizabeth emerged around a year into development, after the team had settled on the idea of a city in the sky. Booker's name was inspired by the physicist Bryce DeWitt. Levine chose a speaking protagonist after the first BioShock had used its silent player character to question the player's willingness to follow orders. He wanted to give Booker a personal story and establish him as an active participant in Columbia, rather than repeat the earlier game's approach. He also wanted characters to meet directly, moving away from encounters conducted over a radio or through a glass barrier.

Booker was developed as a multiracial character of partial Native American descent: his mother is Sioux and his father is of Dutch descent. Irrational Games' artists explored different costumes, faces and ages for Booker during development. They sought an appearance that matched his gruff voice and bad temper, revising him from a thuggish figure into a weather-beaten everyman. Concept sketches included a younger, roguish Booker, a conventional square-jawed comic-book hero and a much older version. Some sketches showed more visible signs of his hard lifestyle. After settling on his general appearance, the team continued to vary his age, facial expressions and demeanor.

Booker's face was first revealed in July 2011, in cover artwork for EGMi, the digital companion to Electronic Gaming Monthly. The illustration was created by the studio's art team. For a television commercial produced by Blur Studio in autumn 2012, character lead James Ku modeled Booker, with hair created by James Marcus. The original cover of BioShock Infinite showed Booker carrying a gun in front of a burning American flag. Levine described the cover as a calculated marketing decision intended to reach a wider audience and help finance games of this kind. In the same interview, he announced plans to offer alternative covers online. Irrational later held a public vote to select a reversible game cover and subsequently made all eight alternatives available to download and print.

Booker and Elizabeth would spend much of Infinite together, responding to each other and to events around them. Levine worked in the recording studio with Baker and Draper, discussing scenes, trying different performances and rewriting dialogue in response to their contributions. Levine described Booker as a tragic hero, comparing him with Hamlet and Oedipus: figures whose potential makes the consequences of their actions more painful.

=== Voice performance ===
At the audition for the role of Booker, Levine would watch remotely as prospective actors were paired to test the chemistry between Booker and Elizabeth. Early character models and storyboards gave Baker some visual reference, but he had to imagine much of the environment in which the conversations took place.

Baker was initially uneasy about voicing a first-person protagonist; Levine encouraged him to set aside his usual acting choices and trust the writing. The first-person perspective restricted how Baker could express Booker's intentions. Most of the performance had to come through his voice and hands, while Elizabeth's facial expressions also conveyed the effect of his actions. During recording, Baker and Levine worked to reduce the dialogue and remove overtly performed emotion from individual lines. Baker also sought a consistent understanding of Booker's motivations that he could return to between recording sessions. Some scenes required extended sessions in which the actors and Levine tried improvised lines and discarded unsuccessful readings.

== Appearances ==
=== BioShock Infinite ===
In BioShock Infinite, Booker is a United States Army veteran who participated in the Wounded Knee Massacre and subsequently worked for the Pinkerton National Detective Agency. Haunted by his violent past, he struggles with drinking and gambling. In 1912, he is sent to Columbia to retrieve Elizabeth, a young woman imprisoned by Comstock, in exchange for the cancellation of his debts. He reaches her tower and persuades her to leave with him. Although he promises to take her to Paris, he initially intends to deliver her to his employers.

Comstock's forces pursue the pair, identifying Booker as the prophesied "False Shepherd" who will lead Elizabeth astray. Their search for a way out of Columbia brings them into contact with Cornelius Slate, a former comrade who celebrates Booker's actions at Wounded Knee, and Daisy Fitzroy, the leader of the revolutionary Vox Populi. Elizabeth's ability to open "tears" into other realities takes them to a version of Columbia in which Booker has died fighting for the Vox. As they travel, Elizabeth learns more about his past and witnesses his willingness to use violence. Booker eventually abandons his original plan and tries to protect her from Comstock.

After Booker kills Comstock and helps Elizabeth gain control of her powers, she reveals that she is his daughter, Anna. In 1893, Booker agreed to surrender Anna to the physicist Robert Lutece, who acted at Comstock's behest, in exchange for payment of his gambling debts. He changed his mind and tried to retrieve her as Lutece and Comstock took her through a tear. The closing portal severed part of Anna's finger, leaving her divided between two realities. Comstock raised her as Elizabeth, while Booker repressed his memory of giving her away. When the Lutece twins later brought him to Columbia, his confused recollections became the mission to find Elizabeth and clear his debts.

Elizabeth also reveals that Comstock is a version of Booker who accepted baptism after Wounded Knee and assumed a new identity. The Booker controlled by the player rejected the baptism, believing that it could not absolve him of his actions. To prevent Comstock's creation, multiple versions of Elizabeth return Booker to the baptism and drown him before he can make that choice. He accepts his death. A post-credits scene shows Booker waking in his apartment and calling for Anna.

=== Burial at Sea ===
The first episode of Burial at Sea follows another Comstock who has moved to the underwater city of Rapture and resumed Booker's identity. In his reality, his attempt to take Anna through a tear caused her death. He fled to Rapture and forgot his former life. Working as a private investigator, he is approached by Elizabeth, who asks him to find a missing girl, Sally. Their search ends with Elizabeth confronting him about Anna's death, shortly before a Big Daddy kills him.

Elizabeth is the player character of the second episode of Burial at Sea. An imagined version of Booker guides her through Rapture. Elizabeth's conversations with the imagined Booker serves as a means of explaining events to the player, despite Booker's absence as a living character.

== Reception and analysis ==
=== Critical response ===
Booker's dialogue, flashbacks and glimpses of his face gave him a more definite personality than the first game's protagonist, according to Matthew Reynolds of Digital Spy in an early preview. David Jenkins of Metro praised the writing and voice performances of Booker and Elizabeth. Their conversations were among his favorite parts of the game, and he found the changes in both characters' outlook believable. Jason Sheehan, writing for NPR in 2017, described Booker as a damaged noir antihero who becomes overshadowed by Elizabeth as she gains power over time and reality.

Other critics were less enthusiastic about Booker's characterization as well as his interactions with Elizabeth. Rick Lane's 2016 Eurogamer retrospective found Booker hostile and lacking in charm. Lane attributed the underdeveloped relationships to the emphasis on advancing the plot and moving between political and philosophical subjects. Chris Plante of Polygon objected to the violence displacing conversations through which Booker, Elizabeth and their family could have confronted their relationships. Elizabeth's quick returns to cheerful conversation after objecting to Booker's killings also seemed incongruous to him. For Erik Kain of Forbes, individual acts of brutality could be effective, but the constant combat numbed their impact and made Booker and Elizabeth's dialogue increasingly implausible. Patricia Hernandez felt less human playing Booker than observing Elizabeth, whose ordinary activities exceeded the player’s options and is more expressive than the player character himself.

The revelation that Booker and Comstock were versions of the same man was unconvincing to Nick Dinicola of PopMatters. The story had cast them as moral opposites without establishing enough parallels between them. Elizabeth's ready acceptance of Booker's remorse and violence made him seem a sympathetic rogue, weakening the suggestion that he could also be Comstock. Dinicola found the ending's demands on the player's understanding so distracting that Booker's sacrifice lost its emotional force.

Baker was nominated for Best Voice Actor at the 2013 VGX Awards for his performance as Booker. A 2015 Polygon profile by Megan Farokhmanesh identified Booker, Joel from The Last of Us and The Joker from the Batman: Arkham series as roles that helped establish Baker's prominence in video game acting.

=== Fatherhood and redemption ===
Ashley Dusenbery, a pastor writing for GameSpot, praised the use of baptism to structure Booker's search for redemption. Booker's initial financial debt introduced, in his reading, a moral debt that completing the mission could not repay.

Sarah Stang interprets Booker’s relationship with Elizabeth as a story of paternal redemption: a failed father who initially abducts her for his own benefit, he becomes willing to die for her. Stang sees their transformations as unequal: Elizabeth's influence makes him more selfless, while his influence leaves her increasingly accepting of violence, emotionally distant and vengeful. She compares this reversal with the relationship between Joel and Ellie in The Last of Us, and notes that the player cannot determine either relationship or its outcome. Colin Campbell of Polygon placed Booker among a succession of protective video game fathers, contrasting Elizabeth's bond with him with the absence of her mother.

Gerald Farca connects Booker’s attempt to rescue Elizabeth with his guilt over surrendering Anna and participating in Wounded Knee. Farca also suggests a connection between the player's participation in combat with Booker's history as a mercenary: a player intent on completing objectives efficiently can repeat Booker's habit of putting the mission first. Farca identifies remorse as a distinction between Booker and Comstock, and his eventual willingness to die for Elizabeth is a step toward the forgiveness he seeks.

The opening of the Agnus Dei from Mozart's Requiem accompanies Booker and Elizabeth's visit to the memorial to Lady Comstock. Musicologist William Gibbons said the movement's title, meaning "Lamb of God", alludes to Elizabeth's designation as the Lamb of Columbia and Booker's as the False Shepherd. The excerpt ends before the choir sings those words, with Elizabeth's startled realization about her parentage taking its place. Gibbons reads the musical reference as linking both characters to the history presented by the memorial.

=== Identity and player agency ===
Booker's confused memories keep the player from knowing that the mission to retrieve Elizabeth repeats the terms under which he surrendered Anna. Stefan Schubert describes this restricted perspective as a source of the game's narrative instability: the ending forces the player to reinterpret the history that Booker has concealed from himself. The revelation of his shared identity with Comstock also unsettles the apparent opposition between the game's hero and villain. Players who lose sight of Elizabeth may experience guilt themselves, according to Hugo Aranzaes, rather than merely recognize Booker's feelings. He presents this as an example of perspective-taking in the relationship between a player and an avatar.

In Steven Padnick's article about BioShock: Infinite published by Tor.com, different players' saved games produce different Bookers, but each must follow the same story. He compares this repetition with Tom Stoppard's play Rosencrantz and Guildenstern Are Dead, whose characters return to the same fate with each performance. The player must surrender Anna to continue, and restarting the game makes Booker repeat his mistakes. Padnick regards choosing not to play as the player's remaining means of refusing that narrative.

At the fairground, the player chooses how Booker responds to the persecution of an interracial couple. Christopher Bartel treats this as a choice about Booker's motives as well as his actions: he might oppose racism, share the crowd's racism, or cooperate to protect his cover. The limited effect on the plot allows the player to supply that interpretation without weighing major gameplay consequences. Bartel adds that Booker's established history constrains which motives the player can reasonably imagine.

Jordan Erica Webber argues that Booker accepts responsibility for Comstock’s actions because he mistakenly believes he could have become Comstock. Webber challenged that reasoning and discussed David Lewis's counterpart theory, which treats people in different possible worlds as similar counterparts rather than one person. She also consider whether Booker and Comstock could share parts of an identity across worlds. Under either account, she concluded, the particular Booker controlled by the player could not have taken a different path.

=== Cover art ===
Steven Romano of The Mary Sue criticized the original cover art, which depicted Booker prominently, for revealing little about the game's floating city setting. Grey Carter of The Escapist welcomed the alternative covers that were subsequently offered for download, criticizing the original cover's prominent armed Booker and its relegation of Elizabeth to the back.

=== Race ===
Stefan Schubert examines Booker's racial identity through Comstock's optional recording "The True Color of My Skin" as it concerns the history the two characters share before their lives diverge at the baptism. In the recording, Comstock denies allegations of Native American ancestry and recalls his violence against Native Americans at Wounded Knee. Schubert interprets this violence as an attempt to establish his whiteness. Webber and Griliopoulos accept the ancestry accusations as true in their account of Booker and Comstock's shared past, describing the killings as a response to them.
