= Elizabeth (BioShock) =

Character in BioShock Infinite

- BioShock character
- Elizabeth as she first appears in BioShock Infinite. Her appearance and attire changes several times over the course of the game.
- First appearance: BioShock Infinite (2013)
- Voiced by: Courtnee Draper
- Motion capture: Heather Gordon
- Portrayed by: Anna Moleva (promotion and face scan)

Elizabeth (Note: The character is occasionally referred as Elizabeth Comstock within the story and by some media outlets due to her status as an adoptee of Father Comstock.) is a fictional character in Irrational Games' BioShock Infinite. The game is set in 1912 on a floating steampunk city named Columbia which was founded on the principles of American exceptionalism. Elizabeth has been groomed in a controlled environment to take over the reins of the city once its current leader, Father Zachary Hale Comstock, dies. Elizabeth has the power to open "tears" in the fabric of reality; she is able to view remotely every event across all of the infinite timelines simultaneously and effortlessly open doorways to them, allowing her to access parallel universes. Her powers are a result of her unique nature, being simultaneously present in multiple realities, which was a consequence of Comstock's experiments.

To prevent her from leaving Columbia, her captors employ a "siphon" which drains and limits her powers, and she is locked in a tower guarded by a giant mechanical bird called the Songbird. In exchange for his gambling debts being forgiven, the main protagonist of Infinite, Booker DeWitt, enters Columbia in order to retrieve Elizabeth, unaware that she is his long lost daughter Anna DeWitt. Elizabeth also appears in Burial at Sea, a film noir-inspired episodic downloadable content story set in the underwater city of Rapture, where she takes on a femme fatale role and serves as the player character in the second episode.

The character is voiced by Courtnee Draper and her motion capture was provided by Heather Gordon. Irrational Games based Elizabeth's face on Anna Moleva, a Russian cosplayer, after the developers saw her accurate costume, and hired her to do live-action advertisements. Elizabeth's relationship with Songbird was partly based on Ken Levine's personal experiences. She is slightly naive after having lived most of her life in a tower. Developers repeatedly considered simply cutting her due to the hassle in making her "work". Great work was put into her artificial intelligence, with the developers believing there had been no real great A.I. companion in video games since Half-Life 2's Alyx Vance. The character has hyper-realistic expressions to help players see her from across the battlefield, as well as a two-tone colour scheme and unique silhouette. Elizabeth was heavily featured in news and media prior to the release of the game, and plastic figures of her have been made. She has been positively received, and Infinite reviews particularly highlighted her role. Her A.I. was praised, as was her character and narrative role.

== Character ==
Elizabeth is introduced in Infinite as a young woman that has been held captive aboard Columbia since a baby. She is claimed to be the daughter of Father Comstock, the founder of Columbia, and heralded as the proverbial Lamb that will inherit the city. She has been kept under observation in a well-furnished cell within a large statue of the female personification of Columbia, using her time in captivity to become well-read and to learn practical skills like lock-picking and cryptography. She is aware of the existence of tears in the fabric of space-time within Columbia and has limited ability to manipulate them.

Her captivity is maintained by Songbird, a mechanical robot-like bird creature. Elizabeth experiences a conflict in her feelings about Songbird, since he has been feeding, playing, etc. with her, while at the same time keeping her captive. This conflict was partly based on Ken Levine's personal experiences. Levine once knew and dated a girl that had been abused by a former partner; and she made excuses for him, and eventually went back to him. He highlighted the difference between the two, "Elizabeth is trying to get free", but still drew a connection between them.

Elizabeth is "the most critical of the game's visual icons", being constantly a companion to the protagonist.

No longer being recently out of the tower, Elizabeth's character is slightly different in Burial at Sea, being "older, wiser and more confident". The DLC, taking place in Rapture from the first BioShock games, is evocative of film noir with Booker becoming the private detective and Elizabeth the client and femme fatale. Elizabeth's arc in the DLC continues on from her one in Infinite. She is still aware of the events in the main game, and has an understanding of the various universes she can visit and the so mentioned "constants and variables" she is aware of.

== Development ==
The idea for a character like Elizabeth came about due to both System Shock 2 and BioShock being "solitary experiences", due to other characters either being behind glass or dead. Having Elizabeth to bounce off the player helped reduce the sense of "[re]treading water". An A.I. character was decided on as the developers felt it had not been done well since Half-Life 2's Alyx Vance. Ken Levine's, creative director and lead writer on BioShock Infinite, described Elizabeth as the "emotional center" of Infinite. BioShock's Big Daddies and Little Sisters provided the groundwork for the A.I.

Earlier versions of Elizabeth were mute, in part due to anxiety in making her "work", being more of a "Gibson Girl". The player character, Booker DeWitt, would also be mute, and so conversations between them would be non-existent. One of the reasons this was changed was to allow more freedom to the player (rather than having her grab Booker to point at things) and to allow her to have a presence even when off-screen, in addition to giving her more personality. Another change made was to Infinite's beach scene, due to negative reactions to the character. Originally, she just left Booker after the crash, but this made her seem like a "flighty nutjob" and parts with Elizabeth trying to resuscitate Booker before getting permission to leave were added.

Elizabeth was more scripted originally. The team tried to ensure she would almost always be on screen, while at the same time ensuring she didn't get in the way of the player. The developers made a "Liz Squad" group, in charge of the character and dedicated to populating the world with objects for Elizabeth to interact with, which was claimed to be led by either Amanda Jeffrey or John Abercrombie (who also did the AIs of the first BioShock). In order to properly react to things, Elizabeth had to have emotions. Some of her scripted animations had to be cut, as they were coming off too similar to Rapunzel from Walt Disney Pictures' Tangled.

Designing Elizabeth proved very difficult, and repeatedly the team wanted to simply cut her. Troubles included expressing her childlike curiosity, making her act with a believable sense of horror to Booker's more violent actions, while keeping her out of the player's way. Similar issues were had with the Big Daddies, with the team being unsure what to do with them. Despite this, her role in Infinite "deepened" as development progressed, due to the team liking the character. This led to her becoming more of a partner, and she gained additional abilities such as being able to lockpick doors within gameplay (originally a one-time event).

In the second episode of "Burial at Sea", Elizabeth becomes the player character. Being more of a thoughtful character than Booker, her gameplay focuses more on strategy and avoidance of direct combat, more like a survival horror game. It was important that Elizabeth did not feel simply like Booker "in a dress". Jeffrey noted that Elizabeth was the main character of Infinite and Rapture the main character of the first game, and so "Burial" involved "our two leading ladies playing opposite each other". Lead animator Shawn Robertson felt that Elizabeth's presence helped tie Rapture with Infinite. In a 2016 interview, Levine contrasted Elizabeth to most of the other characters he created for the BioShock series; many of these characters had been oppressed and subsequently once freed of that oppression, became oppressors themselves, but Elizabeth was written to break this cycle of oppression.

=== Design ===
Early faceless concept art played with posture and her costume.

Numerous concept art was made for the character. Early sketches tried different ways to portray her personality through posture and clothes, using the "clean, bright, and iconic" costumes of comic books as inspiration. Different art explored Elizabeth at all different ages, and varied her in demeanor, disposition, and look. Artists also experimented with the design for a "more aloof, princesslike" version of the character.

Elizabeth has a "stylised and 'hyper-realistic'" appearance, meant to allow the player to see her body motions and expression easily from a distance. Elizabeth's original Gibson Girl appearance had a normal-looking face, having normal facial feature proportions and using motion capture for her expressions. This was changed to hand-keyed animations and a more exaggerated look when playtesters ceased to notice her over other parts of Infinite. In order to form an emotional connection with the character, players had to "see what she [was] thinking at all times". Hand-keyed animations also allowed them to change expressions to fit with changes or current ideas, rather than being stuck with motion captures shot months ago. For the exaggeration, inspiration again was taken from comic books as well as animated films, and Irrational's artists studied classic animators' works to see how they portrayed emotion.

Other elements that needed to change in order to stand out were her silhouette, and her colour scheme took on an almost two-tone look. Levine was disappointed in the online community's mainly focusing on her breast size and chest, believing people should be more interested in her as a person rather than her appearance, and considered the expressive eyes the most important part of her design. Artists such as Claire Hummel helped work on her dress, intended to look "age-appropriate" and fitting for 1912. Her choker had many variations tried before they finalised it as a "more simple, elegant" one.

Elizabeth's design was modified for Burial at Sea. Prerelease materials showcased her new more mature design, with one shot having multiple angles to help any cosplayers who wished to dress up as the character. Elizabeth's femme fatale appearance was inspired by approximately seven different people of the era, including actresses Rita Hayworth, Lauren Bacall, and Veronica Lake.

=== Portrayal ===
Russian cosplayer Anna Moleva (right) had recreated the character of Elizabeth (left) so accurately that Irrational hired her to be their live-action Elizabeth.

Courtnee Draper voices the character. Levine commented that Draper was able to both capture Elizabeth's enthusiasm and dark background. Levine, Draper, and Booker's voice actor Troy Baker worked collaboratively, and would talk about scenes and improvise new lines. Though Baker was more experienced in game acting, Draper had appeared in very few, offering a perspective Levine considered an advantage. Draper has said she would be interested in playing Elizabeth again if a BioShock film were ever made, and had talked to Levine about it.

Motion capture was done by Heather Gordon, who often had to rely on her imagination when performing, being in an almost empty room. Elizabeth had to do numerous physical acts that Gordon would not do in her everyday life.

Russian cosplayer Anna Moleva was brought on to be the "official face" of Elizabeth for the box cover, key art and an advertisement, after developers saw her dress up as the character, citing her dedication and resemblance to the character. Moleva had been a fan of the BioShock franchise, but before seeing Elizabeth's final design hadn't found many cosplaying possibilities for it. Levine contacted her on Facebook with an offer, before telling her to get in touch through e-mail. Moleva was told to sit still and pull various faces, which were then scanned into a computer.

== Appearances ==
=== BioShock Infinite ===
At the start of Infinite, set in 1912, Booker DeWitt is sent to Columbia by the Lutece twins to recover Elizabeth, claiming that they will wipe away his debts with her return. Booker is quickly discovered as the "False Shepherd" that will take the Lamb away, and is set on by Comstock's troops. Booker frees Elizabeth, and both narrowly avoid an attack by Songbird that destroys part of the statue. As Elizabeth accompanies Booker, she discovers that her abilities to find and manipulate tears have grown stronger, and uses them to help Booker fight through Comstock's troops.

Elizabeth is initially doubtful of Booker's intentions, but comes to trust him over the other residents of Columbia. When trying to track down a man who reportedly holds a key to helping them escape, they find the man already dead; Elizabeth uses her powers to pull them into an alternate reality where the man is still alive, but this has unintended side effects in that others around them suffer from nosebleeds and mental anguish, and Elizabeth becomes fearful of her abilities. They eventually board an airship to escape, but it is brought aground in Columbia by Songbird, who kidnaps Elizabeth. Booker gives chase, but is pulled into the future of 1983 by an elderly Elizabeth. She shows him that without his rescue, she will become like Comstock, inheriting the city and using it to lay waste to the surface world below. Before allowing Booker to return to his time, the future Elizabeth gives him a message to give to "his" Elizabeth to help her control Songbird and allow them to escape.

Booker frees Elizabeth from an observation laboratory and the two make their way to confront Comstock. Along the way, they learn that Elizabeth has been kept under control of the Siphon, a machine built by the Luteces into the statue to nullify her tear powers; they also learn that Elizabeth is not Comstock's biological daughter, though oddly shares his genetics, and Comstock killed his wife and attempted to kill the Luteces to hide this conspiracy. They reach Comstock and Booker confronts him about Elizabeth's identity. Comstock says Booker already knows it and the reason for why Elizabeth wears a thimble in place of her little finger. Booker kills Comstock in anger, but Elizabeth calms him down and says they need to finish destroying the statue and the Siphon to fully realize her powers. They do so by controlling Songbird, but when Songbird turns on them, Elizabeth transports them to the underwater city of Rapture, where Songbird is destroyed by the outside water pressure.

Elizabeth guides Booker to the bathysphere lighthouse, revealing she can now see all possibilities based on choice as evidenced by an infinite number of lighthouses they can see. Elizabeth explains the nature of choice to Booker, revealing that Booker and Comstock are the same person: in one reality, Booker ran away from a baptism ceremony after his atrocities at the Battle of Wounded Knee, while in another, he accepted it and became the religious Comstock. Elizabeth reveals she is also Booker's daughter, Anna DeWitt, whom Booker had sold to the Lutece twins to pay off gambling debts. They in turn were working for Comstock, who needed a blood heir for Columbia, having been rendered sterile by the twins' reality-warping experiments. Booker later had a change of heart and chased down the Luteces as they stepped through a Tear, severing the tip of Anna's finger, which gave her awareness of multiple realities. Elizabeth asserts that there has been an endless cycle of Bookers and Comstocks, and the only way to end this is to prevent the creation of Comstock; she takes Booker to the site of the baptism and drowns him with the aid of other Elizabeths from alternate timelines. The Elizabeths begin to wink out of existence, with the game fading to black on the one throughout the game.

=== Burial at Sea ===
In Burial at Sea, Elizabeth approaches Booker – in this reality, a private detective in Rapture – to help them find a missing girl named Sally. They trace her whereabouts to a derelict department store, during which Booker suffers flashbacks to his baptism, but unable to explain them. When they finally find Sally, they find she has been changed into a Little Sister, and Booker suffers more flashbacks, recalling his daughter Anna, before becoming aware of his true nature: he had been one of the Bookers that became a Comstock, but in his attempt to get Anna from another Booker, she was killed. In his remorse, this Comstock reverted to his birth name of Booker DeWitt and had the Lutece twins transport him to Rapture, a reality where neither Anna nor Columbia existed. Elizabeth makes sure that Comstock is killed by a Big Daddy before she passes out.

When she comes to, she finds Atlas has Sally and demands she help them escape the store to return to Rapture in exchange for her. As she sets out to do this, she is guided by visions of Booker, and later learns that she herself had died earlier in Rapture; she made a deal with the Lutece twins to combine all her quantum selves and memories of future time into one mortal body to return to this place at this time to rescue Sally, effectively leaving all alternate versions of herself in their own respective universes. She struggles with this, and further learns that Dr. Suchong of Rapture had worked with Jeremiah Fink from Columbia to collaborate on technology. Suchong forces her to briefly return to Columbia via a tear to obtain a Lutece particle that will raise the sunken Rapture building, where she further learns that the Luteces had convinced Daisy Fitzroy to threaten Fink's child to make Elizabeth kill her as to mature her. She returns and amid an attack by Andrew Ryan's men, completes the task. Atlas launches his war against Ryan and tortures Elizabeth in an attempt to extract the location of his "Ace in the Hole". In a flash of panic, she is able to remember the location, and Atlas makes her go retrieve it. The Ace is revealed to be a piece of paper with a coded message. She willing gives it over to Atlas knowing that he plans to kill her, but is privy to one last memory from before - that of seeing Jack on the plane that would crash near Rapture, and the note containing Jack's trigger phrase "Would you kindly". Atlas uses this to start his last attack on Andrew Ryan and fatally strikes Elizabeth's head with a wrench multiple times. Elizabeth dies holding Sally's hand, smiling in knowing Jack will soon come to help the children of Rapture escape the violence.

== Promotion and reception ==
Prior to the release of the game, Elizabeth was widely publicised and reported in media, and Elizabeth (along with one of the "Boys of Silence" enemies) plastic figures were created, produced by NECA. The second of Infinite's "Truth from Legend" trailers – both designed to look like old documentaries – details both Songbird and "the Lamb of Columbia", showcasing more of the character and her past. A lithograph of one promotional artwork, featuring Elizabeth and Songbird, was also released, alongside other lithographs.

Before the game was released, Nicole Tanner of IGN, although initially offput by her large cleavage, praised her realistic personality and the idea of bringing more realistic female characters into games. She also felt the relationship between her and Songbird was "one of the most complex [she'd] seen explored" in gaming. In a comparison between Dishonored and Infinite, Kotaku's Kirk Hamilton compared Elizabeth and Emily in "The Girl" category, preferring Elizabeth, saying she "moreorless WAS BioShock Infinite" and praising her believability. IGN's Beyond! podcast compared the character to The Last of Us's Ellie, noting their similar roles but markedly different personalities.

Courtnee Draper was nominated for "Best Voice Actress" for her role as Elizabeth in the Spike VGX 2013 awards, and was nominated for "Best Performer" in the 10th British Academy Video Games Awards, but lost to Ashley Johnson as Ellie in both cases. Draper and Baker together both won the "Best Song in a Game" award, for the moment in Infinite where Booker begins playing the guitar and Elizabeth sings "Will the Circle Be Unbroken?". Elizabeth was nominated for "Best New Character" in Hardcore Gamer's Game of the Year Awards 2013, though again lost to Ellie. In addition, she was nominated by Destructoid as "Best Character", losing to fellow Infinite characters the Lutece Twins.

Her implementation as an AI partner for the player-controlled Booker was described by GamesRadar's Lucas Sullivan to be "downright ingenious", and was stated by Fitch and McCaffrey to be the main aspect that separated Infinite from its predecessors. Also from Kotaku, Patricia Hernandez commented that Elizabeth felt more human than the player themselves, and her liveliness made other characters seem "dead by comparison". Special praise was given not only to Elizabeth's ability to take care of herself in combat, but also for actively assisting the player by finding ammo and health, and opening tears. Not all commentary was positive, however. Matt Bradford, again from GamesRadar, listed the lockpicking on a list of "biggest nitpicks" with Infinite, criticising the inconsistency between her always cheerful or cocky lockpicking lines and current mood. bit-tech's Edward Chester criticised Elizabeth's interrupting, pointing out how she never mentioned she was picking ammo up, would throw coins during voxaphone listenings and mid-fight, and how she would only start talking after big moments rather than regularly. Chester also criticised the inconsistency about whether the tears were a "strain" on Elizabeth or not.

Praise was given to the character's ability to invoke emotions. Sullivan stated that Elizabeth felt like "a friend," with McCaffrey adding that she "provides motivation and moves the story forward," and felt that her presence in the story added "emotional depth", something he believed the first BioShock lacked. Several reviewers praised Elizabeth's relationship and interactions with Booker, believing that they formed the core of Infinite' s story, with Mikel Reparaz of Official Xbox Magazine explaining "the evolving interplay between her and Booker is the heart and soul of what makes BioShock Infinite such an involving, memorable experience." Rock, Paper, Shotgun's Alec Meer listed the relationship between Elizabeth and Booker as one of ten "intrigues" he was unable to fit into his main review of the game, noting how despite needing to be rescued in the game a few times, "ultimately she is the one with power, both emotionally and science-fictionally." Game Informer's Kimberley Wallace listed Booker and Elizabeth as one of 2013's best gaming "duos", crediting Elizabeth's ability to make Booker question things. In 2016, Glixel staff ranked Elizabeth the 40th most iconic video game character of the 21st century, and the backstory behind her missing little finger her most "iconic moment".

== Legacy ==
Jonathan Nolan, co-creator of the Westworld television series, said that BioShock Infinite was a major influence on Westworld, in particular with Elizabeth as the basis for the lead character Dolores Abernathy.

Elizabeth has been the subject of a vast amount of fan-created pornography, although according to creator Ken Levine, any sex symbol status was never the intention, and he has expressed displeasure at these depictions of the character.
