= Killer Queen (Family Guy) =

- Family Guy episode
- Brian shows Stewie the cover for Queen's album News of the World, which terrifies him.
- Episode no.: Season 10; Episode 16
- Directed by: Joseph Lee
- Written by: Spencer Porter
- Production code: 9ACX12
- Original air date: March 11, 2012

Guest appearances
- H. Jon Benjamin as Carl Graves; Jackson Douglas; Christine Lakin as Joyce Kinney; Jeff Ross as himself; Eddie Kaye Thomas as Barry Robinson; Oliver Vaquer as Patrick Pewterschmidt; Robert Wu as Charles Yamamoto

Episode chronology
← Previous "Burning Down the Bayit"	Next → "Forget-Me-Not"
- Family Guy season 10

"Killer Queen" is the sixteenth episode of the tenth season of the animated comedy series Family Guy, and the 181st episode overall. It originally aired on Fox in the United States on March 11, 2012. When Peter and Chris go away to fat camp, they cross paths with a serial killer who targets overweight teens. Meanwhile, Stewie is traumatized by the cover of the 1977 Queen album News of the World, which Brian found to terrify Stewie. The title of the episode is based on the Queen song of the same name which plays during the end credits.

This episode was written by Spencer Porter and directed by Joseph Lee. It features guest performances by H. Jon Benjamin, Jackson Douglas, Christine Lakin, Jeff Ross, Eddie Kaye Thomas, Oliver Vaquer, and Robert Wu, along with several recurring voice actors for the series. The episode received fairly positive reviews from critics.

== Plot ==
Peter and Chris learn of a local hot dog eating contest on the local news, so Peter enters Chris in it. While Peter and Chris search for an old possession in the attic for $50 (the cost of entry), Brian finds Queen's 1977 album News of the World. Stewie is immediately frightened by the cover, depicting the giant robot that has killed the members of Queen. Brian pays Peter and Chris $50 for the album to be able to mess with Stewie's head. However, Stewie eventually attempts suicide. Brian stops him, and explains that the members of Queen are fine, before clarifying that "Most of them are fine" (referring to Freddie Mercury's death in 1991).

At the contest, Chris eats 41 hot dogs, beating worldwide hot dog eating champion Charles Yamamoto. Chris starts feeling stomach pains soon after, and Lois decides to enroll him (along with Peter after Chris calls him out for being fatter than him) in a fat camp called Camp Fresh Start. While hiking, Peter and Chris discover the dead body of an obese teenager. When Joe brings up that the young man was murdered, everyone turns to see Jason Voorhees, but he reveals he is just there to sign up his son, Justin. Joe notices that the victim was strangled, leading Peter to think that the killer was his brother-in-law Patrick Pewterschmidt. The family think it to be impossible as Patrick is still at the mental institution, but he soon appears at the Griffin house. However, after Peter and Joe rush to the house, Patrick reveals that he's not the killer and that someone opened his prison cell door days earlier stating he was free to go. This statement is later proven when another obese teenager is found murdered while Patrick was not there. Peter and Joe have an idea to catch the real killer by bringing Patrick along, who quickly deduces that the killer is really after Chris and the two other victims were killed by mistake due to coincidental similarities.

By that time, while sleeping back at home, Chris is attacked by the real killer: none other than Charles Yamamoto, who wants revenge on Chris for defeating and "dishonoring" him in the hot dog eating contest. Just as Yamamoto is about to kill Chris, Stewie appears and, having overcome his own fear, shows Yamamoto the News of the World album, causing Yamamoto to suffer a heart attack (a reference to the album Sheer Heart Attack featuring "Killer Queen", and song "Sheer Heart Attack" on the News of the World album), which kills him instantly. Police arrive at the house, where Patrick points out that the dead Yamamoto is the man who released him, revealing the killer's plan to use Patrick as a scapegoat. But when Patrick disappears just as he is about to apologize to him, Joe has Peter injure him to make it look like Patrick escaped his custody.

The aforementioned "Killer Queen" plays as the credits roll.

== Production and development ==
This episode was written by Spencer Porter and directed by Joseph Lee, during the course of the eleventh production season. The episode marks the return of Lois's mentally-ill brother, Patrick Pewterschmidt. However, Robert Downey Jr. did not reprise the role of Patrick Pewterschmidt, possibly due to his heavy filming schedule at the time. Instead, voice actor Oliver Vaquer took the role. This episode also featured a cameo appearance from Barry Robinson from American Dad!, another show created by Seth MacFarlane, as well two ex-Family Guy writers, Mike Barker and Matt Weitzman. As a result, this is the only Family Guy episode to have Eddie Kaye Thomas as a voice actor.

== Reception ==
The episode received a 2.8 rating and was watched by a total of 5.74 million people, this made it the most watched show on Animation Domination that night, beating The Cleveland Show, Bob's Burgers, American Dad!, and The Simpsons with 4.97 million. Kevin McFarland of The A.V. Club gave the episode a B, saying "The cutaways had some laughs, especially the two patter song sequences with Peter mumbling his way through musical numbers, but for the most part this was an average half-hour. That’s better than the norm for late-period Family Guy, which too often forgets things like plot and intertwining stories in favor of cutaways intended to offend. I liked the simplicity of tonight’s half-hour, laughed a few times, and never really groaned at any horrible material. Faint praise to be sure, but it makes the show bearable."
