= The Thirteenth Year =

American TV movie

- VHS cover
- Written by: Jenny Arata; Robert L. Baird; Kelly Senecal
- Directed by: Duwayne Dunham
- Starring: Chez Starbuck; Dave Coulier; Lisa Stahl Sullivan; Justin Jon Ross; Courtnee Draper; Tim Redwine; Brian Haley; Brent Briscoe
- Theme music composer: Phil Marshall
- Country of origin: United States
- Original language: English

Production
- Executive producer: Heidi Wall
- Producer: Thom Colwell
- Cinematography: Michael Slovis
- Editor: Brian Berdan
- Running time: 95 minutes
- Production companies: Mike Jacobs, Jr. Productions; Dream City Films

Original release
- Network: Disney Channel
- Release: May 15, 1999

The Thirteenth Year is a 1999 American fantasy comedy film directed by Duwayne Dunham and starring Chez Starbuck and Courtnee Draper. It premiered on Disney Channel on May 15, 1999.

== Plot ==
Cody Griffin is an adopted teenager living in the fictional nautical community of Mahone Bay; his birth mother is a mermaid who left him on Whit and Sharon Griffin's boat when he was a baby to avoid being captured. As she left, she lured a fisherman, Big John Wheatley, away and he became obsessed with finding mermaids since. Years later, Cody establishes himself as a quick swimmer on his school's swim team, and he has a girlfriend named Samantha. He is under a lot of pressure from a big swim meet coming up and because he is failing biology, he is partnered with Jess Wheatley, the class geek (and Big John's son) who is a marine biology expert.

On his 13th birthday, Cody has an unquenchable thirst and he later jolts Samantha with an electric shock when he kisses her. Since that day, he begins to feel strange. As he wakes up in the morning, he turns off his alarm clock and zaps it. Ignoring it, Cody drinks from a milk container, which becomes stuck to his hand. Jess notices scales forming on Cody's hand and says he has only seen that kind of thing on frogs and lizards. As the symptoms are getting worse, Cody goes to Jess for help, who agrees to figure out what is going on with him as long as Cody teaches him to swim in return. Jess runs various tests, learning Cody can generate electricity, hold his breath underwater for a long period of time, climb walls, talk to fish, swim extremely fast, and when wet, scales appear on his hands, arms and feet. Jess concludes that Cody is turning into a merman.

Once his adoptive parents find out, they make him avoid water at all costs and ban him from attending the swim meet. Cody decides to swim in the sea a day later and finds out he had grown jagged fins along his arms, which he manages to hide from Samantha by placing his arms in the sand. Despite the risks, he attends the swim meet and not only wins and beats his teammate and rival Sean, but breaks the state speed record. However, Cody's scales and arm fins have reappeared, and he decides to cause a power surge in order to flee, which breaks the scoreboard. Seeing the scales and surmising that Cody cheated, Sean follows the fleeing Cody into the locker room. Cody avoids him by sticking to the ceiling, and safely makes it out of the school and goes home with his parents after they find out he was not in his room. Back home, they all try to turn Cody back to normal by drying him but the scales are lasting longer now.

Cody tries calming his parents by claiming nobody saw his scales, but Jess shows up and tells them he saw everything and that people are talking about Cody winning the race and running off. Samantha arrives soon afterward but faints at the sight of Cody's scales. When she awakens, she is freaked out. Cody tells her he is turning into a merman but he is still the same guy and she should not be afraid. While sworn to secrecy for Cody's safety, Samantha is disturbed by the discovery and leaves. The following night Cody takes a swim, and meets his mermaid mother; however, Big John, the obsessed fisherman, spots them and breaks up the reunion, forcing the two to retreat in opposite directions.

The next day, Cody meets Samantha at the beach. She apologizes and they kiss. Cody then walks into the water with her and introduces her to his mermaid mother; however, Cody suddenly gasps in pain and stumbles back to the shore. Writhing on the ground, he tells Samantha to get his parents. After she leaves, Cody is in shock as he watches his left foot morph into a flipper and scales grow on his leg. Thinking Samantha came back, Cody is surprised when someone else is there and throws a blanket over him.

Jess comes down to where Cody was but sees he is gone. He then sees his father's boat and panics because his father had seen Cody's arms at the swim meet. On the deck of the boat, Cody is drying out and scratching his scales, begging to get into the water, but Big John throws sea water over him instead. His plan is to use Cody to lure in his mother to prove he is not crazy for believing in mermaids. His plan works when he spots Cody's mother following the boat. Jess comes on board the boat and removes the blanket, revealing Cody's legs, which have both transformed into fins. Cody asks him for help into the water. Despite trying to warn the mermaid away, Cody and Jess are unable to stop a fishing net from trapping her. Cody asks Jess to help his mother, so he takes a knife and jumps into the water to cut the net. He frees the mermaid, but his leg gets caught in the net, pulling him under. Jess passes out, but Cody jumps in and brings him to the dock where Jess's father, Cody's parents, and Samantha are. Samantha performs CPR, but is unsuccessful. Cody decides to zap Jess' heart, which successfully makes Jess regain consciousness.

Cody's mermaid mother shows up again and watches him and his family from afar. Cody explains she wants him to go with her because she is the only one who can help him with his changes. Sharon does not want him to leave, but he points out that he is her son, but he is more than that, showing his fins, that he has almost become a full merman. The mermaid mother promises to send Cody back before school starts and Cody's parents let him leave. Jess asks Cody to tell him and his dad about the aquatic life he sees, and Samantha makes Cody promise not to betray her by falling for mermaids. After saying their goodbyes, Cody and his birth mother reunite and Cody fully transforms into a merman. They swim off into a life below the surface.

== Cast ==
- Chez Starbuck as Cody Griffin, a boy who discovers on his thirteenth birthday that he is biologically a merman.
- Dave Coulier as Whit Griffin, Cody's adoptive father
- Lisa Stahl Sullivan as Sharon Griffin, Cody's adoptive mother
- Justin Jon Ross as Jess Wheatley, Big John's son and Cody's best friend
- Courtnee Draper as Samantha, Cody's girlfriend
- Tim Redwine as Sean Marshall, Cody's rival
- Brian Haley as Coach, the coach of Cody's school swim team
- Brent Briscoe as John "Big John" Wheatley, a mermaid-obsessed fisherman and Jess's father.
- Karen Maruyama as Mrs. Nelson
- Regan Burns as Joe
- Joel McKinnon Miller as Hal
- Stephanie Chantel Durelli as Mermaid, Cody's biological mother

== Production ==
The Thirteenth Year was the film debut of lead actor Chez Starbuck, who had previously only acted in a few commercials, and had served as an anchor of a local children's news program for KLAS-TV in his hometown of Las Vegas. The film was shot over a six-week period in southern California. Starbuck was advised by an acting coach for each day of filming. The ocean scenes were primarily shot in the Newport Beach communities of the Balboa Peninsula and Corona del Mar. Cody's house was filmed at Point Fermin Light in San Pedro, California.

== Release ==
The Thirteenth Year premiered on Disney Channel on May 15, 1999. It was Disney Channel's second highest-rated film up to that point. A promotional tour for the film took place across a dozen cities during summer 1999. The film was released on VHS on January 23, 2001. The film is currently available for viewing on Disney+.

== Reception ==
The Post-Standard stated that while the film was not as entertaining as the 1984 mermaid film Splash, it "has a good pace and a few laughs," although it was noted that Starbuck's "stiff" performance "dampens some of the movie's charm." In June 2011, Stephan Lee of Entertainment Weekly called the film a "heartwarming and somewhat creepy tale of growing up, leaving the nest, and of course, being yourself". In 2012, Complex ranked the film at number 17 on the magazine's list of the 25 best Disney Channel Original Movies. In May 2016, Aubrey Page of Collider ranked each DCOM released up to that point, placing The Thirteenth Year at number 16 and calling it an "indisputable DCOM classic". That month, Entertainment Weekly ranked it at number 7 on a list of the top 30 DCOMs.

== See also ==
- The Shadow over Innsmouth
- The Fly (1986 film)
- Turning Red
- Ruby Gillman, Teenage Kraken
