= Lisa Stahl =

American actress

- Other name: Lisa Stahl-Sullivan
- Occupations: Actress; model; MC
- Years active: 1985–present

Lisa Stahl, sometimes credited as Lisa Stahl-Sullivan is an American model, actress and game show host.

== Early life ==
Stahl graduated from North Miami High School in 1982 and was a former cheerleader for the Miami Dolphins.

== Career ==
Stahl was a model throughout the 1980s and 1990s.

In the world of television game shows, she was one of the featured models on the nighttime version of The New Price Is Right.

As an actress, she appeared in multiple movies such as Heart Condition, with Denzel Washington, Jerry Maguire with Tom Cruise, the Disney films The Thirteenth Year, and Safety Patrol, Calendar Girl with Jason Priestley, My Life, with Michael Keaton, and Nicole Kidman, and TV series Baywatch and was one of the 5 main cast of Baywatch Nights as regular character Destiny Desimone. Beyond her role on Baywatch and Baywatch Nights, Stahl was featured in TV shows such as Silk Stalkings NYPD Blue, Murphy Brown, Moonlighting, Married... with Children and Ellen. She was featured in the 1984 George Michael video "Careless Whisper", as the scorned girlfriend, who takes off on a plane and leaves Michael stranded at the harbor staring up at her, and pleading for her return.

Stahl was the co-presenter of the Florida Lottery show in the late 1990's

== Filmography ==
Film and television appearances
Year	Title	Role	Notes
1985	Invasion U.S.A.	Teengirl on Beach	
1987	Shallow Grave	Sue Ellen	
1988	Elvis and Me	English Girl	Television film
1989	Moonlighting	Model	Episode: "Those Lips, Those Lies"
1990	Heart Condition	Annie	
1990	The Bold and the Beautiful	Forrester Model	
1993	Thunder in Paradise	Nicole	Pilot film for the series
1993–1994	Baywatch	Destiny Desimone	2 episodes
1994	Thunder in Paradise	Nicole	3 episodes
1994	Ellen	Delila	Episode: "The Refrigerator"
1994	All-American Girl	Beauty Contestant	Episode: "Malpractice Makes Perfect"
1995	Tough and Deadly	Maureen Peek	
1995	Married... with Children	Gretchen	Episode: "Ship Happens"
1995	The Watcher	Robin	2 episodes
1995	Burke's Law	Daphne Darnell	Episode: "Who Killed the Centerfold?"
1995	Murphy Brown	Raquel	Episode: "Fearless Frank"
1995–1996	Renegade	Cheryl MacRae / Stacy Balfour	2 episodes
1996	Ocean Girl	Tribunal Member	Episode: "Danger in the Reef"
1996	NYPD Blue	Amelia Duncan	Episode: "Where'd the Van Gogh?"
1996	Jerry Maguire	Former Girlfriend	
1995–1997	Baywatch Nights	Destiny Desimone / Dana Hunter / Nadine	12 episodes
1996–1998	Silk Stalkings	Billi Brock / Jill Mobley / Dana	2 episodes
1996–2000	Pacific Blue	Dr. Helen Bradshaw / Erlene Keene / Annette	3 episodes
1997	Fast Track	Tanya Lynn	Episode: "Lap of Faith"
1998	The Wonderful World of Disney	Nurse Viola	Episode: "Safety Patrol!"
1998	Ivory Tower	Carol	
1999	Pensacola: Wings of Gold	Kristi Blake	Episode: "Night Traps"
1999	The Thirteenth Year	Sharon Griffin	Television film
1999	Oh, Grow Up	Carmen	Episode: "Himbo"
1999	Sliders	Monique Mansfield	Episode: "To Catch a Slider"
2000	V.I.P.	Kelly Vickers	Episode: "Miss Con-Jeannie-Ality"
2002	Torture TV	Missy Anderton	Television series
