= BioShock Infinite: Burial at Sea =

Episodic expansion to the first-person shooter video game "BioShock Infinite"

- Developer: Irrational Games
- Publisher: 2K
- Director: Ken Levine
- Designer: Andres Elias Gonzalez Tahhan
- Writers: Ken Levine; Drew Holmes
- Composer: Garry Schyman
- Series: BioShock
- Engine: Unreal Engine 3
- Platforms: PlayStation 3; OS X; Windows; Xbox 360; Linux
- Release: Episode One; November 12, 2013; Episode Two; March 25, 2014
- Genres: First-person shooter, stealth
- Mode: Single-player

BioShock Infinite: Burial at Sea is a two-part single-player expansion to the first-person shooter video game BioShock Infinite. It was developed by Irrational Games and published by 2K for PlayStation 3, OS X, Windows, Xbox 360, and Linux platforms. Episode One was released digitally on November 12, 2013, followed by Episode Two on March 25, 2014. A retail version was released as part of BioShock Infinite: The Complete Edition, and later included in BioShock: The Collection for PlayStation 4, Xbox One, and Nintendo Switch.

Burial at Sea is set after the events of Infinite, which spanned several alternate realities. Whereas Infinite takes place aboard the floating city Columbia, Burial at Sea primarily takes place in the underwater metropolis Rapture before the events of the first BioShock game. The game features Booker DeWitt as a private detective, and Elizabeth as a femme fatale who employs Booker's services.

Development of Infinite's downloadable content commenced immediately after finishing the main game. Irrational was drawn to returning to the setting of Rapture and using Infinite's gameplay systems to create a version of the city before its ruin in BioShock. Reception to Burial at Sea's two episodes was mixed. While the return to Rapture was generally praised, the first episode drew criticism for its short length and a lack of differentiated gameplay. Reviews for the second episode were more positive, with multiple critics calling Burial at Sea a fitting swan song for Irrational's work on BioShock, as the studio reorganized.

== Gameplay ==
Like BioShock Infinite, Burial at Sea is a first-person shooter with role-playing elements. The game is primarily set in the underwater city of Rapture, the setting of the original BioShock and BioShock 2. Gameplay mixes elements from Infinite's sandbox and those of earlier games in the series. The superpower-bestowing liquids, known as Vigors in Infinite, are reclassified as plasmids, their Rapture equivalent. Also returning with different names are the skyrails and skyhook from the base game. Unlike Infinite, players can carry more than two weapons at a time, although ammo is much scarcer, and not all weapons from Infinite return. New additions include the Old Man Winter plasmid, which functions similarly to the Winter Blast plasmid in the original BioShock, and the Radar Range weapon, which fires energy that explodes enemies.

In Episode Two, players assume the role of Elizabeth, and the gameplay shifts to emphasize stealth. Splashing in pools of water or walking across broken glass alerts enemies to the player's presence. A new plasmid, Peeping Tom, allows players to see through walls and scout ahead of them. Players are also equipped with a crossbow that can fire noisemakers, knockout gas, or tranquilizer darts. Episode Two includes a "1998 Mode" in which the player is challenged to complete the episode using only non-lethal methods of defeating enemies, a callback to Irrational precursor Looking Glass Studios' 1998 stealth title Thief: The Dark Project.

== Plot ==
Episode One begins on December 31, 1958. Elizabeth asks the private investigator Booker DeWitt to investigate the disappearance of a young girl named Sally; Booker believes Sally is dead, but Elizabeth says she has information to the contrary. The pair confront the artist Sander Cohen, who tells them Sally is in the Fontaine Department Store. The store was sunk and cut off from the rest of the city by Rapture's founder Andrew Ryan to serve as a prison for the followers of his believed-dead competitor, Frank Fontaine.

Within Fontaine's, Booker and Elizabeth look for Sally, fighting their way through the crazed remains of Fontaine's followers. Booker finds Sally, but discovers she has been turned into a "Little Sister"—a mentally conditioned and mutated girl, trained to produce and gather the material that fuels Rapture's genetic modifications. Booker has sudden flashbacks to events he had previously forgotten. Booker once went by the name Zachary Hale Comstock, and was the founder of the floating city of Columbia. Childless, Comstock enlisted the help of the scientists Robert and Rosalind Lutece to steal the infant Anna (who would grow up to be Elizabeth) from a version of Booker DeWitt in an alternate universe, but Anna was accidentally killed. Comstock was shamed by his actions and had the Lutece twins send him to Rapture, where he lost his memories and reassumed his identity as Booker Dewitt. Realizing what he has done, he tries to apologize to Elizabeth, but she rebuffs him, and Comstock is killed by an armored Big Daddy.

In Episode Two, Elizabeth wakes up from a nightmare of Paris in flames to find herself and Sally captured by Atlas (Frank Fontaine in disguise). A vision of Booker instructs Elizabeth to say that she knows how to get Atlas and his followers back to the city proper. Atlas agrees to hand over Sally in exchange. Elizabeth finds her own dead body, and realizes she had been killed by a Big Daddy; in returning to a universe where she died, all other alternate versions of herself have collapsed. Elizabeth has lost her previous ability to see through the multiverse and is unsure of why she decided to return to Rapture.

In the lab of scientist Yi Suchong, Elizabeth finds a portal to Columbia. Elizabeth hypothesizes that by acquiring some of the particles that keep Columbia afloat, she can lift Fontaine's building. She discovers that Suchong and Columbia industrialist Jeremiah Fink had shared technology, co-developing the Big Daddies and Elizabeth's former warden, the Songbird. Returning to the Fontaine building, Elizabeth succeeds in raising the department store, but Atlas reneges on their deal. After a botched attempt to drug her and learn the location of an "ace in the hole" Suchong had developed for Fontaine, Elizabeth awakens weeks later and finds the city beset by civil war. After Atlas threatens to torture Sally, Elizabeth agrees to retrieve the ace from Suchong's lab.

Elizabeth finds Suchong as he is killed by a Big Daddy for harming a Little Sister. With him is a coded message that Elizabeth realizes is the ace in the hole—the phrase "would you kindly", a trigger phrase that Suchong implanted in Jack (the protagonist from BioShock), the son of Ryan that Atlas has sent to the surface. Atlas orders his men to make arrangements for Jack to come to Rapture, and then beats Elizabeth to death with a wrench. In her final moments, Elizabeth has a vision of the events that will come to pass: Jack comes to Rapture, kills Ryan and Atlas, and saves Sally and the other Little Sisters.

A post-credits scene shows a shot of Rapture as a crashed plane sinks into the city, signaling Jack's arrival and the events of BioShock.

== Development ==
"There were some Columbia ideas we kicked around, but I think we also got to the point where we felt like that was the story that we had just told. We had told it to the extent we wanted to tell it. But I had this image in my head of this moment in this detective's office, Booker's office. Elizabeth walking in dressed like Veronica Lake. And I just fixated on that." — Ken Levine

Before BioShock Infinite's release, 2K and Irrational Games announced a season pass for the game. The pass promised three expansion packs as downloadable content (DLC) after launch. In discussing ideas for the DLC, Irrational gravitated towards returning to the city of Rapture, after the location had made a cameo appearance at the end of Infinite. Due to the ambitious nature and longer development of Burial at Sea, Irrational developed a smaller expansion, Clash in the Clouds, to tide players over. Irrational began work on the DLC immediately after finishing work on Infinite.

Compared to the base game, familiarity with Burial at Sea's game systems allowed the developers to focus on the story without as many considerations for how it would affect gameplay. The developers tried to respect the original gameplay of BioShock while integrating Infinite's combat sandbox. They pared down the number of plasmids and available ammo to make players think more strategically about engaging enemies. The gameplay for the content was altered to fit the setting and feel of Rapture compared to the larger battles of Infinite. Enemy awareness systems were retooled and environments redesigned to increase the focus on stealth and make the game feel more like BioShock. Though the developers could not change the gameplay wholesale, they focused on making the environments feel more oppressive and threatening, especially for when Elizabeth was a playable character.

The in-game setting of Rapture was recreated with very little reuse of assets from BioShock, as they did not hold up in the years since the game's release; they were instead used as reference to inform new assets. Instead of flat backdrops of the city outside windows in environments, the exterior cityscape was created with three-dimensional geometry. The added content includes new weapons, gear, and Plasmids (the Rapture equivalent of Vigors), as well as bringing back the mechanic of the "weapon wheel" that allows players to carry and select from multiple weapons. One of the new plasmids is Old Man Winter, which freezes and shatters enemies. The concept was created by Joe Trinder, a fan and graphic designer, shortly after the reveal of Infinite. The concept art, mimicking other in-game posters for Vigors, caught the attention of Levine, who decided to incorporate the concept within the Burial at Sea content with Trinder's help. The artwork was redesigned to match the Rapture setting, and influenced part of the level design where the plasmid would be found.

Levine noted that whereas BioShock was about environments, Infinite was about characters, and Burial at Sea continued the focus on the latter. Levine called Burial at Sea "Elizabeth's story", and an opportunity to have her play a larger role beyond the Booker and Elizabeth relationship. Producer Don Roy called the switch to Elizabeth being a playable character a natural progression from her role as an important secondary character in the base game. In the second episode, Elizabeth becomes the player character. Being more of a thoughtful character than Booker, her gameplay focuses more on strategy and avoidance of direct combat, more like a survival horror or stealth game. It was important that Elizabeth did not feel simply like Booker "in a dress". Amanda Jeffrey noted that Elizabeth was the main character of Infinite and Rapture the main character of the first game, and so "Burial" involved "our two leading ladies playing opposite each other". No longer being recently out of the tower, Elizabeth's character is slightly different in "Burial", being "older, wiser and more confident". In early previews of Burial at Sea, Irrational indicated that Elizabeth would be able to use her abilities to create "tears" to manipulate her environment, but in the final game this was removed in the second episode. Levine stated that the Burial at Sea would leave fans "walk[ing] away pretty satisfied with feeling a sense of completeness", with Courtnee Draper (voice of Elizabeth) calling it "the wrap-up for the whole BioShock series".

Burial at Sea was announced on July 30, 2013, alongside the rest of Infinite's downloadable content offerings. The first episode was released digitally on November 12, followed by Episode Two on March 25, 2014. The DLC was later bundled with the base game in a retail release, BioShock Infinite: The Complete Edition, in November 2014, and was also included along with the rest of the franchise single-player DLC in BioShock: The Collection in 2016.

== Reception ==
Aggregate review scores
Game	Metacritic
BioShock Infinite: Burial at Sea – Episode One	PC: 70/100; PS3: 76/100; X360: 68/100
BioShock Infinite: Burial at Sea – Episode Two	PC: 80/100; PS3: 83/100; X360: 84/100

Burial at Sea: Episode One received mixed reviews on most platforms, in comparison to Infinite's critical praise. Critics generally praised the return to Rapture; Game Informer's Joe Juba wrote that the opportunity to see the city in its prime would be worth the DLC's cost for BioShock fans, while Alec Meer of Rock Paper Shotgun said the opening parts of the game gave him exactly what he wanted out of a return to Rapture. Less favorably, critics such as GameSpot's Kevin VanOrd and PC Gamer's Phil Savage complained that the city felt populated by staged vignettes and "mannequins", rather than feeling alive. Eurogamer's Stace Harmen wrote that players' enjoyment of the first episode would be predicated on how much they enjoyed the first half of the game, and how much they accepted the staged, "not quite truly alive" Rapture.

Common complaints included the episode's short runtime, and the sudden shift to Fontaine's in the second half of the game. Juba said the switch "[started] feeling more like a retread" of previous games in the series. Critics such as Juba and VG247's Dave Cook felt that the new additions to the gameplay sandbox often did not distinguish themselves from Infinite, though IGN's Ryan McCaffrey considered the merging of Infinite and BioShock satisfying and faster-paced than the first game. Several reviews noted that the episode forced more strategic gameplay with its scarce resources, but the repetitious mission objectives and backtracking wore thin even over the short runtime. Wired's Chris Kohler wrote that the expansion felt like fan service and that the story would have been better served by an all-new setting instead of returning to Rapture. Levine defended the game's runtime as being due to a focus on quality versus quantity.

Episode Two was better received by critics, with generally favorable reviews on all platforms at Metacritic. McCaffrey, Hogarty, and Destructoid's Chris Carter were among those who felt the second episode redeemed the shortcomings of the first. The second chapter's switch to Elizabeth and slower, stealthy gameplay was well-received; The A.V. Club's Sam Barsanti appreciated that the smaller-scale story of Episode Two refocused on Elizabeth and more character-driven stakes than the main game. GamesTM considered Episode Two's focus on embracing the environment and hunting for story clues as better than any previous BioShock game. The episode was called a fitting end to Irrational's BioShock work. Criticisms included what VanOrd and Eurogamer's Björn Balg considered plot contrivances and inconsistencies. Justin McElroy of Polygon criticized the episode's focus on mysteries and confusing plot points, and wrote that the episode's attempts to wrap everything up "too often feels like well-made fan fiction".

Shortly before Episode Two was released, Levine revealed that the episode would be Irrational Games' last game in the BioShock series, leaving the intellectual property in the hands of 2K Games. 75 employees were laid off as the studio shut down. 2K would form a new studio, Cloud Chamber, to develop the next BioShock title, currently under development.

== See also ==
- List of underwater science fiction works
