= Lutece twins =

BioShock character

Lutece Twins
- BioShock characters
- Screenshot of a scene where the Lutece twins ask Booker DeWitt to flip a coin.
- First appearance: BioShock Infinite (2013)
- Created by: Ken Levine
- Designed by: Claire Hummel
- Voiced by: Oliver Vaquer (Robert Lutece); Jennifer Hale (Rosalind Lutece)

Robert Lutece and Rosalind Lutece, collectively known as the Lutece twins, are two characters from the BioShock video game series created by Ken Levine, published by 2K Games. They debut in the 2013 video game BioShock Infinite, where they serve as the drivers for the game's events and often materialize under mysterious circumstances to guide protagonist Booker DeWitt. By the game's end, both characters are eventually revealed to share no family relations, and are in fact parallel universe versions of the same individual. Robert and Rosalind are voiced by Oliver Vaquer and Jennifer Hale respectively. Concept artist Claire Hummel was responsible for the visual design of the Lutece twins.

Both characters as well as their voice actors have received a generally positive reception, and are frequently cited as one of the memorable aspects of Infinite by critics. Due to the vital role they play in the story of Infinite as the illustrators for some of its underlying themes, particularly the concept of "constants and variables", the Lutece twins have been extensively discussed in published writings which explore and discuss the aforementioned themes.

== Development and portrayal ==
Concept artist Claire Hummel was responsible for designing the Luteces. She was given minimal information about the characters, but otherwise had free rein to develop their visual design. The creative parameter set for Hummel was that they were a pair of "twins" in terms of their relationship dynamic, and that they were elegant and ethereal by nature. In her view, it is impractical to create the variety and cultural context of a given time period without being thoroughly familiar with the time period through its reference material. The Lutece twins ended up with more stylish and contemporary clothing compared to the rest of the cast, which is reflected by their true nature as time travelers. Hummel decided that the Luteces would have red hair, and that Rosalind in particular would wear a dress. The physical appearance of both characters reflected the commercial beauty ideal of their contemporary time period: Rosalind's hairstyle is inspired by the “Gibson Girl” look, and Robert's overall appearance evoke "The Arrow Collar Man” archetype. Robert was originally drawn with facial hair early in development, which was removed by the time the character's design was finalized. In terms of background lore, both characters were briefly described in the instructions Hummel received as the game setting's equivalent of Nikola Tesla.

Oliver Vaquer and Jennifer Hale voiced Robert and Rosalind respectively. According to Vaquer, he was initially told that the audition was for a project codenamed Icarus, and that he was only informed after having secured the role that it was for a BioShock game, a series which Vaquer claims to be intimately familiar with. He recalled that the lines for the audition was for both characters, but auditionees were to deliver them as "one conversation, one person" with a British accent. Both actors recorded their dialogue at the same time and location, which Hale noted is a rarity for actors in the video game industry. Hale said that it is essential for her to be well-prepared whenever she commences a recording session, as she had many factors and potential scenarios to consider beyond just recording lines from a script. Though physically separated in different booths, both actors were always within hearing distance of each other, which allowed them the opportunity to play off each other's line delivery as the characters are written to have a tendency to finish off each other's sentences. The actors had some degree of creative freedom, and were not obliged to strictly adhere to the minutiae of the game's script; according to Hale, the creative team would occasionally encourage them to ad-lib or improvise certain lines provided that there were no technical constraints. Both Vaquer and Hale had a very positive work experience with the developmental team of Infinite, and credited director Ken Levine for deftly guiding them through the recording process.

== Appearances ==
The Luteces are introduced as two mysterious individuals that take Booker on a boat to a lighthouse that enables airborne transportation to the floating city of Columbia. From then onwards, both individuals became the center of numerous odd phenomena encountered throughout Booker's travels in Columbia. They appear seemingly at random, often compelling the player through Booker to make seemingly trivial choices or providing cryptic advice about current objectives. In an early scene, they ask Booker to flip a coin, which has come up heads 122 times out of 122 flips, evidenced by tally marks on both sides of the sandwich board worn by the gentleman Lutece. The player may also collect portable voice recording devices called voxophones which contain personal messages from Rosalind at various locations. These recordings provides insight into Columbia and its mysteries, and allows players to deduce the extent of their involvement by piecing the audio logs together.

The Luteces are revealed over the course of Infinite's story to be parallel universe versions of the same person, which is the basis of their in-sync interactions with each other and their ability to finish each other’s thoughts. In the main timeline of BioShock Infinite, Rosalind Lutece is a physicist who developed the technology that made the floating city of Columbia a reality. During one of her experiments she met Robert Lutece, a male version of herself from another universe, whom she refers to as her "brother". The discovery of a machine at Rosalind's boarded up residence that could produce 'tears", fissures in dimensional time and space that offer a route to an alternate universe which does not exist in the current world, reveal that the Luteces initially worked for Father Zachary Hale Comstock, the leader of Columbia. They devised a plan to secure a child as the future successor for Comstock, who had become sterile as a result of the machine's effects on him, but later turned against him when they realize that Comstock uses the child, Elizabeth, to commit genocide by raining fire down on the 'Sodom below'. In retaliation, Comstock arranged for the deaths of the Luteces through a sabotage of the Lutece machine. The Luteces however survived the machine's malfunction, but find themselves in a quantum state of flux, where they are able to travel between universes freely and in turn cannot be affected by the phenomena of a given universe.

By the game's end, it is revealed that the player-controlled Booker DeWitt was taken from another reality and instructed by the Luteces to take Elizabeth away from Columbia under the pretense of having his gambling debts wiped away, in order to prevent a future in which she accepts her place as Comstock's chosen successor. Comstock is in fact an alternate version of Booker himself, who met Rosalind after assuming his new identity at some point in time and became obsessed with the concept of a racially pure paradise.

The Luteces also appear in BioShock Infinite: Burial at Sea, where it is revealed that they are responsible for orchestrating certain events, such as the Vox Populi 's violent revolution led by Daisy Fitzroy in the base game's story, the rehabilitation of a repentant Comstock who lives in a universe where the underwater city of Rapture exists, and Elizabeth's subsequent return to Rapture to liberate a little girl named Sally.

== Promotion and reception ==
Irrational Games staff made a video of the characters discussing the Character of the Year Award at the 2013 Spike VG, which is hosted on the YouTube channel of former staff member Neil David Carter. The characters have been subject of merchandise like the 1.5-inch piece BioShock Infinite Lutece coin, with Robert depicted on the "Alive" side and Rosalind on the "Dead" side.

The Lutece twins have received critical acclaim. They were named 2013's Character of the Year at the Spike VGX 2013, and by Destructoid staff for their Best of 2013 awards. The Lutece twins were named runners-up for Best New Character as part of Giant Bomb's 2013 Game of the Year Awards, and Best Character for Official Xbox Magazine's 2013 Awards. The Luteces have been the subject of fan labor works like cosplay and fan art. They have also been referenced outside of the BioShock series: noteworthy examples include a cameo appearance for an episode of My Little Pony: Friendship Is Magic.

Bryan Vore from Game Informer considered the characters to be his favorite part of Infinite due to the context they provide to its entire plot. Kirk Hamilton from Kotaku praised the Luteces for their "dry humour" and "natty sense of style" amid a severe tone of self-seriousness and satirical caricature throughout much of BioShock Infinite, and felt that they are well explained within the game's lore in spite of its complex story. The Guardian staff included Rosalind Lutece, a pivotal character to the world of BioShock Infinite, among their list of "30 truly interesting female game characters". Johnny Cullen considered Rosalind to be one of Hale's most notable roles, praising the "brilliant' performances from both Hale and her counterpart Oliver Vaquer.

Analyzing Claire Hummel's work on characters like the Luteces, Heli Salomaa remarked that her work as an assigned costume concept artist was further from fashion designer’s than costume designer’s position, but the full potential of utilizing costume narration was insufficient without further personality content and deeper analysis of the characters. To Salomaa, designing aspects of a historical period for any medium requires thorough familiarization with the collection of historical references, as it adds legitimacy and depth to the character, as costume history offers an endless selection of various authentic styles and guides the consistency of the art style.
