= Shallow Grave (1987 film) =

- Directed by: Richard Styles
- Screenplay by: George Fernandez
- Produced by: Barry H. Waldman
- Starring: Tony March; Lisa Stahl; Tom Law
- Cinematography: Orson Orchoa
- Edited by: Carolyn Horton
- Music by: Mason Daring
- Production company: ELF Productions
- Distributed by: Prism Entertainment
- Release date: September 25, 1987
- Running time: 90 minutes
- Country: United States
- Language: English
- Budget: $750,000

Shallow Grave is a 1987 American slasher film directed by Richard Styles and starring Tony March and Lisa Stahl. Its plot follows a group of young women traveling through the Southern United States who are stalked by a psychotic sheriff after witnessing him commit a murder.

== Plot ==
University students Sue Ellen, Patty, Rose, and Cindy plan a spring break road trip from Virginia to Fort Lauderdale, Florida. At a diner in Georgia, the women meet two young men their age, Chad and Owen, who are also traveling to Florida. The women agree to catch up with the men the next day during the trip. The next day, while approaching the rural town of Medley, the women's car suffers a tire blowout, stranding them. Patty walks toward the town to get help while the others stay behind. Sue Ellen ventures into the woods to urinate, and stumbles upon a man, Dean, and his mistress, Angie, having sex. Sue Ellen watches from a distance as the couple begin to argue over their affair, culminating in Dean killing Angie by breaking her neck. Horrified, Sue Ellen flees, as Dean—the local Medley sheriff—places Angie's corpse in his car. While running, Sue Ellen injures her ankle, preventing her from moving quickly.

Dean, realizing there are witnesses nearby, reaches the women's car before Sue Ellen does, and begins shooting his pistol at Rose and Cindy. One of the bullets strikes Cindy in the head, killing her immediately. Rose flees through the woods as Dean chases after her. Simultaneously, Sue Ellen arrives back at the car, only to find Rose and Cindy missing. She removes the car keys from the trunk hatch, and is subsequently met by Patty, returning to the car after having located a gas station. A panicked Sue Ellen explains to Patty what she witnessed, and the two depart back toward the gas station on foot. Moments later, Rose, having led Dean on a chase through the woods, returns to the car. She glimpses Sue Ellen and Patty down the road in the distance, and attempts to use the car horn to get their attention, but is caught by Dean, who strangles her.

Dean buries the corpses of Angie, Cindy, and Rose in a shallow grave in the woods. Meanwhile, Chad and Owen begin to worry when the women fail to meet them, and decide to backtrack to search for them in Medley. Patty and Sue Ellen reach the closed gas station, where Sue Ellen is attacked by a security dog that injures her arm. They are subsequently met by Deputy Scott, who brings them to the county jail for questioning before holding them. Sheriff Dean arrives shortly after and questions the women, but Sue Ellen does not recognize him. Scott begins to investigate the disappearance of Angie, a barmaid at the local tavern, oblivious to the fact that Dean had been carrying on an affair with her. Dean suggests that Sue Ellen and Patty are responsible for Angie's and their friends' disappearances.

When Dean encounters Scott treating Sue Ellen and Patty hospitably at the station, he grows angry, and begins to yell at them. In doing so, Sue Ellen recognizes his voice, and realizes that Dean was the man she witnessed committing the murder. That afternoon, the shallow grave containing the three bodies is uncovered by Eli, the property owner, who phones the police. Scott investigates the scene, and when Dean is notified, he attempts to kidnap Sue Ellen and Patty, but the women manage to flee the jail. Dean summons Scott to help capture the women, whom he attempts to frame for the murders. Meanwhile, after the bodies are removed from the crime scene, Eli discovers Dean's sheriff badge in the dirt.

Patty is captured and returned to the jail by Scott, who disbelieves her claims that Dean is the killer. Dean meanwhile enlists a band of local vigilantes to hunt Sue Ellen, authorizing them to shoot her on sight, while he returns to the jail and strangles Patty, staging it to appear as a suicide. Sue Ellen is ultimately saved from the vigilantes by Scott just as Owen and Chad arrive on the scene, followed by the paramedics and Sheriff Dean. Sue Ellen is placed in an ambulance, which Dean insists on riding along in; he tells Scott he hopes she will confess to the murders. As the ambulance prepares to depart, Eli approaches Scott with Sheriff Dean's badge, which he says he found in the shallow grave on his property. Realizing that Dean is guilty, Scott looks in horror as the ambulance drives away, aware that Dean will inevitably murder Sue Ellen en route to the hospital.

== Cast ==
- Tony March as Sheriff Dean
- Lisa Stahl as Sue Ellen
- Tom Law as Deputy Scott
- Carol Cadby as Patty
- Donna Baltron as Rose
- Just Kelly as Cindy
- Vincent Tumeo as Chad (as Vince Turner)
- Gregg Todd Davis as Owen
- Merry Rozelle as Angie
- Roy Smart as Eliah

== Production ==
Shallow Grave was filmed on location in Florida on a budget of $750,000.

== Release ==
Shallow Grave received a regional theatrical release in the United States, showing in Tennessee in late-September 1987.

=== Home media ===
Vinegar Syndrome released Shallow Grave on Blu-ray in 2021.
