= Courtnee Draper =

American actress

- Born: Courtnee Alyssa Draper; April 24, 1985 (age 41); Orlando, Florida, U.S.
- Education: Loyola Law School
- Occupation: Actress
- Years active: 1998–present
- Children: 2

Courtnee Alyssa Draper (born April 24, 1985) is an American actress. She is best known for her roles as Morgan Hudson in The Jersey, Sam in The Thirteenth Year, Megan Larson in Stepsister from Planet Weird, Elizabeth in BioShock Infinite and Sarah Whitaker in Days Gone. For her performance in BioShock Infinite, Draper was nominated for a British Academy Games Award for Performer and won a Spike Video Game Award (Best Song) for her performance of "Will the Circle Be Unbroken" in the game (Draper later additionally recorded a version of "You Belong to Me" for the game's follow-up, Burial at Sea). Draper was also a cast member on The Bold and the Beautiful from April to October 2002 as Erica Lovejoy.

Draper was born at the Naval Hospital in Orlando, Florida. Her mother served in the military. As a result, she has resided in and visited many areas of the United States (including Florida, Pennsylvania, Rhode Island, Arizona, and Hawaii) and Asia (including Japan, Okinawa, Korea and Hong Kong). She was introduced to old films and musicals at age five while living in Okinawa, Japan. Draper graduated from Loyola Law School in Los Angeles.

== Filmography ==
| Year | Title | Role | Notes |
|---|---|---|---|
| 1998 | The Modern Adventures of Tom Sawyer | Susan | |
| 1998 | Magic Jersey | Morgan Hudson | Television film |
| 1998 | The Room | Phyfutima | Short film |
| 1998 | Home Improvement | Erica | Episode: "Mr. Likeable" |
| 1999 | Pacific Blue | Lauren Chandler | Episode: "Lucky 13" |
| 1999 | The Thirteenth Year | Samantha "Sam" | Television film |
| 1999 | The Duke | Charlotte | |
| 1999–2004 | The Jersey | Morgan Hudson | 56 episodes |
| 2000 | Kidnap Madonna's Baby | Helen | Short film |
| 2000 | Stepsister from Planet Weird | Megan Larson | Television film |
| 2002 | The Biggest Fan | Brittany Holland | |
| 2002 | The Cat Returns | Additional Voices | |
| 2002 | The Yard Sale | Sophie | Short film |
| 2002 | The Bold and the Beautiful | Erica Lovejoy | 86 episodes |
| 2002 | Buffy the Vampire Slayer | Annabelle | Episode: "Bring on the Night" |
| 2004 | Tru Calling | Melissa Sumner | Episode: "Two Pair" |
| 2004 | Sleepover | Girl at Dance | |
| 2004 | The Days | Emma | 5 episodes |
| 2004 | Veronica Mars | Darcy | Episode: "Drinking the Kool-Aid" |
| 2005 | Eyes | Lindsay Baker | Episode: "Trial" |
| 2006 | CSI: Miami | Mandy Creighton | Episode: "Open Water" |
| 2006 | The Immaculate Misconception | Mary Flanagan | |
| 2007 | Campus Ladies | Lara | Episode: "Safety First" |
| 2007 | Surf's Up | Various Female Penguin Characters | |
| 2007 | Ghost Whisperer | Allison | Episode: "Don't Try This at Home" |
| 2008 | Ponyo | Young Mother (voice) | |
| 2008 | Booth Girls | Tiffany/Queen Natalia | Short film |
| 2009 | Bored to Death | Extra | Episode: "The Alanon Case" |

=== Video games ===
| Year | Title | Role | Note |
|---|---|---|---|
| 2005 | Kingdom Hearts II | Additional voices | |
| 2013 | BioShock Infinite | Elizabeth | |
| 2013 | Alien Rage | Karen | |
| 2013–14 | BioShock Infinite: Burial at Sea | Elizabeth / Sally | |
| 2014 | Disney Infinity: Marvel Super Heroes | White Tiger | |
| 2015 | Final Fantasy Type-0 HD | Clemente | |
| 2015 | Disney Infinity 3.0 | White Tiger | |
| 2019 | Days Gone | Sarah Whitaker | |
| 2020 | Final Fantasy VII Remake | Additional Voices | |
