= List of fictional characters with disabilities =

Fictional characters with disabilities appear in various mediums, including novels, comics, television, and movies. A disability may be readily visible, or invisible in nature. Some examples of invisible disabilities include intellectual disabilities, autism spectrum disorder, attention deficit hyperactivity disorder, mental disorders, asthma, epilepsy, allergies, migraines, arthritis, and chronic fatigue syndrome.

Due to the number of entries, autistic fictional characters are listed on their own page and are not included here.

== Literature ==
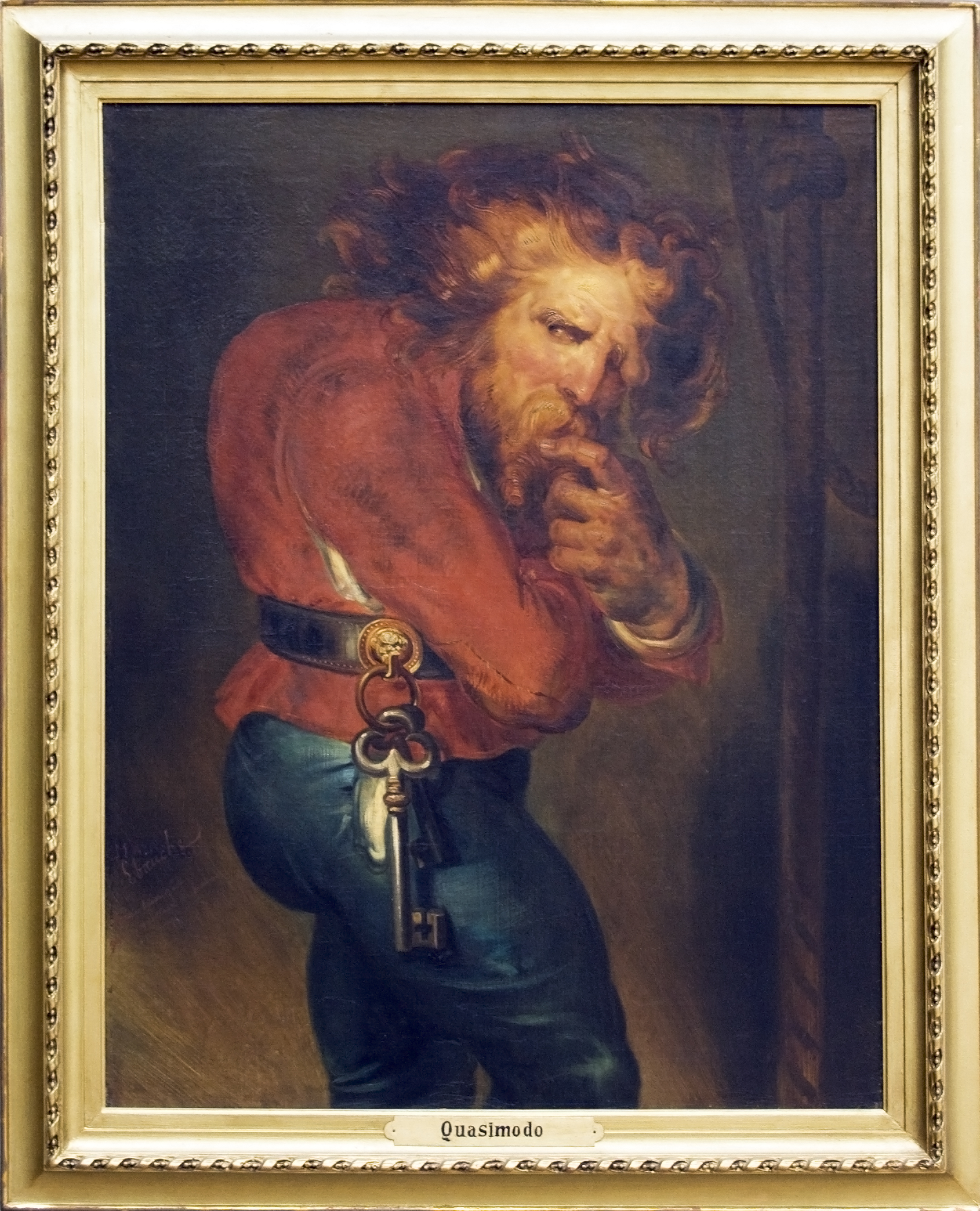
A painting of Quasimodo by Antoine Wiertz

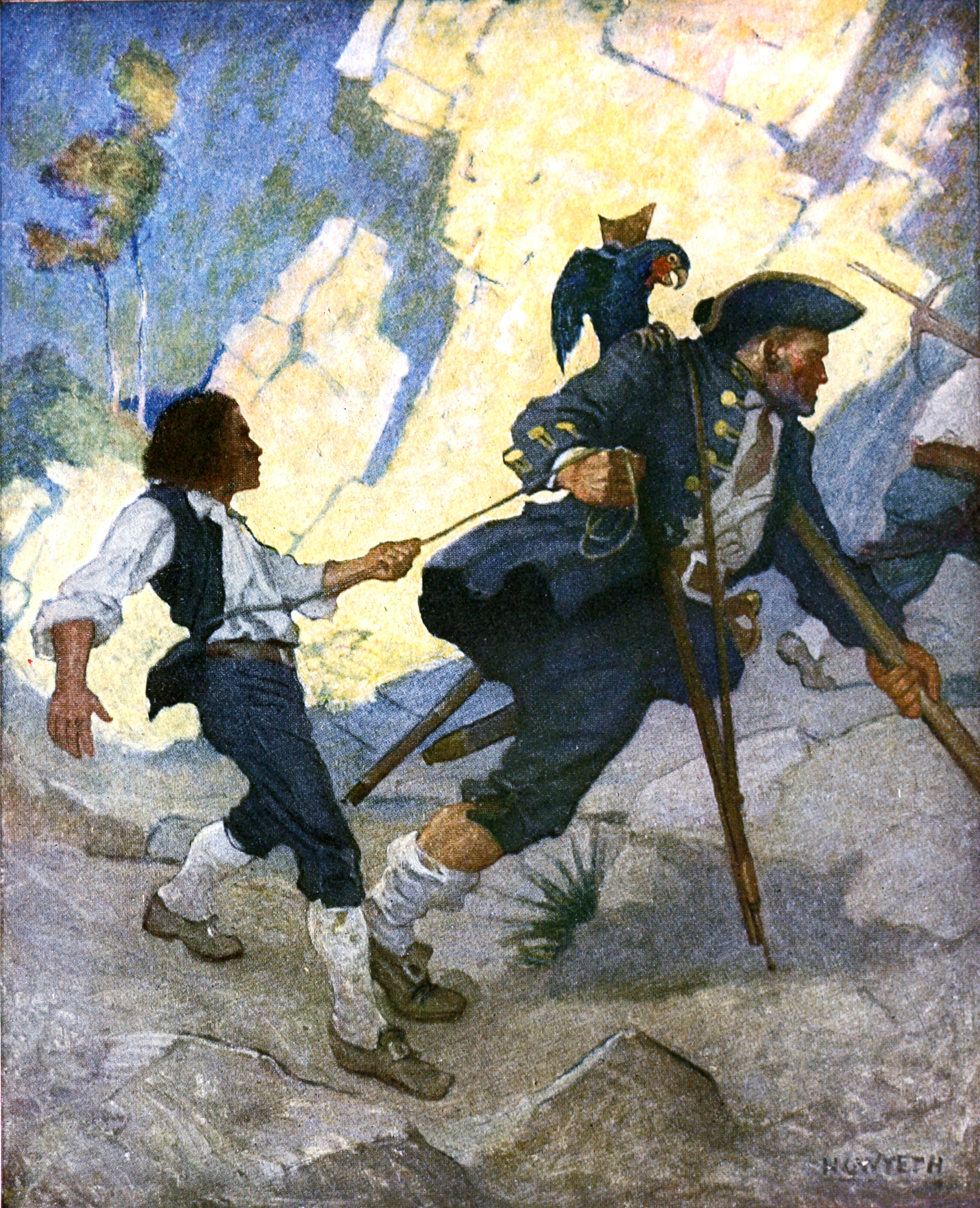
An illustration of Long John Silver by N. C. Wyeth

Year	Character	Book(s)	Author(s)	Disability	Ref.
1818	The Monster	Frankenstein	Mary Shelley	A man made from the bodies of other people, imperfect, abused because of his visible differences and communication disabilities.	
1818	DeLacey	Frankenstein	Mary Shelley	An old blind man who cannot see the monster and is not prejudiced against him.	
1831	Quasimodo	The Hunchback of Notre-Dame	Victor Hugo	A hunchback, is half-blind, and becomes deaf due to living in the bell tower of the cathedral.	
1838	Smike	Nicholas Nickleby	Charles Dickens	Deformed limbs and intellectual and communication difficulties related to the abuse he suffered.	
1843	Tiny Tim	A Christmas Carol	Charles Dickens	Believed to have had either rickets, tuberculosis, polio, or cerebral palsy.	
1851	Captain Ahab	Moby-Dick	Herman Melville	Leg was bitten off by a whale.	
1883	Long John Silver	Treasure Island	Treasure Island	A pirate with a missing leg, and eyepatch and another who has lost his sight.	
1883	Blind Pew	Treasure Island	Treasure Island	A pirate with a missing leg, and eyepatch and another who has lost his sight.	
1904	Captain Hook	Peter and Wendy	J. M. Barrie	Missing hand	
1911	Colin Craven	The Secret Garden	Frances Hodgeson Burnett	Is described as a hunchback and an inability to walk.	
1928	Clifford	Lady Chatterley's Lover	D. H. Lawrence	Wheelchair user. Clifford's disability is a significant metaphorical form in the novel.	
1937	Lennie Small	Of Mice and Men	John Steinbeck	A migrant worker with learning and communication disabilities. He relies on his best friend for support.	
1937	Candy	Of Mice and Men	John Steinbeck	An old man with a stooped posture and no right hand, which he lost in an accident on the ranch.	
1937	Crooks	Of Mice and Men	John Steinbeck	Has a crooked spine from an accident with a horse. Crooks is doubly marginalized by his disability and race.	
1955	Jemima	The Railway Series	Wilbert Awdry	Deaf	
1964	Barquentine	Gormenghast series	Mervyn Peake	One-legged, hunchbacked dwarf.	
1966	Charlie Gordon	Flowers for Algernon	Daniel Keyes	Mild intellectual disability	
1973	Mr Johnny Gotobed	Carrie's War	Nina Bawden	Both communication and learning disabilities.	
1978	Walter	Walter	David Cook	Both communication and learning disabilities.	
1991	Mara Jade	Star Wars:Thrawn trilogy	Timothy Zahn	Mara has psychological trauma from her time as the Emperor's Hand and her subsequent path to redemption.	
1996	Tyrion Lannister	A Song of Ice and Fire	George R. R. Martin	An unspecified type of dwarfism and severe facial disfigurement.	
2001	Shawn	Stuck In Neutral	Terry Trueman	Cerebral palsy	
2012	Adam Parrish	The Raven Cycle	Maggie Stiefvater	Becomes deaf in his left ear due to abuse.	
2012	Hazel Grace Lancaster, Augustus Waters, and several other characters	The Fault in our Stars	John Green	The book is about characters with several types of cancer and resulting disabilities including a blind character and one with a prosthetic leg.	
2012	Melody Brooks	Out of My Mind	Sharon M. Draper	Cerebral palsy	
2012	August Pullman	Wonder	R.J. Palacio	Facial difference	
2015	Kaz Brekker	Six of Crows	Leigh Bardugo	Kaz has a limp and uses a cane.	
2025	Romea "Ro" Marino	Pasta Girls	Taylor Tracy	Attention deficit hyperactivity disorder	

== Live-action films ==
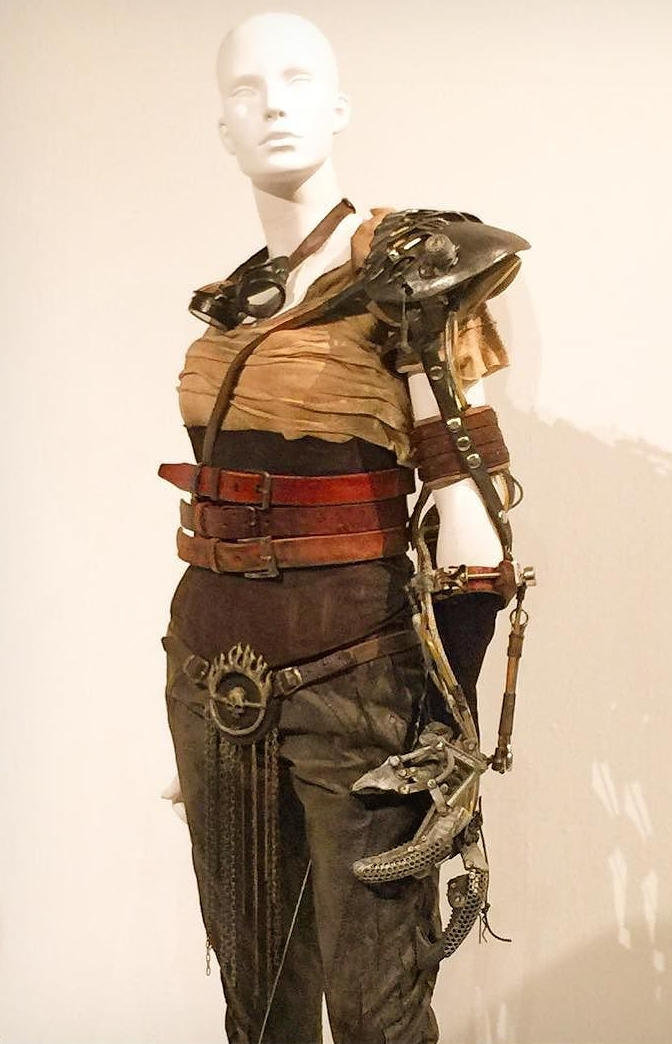
The costume of Imperator Furiosa used in Mad Max: Fury Road, featuring her prosthetic arm

Year	Character	Film	Disability	Actor	Ref.
1977	Darth Vader	Star Wars A New Hope	Lost his right arm in Star Wars: Attack of the Clones and loses his left arm and both of his legs in Star Wars: Revenge of the Sith.	David Prowse, James Earl Jones, Hayden Christensen, among others	
1980	Luke Skywalker	Star Wars The Empire Strikes Back	Has a prosthetic right hand after losing it. In the Star Wars Expanded Universe/Legends Continuity, Luke's right hand was used to create a clone called Luuke.	Mark Hamill	
1980	Jason Voorhees	Friday the 13th	Hydrocephalus and deformity	Several people	
1984	Freddy Krueger	A Nightmare on Elm Street	Face disfigurement, burn injures	Several people	
2002	Charles Xavier	X-Men	Wheelchair user	Patrick Stewart	
2002	Bill Porter	Door to Door	Cerebral palsy	Williams H. Macey	
2003	Leatherface	The Texas Chainsaw Massacre (2003)	Mentally disabled, face disfigurement	Andrew Bryniarski, among others	
2004	John Kramer/Jigsaw	Saw	Terminal cancer	Tobin Bell	
2004	Lawrence Gordon	Saw	Lawrence cuts off his right foot in order to escape from a chain and go look for help. In Saw 3D he gets a prosthetic right foot and uses a cane.	Cary Elwes	
2006	Mark Hoffman	Saw	Psychological trauma and disfigurement. He gets disfigured in Saw VI after ripping a part of his right cheek off in order to escape from a reverse bear trap and stitches his cheek in Saw 3D.	Costas Mandylor	
2007	Art Honeyman	Music Within	Cerebral palsy	Michael Sheen	
2008	Brit Stevenson	Saw V	Both Stevenson and Scott sacrifice one of their arms in order to get blood in the machine for their trap. Mallick would appear in Saw 3D as a cameo and wears a cast on his arm.	Julie Benz	
2008	Mallick Scott	Saw V	Both Stevenson and Scott sacrifice one of their arms in order to get blood in the machine for their trap. Mallick would appear in Saw 3D as a cameo and wears a cast on his arm.	Greg Bryk	
2009	Simone Bethson	Saw VI	Simone cuts off her left arm to give herself enough flesh to survive her game. Simone would appear in Saw 3D as a cameo and gets a prosthetic left arm.	Tanedra Howard	
2015	Imperator Furiosa	Mad Max: Fury Road	She is missing an arm and uses a mechanical prosthetic.	Charlize Theron	
2016	Dr. Strange	Marvel Cinematic Universe (first appearance in Doctor Strange)	Nerve damage to his hands with tremors	Benedict Cumberbatch	
2021	Makkari	Eternals	Deaf	Lauren Ridloff	
2023	Oompa Loompa	Wonka	Short stature	Hugh Grant	
2024	Nessarose	Wicked	Wheelchair user	Marissa Bode	

== Live-action television ==
First year	Character	Series	Disability	Actor	Ref.
1968	Detective Columbo	Columbo	Vision impairment	Peter Falk	
1987	Geordi La Forge	Star Trek: The Next Generation	Blind since birth, and uses technological devices to allow him to see.	LeVar Burton	
1994	Kerry Weaver	ER	Limp in her gait due to congenital hip dysplasia	Laura Innes	
2000	Barquentine	Gormenghast	Physical disability	Warren Mitchell	
2002	Butchie	The Wire	Blind	S. Robert Morgan	
2003	Pete Hamil	Hollyoaks	Wheelchair user	Peter Mitchell	
2004	Gregory House	House M.D.	Partial loss of use in his leg and chronic pain. Cane and vicodin user.	Hugh Laurie	
2008	Walter White Jr.	Breaking Bad	Cerebral palsy, uses crutches.	RJ Mitte	
2008	Hector Salamanca	Breaking Bad	Wheelchair user	Mark Margolis	
2009	Arthur "Artie" Abrams	Glee	Paraplegic wheelchair user	Kevin McHale	
2010	Izzy Armstrong	Coronation Street	Wheelchair user	Cherylee Houston	
2011	Tyrion Lannister	Game of Thrones	Short stature (dwarfism)	Peter Dinklage	
2011	Warwick Davis	Life's Too Short	Short stature (dwarfism)	Warwick Davis	
2014	Donna Yates	EastEnders	Short stature (dwarfism) and wheelchair user	Lisa Hammond	
2015	Alex Warner	Coronation Street	Down syndrome	Liam Bairstow	
2016	Courtney Campbell	Hollyoaks	Wheelchair user	Amy Conachan	
2017	Imogen Pascoe	Coronation Street	Limb difference	Melissa Johns	
2018	Penny Stevenson	Doctors	Was born with a right arm that ends just below the elbow.	Cerrie Burnell	
2018	Ryan Stocks	Emmerdale	Cerebral palsy	James Moore	
2018	Connie	The Walking Dead	Deaf	Lauren Ridloff	
2020	Rebecca	Never Have I Ever	Down syndrome	Lily D. Moore	
2022	Freya Calder	Hollyoaks	Wheelchair user	Ellie Henry	
2022	Bobby Crawford	Coronation Street	Cerebral palsy	Jack Carroll	
2022	Willow Ulfgood	Willow	Short stature (dwarfism)	Warwick Davis	
2023	Kirsty Millar	Doctors	Dwarfism	Kiruna Stamell	
2023	Lacey Lloyd	Hollyoaks	Short stature (dwarfism)	Annabell Davis	
2024	Oswald 'Oz' Cobb	The Penguin	Physical disability	Colin Farrell	
2024	Victor Aguilar	The Penguin	Stammer	Rhenzy Feliz	

== Animated films and TV series ==
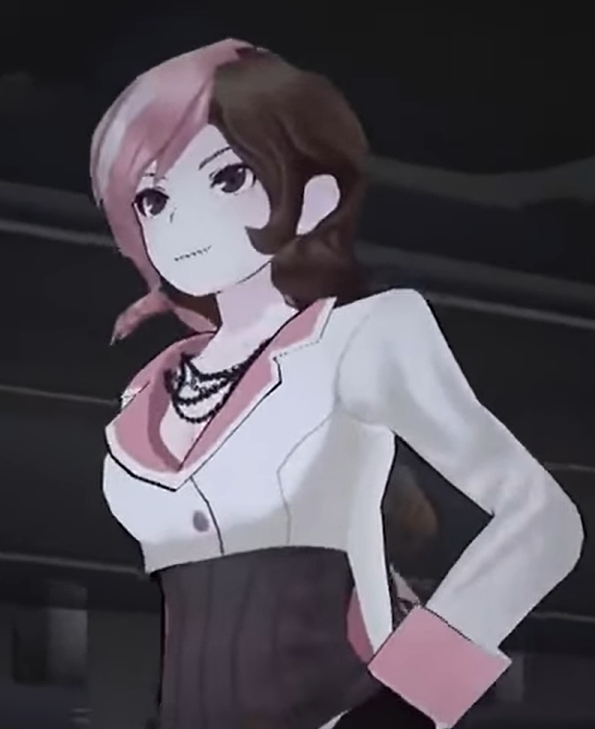
Neopolitan from RWBY is mute

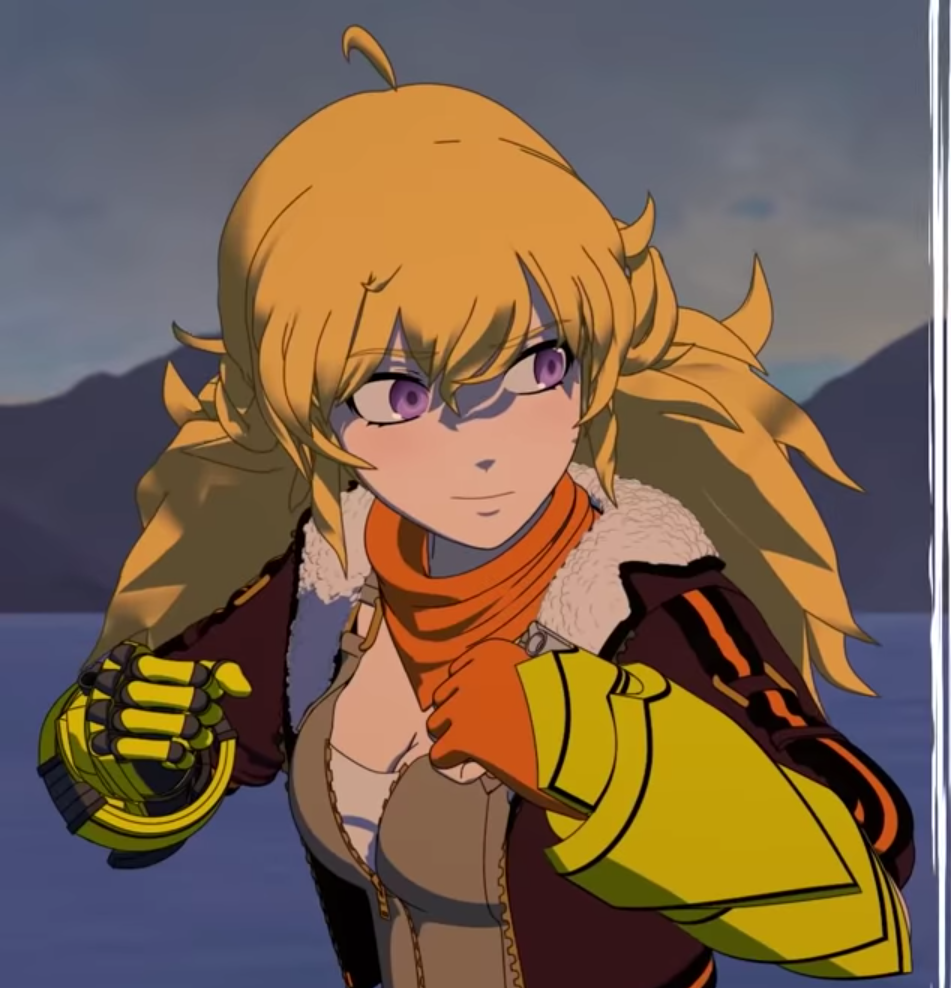
Yang Xiao Long from RWBY has a cybernetic prosthetic right arm and deals with PTSD

First year	Character	Title	Disability	Voice actor	Ref.
1937	Daffy Duck	Looney Tunes	Speech disorder	Mel Blanc, among others	
1938	Elmer Fudd	Looney Tunes	Speech disorder and stuttering	Mel Blanc, among others	
1969	Scooby-Doo	Scooby-Doo	Speech disorder	Numerous people	
1979	André Grandier	Rose of Versailles	Loses sight in his left eye and his condition slowly worsens until he is completely blind.	Tarô Shigaki	
1987	Bart Simpson	The Simpsons	Attention deficit hyperactivity disorder	Nancy Cartwright	
1992	Gabriella	The Little Mermaid	Deaf and mute, Gabriella is able to communicate through sign language.	—N/a	
1997	Ned Gerblanski	South Park	Missing his right arm, speaks with an electrolarynx.	Trey Parker	
1999	Joe Swanson	Family Guy	Paraplegic and uses a wheelchair.	Patrick Warburton	
2000	Timmy Burch	South Park	Has both cerebral palsy and Tourette's, wheelchair user.	Trey Parker	
2001	Jimmy Valmer	South Park	Ataxic cerebral palsy, exotropia, use of crutches to assist in equinus and crouch gait.	Trey Parker	
2001	Gingerbread "Gingy" Man	Shrek	Gingy has both of his legs broken by Lord Farquaad. He would get new legs put on him with some strong icing.	Conrad Vernon	
2003	Casey Jones	Teenage Mutant Ninja Turtles	In this universe, Casey has PTSD after the death of his father.	Marc Thompson	
2003	Baxter Stockman	Teenage Mutant Ninja Turtles	In this universe, Stockman was tortured and disfigured for his failures to take down the turtles until he became nothing more than a brain and eye.	Scott Williams	
2003	Michelangelo	Teenage Mutant Ninja Turtles	In a different universe, Michelangelo lost his left arm and Raphael lost his left eye.	Wayne Grayson	
2003	Raphael	Teenage Mutant Ninja Turtles	In a different universe, Michelangelo lost his left arm and Raphael lost his left eye.	Greg Abbey	
2003	Dory	Finding Nemo	Short-term memory	Ellen DeGeneres	
2003	Richard "Dick" Grayson	Teen Titans	In this universe, Dick has trauma which stems heavily from his intense drive for perfection, and his psychological and physical torment by the villain Slade.	Scott Menville	
2003	Slade Wilson	Teen Titans	In this universe, after Slade was killed by Terra, he was resurrected by Trigon in an undead form.	Ron Perlman	
2003	Helen	Sonic X	Wheelchair user	Noriko Hidaka	
2004	Nathan	South Park	Down syndrome and possible sociopathy.	Trey Parker	
2004	Puss in Boots	Shrek	Panic attacks	Antonio Banderas	
2005	Rat King	Teenage Mutant Ninja Turtles	Lost his left eye	David Zen Mansley	(Note: Shown in episode "I, Monster")
2006	Toph Beifong	Avatar: The Last Airbender	Blind	Michaela Jill Murphy	
2006	Nunnally Lamperouge	Code Geass	Blind and a wheelchair user	Kaori Nazuka	
2008	Scott Malkinson	South Park	Type 1 diabetes and a speech impediment.	Matt Stone	
2008	Lizzy Taylor	Postman Pat	Wheelchair user	Angelina Griffin (TV series); Becky Wright (Postman Pat: The Movie)	
2008	Po Ping	Kung Fu Panda	PTSD	Jack Black	
2008	Captain K'nuckles	The Marvelous Misadventures of Flapjack	His hands, legs, and bottom are wooden prosthetics.	Brian Doyle-Murray	
2009	Pops Maellard	Regular Show	Pops has a brain injury after being accidentally run over by a cart.	Sam Marin	(Note: shown in the episode "Prank Callers")
2010	Hiccup	How to Train Your Dragon	Has a prosthetic left leg	Jay Baruchel	
2010	Gobber the Belch	How to Train Your Dragon	Has a prosthetic left arm and right leg	Craig Ferguson	
2010	Finn the Human	Adventure Time	Beginning in Season 6, he has a robotic, prosthetic arm, and previously a grass sword coming from his arm.	Jeremy Shada	
2010	Pinkie Pie	My Little Pony	Attention deficit hyperactivity disorder	Andrea Libman and Shannon Chan-Kent	
2011	Scootaloo	My Little Pony	Physical disability	Madeleine Peters and Arielle Tuliao	
2011	Ayase Shinomiya	Guilty Crown	Wheelchair user	Kana Hanazawa	
2011	Heinz Doofenshmirtz (2nd Dimension)	Phineas and Ferb the Movie: Across the 2nd Dimension	He has an eye-patch with a scar running over it, which covers his left eye socket.	Dan Povenmire	
2011	No Rules Man	Regular Show	Wears an eyepatch on his right eye	Roger Craig Smith	(Note: Shown in episode "House Rules")
2012	Techmo/Sampson	Regular Show	A veteran of the American War who lost an arm and an eye, initially using a wooden prosthetic arm carved by Skips before receiving bionic and cybernetic enhancements (bionic arm and eye) as a technomancer.	Steve Blum	
2012	Leonardo	Teenage Mutant Ninja Turtles	In this universe, Leonardo has his larynx damaged after a fight against Shredder.	Jason Biggs and Seth Green	
2012	Korra	The Legend of Korra	Post-traumatic stress disorder	Janet Varney	
2013	General James Ironwood	RWBY	Has robotic prosthetics.	Jason Rose	(Note: Much of his body is made of mechanical prosthetics...Kerry Shawcross [said]...once you see he's part metal the audience can put the pieces together)
2013	Neopolitan	RWBY	Mute		(Note: that hoped-for voice actress...never solidified...with no approved voice for the character, Neo remained quiet in her debut—a decision which resulted in her most famous quality.)
2013	Yang Xiao Long	RWBY	Has a cybernetic prosthetic right arm and deals with PTSD.	Barbara Dunkelman	(Note: [in] Volume 3...Yang grapples with the loss of her arm...though Yang's injury doesn't happen until late in RWBY's third volume, Barbara Dunkelman knew about it from the start...Ironwood...gives Yang a robotic arm after she loses a limb during the Battle of Beacon...among Adam's crimes is his severing of Yang's arm during the Battle of Beacon)
2014	Mimori Tougou	Yuki Yuna Is a Hero	Wheelchair user.	Suzuko Mimori	
2014	Hannah Sparkes	Fireman Sam	Wheelchair user	Jo Wyatt (2014–2023); Tia Chapman (2024); Margaret Brock (US)	
2016	Izetta	Izetta: The Last Witch	Wheelchair user	Himika Akaneya	
2017	Red Action	OK K.O.! Let's Be Heroes	A cyborg teenage girl who is missing a leg and uses a prosthetic.	Kali Hawk	
2018	Violet Evergarden	Violet Evergarden	Uses metal prosthetic arms and has prosthetic hands.	Yui Ishikawa	
2019	Kerfuffle	My Little Pony: Rainbow Roadtrip	Uses a wooden prosthetic leg for her back left hoove.	Racquel Belmonte	
2019	Cassandra Cain	Young Justice	In this universe, Cassandra's mother, Lady Shiva, cut out her vocal cords, making her mute. This choice drew mixed reactions from critics and fans for changing the source of her disability.	—N/a	
2021	Viktor	Arcane	Born with a congenital walking disability requiring a cane, axillary crutches, and leg/back braces, he also develops a terminal illness from toxic exposure in the Undercity.	Harry Lloyd	
2021	Sevika	Arcane	An amputee who uses a high-tech shimmervoltage-powered prosthetic arm.	Amirah Vann	
2023	Ringo	Blue Eye Samurai	Amputee	Masi Oka	
2023	Ballister Boldheart	Nimona	Missing arm	Riz Ahmed	
2026	George Pig	Peppa Pig	Diagnosed as moderately deaf in series 9	Kira Monteith	
2026	Pavi	Avatar: Seven Havens	A young orphan living in the city of Ellora who has an artificial peg leg.	Saheli Khan	

== Comics, manga, and manhwa ==
First year	Character	Series/Franchise	Author/Publisher	Disability	Ref.
1939	Batman	Detective Comics, Batman	DC Comics	Bruce has post-traumatic stress disorder due to the death of his parents and many other events like the death of Jason Todd.	
1941	Wonder Woman	All Star Comics, Wonder Woman	DC Comics	In the Absolute Universe, Wonder Woman sacrifices her right arm in order for Steve Trevor to be able to get back home to earth. She has a mechanical prosthetic arm until her arm is regrown from the combination of blood and fire.	(Note: Absolute Wonder Woman (2024) #3)
1941	Aquaman	Aquaman comics	DC Comics	In various continuities, Aquaman uses a harpoon hook as a hand prosthesis.	
1941	Penguin	Detective Comics, Batman	DC Comics	The Penguin has dwarfism. In some continuities, he is depicted with flipper-like hands.	
1942	Two-Face	Detective Comics, Batman	DC Comics	Dissociative identity disorder and burn injuries.	
1943	Cheetah	Wonder Woman	DC Comics	The Priscilla Rich version of Cheetah has dissociative identity disorder.	
1943	Cheetah	Wonder Woman	DC Comics	The Barbara Minerva version of Cheetah was mystically empowered by the god Urzkartaga, but was cursed due to not being a virgin. As a result, she is crippled in her human form and uses a cane for mobility.	
1948	Riddler	Detective Comics, Batman	DC Comics	Obsessive–compulsive disorder	
1952	Firefly	Detective Comics, Batman	DC Comics	Burn scars on most of his body	(Note: Detective Comics (1937) #727) (Note: In Arkham Origins, it is revealed that Garfield has burns on 90 percent of his body. This makes the version of Garfield from the Arkham series have total body surface area as well.)
1958	Garth Ranzz (Lightning Lad)	Legion of Super-Heroes	DC Comics	In the Legion's original continuity and the 1994 reboot, Ranzz lost his right arm in battle and was given a prosthetic. In later continuities, Ranzz's arm is left intact.	
1959	Kara Zor-El	Action Comics, Superman	DC Comics	Psychological trauma and depression	
1959	Mr. Freeze	Detective Comics, Batman	DC Comics	Victor Fries has to wear a prosthetic suit for life support due to his condition, which only allows him to survive in very cold temperatures.	
1963	Professor X	X-Men	Marvel Comics	Wheelchair user	
1963	Doctor Strange	Avengers, Defenders, Illuminati, Infinity Watch, Midnight Sons, New Avengers, The Order	Marvel Comics	Nerve damage in his hands that limits his ability to perform surgeries. Loss of fine motor control.	
1963	Nick Fury	Sgt. Fury and his Howling Commandos, Avengers	Marvel Comics	Fury is missing his left eye.	
1964	Daredevil	Daredevil	Marvel Comics	Blind	
1967	Barbara Gordon	Detective Comics, Batman	DC Comics	Became paraplegic after being shot by the Joker in the 1988 graphic novel Batman: The Killing Joke. Though Gordon's mobility was eventually restored, her paralysis has been the subject of much critical commentary for and against restoring her mobility.	(Note: In The Batman 2004 Series It is shown in the Season 4 Episode "Artifacts" that she has become paralyzed and is using a tech mechanical wheelchair in the future. But how she got paralyzed remains a mystery.) (Note: In the Arkham series and Gotham Knights she is shot by Joker and became paralyzed in both game series. But in the 2011-present comic series, in Gotham Knights, she has a neural implant in her spine, making her able to walk again, to some controversy regarding the decision in that game.)
1976	Wendy Harris	Teen Titans, Batgirl	DC Comics	Paraplegia and wheelchair user (New Earth 1986-2011 universe.)	(Note: Oracle: The Cure (2009) #1-#3)
1980	Cyborg	Teen Titans	DC Comics	Victor Stone lost his left eye and uses of cybernetic prosthetics after losing large sections of his body in a catastrophic accident.	
1980	Deathstroke	Teen Titans	DC Comics	Slade Wilson wears an eyepatch over his right eye, which was shot out by his ex-wife Adeline.	
1983	Jason Todd	Detective Comics, Batman	DC Comics	Jason has psychological trauma after being tortured and killed by the Joker, coming back to life, and among other bad things that happen to him.	
1984	Jericho	Teen Titans	DC Comics	Jericho is mute due to throat injuries he sustained as a child and primarily communicates via American Sign Language.	
1985	Black Mask	Detective Comics, Batman	DC Comics	Roman Sionis sustained physical and mental childhood trauma, caused in part by a mental injury he received as an infant.	(Note: Batman (1940) #565 and Detective Comics (1937) #732)
1991	Hotaru Tomoe/Sailor Saturn	Sailor Moon	Naoko Takeuchi	Hotaru has mysterious seizures due to being the host of the Daimon Mistress 9.	
1992	Rose Wilson	Teen Titans	DC Comics	Rose Wilson stabbed her left eye out in a bid to emulate her father, Deathstroke. In later relaunches, Wilson's eye was restored.	
1992	Stephanie Brown	Detective Comics, Batman	DC Comics	Stephanie has post-traumatic stress disorder due to have survived severe abuse from her criminal father (Cluemaster), a difficult childhood with a mother struggling with addiction, and a notorious storyline (Batman: War Games) where she was captured, brutally tortured by the villain Black Mask, and presumed dead.	
1995	Charmy Bee	Sonic the Hedgehog Archie Comic Series	Archie Comics	In the Archie continuity, Charmy sustained a brain injury which caused him to believe that he is younger than his actual age. This has been a subject of controversy for its mean spiritedness and for being used as a way for humor.	
1997 (Note: first appeared in Batman the Animated Series in 1992.)	Nora Fries	Detective Comics, Batman	DC Comics	Nora was placed in cryogenic stasis due to an unspecified medical condition.	
1999	Cassandra Cain	Detective Comics, Batman	DC Comics	Cassandra has language disorder/dyslexia, as she struggles to communicate normally due to her parents focusing on making her a weapon above anything else.	(Note: Batgirl (2000) #1, #4, 67#)
2001	Izumi Curtis	Fullmetal Alchemist	Hiromu Arakawa	Izumi has a chronic illness due to missing organs.	
2001	Edward Elric	Fullmetal Alchemist	Hiromu Arakawa	Edward is a double amputee, having lost his left leg and right arm in separate incidents.	
2003	Rick Grimes	The Walking Dead	Robert Kirkman	Gets his right hand cut off by The Governor.	
2003	Carl Grimes	The Walking Dead	Robert Kirkman	Gets his right eye shot off.	
2003	Dale Horvath	The Walking Dead	Robert Kirkman	Gets his right foot cut off in order to not become a Walker.	
2004	Celty Sturluson	Durarara!!	Ryohgo Narita	Mute and communicates with a personal digital assistant.	
2004	Johnny Joestar	JoJo's Bizarre Adventure	Hirohiko Araki	Paraplegic and wheelchair user after being shot in the back.	
2006	The Governor	The Walking Dead	Robert Kirkman	Gets his left eye stabbed out, loses his right arm and both legs by Michonne Hawthorne.	
2009	Homestuck trolls	Homestuck	Andrew Hussie	Many protagonists have disabilities, mostly from battle. Notably, Tavros Nitram has lower-body paralysis, Meulin Leijon is deaf, Terezi Pyrope is blind and synesthesic, and Mituna Captor has brain damage.	
2013	Jessica Cruz	Green Lantern	DC Comics	Post-traumatic stress disorder and social anxiety disorder	
2014	Connie	The Walking Dead	Robert Kirkman	Cut off her left hand, so she would not turn into a Walker.	(Note: The Walking Dead (2003) #161)

== Video games ==
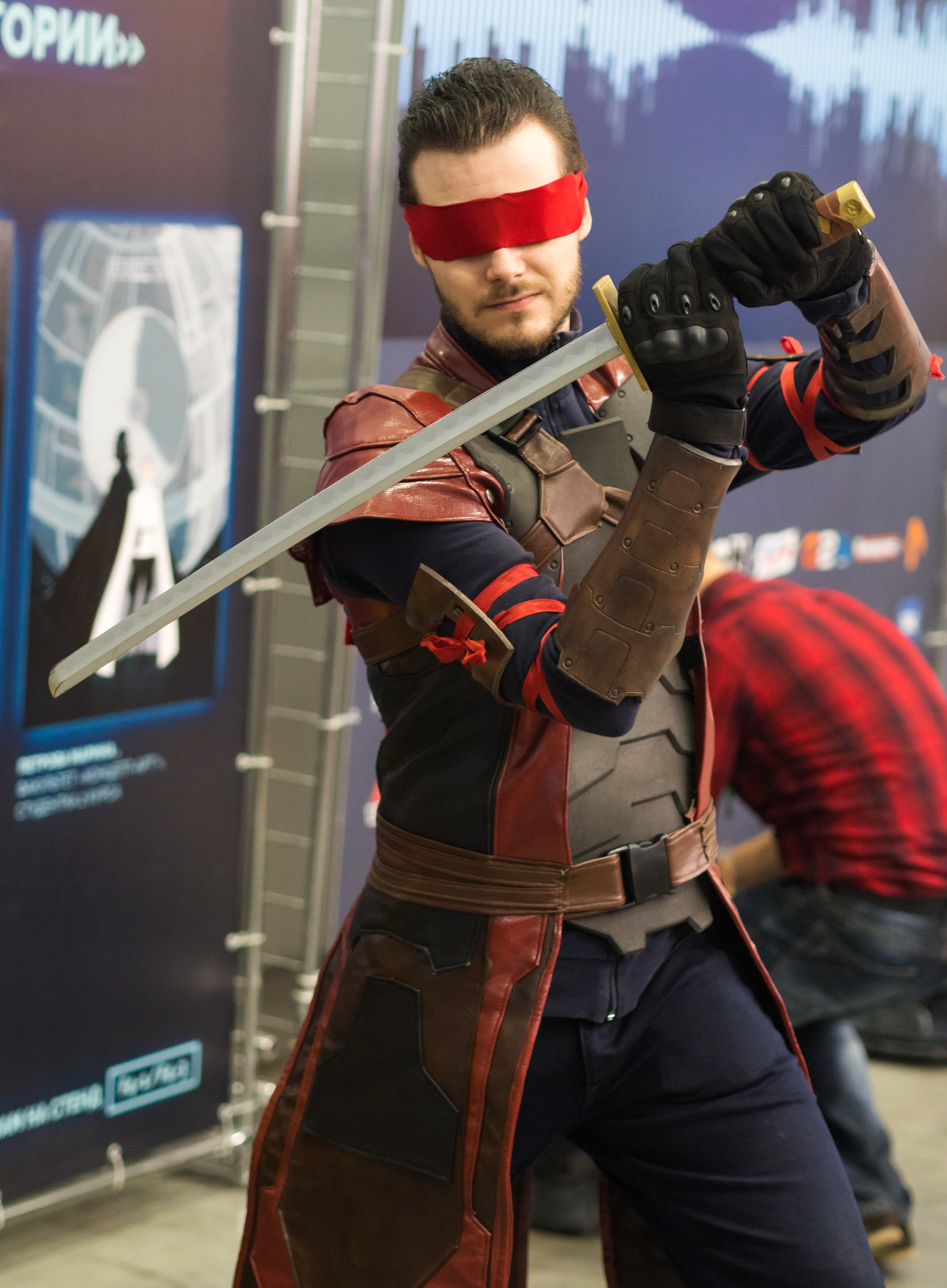
A promotional model depicting Kenshi Takahashi, a blind character from Mortal Kombat

First year	Character(s)	Actor(s) (Note: Actors described will only apply to those who voiced or provided motion acting for the video game versions, not any film or television depictions.)	Game/Series	Disability	Ref.
1986	Samus Aran	Jennifer Hale, Vanessa Marshall, Alésia Glidewell, Jessica Erin Martin, among others	Metroid	Post-traumatic stress disorder	
1990	Big Boss	David Hayter and Akio Otsuka, among others	Metal Gear	Has a missing eye and wears an eyepatch	
1993	Jax	Ed Boon, among others	Metal Gear	Has two bionic prosthetic arms	
1995	Jan Ors	Julie Eccles, Angela Harry, and Vanessa Marshall	Star Wars: Jedi Knight	Between Dark Forces and Jedi Knight: Dark Forces II, she lost her right hand and got a mechanical prosthetic hand.	
1995	Rayman	Steven Perkinson, Pierre-Alain de Garrigues (fr), David Gasman, Emmanuel Garijo (fr) among others.	Rayman	In Rayman 3: Hoodlum Havoc and Rayman Raving Rabbids, Rayman loses his hands in the beginning of both games and has to get them back.	
1996	Chris Redfield	Joe Whyte, Kevin Dorman, Roger Craig Smith, Hiroki Tōchi, among others.	Resident Evil	Post-traumatic stress disorder shown in Resident Evil 5, RE5's promotional material, and Resident Evil 6.	(Note: Chris in Resident Evil 5 is forced to face his past, along with getting a new partner Sheva Alomar after what happened to Jill Valentine.)
1997	Cloud Strife	Steve Burton, Takahiro Sakurai, Cody Christian, among others	Final Fantasy VII	Dissociative identity disorder and post-traumatic stress disorder	
1997	Barret Wallace	Beau Billingslea, John Eric Bentley, Masahiro Kobayashi, Masato Funaki, among others	Final Fantasy VII	Has his missing right hand replaced with a gatling gun called a "Gimmick Arm"	
1997	Tifa Lockhart	Rachael Leigh Cook, Britt Baron, Ayumi Ito, among others	Final Fantasy VII	Psychological trauma	
1997	Wolf O'Donnell	Jock Blaney, Hisao Egawa, Grant Goodeve, Jay Ward, Mahito Ohba, and Samuel Drake, among others	Star Fox	Lost his left eye and wears an eye patch.	
1998	Leon S. Kennedy	Paul Haddad, Paul Mercier, Matthew Mercer, Nick Apostolides, Jin Yamanoi, Toshiyuki Morikawa, among others	Resident Evil	Post-traumatic stress disorder shown in Resident Evil 6, Resident Evil 4 (2023), and Resident Evil Requiem.	(Note: One of the files in Residnet Evil 6, reveals that Leon nearly committed suicide during to the events of Raccoon City due to the trauma.)
1998	Revolver Ocelot	Patric Zimmerman and Kōji Totani, among others	Metal Gear	Had a missing arm replaced with a transplant from Liquid Snake	
1999	Squall Leonhart	David Boreanaz, Doug Erholtz, and Hideo Ishikawa	Final Fantasy VIII	Psychological trauma and post-traumatic stress disorder	
1999	Rinoa Heartilly	Skyler Davenport and Kana Hanazawa	Final Fantasy VIII	Psychological trauma	
1999	Selphie Tilmitt	Molly Marlette and Mayuko Aoki	Final Fantasy VIII	Psychological trauma	(Note: Selphie uses an energetic, bubbly, and overly cheerful personality as a psychological defense mechanism or "mask" to cope with deep grief, trauma, and the horrors of war.)
2000	Alice Liddell	Susie Brann	American McGee's Alice and Alice: Madness Returns	Psychosis	
2001	Maria Robotnik	Moriah Angeline, Rebecca Honig, Stephanie Sheh, Yuri Shiratori, among others.	Sonic Adventure 2, Shadow the Hedgehog, and Shadow Generations	While her disease neuro-immuno deficiency syndrome is fictional, it shares many similarities to real life ones like Common variable immunodeficiency and Dysautonomia.	
2001	James Sunderland	Guy Cihi, Luke Roberts, and Chikahiro Kobayashi	Silent Hill 2	Obsessive–compulsive disorder and post-traumatic stress disorder	
2001	Mary Shepherd-Sunderland	Monica Taylor Horgan, Salóme Gunnarsdóttir, and Shizuka Itō	Silent Hill 2	An unknown illness	
2001	Angela Orosco	Donna Burke, Gianna Kiehl, and Risa Shimizu	Silent Hill 2	Psychological trauma	
2001	Eddie Dombrowski	David Schaufele, Danny Kirrane, Scott Haining, and Tōru Nara	Silent Hill 2	Body dysmorphic disorder and psychological trauma	
2001	Raiden	Quinton Flynn and Kenyu Horiuchi	Metal Gear	Had much of his body destroyed and replaced with cybernetics	
2001	Miles Edgeworth	Seon King, Mark Healy, Kyle Hebert, among others.	Ace Attorney	Psychological trauma and post-traumatic stress disorder	
2002	Kenshi Takahashi	Noah Fleder	Mortal Kombat	Blind	
2003	Darth Malak	Rafael Ferrer	Star Wars: Knights of the Old Republic	Lost his lower jaw during a lightsaber duel against his master, Darth Revan, during the Jedi Civil War. After the injury, Malak wore a large metal lower-jaw prosthesis. He used a vocabulator to speak.	
2004	The Jedi Exile/Meetra Surik	Salli Saffioti	Star Wars Knights of the Old Republic II: The Sith Lords	Post-traumatic stress disorder and psychological trauma	
2004	Kreia	Sara Kestelman	Star Wars Knights of the Old Republic II: The Sith Lords	Blind and cybernetic/hidden prosthetic right arm.	(Note: Exile: What's wrong with your eyes? / Kreia: There is nothing wrong with my sight, if that is your question. I see all that I need, though the seeing of things flesh and blood has failed me some time ago. They were distractions only. / Exile: There might be a way to heal your sight. / Kreia: There is nothing wrong with my eyes - they have simply atrophied from use. They are adequate to distinguish shapes, silhouettes. If need be, I could heal them, restore my sight, but sight can prove a distraction. When one relies on sight to perceive the world, it is like trying to stare at the galaxy through a crack in the door. But that is a lesson for another time. You must learn to see crude matter for what it is before the veil is lifted.)
2004	Atton Rand	Nicky Katt	Star Wars Knights of the Old Republic II: The Sith Lords	Post-traumatic stress disorder	
2004	Visas Marr	Kelly Hu	Star Wars Knights of the Old Republic II: The Sith Lords	Blind	
2004	Bao-Dur	Roger Guenveur Smith	Star Wars Knights of the Old Republic II: The Sith Lords	Lost his left arm due to the Mandalorian Wars, but creates a mechanical replacement.	
2004	Darth Nihilus	—N/a	Star Wars Knights of the Old Republic II: The Sith Lords	Mute	
2004	Darth Sion	Louis Mellis	Star Wars Knights of the Old Republic II: The Sith Lords	Heavily disfigured only hold on together by his rage and hatred.	
2005	Goro Majima	Hidenari Ugaki, Mark Hamill, and Matthew Mercer	Yakuza	Has a missing eye and wears an eyepatch	
2006	Vaan	Bobby Edner, Kouhei Takeda, and Kensho Ono	Final Fantasy XII	Psychological trauma	
2006	Ashelia "Ashe" B'nargin Dalmasca	Kari Wahlgren and Mie Sonozaki	Final Fantasy XII	Psychological trauma	
2006	Midna	Akiko Kōmoto	The Legend of Zelda: Twilight Princess	Psychological trauma	(Note: Midna's trauma centers on Zant's betrayal, her forced transformation into an imp, exile from the Twilight Realm, and near-fatal injury from overexposure to light.)
2007	Jeff "Joker" Moreau	Seth Green	Mass Effect	Brittle bone disease	
2007	Tali'Zorah	Ash Sroka	Mass Effect	Tali's species, the Quarians, have a weak immune system, and even a small scratch in her armor could cause a deadly infection to occur. She must wear a sealed bio-suit at all times to prevent fatal infections.	
2007	Big Daddy	Stephen Stanton	BioShock	The Big Daddies have their Vocal cords cut, making most of them mute.	
2007	Tavish "Demoman" Finnegan DeGroot	Gary Schwartz	Team Fortress 2	Tavish lost his eye at age seven after the magician Marasum took it because a magical book called the Bombinomicon possessed Tavish's eye. As an adult, he wears an eyepatch.	
2007	Chell	Alésia Glidewell	Portal	Mute	
2008	Nero	Johnny Yong Bosch and Kaito Ishikawa	Devil May Cry	Has a prosthetic arm called the Devil Bringer	
2008	Rahm Kota	Cully Fredricksen	Star Wars: The Force Unleashed	Rahm loses his eyesight during a duel against Darth Vader's secret apprentice, Starkiller (Galen Marek).	
2008	Isaac Clarke	Gunner Wright	Dead Space	Isaac developed Post-traumatic stress disorder after the events of the first game and his girlfriend Nicole Brennan's death; this led to him also having psychosis.	(Note: Dead Space 2 shows all of this through its story and is a large theme in it as well.)
2009	Sheva Alomar	Karen Dyer	Resident Evil 5	Sheva has psychological trauma after being the only survivor of a massacre caused by Umbrella Corporation so that no one would know about an outbreak that had just happened.	(Note: Resident Evil 5 (2009), file: "Sheva Alomar".) (Note: Sheva is also forced to face her past when she returns to her home area of Kijuju, where Chris Redfield helps her as her partner.)
2010	Thane Krios	Keythe Farley	Mass Effect	Kessler syndrome, a fatal, degenerative lung disease (analogous to cystic fibrosis) that progressively impairs oxygen absorption.	
2010	Johnny Topside/Subject Delta	Stephen Stanton	BioShock 2	Johnny Topside aka Subject Delta and other Alpha series Big Daddies' hearts can stop if their Little Sisters die, are rescued, or they are away from them for too long.	
2010	Eleanor Lamb	Sydney Unseth (child) Sarah Bolger (teenager)	BioShock 2	Psychological trauma	(Note: Eleanor's trauma comes from extreme emotional, psychological, and physical abuse at the hands of her mother, Dr. Sofia Lamb)
2010	Big Sisters	Jodelle Ferland	BioShock 2	Psychological trauma	(Note: All of the Big Sisters are former Little Sisters, and when their Little Sister physical and mental conditioning was broken, Many of them experienced psychological trauma after seeing what Rapture was really like.)
2010	Splicers	Numerous people	BioShock 2	Many of the Splicers have severely deformed, scarred, and misshapen faces.	
2010	Shulk	Adam Howden and Shintarō Asanuma	Xenoblade Chronicles and Xenoblade Chronicles 3 Future Redeemed	Has a prosthetic right arm.	
2010	Joshua Graham	Keith Szarabajka	Fallout: New Vegas	Total body surface area and chronic pain	
2011	Adam Jensen	Elias Toufexis	Deus Ex	Left critically disabled and crippled after an attack on Sarif Industries at the start of Deus Ex: Human Revolution, leading him to be non-consensually fitted with full-body mechanical augmentations to save his life.	
2011	Hammer	Fred Tatasciore	Batman: Arkham City	Hammer and Sickle are conjoined twins; they were later removed from each other by surgery done by Hush, for Joker to take Hammer alone, leading to Penguin to take in Sickle.	(Note: In the tie-in Arkham Knight comics, Hammer and Sickle were put back together by Scarecrow, however the Arkham Knight comic series has been heavily retconned by both Batman: Arkham Knight and Suicide Squad: Kill the Justice League making any of its events unlikely to still be canon to the series at large.)
2011	Sickle	Steve Blum	Batman: Arkham City	Hammer and Sickle are conjoined twins; they were later removed from each other by surgery done by Hush, for Joker to take Hammer alone, leading to Penguin to take in Sickle.	(Note: In the tie-in Arkham Knight comics, Hammer and Sickle were put back together by Scarecrow, however the Arkham Knight comic series has been heavily retconned by both Batman: Arkham Knight and Suicide Squad: Kill the Justice League making any of its events unlikely to still be canon to the series at large.)
2012	Hisao Nakai	—N/a	Katawa Shoujo	Heart failure and illness	
2012	Emi Ibarazaki	—N/a	Katawa Shoujo	Amputee of both feet after a car crash 8 years before the game's events.	
2012	Hanako Ikezawa	—N/a	Katawa Shoujo	Post-traumatic stress disorder, psychological trauma, and social anxiety disorder after surviving a house fire. Hanako also has lots of burn scars/Total body surface area on the right side of her body.	
2012	Lilly Satou	—N/a	Katawa Shoujo	Blindness and uses a traditional white cane to navigate her surroundings.	
2012	Rin Tezuka	—N/a	Katawa Shoujo	Born without arms	
2012	Shizune Hakamichi	—N/a	Katawa Shoujo	Deafness and mute, Shizune is able to communicate through sign language.	
2012	Kenji Setou	—N/a	Katawa Shoujo	Blindness	
2012	Miki Miura	—N/a	Katawa Shoujo	Amputee with her left hand	
2012	Lee Everett	Dave Fennoy	The Walking Dead	Lee can cut off his left hand to try to stop the walker infection from spreading.	
2012	Clementine	Melissa Hutchison	The Walking Dead	Amputee	
2013	Booker DeWitt	Troy Baker	BioShock Infinite	Post-traumatic stress disorder and major depressive disorder	
2013	Elizabeth Comstock (Anna DeWitt)	Courtnee Draper	BioShock Infinite	Wears Thimble for her right pinky after losing it in another universe.	
2013	Cornelius Slate	Keith Szarabajka	BioShock Infinite	Wears an eye patch over his left eye.	
2013	Joel Miller	Troy Baker	The Last of Us	Joel has post-traumatic stress disorder after the death of his daughter Sarah.	
2013	Ellie Williams	Ashley Johnson	The Last of Us	Ellie has post-traumatic stress disorder due to the deaths of Riley and later Joel, which becomes a lot worse for her. She also lost two of her fingers on her left hand after Abigail "Abby" Anderson bit them off in a fight.	
2013	Zero	Tara Platt and Maaya Uchida	Drakengard 3	Has a prosthetic arm	
2013	Bane	Fred Tatasciore and JB Blanc	Batman: Arkham Origins	Bane injects himself with TN-1 (the original version of Titan that would be used in Arkham Asylum) to have a final shot at killing Batman, this would fail and Bane suffers a brain injury, causing him to forget Batman's secret identity and making him more brutish.	
2015	Maxine "Max" Caulfield	Hannah Telle	Life Is Strange	Unknown disability	(Note: In Episode 3, you can find a file on Max that reveals that she's part of an Individualized Education Program and has a disability. The disability is unknown.)
2015	Scarecrow	Dino Andrade, John Noble, and Elijah Wood	Batman: Arkham Knight	Jonathan Crane aka Scarecrow, was attacked by Killer Croc when he tried to put fear toxin in his water area to spread it to the rest of Gotham City in Arkham Asylum. He would become disfigured as a result, losing much of his teeth.	
2015	Venom Snake	Kiefer Sutherland	Metal Gear	Has a missing eye and arm, wears an eyepatch and prosthetic limb.	
2016	Ignis Scientia	Adam Croasdell and Mamoru Miyano, among others	Final Fantasy XV	Blindness loses his eye sight.	
2016	Ravus Nox Fleuret	Trevor Devall and Yuichi Nakamura, among others	Final Fantasy XV	Has a prosthetic left arm.	
2016	Cassidy	Matthew Mercer	Overwatch	Has a cybernetic prosthetic arm	
2016	Symmetra	Anjali Bhimani	Overwatch	Has a cybernetic prosthetic arm	
2016	Junkrat	Chris Parson	Overwatch	Has a prosthetic right leg	
2017	Doomfist	Sahr Ngaujah	Overwatch	Has a cybernetic prosthetic arm	
2017	Ethan Winters	Todd Soley, Hidenobu Kiuchi, among others	Resident Evil 7: Biohazard and Resident Evil Village	Ethan loses his left hand by Mia Winters when she was infected and mentally controlled by Eveline's mold, but Zoe Baker helps reattached it. Ethan can lose his right leg if the player chooses to open the hatch. He loses two of his left hand fingers to a Vârcolac and his right hand to Alcina Dimitrescu, but is able to put his right hand back together.	
2017	Princess Zelda	Patricia Summersett, Yū Shimamura, among others	The Legend of Zelda: Breath of the Wild and The Legend of Zelda: Tears of the Kingdom	Psychological trauma	(Note: Zelda's trauma comes from her huge struggle to awaken her powers in time as everyone is counting on her and after losing her father, the champions, and her kingdom, she begins blaming herself for failing to awaken her powers sooner, in her diary, she mentions this a handful of times as well.)
2017	Pyra	Skye Bennett and Shino Shimoji	Xenoblade Chronicles 2	Dissociative identity disorder	(Note: Mythra formed Pyra after the loss of Milton and due to the many deaths she caused during her battle with Malos. This is shown in Xenoblade Chronicles 2's main story and Torna's main story.)
2017	Mythra	Skye Bennett and Shino Shimoji	Xenoblade Chronicles 2	Dissociative identity disorder	(Note: Mythra formed Pyra after the loss of Milton and due to the many deaths she caused during her battle with Malos. This is shown in Xenoblade Chronicles 2's main story and Torna's main story.)
2017	Senua	Melina Juergens	Hellblade: Senua's Sacrifice	Severe psychosis	
2018	Madeline	—N/a	Celeste	Depression and panic attacks	
2019	Cal Kestis	Cameron Monaghan	Star Wars Jedi: Fallen Order	Post-traumatic stress disorder after surviving Order 66 and seeing his master die in front of him. He later gets psychological trauma in Star Wars Jedi: Survivor.	
2019	Bernadetta von Varley	Erica Mendez and Ayumi Tsuji	Fire Emblem: Three Houses	Psychological trauma and social anxiety disorder.	
2019	Dimitri Alexandre Blaiddyd	Chris Hackney and Kaito Ishikawa	Fire Emblem: Three Houses	Post-traumatic stress disorder and wears an eye patch for his right eye in most routes.	
2019	Edelgard von Hresvelg	Tara Platt and Ai Kakuma	Fire Emblem: Three Houses	Frailty syndrome and post-traumatic stress disorder	
2019	Lysithea von Ordelia	Janice Kawaye and Aoi Yūki	Fire Emblem: Three Houses	Frailty syndrome	
2019	Marianne von Edmund	Xanthe Huynh and Sawako Hata	Fire Emblem: Three Houses	Depression and social anxiety disorder	
2020	Yara	Victoria Grace	The Last of Us Part II	Amputee	
2022	Collei	Christina Costello and Qin Wenjing, among others.	Genshin Impact	Collei has Eleazar, a fictional disease which causes scales to appear on the skin. It has been compared by sources to Guillain–Barré syndrome and POEMS syndrome. Her Eleazar is cured in the game's story.	
2022	Malenia	Pippa Bennett-Warner	Elden Ring	Blind, lost her right arm, left leg, and half of her right leg. Has prosthetics for them.	
2023	Link	Kengo Takanashi	The Legend of Zelda: Tears of the Kingdom	Link has an injured right arm, which was replaced with a magical prosthesis. At the end of the game, Link is healed and the prothesis disappears.	
2026	Grace Ashcroft	Angela Sant'Albano and Shihori Kanjiya, among others.	Resident Evil Requiem	Psychological trauma and stuttering.	
2026	Theodora	Shara Kirby and Minami Takayama	Fire Emblem: Fortune's Weave	Theodora loses her right arm in an attack. She later gets a prosthetic arm.	

== Mascots ==
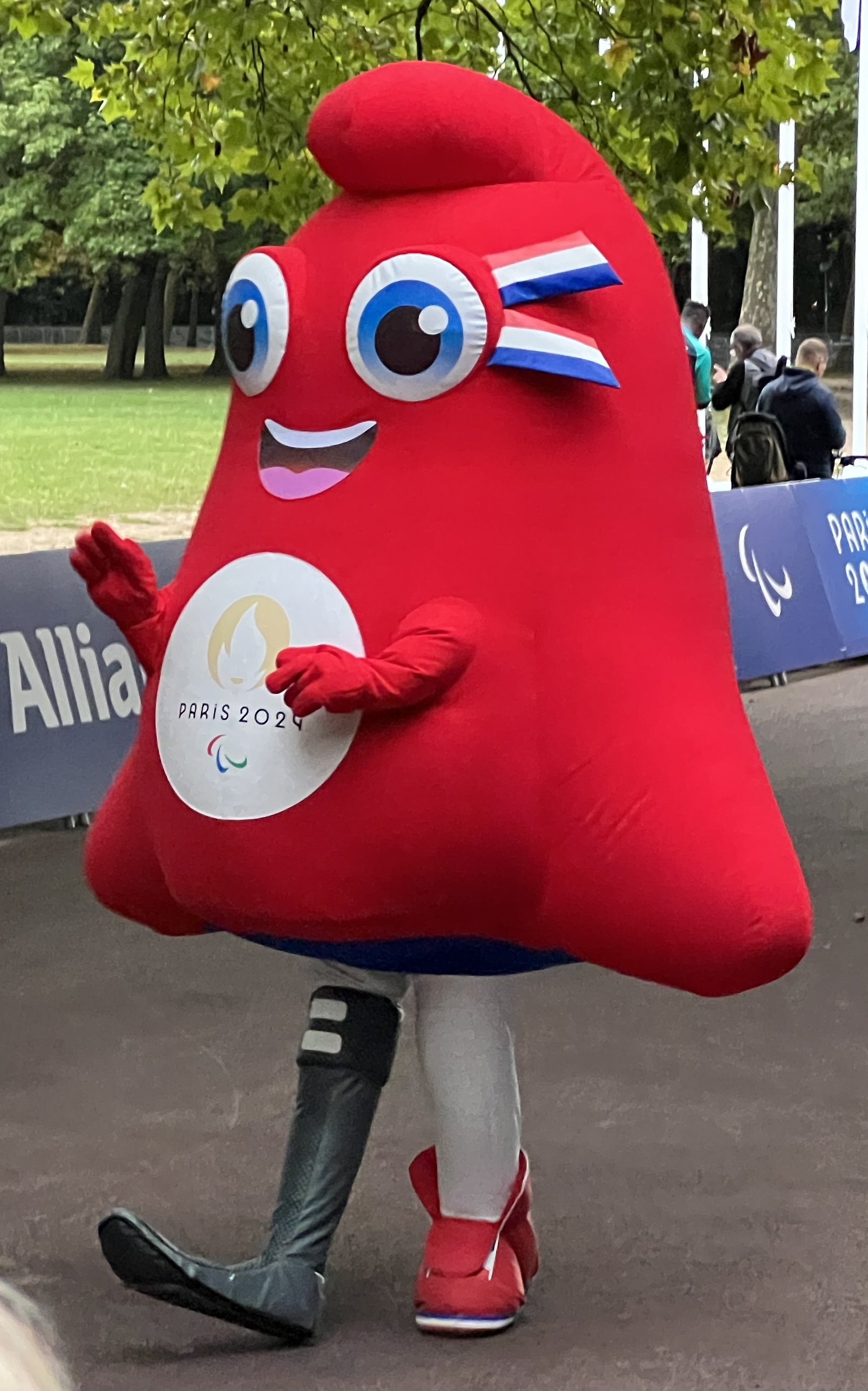
The Paralympic Phryge, the mascot of the 2024 Summer Paralympics, has a prosthetic leg

Year	Character	Origin	Creator	Disability	Ref.
1992	Petra	1992 Summer Paralympics	Javier Mariscal	Missing arms	
1994	Sondre	1994 Winter Paralympics	Tor Lindrupsen and Janne Solem	Missing leg	
2024	Paralympic Phryge	2024 Summer Paralympics	Gilles Deleris	Missing leg, wears a prosthesis	
2026	Milo	2026 Winter Paralympics	Istituto Comprensivo Taverna	Missing leg	

== See also ==
- Cripping-up – Casting a non-disabled actor in a disabled role
- List of fictional characters with bipolar disorder
- List of blind people#Fictional
- Disability in the arts
- Disability in the media
- Disability culture – Culture of people with disabilities
- Theatre and disability – Representation and portrayal of disability in theatre
