= List of fictional characters with disabilities in comics, manga, and manhwa =

Wikimedia list article

Fictional characters with disabilities that appear in comics, manga, and manhwa. A disability may be readily visible or invisible in nature. Some examples of invisible disabilities include intellectual disabilities, autism spectrum disorder, attention deficit hyperactivity disorder, mental disorders, asthma, epilepsy, allergies, migraines, arthritis, and chronic fatigue syndrome.

== Comics, manga, and manhwa ==
First year	Character	Series/Franchise	Author/Publisher	Disability	Ref.
1939	Batman	Detective Comics, Batman	DC Comics	Bruce has post-traumatic stress disorder due to the death of his parents and many other events like the death of Jason Todd.	
1941	Wonder Woman	Absolute Universe	DC Comics	In the Absolute Universe, Wonder Woman sacrifices her right arm to return Steve Trevor to Earth. She has a mechanical prosthetic arm for a bit until her arm is regrown.	(Note: Absolute Wonder Woman (2024) #3)
1941	Aquaman	Aquaman comics	DC Comics	In various continuities, Aquaman uses a harpoon hook as a hand prosthesis.	
1941	Penguin	Detective Comics, Batman	DC Comics	The Penguin has dwarfism. In some continuities, he is depicted with flipper-like hands.	
1942	Two-Face	Detective Comics, Batman	DC Comics	Dissociative identity disorder and burn injuries.	
1943	Cheetah	Wonder Woman	DC Comics	Dissociative identity disorder for the Priscilla Rich version.	
1948	Riddler	Detective Comics, Batman	DC Comics	Obsessive–compulsive disorder	
1952	Firefly	Detective Comics, Batman	DC Comics	Firefly has burn scars on most of his body.	(Note: Detective Comics (1937) #727)
1958	Garth Ranzz (Lightning Lad)	Legion of Super-Heroes	DC Comics	In the Legion's original continuity and the 1994 reboot, Ranzz lost his right arm in battle and was given a prosthetic. In later continuities, Ranzz's arm is left intact.	
1959	Kara Zor-El	Action Comics, Superman	DC Comics	Psychological trauma and depression	
1959	Mr. Freeze	Detective Comics, Batman	DC Comics	Victor Fries suffered an accident that rendered him only able to survive in very cold temperatures, forcing him to wear a prosthetic suit for life support.	
1963	Professor X	X-Men	Marvel Comics	Wheelchair user.	
1963	Dr Strange	Avengers, Defenders, Illuminati, Infinity Watch, Midnight Sons, New Avengers, The Order	Marvel Comics	Nerve damage in his hands that limits his ability to perform surgeries. Loss of fine motor control.	
1963	Nick Fury	Sgt. Fury and his Howling Commandos, Avengers	Marvel Comics	Fury is missing his left eye.	
1964	Daredevil	Daredevil	Marvel Comics	Blind	
1967	Barbara Gordon	Detective Comics, Batman	DC Comics	Became paraplegic after being shot by the Joker in the 1988 graphic novel Batman: The Killing Joke. In current continuity, Gordon was cured of her paralysis after receiving a cybernetic implant. The character's paralysis has been the subject of much critical commentary for and against restoring her mobility.	
1976	Wendy Harris	Teen Titans, Batgirl	DC Comics	Paraplegia and wheelchair user (New Earth 1986-2011 universe.)	(Note: Oracle: The Cure (2009) #1-#3)
1980	Cyborg	Teen Titans	DC Comics	Victor Stone lost his left eye and uses of cybernetic prosthetics after losing large sections of his body in a catastrophic accident.	
1980	Slade Wilson	Teen Titans	DC Comics	Slade wears an eyepatch over his right eye, which was shot out by his wife Adeline.	
1983	Jason Todd	Detective Comics, Batman	DC Comics	Jason has Psychological trauma after being tortured and killed by the Joker, then resurrected.	
1984	Kumiko "Josee" Yamamura	Josee, the Tiger and the Fish	Seiko Tanabe	Paralyzed	
1984	Jericho	Teen Titans	DC Comics	Jericho is mute due to throat injuries he sustained as a child and primarily communicates with American Sign Language.	
1985	Black Mask	Detective Comics, Batman	DC Comics	Roman Sionis sustained physical and mental childhood trauma, caused in part by a mental injury he received as an infant.	(Note: Batman (1940) #565 and Detective Comics (1937) #732)
1987	Cheetah	Wonder Woman	DC Comics	The Barbara Minerva version of Cheetah was mystically empowered by the god Urzkartaga, but was cursed due to not being a virgin. As a result, she is crippled in her human form and uses a cane for mobility.	
1991	Hotaru Tomoe/Sailor Saturn	Sailor Moon	Naoko Takeuchi	Hotaru has mysterious seizures due to being the host of the Daimon Mistress 9.	
1992	Rose Wilson	Teen Titans	DC Comics	Wilson stabbed her left eye out in a bid to emulate her father, Deathstroke. In later relaunches, Wilson's eye was restored.	
1992	Stephanie Brown	Detective Comics, Batman	DC Comics	Stephanie has Post-traumatic stress disorder due to have survived severe abuse from her criminal father (Cluemaster), a difficult childhood with a mother struggling with addiction, and a notorious storyline (Batman: War Games) where she was captured and brutally tortured by the villain Black Mask.	
1995	Charmy Bee	Sonic the Hedgehog Archie Comic Series	Archie Comics	In the Archie universe, Charmy sustained a brain injury which caused him to believe that he is younger than his actual age. This has been a subject of controversy for its mean spiritedness and for being used as a way for humor.	
1997 (Note: first appeared in Batman the Animated Series in 1992.)	Nora Fries	Detective Comics, Batman	DC Comics	Nora is put in a cryogenic tank due to a Disease/Illness she has.	
1999	Cassandra Cain	Detective Comics, Batman	DC Comics	Cain has Language disorder/Dyslexia, as she struggles to communicate normally due to her parents focusing on making her a weapon above anything else.	(Note: Batgirl (2000) #1, #4, 67#)
1999	Kiyoharu Togawa	Real	Shueisha	Wheelchair user	
1999	Hisanobu Takahashi	Real	Shueisha	Paralyzed	
1999	Yamashita Yasumi	Real	Shueisha	Paralyzed	
2001	Izumi Curtis	Fullmetal Alchemist	Hiromu Arakawa	Izumi has a chronic illness due to missing organs.	
2001	Edward Elric	Fullmetal Alchemist	Hiromu Arakawa	Edward is a double amputee, having lost his left leg and right arm in separate incidents.	
2003	Rick Grimes	The Walking Dead	Robert Kirkman	Gets his right hand cut off by The Governor.	
2003	Carl Grimes	The Walking Dead	Robert Kirkman	Gets his right eye shot off.	
2003	Dale Horvath	The Walking Dead	Robert Kirkman	Gets his right foot cut off in order to not become a Walker.	
2004	Celty Sturluson	Durarara!!	Ryohgo Narita	Mute and communicates with a personal digital assistant.	
2004	Johnny Joestar	JoJo's Bizarre Adventure	Hirohiko Araki	Paraplegic and wheelchair user after being shot in the back.	
2004	Noise Marie	D.Gray-man	Shueisha	Blind	
2004	Lavi Bookman	D.Gray-man	Shueisha	Wears an eye patch over his right eye.	
2005	Takuma Kakinouchi	I Give My First Love to You	Shogakukan	Heart condition	
2006	Brian Blake	The Walking Dead	Robert Kirkman	Brian gets his left eye stabbed out, loses his right arm and both legs to Michonne Hawthorne.	
2007	Davie Falkner	Friday the 13th	WildStorm	Davie was born with craniodiaphyseal dysplasia.	(Note: Friday the 13th: How I Spent My Summer Vacation (2007) #1 and #2)
2008	Holman Hunt	Batman	DC Comics	Total body surface area	(Note: Joker's Asylum: Two-Face #1 ("Two-Face, Too!") (2008))
2009	Homestuck trolls	Homestuck	Andrew Hussie	Many protagonists have disabilities, mostly from battle. Notably, Tavros Nitram has lower-body paralysis, Meulin Leijon is deaf, Terezi Pyrope is blind and synesthesic, and Mituna Captor has brain damage.	
2011	Nicolas Brown	Gangsta	Shinchosha	Hearing loss	
2011	Kaori Miyazono	Your Lie in April	Kodansha	An unknown illness	
2013	Jessica Cruz	Green Lantern	DC Comics	Post-traumatic stress disorder and social anxiety disorder	
2013	Kohei Sugihara	I Hear the Sunspot	Yuki Fumino	Hearing loss	
2013	Shōko Nishimiya	A Silent Voice	Kodansha	Prelingual deafness	
2013	Hock Malsuum	Star Wars	Dark Horse Comics	Hock deals with post-traumatic stress disorder after the events of the comic.	(Note: Star Wars: Darth Vader and the Cry of Shadows (2013) #5)
2014	Connie	The Walking Dead	Robert Kirkman	Cut off her left hand, so she would not turn into a Walker.	(Note: The Walking Dead (2003) #161)
2019	Emma	Veil	Ikumi Fukuda	Blind	
2023	Chloe Verdier	Betrayal of Dignity	KIMPA	Physical disability and Chronic condition	

== See also ==
- Cripping-up – Casting a non-disabled actor in a disabled role
- List of autistic fictional characters
- List of fictional characters with disabilities
- List of fictional characters with bipolar disorder
- List of blind people#Fictional
- Disability in the arts
- Disability in the media
- Disability culture – Culture of people with disabilities
- Theatre and disability – Representation and portrayal of disability in theatre
