= JIW =

JIW may refer to:

- Jane's Infantry Weapons, a publication of Jane's Information Group
- J. I. Wedgwood (1883–1951), the first Presiding Bishop of the Liberal Catholic Church
- Jiwani Airport, in Balochistan, Pakistan
- JIW, a case study of lexical-gustatory synesthesia
