= James Wannerton =

English man known for synesthesia

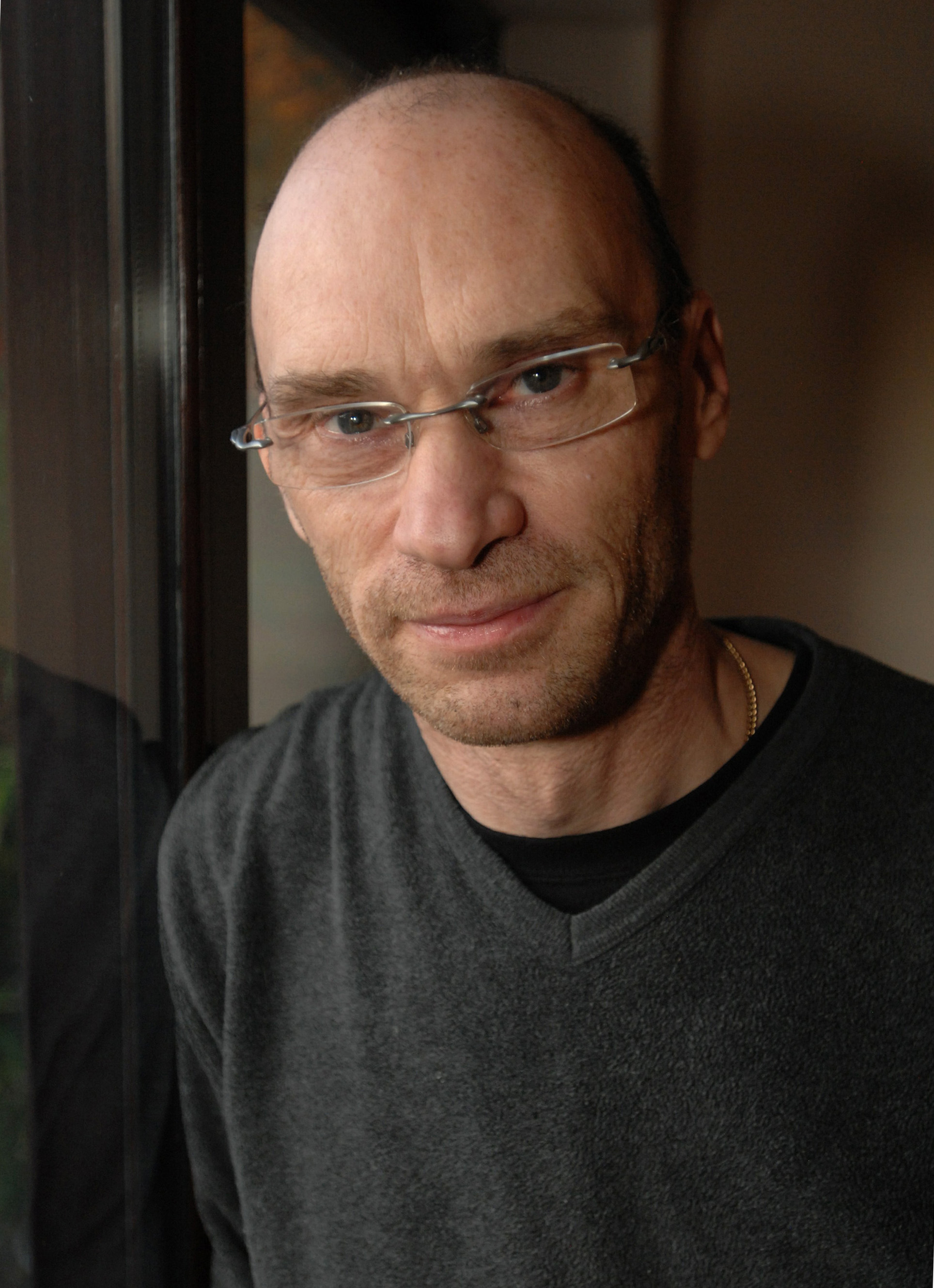
- James Wannerton 2018
- Born: February 18, 1959 (age 67); Manchester, United Kingdom
- Citizenship: United Kingdom
- Occupations: IT professional, artist, writer
- Website: jameswannerton.com

James Wannerton is an English IT professional, artist and writer. He experiences sound to taste synesthesia, including lexical-gustatory synesthesia; i.e. he can "taste" sounds, including words or word sounds.

As President of the UK Synaesthesia Association, a position he has held since 2006, he’s committed to raising awareness of synesthesia and also actively encourages other synesthetes to speak about their unique and fascinating experiences. He is also Vice President of the International Association of Synesthetes, Artists and Scientists (IASAS), based in the US.

Wannerton has been the subject of detailed research carried out by the University College London and the University of Edinburgh regarding his synesthetic condition.

His personal interests in synesthesia extend to researching cognitive perception, intuition, reasoning and cognitive dissonance and he has been the subject of a number of published research papers and general interest articles on the subject of synaesthesia both in Europe and the United States.

Wannerton has also contributed to a number of TV and radio programs broadcast by ABC, CBS, the BBC, ITV and Channel 4. He has also been interviewed for articles in the UK National press as well as in Europe, the US, Africa and Australasia. A 2011 interview with him on the Wellcome Trust blog includes details of his childhood and how synaesthesia has influenced his choice of friends, job and his relationships.

== Early life and education ==
James Wannerton was born in Manchester, England on 18 February 1959. His early years were spent in Willesden, North West London, the family moving from there first to Chertsey, Surrey, ending up in Welwyn Garden City, Hertfordshire in early 1969. Following a 14-month stay in Perth, Western Australia, he moved to Blackpool, Lancashire.

He attended Stepgates primary school in Surrey, Rosedale School in Welwyn Garden City followed by Monks Walk School, also in Welwyn. He became involved in synesthesia research in 1982 and again in 2000 when he teamed up with Professor Jamie Ward at University College London and Professor Julia Simner at the University of Edinburgh.

== Personal life ==
Wannerton divides his time between Blackpool, England and Stuttgart, in Germany.
