= List of fictional characters with bipolar disorder =

Fictional characters who exhibit and/or have been diagnosed with bipolar disorder.

== Film ==
| Year | Character | Actor(s) | Film | Director | Notes |
|---|---|---|---|---|---|
| 1993 | Mr. Jones | Richard Gere | Mr. Jones | Mike Figgis | |
| 2008 | Maria Elena | Penélope Cruz | Vicky Cristina Barcelona | Woody Allen | Not diagnosed in film, but exhibits drastic mood swings consistent with mania and depression. |
| 2009 | Mark Whitacre | Matt Damon | The Informant! | Steven Soderbergh | |
| 2011 | Mia Conlon | Olivia Wilde | On the Inside | D. W. Brown | |
| 2012 | Patrizio "Pat" Solitano Jr. | Bradley Cooper | Silver Linings Playbook | David O. Russell | |
| 2014 | Cam Stuart | Mark Ruffalo | Infinitely Polar Bear | Maya Forbes | The film is based on the filmmaker's life with her bipolar father. |
| 2015 | Gloria Gerringson | Taryn Manning | A Light Beneath Their Feet | Valerie Weiss | |
| 2015 | Carla | Katie Holmes | Touched with Fire | Paul Dalio | |
| 2015 | Marco | Luke Kirby | Touched with Fire | Paul Dalio | |
| 2019 | Rick Dalton | Leonardo DiCaprio | Once Upon a Time in Hollywood | Quentin Tarantino | |
| 2022 | Clemence Miller | Alex Heller | The Year Between | Alex Heller | |

== Television ==
| Year | Character | Actor(s) | Series |
|---|---|---|---|
| 1955 | Dame Edna Everage | Barry Humphries | Various stage and television productions |
| 1971 | Maude Findlay | Bea Arthur | All in the Family/Maude |
| 1982 | Cass Winthrop | Stephen Schnetzer | Another World |
| 1986 | Jimmy Corkhill | Dean Sullivan | Brookside |
| 1992 | Silver | April Peterson, Arielle Peterson, Ryanne Kastner, Megan Lee Braley, Mercedes Kastner, and Jessica Stroup | Beverly Hills, 90210/90210 |
| 1993 | Sonny Corinthos | Maurice Benard | General Hospital |
| 1994 | Sharon Newman | Monica Potter, Heidi Mark and Sharon Case | The Young and the Restless |
| 1995 | Cindy Cunningham | Laura Crossley and Stephanie Waring | Hollyoaks |
| 1997 | Kahn Souphanousinphone | Toby Huss | King of the Hill |
| 2002 | Craig Manning | Jake Epstein | Degrassi: The Next Generation |
| 2003 | Morgan Corinthos | Isador Talamo, Adonios Talamo, Jordan Cline, Dylan Cline, George Juarez, Aaron Refvem, Aaron Sanders, and Bryan Craig | General Hospital |
| 2004 | Ian Gallagher | Gerard Kearns | Shameless UK |
| 2004 | Karen Maguire | Rebecca Atkinson | Shameless UK |
| 2004 | Jean Slater | Gillian Wright | EastEnders |
| 2004 | Stacey Slater | Lacey Turner | EastEnders |
| 2006 | Pamela Douglas | Alley Mills | The Bold and the Beautiful |
| 2008 | Samantha Fitzgerald | Simone Buchanan | Neighbours |
| 2009 | Juan Alvarez | Lin-Manuel Miranda | House |
| 2010 | Eli Goldsworthy | Munro Chambers | Degrassi: The Next Generation |
| 2011 | Ruth Winters | Georgia Taylor | Casualty |
| 2011 | Carrie Mathison | Claire Danes | Homeland |
| 2011 | Ian Gallagher Monica Gallagher | Cameron Monaghan Chloe Webb | Shameless US |
| 2012 | Marta Del Sol | Leonor Varela | Dallas |
| 2013 | Rose/Mum | Debra Lawrence | Please Like Me |
| 2013 | Aurora de Martel | Rebecca Breeds | The Originals |
| 2013 | Zosia March | Camila Arfwedson | Holby City |
| 2015 | Andre Lyon | Trai Byers | Empire |
| 2016 | Even Bech Næsheim | Henrik Holm | Skam |
| 2017 | Alfred Nyssen | Lars Eidinger | Babylon Berlin |
| 2018 | Lizzie Saltzman | Jenny Boyd | Legacies |
| 2019 | Eliott Demaury | Maxence Danet-Fauvel | Skam France |
| 2019 | Sander Driesen | Willem De Schryver | WTfock |
| 2019 | Rue Bennett | Zendaya | Euphoria |
| 2019 | Vincent "Vinnie" O'Neill | Joe Gilgun | Brassic |
| 2019 | Andrew Deluca | Giacomo Gianniotti | Grey's Anatomy |
| 2019 | Hal Jackson | Joe Tippett | The Morning Show |
| 2019 | Maria Salazar | Maria Gabriela de Faría | Deadly Class |
| 2020 | Kat Baker Carol Baker | Kaya Scodelario January Jones | Spinning Out |
| 2020 | GaTa | GaTa as himself | Dave |
| 2020 | Ben Davis | Tom Pelphrey | Ozark |
| 2021 | Bernadette Stabler | Ellen Burstyn | Law & Order: Organized Crime |
| 2023 | "Ray" Pakon | “Khaotung” Thanawat Ratanakitpaison | Only Friends |
| 2024 | Maggie Donovan | Nicola Coughlan | Big Mood |
| 2024 | Oh Ri-na | Jung Woon-sun | Daily Dose of Sunshine |

== Comics ==
| Year | Character | Series/Franchise | Author/Publisher |
|---|---|---|---|
| 1939 | Namor | Invaders | Marvel Comics |
| 1942 | Two-Face | Batman | DC Comics |
| 1960 | Multi-Man | Challengers of the Unknown | DC Comics |
| 1962 | Hank Pym | Ant-Man | Marvel Comics |
| 1962 | Will Magnus | Showcase | DC Comics |
| 1963 | Doctor Polaris (Neal Emerson) | Green Lantern | DC Comics |
| 1963 | Magneto | X-Men | Marvel Comics |
| 1964 | Green Goblin (Norman Osborn) | Spider-Man | Marvel Comics |
| 1966 | Mimic | X-Men | Marvel Comics |
| 1966 | Peacemaker | Checkmate | DC Comics |
| 1968 | Creeper | Outsiders | DC Comics |
| 1968 | Polaris | X-Men | Marvel Comics |
| 1978 | Count Vertigo | Black Canary/Green Arrow | DC Comics |
| 2000 | The Sentry | The Sentry | Marvel Comics |
| 2001 | Alexander Nero | Green Lantern | DC Comics |
| 2019 | Wasp (Nadia van Dyne) | The Unstoppable Wasp | Marvel Comics |

== Literature ==
| Year | Character | Book | Author | Notes |
|---|---|---|---|---|
| 1949 | Mr. Market | The Intelligent Investor | Benjamin Graham | |
| 1962 | Esther Greenwood | The Bell Jar | Sylvia Plath | Character's struggles with depression were based on the ones that the author experienced herself. |
| 1987 | Annie Wilkes | Misery | Stephen King | Also appears in the 1993 film adaptation. |
| 1989 | Thad Beaumont | The Dark Half | Stephen King | Also appears in the 1990 film adaptation. |
| 1999 | Marigold Westward | The Illustrated Mum | Jacqueline Wilson | Also appears in the 2003 TV film adaptation. |
| 2011 | Leonard Bankhead | The Marriage Plot | Jeffrey Eugenides | The book's plot is heavily driven by Leonard's mental illness. |
| 2015 | Theodore Finch | All the Bright Places | Jennifer Niven | Also appears in the 2020 film adaptation. |

== Video Games ==
| Year | Character | Actor(s) | Game | Developer | Notes |
|---|---|---|---|---|---|
| 2010 | Alan Wake | Ilkka Villi, Matthew Porretta | Alan Wake, Alan Wake 2 | Remedy Entertainment | Alan describes himself as manic-depressive in the manuscript page Barry's Struggles With Artists in Alan Wake 2. |
| 2017 | Gregg Lee | No voice acting | Night in the Woods | Finji | Implied by the story and his characteristics to be bipolar. Also suggested by the character Bea in the game. |

== See also ==
- List of people with bipolar disorder
- List of autistic fictional characters
- List of fictional characters with disabilities
- List of fictional characters with disabilities in Comics, Manga, and Manhwa
- List of fictional characters with disabilities in video games
- Outline of bipolar disorder
