= Barret Wallace =

Fictional character

- Final Fantasy character
- Barret Wallace artwork by Tetsuya Nomura for Final Fantasy VII.
- First game: Final Fantasy VII (1997)
- Created by: Tetsuya Nomura
- Designed by: Tetsuya Nomura; Dan Suzuki (Remake)
- Voiced by: English: Beau Billingslea (Advent Children and Dirge of Cerberus); John Eric Bentley (2020–present); Japanese: Masahiro Kobayashi (2005-2020); Masato Funaki (Rebirth)

In-universe information
- Weapon: Gun arm
- Home: Corel

Barret Wallace (Japanese: バレット・ウォーレス, Hepburn: Baretto Wōresu) is a character from the 1997 role-playing video game Final Fantasy VII by Square (now Square Enix). He was created by character designer Tetsuya Nomura, and has since appeared in the CGI film sequel, Final Fantasy VII: Advent Children as well as other games and media in the Compilation of Final Fantasy VII series. As of Advent Children, Barret is voiced by Masahiro Kobayashi and Masato Funaki in Japanese, while Beau Billingslea and John Eric Bentley voice him in English.

Barret is first introduced in Final Fantasy VII as an eco-terrorist, leading the group AVALANCHE to bomb Mako reactors in Midgar as to avenge the losses dealt him by the megacorporation Shinra Electric Power Company, the Planet's de facto world government, who operate under the pretense of saving the Planet. Over the course of the story, Barret re-examines his efforts and focuses on pursuing the villain Sephiroth in an effort to protect the planet and the future of his adopted daughter, Marlene. Elements of the Compilation of Final Fantasy VII would later expand upon his character, detailing the character's history before and after the events of the original game.

The first black playable character in the Final Fantasy series, Barret's appearance and sometimes profane speech has been compared to that of Mr. T. He is also considered to be the first true father figure in the series, for his relationship with his adoptive daughter Marlene. His character arc is also considered a deconstruction of a revenge story, as a former coal miner seeking vengeance through eco-terrorism before eventually realizing revenge is not the right motivation. The character has earned praise, but also criticism and accusations of racism by some.

== Conception and design ==
Barret was designed by Tetsuya Nomura, and was present in Final Fantasy VII from its early development. Initially the game was to only have three characters: Barret, the protagonist Cloud Strife, and the heroine Aerith Gainsborough. During a phone call to project director Yoshinori Kitase, it was suggested that at some point in the game, one of the main characters should die. After much discussion as to whether it should be Barret or Aerith, the producers chose Aerith, as they felt Barret's death would be "too obvious".

Originally called Blow in the early planning stages of the game, Barret's name is based on the Japanese transliteration of the English word "bullet", and he was developed with the "Gunner" character class in mind. During an early demonstration of the game, Nomura felt his original design made Barret appear too short, and revised it. He stands at 6 feet 5 inches (196 cm) tall, and is the first black playable character in the series. He has a high and tight haircut and full beard, and wears an earring in his left ear. His attire consists of a jacket with torn sleeves, dark green pants, boots, a fingerless glove on his left hand, and metal bands surrounding his abdomen and left wrist. Nomura wanted to give each character in the game a striking feature on their character design, and in Barret's case it was the scars on his cheek.

Barret was a concept Nomura had wanted to introduce since the beginning of the game's development, a character with an arm replaced with a weapon. His right hand is replaced with a prosthetic gatling gun called a "Gimmick Arm", which he refers to as his "partner" in-game. When they were still planning out the technological aspects of the game's world however, early designs of his character had a bowgun on his arm instead. He was originally planned to have a medallion around his neck, but this was later changed to a set of dog tags.

=== Post-Final Fantasy VII ===
Barret's Advent Children outfit was made to fit "b-boy fashion", something they felt suitable for a black man.

When developing Advent Children, Nomura stated that because of the comparisons between Barret's original design and Mr. T, they decided to take it in a different direction for the film, implementing co-director Takeshi Nozue's suggestion to give him cornrows for his hair, while Nomura designed his face. Artist Yusuke Naora also influenced the design, developing his attire, which originally consisted of white overalls, before instead having him wear him a down vest. Other aspects of his design included the removal of the metal bands around his body, a white sleeve extending from the middle of his right forearm to his elbow which is fastened by straps, a black band on his left forearm surrounded by a pink string and bow, and a fishnet shirt that ends in torn fibers below his waist. The dog tags were altered to a bullet and medallion supported by a chain around his neck, and three rings covered his left hand. His Gimmick Arm was modified into a robotic prosthetic hand, developed by Nomura, with the only guideline being "a huge, over-the-top gun that transforms in a huge, over-the-top way". Nozue stated that these specifics made it difficult to work with, and decided to conceal the hand's transformation sequence into the gun as much as possible. Barret's arm tattoo was changed as well, but retained the "skull and fire" motif of the original. It was redesigned by Brazilian tattoo artist and fashion designer Jun Matsui, featuring a stylized black skull surrounded by flames, meant to give a strong impression of "masculinity and power". While the skull was done in black, the flames were in red to represent his "hot-headed personality", and utilized a tribal pattern as they had become popular in Japan at the time to represent vitality.

For Final Fantasy VII Remake, Square wanted to show Barret as a mature person, contrasting him with the younger Cloud when interacting with others. While they originally planned to use his Advent Children design, the staff later decided to give every party member a new look. The team noted that his design was the one most significantly changed from the original game, but tried to keep aspects of his original design in mind to give him a strong and stalwart appearance. Main character modeler Dan Suzuki commented that they went through several drafts on Barret's face before modeling him. Barret's shoulders and the back of his neck were also changed halfway through development to help "bring out his dependable, fatherly nature". His gun arm also went through significant changes, adding a motor and mapping out the internals to invoke a sense of realism, but also the mental image of Barret being able to disassemble and maintenance the weapon after missions. His melee weapons were designed to reflect his "blunt, no-nonsense personality". In the English dub of Final Fantasy VII Remake, John Eric Bentley voiced Barret. During localization, Bentley did not know the exact media in which he would portray Barret, but figured it had to do with the remake. Bentley researched in order to portray Barret properly, and was aided by the translators for the Japanese version, who gave him the context of the scenes he had to record. For him, one of the biggest challenges in his work was "representation", and claimed that Barret was more than a one-dimensional character. In regards to the story's mission to destroy the Mako Reactor 5, Square aimed to show Barret as a fitting leader for AVALANCHE and show how his relationship with Cloud is improved.

== Appearances ==
=== Final Fantasy VII ===
In Final Fantasy VII, Barret is introduced as the leader of the eco-terrorist organization AVALANCHE, which is situated in the city of Midgar and opposes the ruling company, Shinra, and their use of "Mako" energy as a power source, believing it to be killing the Planet. To this end, AVALANCHE bombs their Mako reactors, with the specific goal of saving the Planet. At the game's beginning, they have hired the mercenary Cloud Strife at the behest of his childhood friend and AVALANCHE member Tifa Lockhart, nicknaming him "Spiky" in reference to his hairstyle. After the deaths of several AVALANCHE members, Barret follows Cloud out of Midgar in pursuit of the game's villain, Sephiroth.

Along the way, he encounters a former friend of his, Dyne, who is armed similarly to him and forces Barret to fight him. After Barret defeats Dyne, Dyne kills himself. Later flashbacks reveal that Shinra wanted to build a Mako reactor in his hometown of Corel, an idea Barret advocated for. However, due to an accident at the plant, Shinra razed the town, killing Barret's wife in the process and causing Barret and Dyne to flee with Dyne's daughter, Marlene. Cornered, Dyne slipped off a cliff; Barret grabbed his hand, but Shinra soldiers opened fire and destroyed Barret's and Dyne's right and left hands respectively, causing the latter to fall to his presumed death. Barret adopted Marlene as his own daughter, had an "adapter" graft to his arm to interface with prosthetic weapons to aid in his combat against Shinra, and founded AVALANCHE. Dyne's death causes him to admit his grudge with Shinra is solely for revenge, with his earlier claims of "saving the world" meant to convince himself he was fighting for the greater good. Barret eventually shifts his goal to wanting to save the Planet for Marlene's sake, and he helps Cloud and his allies defeat Sephiroth to prevent the Planet's destruction.

Early drafts of Barret's background featured subtle differences, such as Marlene being as Barret's biological daughter and his wife being executed in front of him by a then-undecided Shinra executive. The attack on Corel was initially written to be due to the discovery of Mako energy and Shinra's desire to keep its existence a secret. His reunion with Dyne was also different, being written to culminate in a duel between the two in Corel's ruins, while Cloud and the others fought to investigate Shinra soldiers.

=== Other appearances ===
Barret appears in Before Crisis, a 2005 mobile phone-based prequel which shows the events prior to Corel's destruction. He helps the game's protagonists, the Turks, defend the Mako reactor, believing it to be the town's future. It is revealed that the reactor is under attack by the original AVALANCHE group, who are the cause of Shinra's attack upon the town. Unaware of their involvement, Barret uses their ideals to form his own branch of the group. He was also one of the characters included in Theatrhythm Final Fantasy: Curtain Call, utilizing his classic appearance.

In 2005, Barret appeared in the CGI film Advent Children, which is set two years after the events of the game. Barret places Marlene in Tifa's care and travels the world to rebuild the planet's infrastructure and find alternate power sources to replace Mako. He returns later to assist in combating the film's villains, the Remnants, and fight the summon creature Bahamut SIN. He later appears in a minor role in the 2006 video game Dirge of Cerberus, which is set one year after Advent Children, where he helps the protagonist Vincent Valentine prevent Omega WEAPON from destroying the planet. When choosing a voice actor for the film, Nomura was initially unsure of whether to have Masahiro Kobayashi do the role of Barret or another character, Loz. Kobayashi described his performance as treating Barret as "unrefined [...] but also dependable and unique", trying to keep his "upbeat character and good outlook in mind". He tried to give him a booming, confident-sounding voice, though at times was instructed to "take it up a notch". For Final Fantasy VII Rebirth, Mahito Funaki took over the role after Kobayashi retired from voice acting.

A novella entitled "Case of Barret" was released in 2007 exclusively for the "Limited Edition Collector's Set" DVD edition of Advent Children. Written by Kazushige Nojima as part of the On the Way to a Smile series, it details the events between Final Fantasy VII and Advent Children, examining Barret's reaction to his weapon and his belief that it made him a monster. At the conclusion of the story, Barret visits the creator of the adapter on his wrist and receives the prosthetic hand/gun combination seen in the film, reasoning that although he needs a hand, he also still needs a weapon to prevent others from having to fight. He then decides to return to Marlene. Barret was also added as a costume for the Mii "gunner"-class character and optional opponent in an update for Super Smash Bros. Ultimate.

== Critical reception ==
Barret's portrayal as a father to Marlene has received significant praise from critics. Series creator Hironobu Sakaguchi particularly found the images of her sitting on Barret's shoulder striking, due to his own private nature as a doting father.

Prior to the game's North American release, initial reactions to the character were positive, for representing African Americans in a role-playing game, a genre where they were rarely represented. Following its North American release, Barret's comparisons to Mr. T in the media has resulted in both praise and criticism, with most of the criticism accusing the character of serving as a negative racial stereotype of African Americans. IGN argued in favor of this point, citing his use of "stilted slang" and stating that the character stands out amongst the cast because "his dialog is written as if it was run through a broken ebonic translator", further noting a trend in Japanese games to apply such dialogue to characters based on their skin color. Journalist Jeremy Parish and Next Generation reader Russell Merritt viewed the character as a racist representation, although both also argued that cultural gaps between Japan and the United States, plus the lack of American translators for Final Fantasy VII may have been contributing factors, highlighting that the localization of Barret's character presents him in a more stereotypical manner, drawing parallels to Mr. T. He felt this likeness could be seen as an effort to create a character that resonated with American audiences, given the popularity of the actor among Americans. Kotaku's Gita Jackson expressed concern over his portrayal in Final Fantasy VII Remake, expressing a desire to see the character's dialogue and voice modernized from what she saw as a negative stereotype, and cited fan and even fellow Kotaku contributor interest in the same.

However in contrast on 1UP, Parish argued in favor of Barret, noting that while on the surface he appeared to be the "worst kind of stereotype", he was a great character with complexity, having made "difficult decisions in his life, and agonized over his losses". Parish went further to describe Barret as the "first true father figure the [Final Fantasy] series had ever seen", through his relationship with his adopted daughter and how much he doted on her. RPGamer's content manager Shawn Bruckner took the discussion further, arguing that claims of Barret's presentation being racist was oversimplification of the character's portrayal, and stated that while he was in some aspects a stereotype, in others, such as his compassion towards his daughter or guilt regarding his past actions, he was not. He added that Barret "shows us that a black man speaking in 'ebonics' is not something to fear" and that his portrayal was not racist, but instead the opposite. Andron Smith in the same publication meanwhile praised his paternal role for not only his daughter but the other characters, with his advice often reaching "the realm of philosophy" with concepts such as "A good man who serves a great evil is not without sin".

His characterization in the remakes also received positive reception. Siliconera's Jenni Lada stated that while early on in Remake he came across having "only has one volume and he only sees one side of things", the agony over losing his friends and concern over his daughter, namely trying to cling to any hope of her survival, showed Barret's actual heart and made her excited to see more of his portrayal in the future. Ash Parrish for Kotaku also commented on him, stating that while she had conflicted feelings about his portrayal and citing Jackson's earlier article for the site, she praised the fact Barret went against the archetype of a father with a violent past, noting that similar characters routinely seemed incapable or unwilling to be gentle with their children. By comparison Parrish praised Barret's affection towards his daughter and his refusal to let his past or who he was affect his relationship with her, adding that "Barret did the reading from day one and said the inherited trauma stops with me". She further noted that Barret went against the myth of Black absentee fathers, being "utterly devoted to a child that wasn't even his own blood way back in 1997" and expressed disdain that his role as a father was commonly overlooked by other publications. Gen Gumachi of Inside Games praised Rebirth for expanding on his character, portraying him as considering the views of the other party members while still retaining his "manly" personality as someone they could depend on. He also noted Barret's reflection his shortcomings of a father, and it presented an interesting duality to Barret's character: someone that had the wisdom of age, while also being a novice when it came to parenthood.

Pat Holleman, in his book Reverse Design: Final Fantasy VII (2018), considers Barrett's story to be the clearest illustration of the game's central "theme of tragic survivorship" and "a deconstruction of a revenge story" in the sense that it "dismantles the idea of revenge in an insightful way". This is presented through Shinra's destruction of his coal mining hometown, Barrett seeking vengeance through militant environmentalism before eventually realizing revenge isn't the right motivation, and safeguarding a future for his adoptive daughter Marlene who is the only surviving connection to his past. William Hughes of The A.V. Club notes that Barret and his terrorist cell AVALANCHE are one of the few examples of "heroic pop culture terrorists" in video games, keeping the game politically relevant in a post-9/11 world.
