= Masahiro Kobayashi (actor) =

Japanese actor and voice actor

- 小林 正寛
- Born: May 16, 1971 (age 55); Yakumo, Futami District, Hokkaido, Japan
- Occupations: Actor; voice actor
- Years active: 1995–2023
- Height: 1.91 m (6 ft 3 in)

Masahiro Kobayashi (小林 正寛, Kobayashi Masahiro; born May 16, 1971) is a retired Japanese actor and voice actor from Yakumo, Hokkaido. In 1995, he enrolled in the Seinenza Theater Company. Kobayashi's notable roles include Barret Wallace, and Ryid Uruk from the Final Fantasy video game series. He retired from the acting industry sometime after the release of Final Fantasy VII Remake.

== Filmography ==
=== Drama ===
- Seija no Kōshin (1998), Tatsuo Inose
- GTO (1998), Hajime Hakamada
- Kansatsui: Akiko Murō (1998), Detective Kita
- Kamen Rider Kabuto (2006), Negishi
- Gonzō: Densetsu no Keiji (2008), Detective Morioka
- Shōni Kyūmei (2008, episode 2), Asaoka
- Samurai High School (2009), Tetsuhiko Hirano
- Promise of Iyashi-ya Chirico (2015), Tokigawa Atsuya Officer
- Mikaiketsu Jiken: File. 05 (2016), Kunihiro Matsuo

=== Film ===
- Godzilla, Mothra and King Ghidorah: Giant Monsters All-Out Attack (2001), Teruaki Takeda
- Final Fantasy VII Advent Children (2005), Barret Wallace
- Koi Suru Kanojo, Nishi e (2008), Yamashita

=== Television animation ===
- Detective Conan (1996), Katsumi Yamada (ep. 42)
- Hajime no Ippo (2000), Jason Ozuma
- Human Crossing (2003), Hiroshi Ozaki (ep. 13)

=== Video games ===
- Jak and Daxter: The Precursor Legacy (2001), Warrior
- Dirge of Cerberus: Final Fantasy VII (2006), Barret Wallace
- Final Fantasy Type-0 (2011), Ryid Uruk
- Final Fantasy Type-0 HD (2015), Ryid Uruk
- World of Final Fantasy (2016), Bahamut
- Final Fantasy VII Remake (2020), Barret Wallace
- Final Fantasy VII: Ever Crisis (2023), Barret Wallace (archive recordings)

=== Dubbing roles ===
- South Park (2001-2006), Jerome "Chef" McElroy (season five to season ten)
