= Beau Billingslea =

American actor (born 1944)

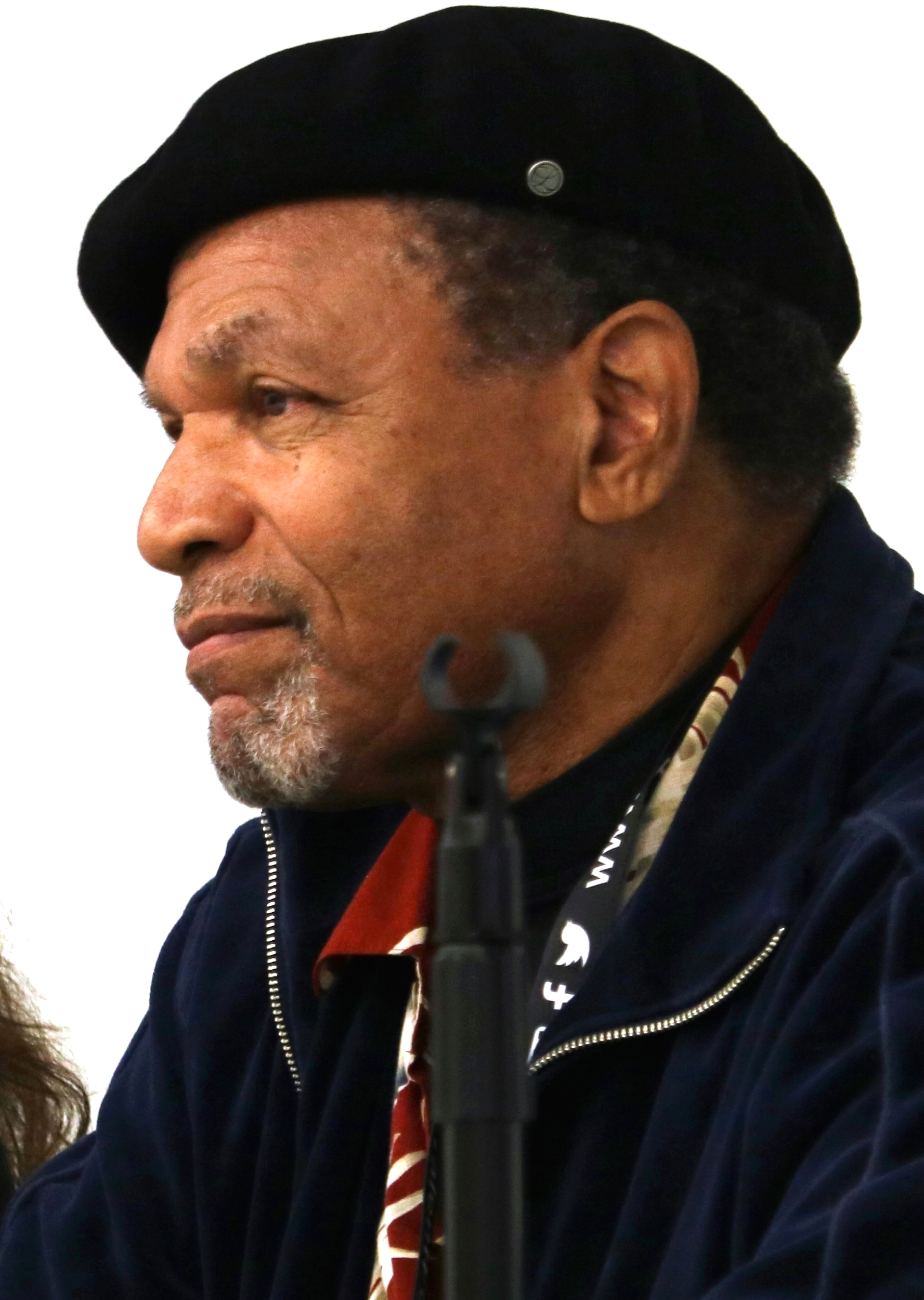
- Billingslea in 2016
- Born: John Billingslea; 1944 (age 81–82); Charleston, South Carolina, U.S.
- Education: University of Connecticut (BA, JD)
- Occupation: Actor
- Years active: 1977–present
- Spouse: Cecelia Billingslea
- Children: 2

John "Beau" Billingslea (born 1944) is an American actor, known as the voice of Jet Black in the critically acclaimed anime Cowboy Bebop, Ogremon in Digimon and Homura and Ay, the Fourth Raikage in Naruto Shippuden. In addition to voice acting, he appeared in many television shows and some films including North and South Book II: Love and War, Just Jordan, The Hannah Montana Movie, and Star Trek Into Darkness.

== Biography ==
=== Early life and career ===
Billingslea was born in Charleston, South Carolina. His mother was from Mt. Pleasant, South Carolina, near Charleston, and his father was from Macon, Georgia. His family moved to Meriden, Connecticut, where he grew up. At Maloney High School, he lettered in football, basketball and baseball and was offered a contract with the Kansas City Athletics, but at the advice of his father, went to University of Connecticut, where he played football and co-captained in his senior year. He graduated with a Bachelor's in Political Science in 1966. He was involved in ROTC and had to turn down entering the NFL in order to fulfill his military service, however, his commitment was deferred so that he could attend UConn Law School, where he graduated and passed the Connecticut bar in 1969. He became an officer in the Army's Judge Advocate General's Corps and had tours in Germany and Europe, working on a number of cases. In Germany, he also taught criminal law for the University of Maryland's extension program.

=== Acting career ===
While in college, Billingslea was encouraged by his fraternity brother to perform the lead role in a production of The Emperor Jones. This inspired him to go into acting, and he started getting involved professionally while he was in law school. After moving to Los Angeles, he was involved in a number of action shows, including TJ Hooker, Hunter, The Fall Guy and The A-Team. Billingslea mentioned in an interview that it was probably because of his military background that he was often cast as an officer. He portrayed Ezra in the TV miniseries North and South and was involved in a number of shows including Who's the Boss?, Murphy Brown and Married... with Children. On the Nick series Just Jordan he played Jordan's maternal grandfather Grant. In the TV sitcom Franklin & Bash he portrayed Judge Douglas. He also acted in films such as Night Shift, The American President, Hannah Montana: The Movie, Halloween H20: 20 Years Later and a remake of The Blob. In 2013, he portrayed Captain Abbot of the Starship Bradbury in the feature film Star Trek Into Darkness. He continues to act in stage plays such as Driving Miss Daisy where he was nominated for a Los Angeles Ovation Award in 2005.

=== Voice-over career ===
Billingslea's voice-over work started with radio spots for various businesses and organizations, including Honda, Hood and California Highway Patrol. He worked on several cartoons and anime, his most notable being Jet Black in Cowboy Bebop, which was broadcast on Cartoon Network's Adult Swim programming block. He also voiced starring characters Captain Michael Heartland in Argento Soma; Oji Tanaka in The Legend of Black Heaven, which was broadcast on International Channel and was the voice of Ogremon and various "mons" in Digimon. In Naruto, he voices Homura and Ay, the Fourth Raikage. He attended several anime conventions, including the 2016 Anime Expo, which united the Cowboy Bebop English voice cast. He has also been involved in narrating shows on The History Channel including Hero Ships, Modern Marvels, and Suicide Missions.

== Personal life ==
Billingslea lives in the Los Angeles area. He is married to Cecelia Billingslea; they have a son and a daughter together. In 1987, Billingslea was inducted into the Meriden Hall of Fame. In 2014, he gave the keynote address at a UConn Law School reunion.

== Filmography ==
=== Live-action filmography ===
==== Television ====
List of acting performances in television
Year	Title	Role	Notes	Source
1984–1987	Hunter	Officer Bolin	3 episodes: "The Hot Grounder", "Flashpoint", "The Shooter"	
1984–1985	Santa Barbara	Police Officer	Unknown episodes	
1985	The Atlanta Child Murders	Commissioner Lee Brown	TV miniseries	
1985	Dallas	Dr. Miller		
1985–1986	Hotel	Cop #2, Officer	Episode: "Recriminations"	
1985–1986	The A-Team	Armored car guard, Owens	2 episodes: "Incident at Crystal Lake K Love", "Family Reunion"	
1986	North and South	Ezra	TV miniseries, Book II: Love and War	
1985	Moonlighting	Announcer	Episode: "Brother, Can You Spare a Blonde?"	
1986	Trapper John, M.D.	Ambers	Episode: "Self-Diagnosis"	
1987	MacGyver	Meridan	Episode: "Family Matter"	
1989	Murder, She Wrote	Kei Murray	Episode: "Three Strikes, You're Out"	
1991	Line of Fire: The Morris Dees Story	Hal	Television film	
1993	NYPD Blue	Det. Hankin	Episode: "Oscar, Meyer, Weiner"	
1993	Married... with Children	Moderator	Episode: "Banking on Marcy"	
1994	Melrose Place	George	Episode: "Michael's Game"	
1994	L.A. Law	Detective Don Cuva	Episode: "Whistle Stop"	Uconn profile
1995	The Young and the Restless	Trenton Jordan		Uconn profile
1996	Terror in the Family	Judge Roubal	Television film	
1996	Married... with Children	Reverend Hightower	Episode: "A Bundy Thanksgiving"	
1997	Murphy Brown	Agent Scanlon	Episode: "Hero Today, Gone Tomorrow"	
1997	Mad About You	Security Chief	Episode: "The Birth: Part 2"	
1998	Profiler	Prison Director	Episode: "Coronation"	
1999	Baywatch	Ben Frazier	Episode: "The Big Blue"	
2001	Walker, Texas Ranger	Tom Jakes	Episode: "Justice for All"	
2001	NYPD Blue	Deputy Warden Jim Cullen	Episode: "Hit the Road, Clark"	
2001	JAG	Col. Klesko	Episode: "Ambush"	
2001	7th Heaven	Gene Carter		
2001–2002	Family Law	Judge Lawrence Harrington	Unknown episodes	
2003	Modern Marvels	Narrator	2 episodes	
2004	The West Wing	Agent Caswell		
2006	Gone, but Not Forgotten	Chester Shortridge	Television film (Lifetime)	
2007–2008	Just Jordan	Grant Cunningham	Unknown episodes	
2008	Hero Ships	Narrator	History Channel series	
2010	Wizards of Waverly Place	Burt Parker		
2011	General Hospital	Prof. Russell Stern		
2011–2014	Franklin & Bash	Judge James Douglas	Unknown episodes	
2014	Castle	Dr. Walter Parish	Episode: "Bad Santa"	
2016	Star Trek Continues	Vulcan Vice Admiral Stomm	Episode: "Embracing the Winds"	
2017	NCIS	Denny Rydell	Episode: "Burden of Proof"	
2020	Cherish the Day	Pastor Gordon	2 episodes	
2025	High Potential	Marvin Price	Episode: "The RAMs"	

==== Feature films ====
List of acting performances in film
Year	Title	Role	Notes	Source
1977	Alex Joseph and His Wives	FBI Agent Vernon Wood		
1982	Night Shift	Donny		
1983	10 to Midnight	Desk Sergeant		
1985	Real Genius	George		
1988	The Blob	Moss Woodley		
1994	In the Army Now	Sgt. Daniels		
1995	The American President	Agent Cooper		
1997	Final Justice	Charles	Made in 1994, released to video in 1997	
1998	Halloween H20: 20 Years Later	Detective Fitzsimmons		
2003	Leprechaun: Back 2 tha Hood	Thompson		
2005	Rebound	NCBA Board Member		
2009	Hannah Montana: The Movie	Mayor		
2013	Star Trek Into Darkness	Captain Abbott		

=== Voice-over filmography ===
==== Anime ====
List of voice performances in anime
Year	Title	Role	Notes	Source
1995	Macross Plus	Col. Millard Johnson		
1998	Outlaw Star	Narrator		
1998	Mobile Suit Gundam 0083: Stardust Memory	Admiral Kowen		
1999	Digimon	Ogremon, Sagittarimon, Parrotmon		
1999	Cowboy Bebop	Jet Black	as John Billingslea	
2000	Rurouni Kenshin	Gohei		
2000	The Legend of Black Heaven	Oji Tanaka	as John Billingslea, grouped under English Voice Talent	
2001	Rave Master	Bear / Dearhound		
2001–2002	Cyborg 009	Geromino Jr. / Cyborg 005		
2003	Argento Soma	Captain Michael Heartland		
2003	Wolf's Rain	Sea Walrus		
2004	Gungrave	Bear Walken		
2008	Digimon Data Squad	Leopardmon		
2009	Monster	Milan Kolasch		
2009–2015	Naruto: Shippuden	Homura, Ay (Fourth Raikage)		
2012	Tiger & Bunny	Ben Jackson		
2017	Hunter × Hunter	Light Nostrade	2011 series	
2017	Mobile Suit Gundam Thunderbolt: Bandit Flower	Orphe, Bull, Julio Sawasdee		
2018	Re:Zero − Starting Life in Another World	Valga "Rom" Cromwell		
2018	Last Hope (TV Series)	Cain Ibrahim Hasan	Also named Unit Pandora	
2021	Godzilla Singular Point	Additional Voice	Netflix dub	
2021	Super Crooks	Eric	Netflix dub	

==== Animation ====
List of voice performances in animation
Year	Title	Role	Notes	Source
2004	Megas XLR	Grrkek The Planet Killer & Orange Scaley Thing 1		
2015	Stakes	The Moon	Mini-series special for Adventure Time	
2019	The Forge	Booger	TIE special for Toonami	

==== Direct-to-video and television films ====
List of voice performances in direct-to-video and television films
Year	Title	Role	Notes	Source
1995	Street Fighter II: The Animated Movie	Dee Jay	As John Hammond	
2002	Cowboy Bebop: The Movie	Jet Black		
2006	Final Fantasy VII: Advent Children	Barret Wallace		
2013	Tiger & Bunny: The Rising	Ben Jackson		
2015	The Last: Naruto the Movie	Fourth Raikage / Ay	Nominated for Best Male Supporting Vocal Performance in an Anime Movie/Special, 4th Annual BTVA Anime Dub Awards 2015	

==== Feature films ====
List of voice performances in feature films
Year	Title	Role	Notes	Source
2012	War of the Worlds: Goliath	Abraham Douglas	Premiered in Malaysia in English; U.S. release in 2014	
2015	The Laws of the Universe Part 0	Goat-type Alien	Limited theatrical release	

==== Video games ====
List of voice performances in video games
Year	Title	Role	Notes	Source
1997	Outlaws	"Buckshot" Bill Morgan		
2003–2014	Dynasty Warriors games			
2004	Ace Combat 5: The Unsung War	"Swordsman" Marcus Snow		
2006	Ace Combat Zero: The Belkan War	Anthony "Sorcerer 1" Palmer		
2006	Dirge of Cerberus: Final Fantasy VII	Barret Wallace		
2011–2016	Naruto games	Ay (Fourth Raikage)		
2014	WildStar	Judge Kain, Osun Male		
2020	Deadly Premonition 2: A Blessing in Disguise	Tyrone Sanders		
2020	Fallout 76: Wastelanders	Paige, Chase Terrier, Deathklaus		
2022	Horizon Forbidden West	Garokkah, Emboh		
2023	Starfield	Percival Walker		
2024	Tekken 8	Leroy Smith		
2025	Bleach: Rebirth of Souls	Edrad Liones		

== Book sources ==
- Beck, Jerry (2005). The Animated Movie Guide. Chicago Review Press. 386pp. ISBN 9781569762226.
- Terrace, Vincent (2008). Encyclopedia of Television Shows, 1925 through 2010 (2d ed.). McFarland. ISBN 9780786486410.
- Riggs, Thomas (2007). Contemporary Theatre, Film and Television, Volume 74. Gale. ISBN 9780787690472.
