= Lexical–gustatory synesthesia =

Rare disorder in which a person's lexicon is perceived as taste

Lexical–gustatory synesthesia is a rare form of synesthesia in which spoken and written language (as well as some colors and emotions) causes individuals to experience an automatic and highly consistent taste/smell. The taste is often experienced as a complex mixture of both temperature and texture. For example, in a particular synesthete, JIW, the word jail would taste of cold, hard bacon. Synesthetic tastes are evoked by an inducer/concurrent complex. The inducer is the stimulus that activates the sensation and the taste experience is the concurrent.

== Experimental studies ==
There are many scientific standards in use to determine if a person actually has the genuine neurological condition of lexical–gustatory synesthesia. Scientists check for the behavioral hallmark of a significantly higher retest consistency after at least a year compared to control groups. Another scientific standard method to determine the legitimacy of ones synesthesia is to use Functional magnetic resonance imaging or functional MRI (fMRI) to determine which areas of the brain are active during the scan. A final method utilized by the prominent neuroscientist, V.S. Ramachandran, is the galvanic skin response (GSR). The GSR measures any fluctuations in the electrical resistance of skin. A high GSR could indicate that a person might be lying about their synesthesia condition. No GSR indicates that a person would be telling the truth about their synesthesia.

=== Experiences and phonological roots ===
There are many forms of lexical–gustatory synesthesia and the various taste sensations linked to the neurological condition vary widely from synesthete to synesthete. Examples of many well-known synesthetic taste experiences are recorded in case studies with singular participants that demonstrate the variability of the condition. In one case, PS is a patient that has taste experiences that happen in her head and not her mouth. Her tastes usually have both texture and temperature associated with the sensation. Some forms of lexical–gustatory synesthesia are triggered by thinking of the word's meaning, rather than its sound or spelling. Others are triggered by hearing or reading an inducer word. In many forms, more well-known words and words used with a higher frequency are more likely to have a strong taste association The phonological roots associated with this form of synesthesia drive the current research on lexical–gustatory synesthesia to determine which parts of the brain are active in synesthetes causing the neurological cross-talk condition and how the findings may relate to neurologically normal persons.

=== Tip of the tongue studies ===
Tip of the tongue (TOT) studies refer to studies when higher order characteristics of words such as the meaning, concept, or its syntactic category are retrieved from memory. These characteristics are called the lexeme of a word. Tip of tongue studies have shown that a word's lemma may be responsible for eliciting a taste sensation, not its phonologic sound or spelling. Further TOT studies determined the possibility that during TOT states, lexemes could be partially activated to yield phoneme-triggered tastes.

=== Case studies ===
==== JIW ====
JIW is a synesthete who automatically experiences tastes in and around his mouth when he hears words. He describes his tastes to be very similar to real tastes experienced when eating, but without the substance. JIW's case study to evaluate the consistency in a series of re-tests began in the late 1970s. In 2006, exactly 27 years after his initial study, JIW and a group of ten controls who were not a part of the original study were re-tested using words from original 1970s study. The controls were instructed that they would be immediately retested on their inducer-concurrent associations. The results of the 2006 study indicated that the controls had a mean consistency of about 47.9% while JIW had maintained a consistency of 100%.

JIW's tastes are largely correlated to foods that he would have eaten as a child. He is around ten times more likely to associate a word to the taste of chocolate than he would to the taste of something he experienced as an adult, such as beer or coffee. For example, when JIW hears a common word such as "this", he experiences the tastes of 'bread soaked in tomato soup'. Bread and tomato soup would have been common flavors JIW experienced in his childhood. It is hypothesized that some or all forms of lexical–gustatory synesthesia may trigger during early childhood development and lead to the over-representation of the flavors of childhood foods.

Both consistency studies and fMRI scans have validated JIW's lexical–gustatory synesthesia. A fMRI scan showed the bilateral activation of the Broca's area 43 in the brain during JIW's taste experiences. The Broca's area 43 is a part of the primary gustatory cortex which is responsible for the perception of taste. Further studies of the underlying brain regions involved in synesthetes like JIW could aid in identifying the root physiological mechanisms involved in lexical–gustatory synesthesia.

==== SC ====
SC is a synesthete who automatically experiences smells, tastes, and feelings of textures in her mouth and throat when she reads, speaks, or hears language, music, and certain environmental sounds. In SC's case study, researchers utilized fMRI to determine the areas of the brain that were activated during her synesthetic experiences. They compared areas of activation in SC's brain to those found in literature for other synesthetes, speech processing, language, and sound processing. In SC's scans, two important regions of the brain were largely activated during her taste sensations: the left anterior insula and the left superior parietal lobe. The scans led researchers to speculate that the anterior insula may play a role in SC's taste experiences while the superior parietal lobe binds together all of the sensory information for processing. Based on the findings of this study and others like it, it could be possible to determine the type of inducer that leads to synesthetic sensations based on the patterns of brain activity.

==== PS ====
PS is a 24-year-old synesthete who has a family history of synesthetic qualities. Her mother has lexical–gustatory synesthesia and her father has vocal tics. She is able to speak both English and French fluently and some basic Spanish. PS experiences vivid synesthetic tastes in both English and French, but not Spanish which she learned after the age of 9. She describes her synesthetic tastes as occurring automatically when she hears certain words. PS is one of the more unusual cases in that she experiences the taste sensations within her head and not her mouth. For PS, it was found that many of the taste concurrents experienced were linked to her childhood memories of foods eaten or items tasted. For example, the word Barbie tasted of 'sweet jelly with sour granules'. During PS's study, researchers determined the consistency of her responses to be greater than 99% over a three-week period, indicating the validity of her condition. A result of her study demonstrated that merely listening to someone speak a string of words in quick succession, such as reading, did not evoke synesthetic tastes. This led to the implication that single words must be focused on in order to activate the inducer-concurrent taste in certain forms of lexical–gustatory synesthesia.

== Possible neural basis ==
Many modern theories suggest that synesthesia is a result of differences that occur during the neuro-developmental process of maturation. It is possible that incomplete synaptic pruning during childhood development could lead to the continued maintenance of connections that are normally severed in the process. The maintenance of these connections would then lead to the cross-linking of areas in the brain that do not normally interact with one another and the possible mixing of senses. fMRIs are used to study these possible connections. Another possible neurological mechanism that may contribute to synesthesia is an increased structural connectivity in the brains of synesthetes as shown using diffusion tensor imaging (DTI).

== Possible genetic basis ==
Approximately 2%-4% of the population has some form of synesthesia. An even smaller percentage, around 0.2% or lower, have lexical–gustatory synesthesia. There appears to be a strongly linked genetic component to neurological cross-linking phenomenon. Lexical–gustatory synesthesia and other forms of synesthesia are familial, meaning that they are passed on through a family As many as 40% of synesthetes have an immediate family member with synesthesia. For example, PS's mother also had lexical gustatory synesthesia. One study suggests that there could be some sort of synesthesia gene passed through families that encodes for a predisposition to synesthesia but not necessarily its expression. Further studies into determining the exact synesthesia gene have not been successful, but it is possible that the over-expression of the serotonin 2A receptor on chromosome 13 resulting in a high receptor density could be the cause.

== Implications on brain function ==
It is believed that the same neurological pathways operate in both persons with synesthesia and neurologically normal individuals. These pathways are just exaggerated in those with synesthesia.

=== Studies in neurologically normal people ===
It has been shown that neurologically normal persons as young as 2.5 years of age demonstrate a type of synesthetic cross-modal associations. In 1929, psychologist Wolfgang Köhler ran an experiment in which a group of native Spanish speakers would assign the name "takete" or "baluba" to a set of round or jagged shapes. It was concluded that people had a strong preference to calling the jagged shapes "takete" rather than "baluba". Many scientists today think this is a synesthetic cross-modal association between the shape of the object and the phonemic inflection that the word makes when forming the word in the mouth. A similar "bouba" and "Kiki" food-word association study tested the synesthetic cross-modal associations of words and food tastes in neurologically normal participants. It was found that the participants could pick out certain abstract clues from the different foods tasted and associate them in a significant manner to meaningless non-words.

== In popular culture ==
=== Books ===
Truong, Monique Bitter in the Mouth (2011). The book's main character, Linda, can taste words.

=== Podcasts ===
The Hello Internet podcast featured a listener with lexical–gustatory synesthesia in Episodes #44 and #45 who emailed to discuss the topic.

== See also ==
- Synesthesia
- Ideasthesia
