= List of Fables characters =

This article is a list of characters in the comic book series Fables and its spin-offs (including Jack of Fables, Cinderella: From Fabletown with Love, Fairest, 1001 Nights of Snowfall, and Peter & Max: A Fables Novel) published by Vertigo Comics.

== New York Fables ==
=== Snow White ===
Snow White is a major character in Fables. She is based on two stories recorded by the Brothers Grimm, Snow-White and Rose-Red and the more famous Snow White and the Seven Dwarves.

Snow White was born in a small cottage and lived there with her younger twin sister Rose Red. In their youth, they were inseparable, swearing to each other that nothing would ever come between them, but they later had a falling out. Snow eventually married Prince Charming, but they divorced after she found him in bed with Rose. As revealed late in the series' run, she and Rose Red are part of a deeply magical bloodline in which all the sisters of each generation must attempt to kill each other, the sole survivor inheriting all of the family's power. Their mother, Lauda, had attempted to end the cycle by having only one child, but she was confounded when she gave birth to twins.

As of the beginning of the story, Snow White has been a long time member of Fabletown government, where she gradually climbed in ranks to become deputy major. She has a sharp, no-nonsense personality and expresses a distaste for "playing games" in preference of people being direct about their motives. During the run of Fables, she contends with Fabletown's enemies, has children with and eventually marries Bigby Wolf, and lives through a rivalry with her sister, Rose Red. Snow's seven children are born at the same time, and only one of them can pass for fully human at that time. By Fabletown law, she is required to move with them to the Farm, so she leaves her position as deputy mayor and is succeeded by Beauty. Nonetheless, Snow helps organize the conflict with the Adversary and Mr. Dark in War and Pieces and The Dark Ages. The last few series of Fables focus on the growing conflict between Snow and Red as their ancestral power begins to demand confrontation. Other characters take side and divide into factions. Instead of fighting to the death, however, Snow and Rose decide to at least attempt to defy the compulsion to kill each other. One of the last scenes in Fables shows Rose Red coming to visit Snow and Bigby after centuries of successful peace.

Jason Marc Harris, writing in a special issue of Humanities, contrasted the chapters that covered the war against the Adversary, which are generally considered either examples or deconstructions of masculine ideas of warfare, with the female-led final arc, which focused heavily on the increasingly military rivalry between Snow White and Rose Red: "The martial prowess that Bigby, Prince Charming, and Boy Blue once represented becomes overshadowed by the enduring connections of the extended Fables family, a community where Rose and Snow reconcile".

Snow White also appears in the 2013 video game adaptation of Fables, The Wolf Among Us, which is canon to the comics and serves as the prequel. She is voiced by Erin Yvette.

=== The Beauty and the Beast ===
Still together after nearly one thousand years, Beauty and Beast escaped from the Homelands with barely more than the clothes they were wearing. Both take relatively low-paid jobs, Beast maintaining the Fabletown buildings and Beauty working in a bookshop, earning between them enough to make ends meet. Their lives are hampered by Beast's tendency to shift back and forth between his human and beastly forms depending on his wife's mood towards him, but the two are nevertheless a loving couple. With the election of Prince Charming to Mayor of Fabletown during the events of "The Mean Seasons", their lives take a turn for the better. As neither Bigby Wolf or Snow White are willing to work alongside Charming, they resign, and the Prince offers Beauty and Beast the available jobs.

Beast, now sheriff, allied himself with Frau Totenkinder (the most powerful witch in Fabletown) and finally had his curse fixed, allowing him to transform into his Beast form at will. Whether he was aware that it was Totenkinder who inflicted the curse on him in the first place is unknown; this occurred pre-amnesty, so he is legally unable to retaliate. While initially overwhelmed by the complexities of the job, he eventually grows into the role.

Beauty takes Snow's position as deputy mayor, and also learns to cope with all of the responsibility. Early in her tenure, Prince Charming tries to seduce her, but she rebuffs him, threatening to send her husband after him if he tries again. It is notable that Beauty realizes, as a result of remarks made by Prince Charming during this seduction attempt, that her actions and words toward her husband are not generally as kind as she herself perceived; she subsequently resolves to be nicer to Beast.

After the arrival in Fabletown of the Imperial Emissary, Lord Hansel, during the "Sons of Empire" story-arc, and the subsequent need to keep track of both him and his staff, Beast asks for, and is given, additional funding and manpower. This includes the zephyrs, provided by Bigby Wolf's father, the North Wind, which act as spies. During the war against the Empire, as depicted in the "War and Pieces" arc, Beast remains in Fabletown, commanding the troops stationed there in case of a retaliatory assault by the Empire.

As shown in the "Great Fables Cross Over", after having a brief argument with Beast about his behavior with Bigby, Beauty and her husband retire to a tent for makeup sex. Afterwards, Beauty feels that there was something magical about this sex. In a subsequent, Beauty reveals she is pregnant. The child is born premature, but there are no apparent complications. The child, a little girl, is named Bliss, and seems normal. It is later revealed that Beast's curse was transferred to Bliss, leaving Beast powerless.

In the Fairest story "Lamia", it is revealed that Beauty is a lamia who was driven from her home after a man got her in the family way. The man's wife had some friends run Lamia out of town. They followed her to another world, where Lamia met a beautiful woman. Lamia, having so recently been abused for beauty's sake, hated the woman on sight and killed her, because "everything beautiful leads to ruin in the end". Lamia then took the woman's form in order to adopt her peaceful and simple way of life. She kept the form so long that the woman's personality became her. She met Beast, and they fell in love. Every few decades, Beauty becomes herself Lamia again. When this happens, Beast tries to catch her in time and lock her away. Sometimes she escapes, and embarks on a killing rampage, targeting rapists and men who abuse women. Beast then assumes the identities of famous heroes of detective fiction (such as Auguste Dupin, Sherlock Holmes, Hercule Poirot, Sam Spade and Philip Marlowe) and has to stop her before authorities can catch her. Bigby Wolf has threatened Beast to deal with the matter permanently - even if it means killing Beast as well. Beauty never remembers the incidents afterward and Beast never tells her the truth.

Beast is considering making a new home for himself, his wife and their daughter in Flycatcher's kingdom in the Homelands, because Beauty will be safer there, as the "mundy" police keeps getting better and better at investigating and collecting evidence, and will catch Beauty sooner or later. The story's ending suggests that Beauty may be turning into Lamia again sometime in the near future. In the Fairest graphic novel Fairest In All The Lands, Beauty is killed by a serial killer and resurrected without the Lamia persona. Beast is ultimately killed by a feral, controlled resurrected Bigby Wolf. Years later, a grown up Bliss and Beauty have a business where they solve the problems of people (such as murders and kidnappings).

=== Trusty John ===
The doorman at the Woodland building, Trusty John was almost universally popular. Amiable and good-natured, John enjoyed his job and was always pleased to see everybody. As such, it came as a complete shock to everyone when Kay unmasked John as a spy for the Adversary. Baffled as to how the 'most faithful Fable in history' could turn against them, John was interrogated by Prince Charming, Beauty and Beast; he explained to them that, long before signing up to the Fabletown compact, he had sworn an unbreakable vow of loyalty to his King, who he believed had been killed leading his forces against the Adversary. It turned out that this had not been the case, that his King, now working for the Adversary, had contacted John and ordered him to spy on his fellow Fables. Bound by his vow, which overruled the later compact, John had no choice but to obey and spent the next four years passing information to the enemy before Kay caught him. Despite being sorely tempted to forgive him, given the circumstances, Charming realised that treason, no matter what the situation, must be dealt with harshly. John chose to jump down the Witching Well as an alternative to execution.

On his mission into the Witching Well, as depicted in the story-arc The Good Prince, Flycatcher recruited John as his squire, offering him the possibility of redemption by accompanying him. Following the completion of his quest, Flycatcher, now King Ambrose of Haven, announced that John would henceforth be known as Trusty John once more, and appointed him to be Lord High Chancellor of the kingdom, putting him in charge of the day-to-day running of the new realm.

=== Grimble ===
The security guard at the Woodland apartment building that forms the centre of Fabletown, Grimble is the troll from the tale of the Three Billy Goats Gruff and quite possibly many other tales where a troll features. He was turned into a harmless bird by Prince Brandish/Werian Holt when he began to unravel behind his alias. In his bluebird form, Grimble becomes crucial in the death of Brandish, having been sent on a secret mission by the Thirteenth Floor to locate Brandish's heart. Under the protection of layers of stealth spells by Maddy and magic that will send him to far reaches where Brandish's heart in contained in an entrance-less fortress, Grimble sneaks in through the air grills in the fortress and destroys Brandish's heart, causing Brandish to collapse and die during his duel against Flycatcher. Over the many years that follow, Grimble bitterly assumes that the Thirteenth Floor did not bother to provide him the magic to return to Fabletown after he had completed his task and gradually becomes accustomed to living as a bird.

=== Bufkin ===
A winged monkey from the Oz tales, Bufkin acts as Fabletown's librarian and thus is generally found in the cavernous business office, where he both works and sleeps. Close to Boy Blue, he hid for a week when his friend left for the Homelands, thinking that he would be blamed for not stopping him. Bufkin lacks wisdom, although he is certainly not stupid, is occasionally mischievous and prone to drinking heavily and stealing the Mayor's booze, nevertheless, he is generally a good worker and rarely complains. During the events of the Storybook Love arc, when everybody was out of the office, Bufkin came to the conclusion that he was now in charge and decided to rename Fabletown Bufkintown, a change that only lasted as long as it took somebody else to find out about it. He apparently reads a lot of the books in the library, and it is suggested that he has learned skills like lockpicking from this. On learning this Prince Charming threatened to kill Bufkin if he stole his alcohol again, Bufkin is then seen with another book—one relating to political assassination. After the magics holding Fabletown together have been unravelled he was stranded in the business office along with all the formerly imprisoned fables. During this time he was able to bottle the Djinn and kill Baba Yaga and her knights.

After this, Bufkin climbs the Business Office's tree and finds himself in Ev (a neighbor to the Land of Oz). He is accompanied by Lily, one of the Barleycorn maidens who has a huge crush on him. While sitting in one of Ev's magic lunch box trees, he accidentally rescues a group of Oz-Fables from the Nome King enforcers. Bufkin then forms a resistance movement in order to overthrow the evil Nome King. Afterward, he, Lily and Hangy – a hanging rope which Lily brought to life, had many adventures in many different worlds before his as well as Lily’s retirement and death.

=== Prince Charming ===
Although charming and handsome, Prince Charming is a pathological womanizer, a liar, a narcissist, and an all-around rogue. He was also raised as a prince, to understand sacrifice necessary to be an effective leader, and the kind of king that sacrifices all to safeguard his subjects. His known previous wives in chronological order were Snow White, Briar Rose (Sleeping Beauty) and Cinderella; the latter two of his ex-wives were introduced to him by their shared fairy godmother. It is also revealed in the Jack of Fables' comic that Prince Charming is Jack Horner's father. It is most likely that Charming never knew of their relations to one another. He lived in Europe after leaving the Homelands, living off the kindness of various nobles and ex-nobles. He returned to Fabletown just before Rose Red's "murder". He hatched an intricate scheme, killing Bluebeard in a duel during the Storybook Love arc, putting Bluebeard's substantial wealth directly into Fabletown's treasury, then, during the events of March of the Wooden Soldiers and The Mean Seasons, successfully running for the position of Mayor of Fabletown against Old King Cole, so he would have access to those funds. He, however, made some false presumptions (and thus promises) and had a difficult time in office with public opinion turning against him. Following his victory, he appointed Beauty and Beast to the positions of deputy mayor and sheriff respectively. Spending a large amount of time with Beauty on the job, he attempted to begin an affair with her; she rejected his advances, threatening to set Beast on him if he persisted.

In spite of his persistent unfaithfulness and narcissistic ego, Prince Charming has a good side few are aware of. During the Storybook Love story arc, he expressed deep regret that his betrayal of Snow White hurt her so badly, and took it upon himself to kill Bluebeard partly because he knew Bluebeard planned to murder Bigby Wolf, whom Snow had grown fond of. Before the Battle of Fabletown in March of the Wooden Soldiers, he supervised building the barricades, then fought bravely during the battle itself, defying the gun-carrying wooden soldiers while armed with a sword. In the battle's aftermath, he led the firefighters that went into the damaged buildings to extinguish the last blazes. Despite the fact that he took the job of mayor primarily for its economic benefits, he eventually dedicated himself sincerely to the duties of mayor, including setting up defenses for Fabletown against the Adversary and, in the Happily Ever After arc, giving Bigby Wolf land next to the farm in order to live with his new wife, Snow White, and their children.

In the run-up to the war against the Empire, Charming resigned as mayor, returning the job to King Cole, in order to focus on the war effort. During the War and Pieces storyline, he held the position of Combat Commander on the skyship Glory of Baghdad built by the Arabian Fables and commanded by Sinbad, running the offensive and defensive operations of the ship during the war and the Glory's mission to bomb the gates connecting the Imperial homeworld to the rest of the Empire. After the Glory's destruction, Charming, despite serious injuries, dragged a bomb by foot to the last remaining gate, with Sinbad accompanying him to defend against hostile forces. Arriving at their destination against considerable opposition, Charming dragged the bomb into the gatesite, stating that he would set the longest fuse possible to give himself the best opportunity to get clear of the blast. In the Fairest story arc The Return of the Maharajah, it is revealed that Charming survived his injuries. Nathoo (from Rudyard Kipling's The Jungle Book) found him and brought Charming to the Indu (the Homelands version of India), where he was nursed back to health. Because Charming is a popular Fable, his wounds healed quickly.

In 1001 Nights of Snowfall, a prequel to the Fables series, the real reason Prince Charming cheated on Snow White with Rose Red in the first place was given. Contrary to popular belief, he had not yet known of his inability to remain faithful in marriage. By request of a wedding gift, he taught Snow fencing lessons and had taken charge of investigating a series of murders around the kingdom (the victims were revealed to be the Seven Dwarves). He states one of the violent of prisoners did it and had him executed. This kept peace with the dwarves. He had known it was really Snow White, as the sword wounds indicated progressive swordsmanship. Because he had lost his trust in her, he had Rose Red move in with them in the castle, and shortly after, cheated on Snow with Rose Red, revealed in the Rose Red story arc to be a result of Rose Red seducing him, despite his initial resistance.

=== Cinderella ===
Prince Charming's third wife, Cinderella is often seen as loud and rambunctious by her fellow Fables, and usually goes simply by the name Cindy. She is the owner and manager of her own shoe store, the Glass Slipper, in Fabletown. This is her first job, and possibly main income, but she also has another important job: she secretly works for the Sheriff (first Bigby Wolf and then later Beast) as one of his off-the-record spies.

Cinderella was recruited as his off-the-books agent shortly after her arrival in the mundane world, approximately two centuries prior to the present-day setting of the comics. Missions shown have included seducing Ichabod Crane in Paris to get him to reveal that he was willing to turn traitor and provide valuable intelligence to the Adversary. She served as an envoy to giants of the Cloud Kingdoms, aiming to forge an alliance with them, a mission that ultimately put her in debt to Frau Totenkinder, but that also cleared the way for Bigby Wolf's covert insertion into the Homelands depicted in Happily Ever After, a mission where Cinderella served as his briefing officer. She also participated in the interrogation of the wooden soldiers captured after the Battle of Fabletown, and later helped with the interrogation of Baba Yaga. She has had a long vendetta with Dorothy Gale, both on a physical and ideological level. Whereas Dorothy was a mercenary motivated by the thrill of murder and chaos, Cinderella is motivated by duty and pragmatism. After finally defeating Dorothy, Cinderella took her magical slippers as bounty, and is now presumably also able to use them for assuming disguises.

Cinderella considers herself to be the finest secret agent who has ever lived, on the grounds that, being immortal, she has had multiple human lifespans to perfect her craft and, uniquely among Fables, has had access not only to the magical resources of the Fables, but also all the technologies and techniques perfected by the mundane population. Her public persona is loud, brash and carefree, with most of her fellow Fables dismissing her as a shallow and largely irresponsible playgirl. On a mission, however, Cinderella is calm, calculating and frequently ruthless, displaying no qualms about killing when required. Cinderella eventually meets her end after finally killing Frau Totenkinder, partly at the request of Snow White given Totenkinder's decision to side with Rose Red and to even the score between them.

=== Old King Cole ===
Cole's realm was easily overwhelmed by the Adversary's forces. Only with the assistance of his loyal and loving subjects, was he able to hide in the woods and survive long enough to reach Earth.

Mayor of Fabletown since its founding, Old King Cole preferred to leave the actual running of the place to Snow White, his deputy, focusing more on the more ceremonial and formal aspects of the role himself, an arrangement that generally worked well. He was eventually challenged for the position by Prince Charming who won after making a series of rash promises that he would prove to be unable to keep. Leaving the Mayor's penthouse apartment, he briefly roomed with Boy Blue, who had lost his roommate Pinocchio during the Adversary's assault on Fabletown. He then moved into Beauty and the Beast's home, they themselves moved into Snow White's old place. A well-meaning and amiable man, King Cole found his defeat profoundly depressing. When the Arabian Fables arrived in Fabletown, Cole found renewed importance as one of the few Fables fluent in Arabic, and his diplomatic acumen led to a close friendship with Sinbad. Before this, Cole had been portrayed as a figurehead whose primary duty was glad-handing Fabletown's budget; his diplomatic sessions showed a shrewdness and cunning that he had not displayed before then. He has since become the ambassador to Fabletown East in Baghdad. He returned to Fabletown briefly to preside over the wedding of Snow White and Bigby Wolf. At the start of the war with the Empire Prince Charming resigned his position as mayor, returning the job to King Cole.

Cole remained mayor after the war and, as before, delegated official duties over to the deputy mayor, who was now Beauty. When Mister Dark escaped his imprisonment, the enchantments upon Fabletown began to fade and caused the entire building structure to crumble. Cole had a brief moment of uncertainty until Grimble gave him an impassioned speech of his responsibility as mayor. Cole led the Fable community to evacuate to The Farm so as to regroup and figure out what to do from there. In addition, he and Beauty have also taken over babysitting duties of Bigby and Snow's cubs while the parents were sent to investigate Jack Horner's claims regarding the Literals as well as Rose Red descending heavily into depression following Boy Blue's death.

Cole's diplomatic skills later served the Fable community when more Mundies became aware, and thus frightened, of them.

=== Hobbes ===
Originally butler to Bluebeard, Hobbes the goblin stayed on to work for Prince Charming after the Prince slew his former master. Calm and dignified, Hobbes is nevertheless a formidable fighter and fought savagely during the Battle of Fabletown. Hobbes worked tirelessly in Charming's election campaign and has generally proved invaluable to his master. He possesses a glamour for use in public, presumably provided by his masters, and notes proudly that he maintains an unblemished record of reliability with it. His great expertise as manservant leads him to be apparently very well paid; when asked about it, Prince Charming dryly noted that Hobbes was better paid as a servant than he was as Mayor himself. Hobbes is the first to notice that the gold covering Mr. Dark is cracking. He is also the first to fall to the now freed Mr. Dark. Mr. Dark keeps Hobbe's skull, intending to eat the goblin's teeth later, in order to summon his spirit to serve him. Mr. Dark is killed by the North Wind before this happens.

He is presumably named after the English philosopher Thomas Hobbes.

=== Briar Rose ===
Better known as Sleeping Beauty, Briar Rose was Prince Charming's second wife. She escaped from the Homelands with close to nothing, but a blessing received on her christening day, which promised that she would always be wealthy, came to her rescue, and she rapidly gained great wealth through successful speculation on the stock market. As such, she lives in a luxurious apartment filled with expensive furnishings. Her curse, however, remains in effect, with the slightest prick of her finger causing her falling asleep, followed by everybody else in the building, which is then surrounded by rapidly growing thorn-bearing plants. A kiss from a loving "prince" resets the curse back to the start. It has been revealed during a talk with Bigby that in one incident when her finger was pricked, the police sent in a police dog named "Prince" and his innocent dog kiss awoke her, the affection of a dog being honest and true.

While generally a hazard, forcing Rose to take extreme care and wear gloves at all times, her curse has proved useful on at least two occasions. The first was in the story A Two-Part Caper when journalist Tommy Sharp threatened to reveal what he had discovered about the Fables, the curse was employed to put the inhabitants of his building to sleep while a team led by Bigby Wolf ransacked his apartment.

The second occasion was during the war against the Empire, as depicted in the "War and Pieces" story-arc, when the curse was deployed within the Imperial capital, putting the inhabitants of the entire city to sleep, depriving the Empire of most of its senior officials and the majority of their combat-ready sorcerers. Recently, the city was burned to the ground, but not before Briar Rose and the Snow Queen were carried away, still asleep, by a mysterious cadre of goblins.

In the Fairest story arc Wide Awake, a bottle imp tells Ali Baba, who is seeking treasures in the burned down city, about the sleeping girl that is blessed with eternal wealth and riches, but needs to be woken with true love's kiss from a prince. Ali Baba sneaks into the goblins' encampment and kisses the sleeping Briar Rose, who awakens from the spell, along with the Snow Queen. The Snow Queen seeks vengeance on Rose for putting her to sleep for years, and takes both of them captive. Instead of killing them, the Snow Queen forces Jonah the bottle imp to tell her stories of Briar Rose's life, as the Snow Queen "is addicted to good stories", and Jonah is very good at telling stories. While Ali Baba and Briar are forced to spend time with Lumi, Ali Baba realizes that he has no feelings for Briar after all, but is in love with Lumi. It is revealed that because Ali Baba risked his life to wake and rescue Briar Rose, his actions fell under the definition of true, but not romantic, love.

Briar also defeats Hadeon the Destroyer, the evil fairy from the fairy tale. Briar's fairy godmothers then turn Hadeon into a car that can travel to any world, and the spaces between worlds. The car has to serve one thousand times before it will revert to Hadeon. Briar uses the car to travel back to the newly re-built Fabletown, as seen in the Fables story arc Snow White. When the car has been used nine hundred and ninety-nine times, she plans to take it to the junkyard and have Hadeon destroyed in a car crusher. In the Fairest graphic novel Fairest In All the Land, Briar Rose is revealed to be having a secret relationship with the dryad Prince Aspen, something no one in Fabletown knew about, but a murderous Goldilocks murdered the two for giving into "carnal" desires, burning them both together. Cinderella is able to resurrect her, but she could not bring back Prince Aspen.

Briar Rose's ultimate fate is given in the next-to-last compilation, Fables: Happily Ever After. After many years of adventuring, Briar Rose, who had been scratched by an undead blade, begins to succumb to a zombie-like curse. She returns to Fabletown to collect Hadeon, who has exactly one ride left before returning to her own form. Briar Rose commands Hadeon to take her "to the end of the universe" and then pricks her finger, declaring that if she must turn into an undead horror, she will not be awake for it and will keep her oath to prevent Hadeon from harming anyone again.

=== Doctor Swineheart ===
One of The Three Army Surgeons from the Grimm story of that name, Swineheart works at the Knights of Malta Hospital in New York, where the Special Research Section is in fact a cover for the private Fables-only medical facility. Swineheart took charge of Snow White's recovery after she was shot in the head by Goldilocks during the abortive rebellion at the Farm, and also dealt with her extensively during her pregnancy with Bigby's children. A battlefield surgeon without peer, his services proved invaluable during the battle of Fabletown. He appears to have taken on some mundane attitudes, most likely because he deals with mundane patients as well as his work with the Fables, to the extent that he starts to suggest the possibility of abortion when Snow expresses her unhappiness about the scandal her pregnancy has resulted in. The appalled Snow stops him going any further, threatening to throw him out of Fabletown if he persists.

=== Rapunzel ===
Cursed by Frau Totenkinder (for displeasing her by being a 'slutty little girl'), Rapunzel's hair is constantly growing, at a rate of four inches an hour, so she has to live under the most restrictive conditions to prevent any mundanes from noticing. She was part of the group of Fables who were part of the last stand in the old territory and she was also present at the Remembrance Day for those who died in the battle at the Last Castle. It is revealed in Cinderella: From Fabletown with Love that Cinderella's Fairy Godmother showed Rapunzel's prince the way to the tower she was kept in, mainly to spite Frau Totenkinder. In Fairest it is revealed that Rapunzel does not believe Totenkinder has reformed, and has a disdain for her. It is also revealed that in order to survive the winter, Rapunzel's mother sold her for a handful of gold to Totenkinder to be the witch's apprentice. Rapunzel and the prince had a passionate love affair which resulted in Rapunzel's pregnancy. When Totenkinder found out, she threw Rapunzel out. Despite the bad history Rapunzel does call Totenkinder "Mom", though it could be to get on Totenkinder's good side.

After being thrown out by Totenkinder, Rapunzel tried to find her lost lover. Unbeknownst to her, Cinderella's fairy godmother forbade the prince to contact Rapunzel again, as the godmother had "plans for her". No one would take the homeless Rapunzel in, because of her past as Totenkinder's ward. As Rapunzel was giving birth to her children, a strange woman came to her aid. The woman drugged her and stole the children, who were twin girls. Rapunzel spent centuries looking for her daughters across a hundred worlds. Eventually, she gave up and sailed off the edge of the world in a ship, planning to die. Instead, she washed up on the shore of one of The Hidden Kingdom, a Fable Homeland populated by people and creatures of Japanese mythology and culture. There, she became a member of the Emperor's court, and had a lesbian romance with a female kitsune named Tomoko.

It is also revealed that Rapunzel is Okiku from the famous Japanese ghost story; while spending time at the Emperor's court, she took Okiku as her new name. The shogun had Rapunzel's lover banished, along with many other yokai. He confiscated the kitsune's foxfire - her soul, which she kept outside her body. The shogun kept the foxfire in a safe locked with a sliding puzzle. When Rapunzel tried to get the foxfire back for Tomoko, she discovered that she was unable to solve the puzzle slide, and broke a plate in anger. The shogun caught her trying to break her into the safe, and beat her up and threw her limp form down a well. Rapunzel was unable to climb out the well, and ate her hair in order to survive. She coughed up hundreds of hairballs, which talked to her with spiny mouths. Rapunzel knotted several of them into her hair, which gave her the purchase she needed to climb out. She escaped from the well, and killed the shogun and his men.

Centuries later, in the mundy world, Rapunzel and Joel Crow venture with Jack Horner (before his break with Rose Red) to Japan, where the Japanese Fables have started a new life after the Adversary's invasion. Rapunzel is caught in a war between Tomoko's group and the other Japanese Fables, but eventually manages to help her former lover and the Japanese Fables find their way back to their homeland via a magical portal. Frau Totenkinder reveals to Joel Crow that she knows who took Rapunzel's children, and that this person is an enemy of Totenkinder, who would use Rapunzel to bring her and all of Fabletown down. This is why the twins were stolen, and why she can't tell Rapunzel. She persuades Joel to give Rapunzel a memory potion that will make her forget about her daughters, Tomoko and The Hidden Kingdom. It is implied that Joel gives the potion to Rapunzel.

=== Kay ===
Once a captive of the Snow Queen, Kay is now grown and living in New York, away from Fabletown itself. It has never been stated what happened to his friend Gerda or their home. He still has the troll mirror shards in his eye, with the result that he sees all the bad that people have ever done. The pain that this causes him leads him to routinely gouge out his own eyes, although they grow back over a period of around ten years. Kay has proven very useful in the past at detecting traitors, and it is with this in mind that Beast asked Frau Totenkinder to magically restore Kay's sight to assist him in rooting out Fables who might be secretly working for the Adversary. Because of his ability, Kay is the only other person in Fabletown to know the full details of Bigby's past deeds and how Frau Totenkinder truly gets her powers. The "bad" he sees is defined so by Fabletown morals and not by Mundy justice, as he sees the "bad" in Bigby and in Frau Totenkinder. After seeing the evil in The Adversary, he is so overwhelmed he gouges his eyes out again. Soon afterward, he is killed by Mr. Dark, who devours his teeth to make him a witherling.

=== Mrs. Sprat ===
Mrs. Sprat, whose first name is Leigh, works as a nurse in the Knights of Malta Hospital special research wing and like the poem says, she is indeed fat. Sprat is a rather ugly and grumpy individual, which does her no good in a community filled with beautiful men and women. Her husband was another of Ghost's victims. In Fables #100, Snow White scolds her for her nasty, spiteful attitude towards Sheriff Beast and Beauty while the latter is going into labor. Snow explains that, while one can get away with being mean if she is beautiful, one can also get away with being hideous if she's pleasant, and since Sprat is both ugly and mean she will have to do something about her attitude before someone has had enough of her. On the verge of tears, Sprat reveals that she hates all the beautiful Fables, and became a nurse for the chance to have them under her care and at her mercy. When the Fables depart for Haven, Sprat stays behind, unbeknownst to everyone else. When Mister Dark shows up at the Farm looking for the other Fables, she offers to reveal their location for three things: to become beautiful, for all the other beautiful Fables to become ugly like her, and for a prince to love her with "true love". Mister Dark agrees to all three conditions, and the two depart together.

Mr. Dark shows Nurse Sprat how to make herself beautiful by exercising and fighting her eating disorder by eating more lean and less fat. Sprat is delighted with the great progress, but eventually becomes impatient with her transformation and asks Dark to speed up the process. Using an extremely painful spell, Dark transforms her into a beautiful, young woman in a black dress. Dark leaves to deal with the Fables, and promises to summon Sprat to his side so that she will see the beautiful Fables be made ugly before they die. He also plans to make her his bride and the mistress of Castle Dark, his fortress in New York City. Sprat adopts her maiden name, Duglas, since the name Sprat is from a dead past, but Dark is killed by Mr. North, the North Wind, before any of his plans are carried through. When Sprat's fellow Fables come to claim the castle as their own following Dark's death, Sprat dresses in rags and hides in a dungeon, pretending to have been Dark's prisoner, and claims that the reason for her slim figure is that Dark starved her. Since her transformation, she has tried gaining favor with King Cole and has been approached romantically by Dr. Swineheart, much to her shock. It is recently revealed that she withheld the last shard from Bigby after he had been turned into glass and shattered by Brandish. Now ready to take on the mantle of Mister Dark, she resurrects Bigby in a feral form and unleashes him onto the Fables. When the Fables demand Bigby's death, Sprat vehemently accuses the Fables of lacking mercy, especially Rose Red as the supposed champion for the hope of second chances. Enhanced by the magic as the leader of the Knights of the Endless Table, Rose eventually sees Sprat's true form and notices her glass ring, made from Bigby's shard. Killing Sprat, Rose Red takes the ring and assumes control over Bigby.

=== "The Cubs" ===
From left to right: Winter, Conner, Therese, Darien, Ambrose, and Blossom.

Snow and Bigby's seven children are a rowdy, unpredictable bunch of hybrids that seem to have inherited abilities from all facets of their heritage. All, but Ghost, can fly, at first uncontrollably so, flight having been their natural state; they needed to be taught how to ground themselves. They can transform into wolf form.

One of the seven, later named Ghost by Bigby, is a zephyr, a rogue wind whose invisible nature meant his parents were initially unaware of his existence. This entity fed off the air of living beings, accidentally killing them before he learned control. Snow White, after a rash of deaths, discovers that they were inadvertently caused by her last child. She sends Ghost to find his self-exiled father. The family has since been reunited. On their fifth birthday, the other six cubs were introduced to Ghost, but were sworn to secrecy as to his existence, as zephyrs are considered dangerous aberrations, and their grandfather Mr. North is obligated by a prior vow to exterminate any zephyrs known to exist. Ghost appears sweet, if anything confused since he cannot feel normal things the others do. He's not hungry, thirsty or sleepy, but he is good at finding people, which was what convinced Snow to find Bigby.

Ambrose, the chubby and sweet cub named after Flycatcher, is portrayed as the weak link, often too scared to transform or fly when in danger. Ambrose narrates certain events such as the family's trip to his grandfather's castle, as well as his narrow escape from his six wild uncles, with whom his father later fought. These are done in the form of memoirs.

Darien is shown as the leader of the pack, something that Bigby has commented on. Another female cub, Winter (named after Bigby's mother), is portrayed as being shy and cuddly, often shown sucking her thumb or holding a stuffed animal, usually the only one of the cubs to do so. Her brother Darien has referred to Winter as the runt of the litter, despite her being the firstborn. She also stands out because, unlike her other siblings, she was the only one who was born completely human in appearance. The remaining cubs are Conner, who is not too different from Darien in personality and possesses similar facial characteristics like Prince Charming; Therese, a blonde-headed cub who is observant, but tends to confuse things; and Blossom, who bears a great deal of resemblance to Rose Red, seems to have inherited some stereotypical "Fairytale Princess" qualities, and is often seen with cute cuddly forest creatures and butterflies following her around.

During the Fables Forum panel in the 2009 San Diego Comic Con, a one-page story was handed out to attendees that would foretell the fate of the cubs possibly within the next one hundred issues. Ambrose meets one of the Thirteenth Floor Witches, Ozma of Oz, the young childlike second in command to Frau Totenkinder, who at his behest tells him of a prophecy she had. She explains:

- The first child will be a king (Winter).
- The second child a pauper (Blossom).
- The third will do an evil thing (Therese).
- The fourth will die to stop her (Darien).
- The fifth will be a hero bold (Conner).
- The sixth will judge the rest (Ambrose).
- The seventh lives to ages old, and is by heaven blessed (Ghost).

The Witch further explains that her vision made no real detailed specifics as to which child is which and she leaves it up to Ambrose to decide if he should tell the others.

When the Cubs approach their ninth birthday, and the first result of the prophecy is revealed. After the death of the North Wind, Bigby's father, a successor is chosen among his grandchildren. After a series of tests are performed, Winter is named the winner and the new king of the North Wind's kingdom. Winter will be sent away soon for her training, but she admits to her father that she is deathly afraid as a result of recently having nightmares of her older self as the North Wind. In her dreams, she is no longer her sweet and shy self and sees herself as a cold and selfish person that hurts people. If this will happen is not known. By the time the events of Camelot occur, it is revealed that Winter has fully assumed the powers of the North Wind, including the ability to appear in multiple places at once wherever the North Wind exists. While she takes on the form of a young girl to keep her mother from worrying, Winter actually possesses an adult form reflecting her age and knowledge inherited from her predecessors and is considerably more ruthless than her childlike form appears. Unbeknownst to Snow White, Winter has taken it upon herself to gather all the powers under her demesnes, including the other cardinal winds, the Snow Queen, and Santa Claus, as part of an army against the forces of Rose Red and the Knights of the Endless Table.

Subsequently, the third and fourth children mentioned in the prophecy are revealed to be Therese and Darien respectively. After receiving a red plastic tugboat (Mr. Steampuddle) for Christmas from an unknown admirer, Therese is carried away to Toyland, a mysterious land where discarded toys go, and is delighted to be crowned Queen of Toyland. Dismayed when she finds she cannot fly nor go home, she begins to starve as nothing grows in Toyland and learns that all the inhabitants in Toyland are toys that caused their child owners to die in accidents, such as choking or drowning, and she is the latest in a long-line of ill-fated children who starved to death before they could restore the toys. Back in the "mundy" world, Darien realizes that as the pack leader, it is his job to look after the rest of the cubs. With the help of Lord Mountbatten, a magical clockwork tiger capable of taking physical form, he travels to Toyland to rescue his sister, but the toy army attack them, injure Darien, and take Mountbatten prisoner. Therese, with her diminishing condition and the dark influence of the land, orders Mountbatten to be killed for her sustenance, savagely eating his raw flesh before ordering toys to be burned in order to cook her meal, thus committing the "evil thing" outlined in the prophecy. To save his sister, Darien realizes he must sacrifice himself, and impales himself on a broken mini pool cue. His blood goes into a magical cauldron and his body goes into the soil; because of Darien's magical bloodline, his blood invokes an ancient magic that allows growth to come to Toyland and restores the cauldron so it magically fills up with hot and fresh food every day. Therese grieves over her brother for a long, long time and, upon maturity, decides to put her brother's sacrifice to work and begins the restoration of Toyland. Forcing everyone to accept that they are killers including herself, she commands Mr. Steampuddle to lead a series of new voyages and for the toys to save lives. Over many years, the toys are gradually restored and Therese returns to the mundy world to inform her family of Darien's fate. However, while she has grown, little time has passed and her siblings are all still children. Therese also reveals that she is tied to Toyland as its queen due to the consequences of her actions and must eventually return.

The sixth child of the prophecy is revealed to be Ambrose, reinforced by his response to Therese's story as the "one who will judge the rest" through his role as a historian for the Fables. In the Fables story The Destiny Game, an adult Ambrose appears to be in a well-established relationship with the Lady of the Lake. In that story, it is also revealed that, no matter their nigh-immortality (due to their nature as Fables and part-gods), they will all die, eventually (as Bigby is fated to outlive them all). Still according to Bigby's new fate, all of his cubs will lay waste to worlds (meaning they will all do terrible things, eventually - though this is contradicted by Dare's noble suicide before he had any opportunity to commit any crime of any kind at all), but as noted earlier, the Lady can reassign fates. In the Fables story Snow White, the adult Ambrose narrates the events that led to Bigby's death, and reveals he is the child who judges the rest as the witch foretold, by telling the histories. Ambrose himself is eventually revealed to be an established author of popular children's books and histories, as well as having six children with the Lady of the Lake.

The remaining portions of the prophecy are confirmed in the last volume of the series, Farewell. Blossom becomes the "pauper", a huntress who lives without material possessions or comforts, living off and protecting beasts and lands, which is a point of contention between her and Winter; Conner is the "hero bold", a swash-bucking adventurer who travels through worlds, though his flamboyant attitude has put him at odds with the more grounded Ambrose; and Ghost is revealed to be the one "who lives to ages old, and is by heaven blessed" by virtue of outliving all his siblings after a long eventful life.

=== Other New York Fables ===
- The Forsworn Knight: A human figure in full medieval armor, the Knight hangs from a noose tied to the tree in the Fabletown business office in the early issues of Fables. All that was known about him was that he had apparently killed himself sometime in the 13th century and that, when plied with alcohol, he is prone to singing and uttering prophecies. In The Good Prince story arc, it is revealed that the Forsworn Knight is the ghost of Lancelot, who has pledged his service to Flycatcher, as well as knighted Ambrose to become the Once and Future King.
- Cock Robin: He is one of the message birds used by the Fabletown authorities to communicate with The Farm whenever The Farm's phone lines are down. He is killed by another bird fable during the Farm revolt.
- Jack Ketch: The executioner who killed Dun and Posey Pig after the revolution at the Farm, he is named after the infamous executioner. According to Bill Willingham, Jack Ketch in Fables is an office, and not a single person.
- Edmond Dantès: Better known as 'The Count of Monte Cristo', Dantès owns and runs Fabletown's Chateau d'If Fencing Academy. He can often be found in the Branstock Tavern. He is killed by Goldilocks in the Fairest graphic novel Fairest In All the Land, during a fencing lesson with Snow White, who was Goldilocks' intended victim. Although Snow is resurrected by Cinderella, Dantès is not, as Cindy can only resurrect half of Goldilock's victims.
- Crow brothers: Joel, Vulco, and Ephram Crow are the three survivors of the original twelve brothers. The brothers, warriors all, fought fiercely against the Adversary's forces and the Crows were instrumental in ensuring the escape of the last ship to leave the Homelands, as the then-surviving seven, armed only with daggers, took on and defeated a pair of dragons who were threatening the fleeing vessel, at the cost of four of their number. These days, Joel's sole task is to cut Rapunzel's hair three times a day, Ephram works as a security guard at the Knights of Malta hospital and Vulco runs the I Am the Eggman diner. The three Crows were brought in to assist with the arrest of the visiting Arabian Fables. Vulco is known to date Clara, the former dragon turned bird, in his bird form; as well as a fair maiden named Katrinelje while he is in human form.
- The Magical Mirror: Served as an adviser to Bufkin while the latter was stranded in the business office. Other people who have asked the mirror questions are Flycatcher, Prince Charming and Jack Horner. In the Witches story arc, the mirror is also identified as the mirror from the tale of The Snow Queen.
- Thrushbeard: Still as hirsute as his name suggests, Thrushbeard apparently managed to escape the Homelands with some of his royal fortune, as observed by Jack when he tried to sell the exiled King the magic beans; Thrushbeard, wise to Jack's ways, wanted nothing to do with it. He can often be found drinking in the Branstock Tavern. Whether his wife escaped the Homelands with him is unknown.
- The Boy Who Cried Wolf: He is referred to in the March of the Wooden Soldiers story arc. When Snow White does not believe Jack Horner's story about The Wooden Soldiers, Snow asks if he did ever hear about the Boy Who Cried Wolf; Jack replies that he lives on the seventh floor of the Woodland building.
- Little Miss Muffet and the spider: Now apparently married to the spider and calling herself Mrs. Web, she is Fabletown's biggest gossip. Her husband, the Spider, was one of the victims of Snow's son Ghost. He was later among the ghosts who went with Flycatcher to Haven.
- Frankenstein's monster: Frankenstein was animated by Nazis during World War II. Bigby fought the monster (in a reference to the 1943 film Frankenstein Meets the Wolf Man) when he and a squad of Allied soldiers stormed the castle where the experiment was being performed. The Monster's still-animated head is kept in the business office in the Woodlands building where Bigby chats with him from time to time. He often has phantom thirst and is given drinks by Bufkin though the last time this happened, the bottom of his cage rusted out. He is Bufkin's dear friend and ally, he teams up with Bufkin and the others when they discover they're stuck with Baba Yaga. In the March of the Wooden Soldiers story arc, Pinocchio can be seen reading the Frankenstein novel, establishing its existence in the Mundane world of the series; it has yet to be clarified whether the Monster is a true Fable (i.e., a migrant from a Homeland where the events of the novel occurred) or a rare case of a non-Fable paranormal native to the Mundane.
- The Goose That Laid the Golden Eggs: Believed killed in the Adversary's assault on the Homelands, Gudrun actually escaped and now lives in a secret den within the Woodlands building. Her eggs provided Bigby with an untraceable source of funds for his covert activities. With Bigby moved on, Gudrun now fulfills the same role for his replacement, Beast.
- Shylock: In The Mean Seasons, Bigby talks about a man who converts the Goose's eggs into currency. Bill Willingham has identified the person as Shylock, the central character from The Merchant of Venice. It seems that Shylock still works with money in some unspecified manner.
- Jack Sprat: Killed off-screen by Ghost during The Mean Seasons story arc, he is also mentioned in the Jack of Fables story Jack O' Lantern.
- Barbara Allen: Referred to in the story arcs The Mean Seasons and Rose Red, she is the character of a folk song. She was accidentally killed by Ghost.
- Hakim: A newly freed Arabian slave, he has had trouble adjusting to modern-day New York. He became the bodyguard to Briar Rose when she agreed to use her curse to disable the Empire's capital city. Years later, he was still asleep together with Mrs. Someone, who acted as Briar Rose's magical guardian. Recently, the sleeping Briar Rose was carried out of the city by goblins, before the city was burned to the ground, and it is assumed that Mrs. Someone and Hakim were killed in the fire.
- The Butcher, the Baker and the Candlestick-Maker: They appear in Happily Ever After and The Great Fables Crossover. Jack Horner, having met the revised version of the trio at the Golden Boughs Retirement Village, claims that they are spies of Mr. Revise and not the real ones. When he orders the other Fables to arrest them, the Baker runs for his life.
- Bean Nighe: She was first referred to in a map of Fabletown, printed in the Wolves trade paperback, which says that Ford Laundry is run by "the washer woman at the Ford". She makes her first appearance in the Fairest graphic novel Fairest In All the Land, which reveals that Bean Nighe has the ability to predict the deaths of other people. In this story, Bean Nighe, along with Morgan le Fay, were victims at the hands of Goldilocks. Cinderella is able to bring back the victims of Goldilocks, but she's only allowed to choose half, and chooses Morgan Le Fay, seeing her more valuable an alley for Fabletown.
- Fair Katrinelje: She is dating Vulco Crow when he is human.
- S.O.S.: The Society of Seconds, a faction composed of Fables who were born in the Mundy world, most likely from before the Pied Piper's Curse. They want to go back, and establish a country in one of the now liberated Homelands.
- Seamus McGuire, a member of Boy Blue's band who plays the harp. He is referred to in Peter & Max: A Fables Novel, and can be seen with the band in the Fables story "All in a Single Night".
- Baby Joe Sheppard, a member of Boy Blue's band who plays the drums. He is referred to in Peter & Max: A Fables Novel, and can be seen with members of the band in the Fables stories Single Combat and "All in a Single Night".
- Crispin Cordwainer: The famous shoemaker of The Elves and the Shoemaker, named for St. Crispin, the patron of cobblers, he runs the Glass Slipper while Cinderella is off doing her spy work. The elves still have a working relationship with him, though their magic gifts come with unexpected side effects. This is seen in Cinderella: From Fabletown with Love while Cindy goes on another mission (though she told him it was a business trip) and he decides to run the shop on his way. He convinces the elves to make magic shoes for the Fabletown women, such as jogging shoes that jog for woman, but despite their warning, he gets what he wants. It comes with a side effect, as the women (like Rapunzel who bought jogging shoes) cannot take the shoes off and it is exhausting them. This causes the angry women to organize a protest where mundys can see, which puts Crispin in trouble with Sheriff Beast. Eventually, when Cindy returns, she makes the elves take back the shoes (though Cindy must pay them for their efforts, but she takes it out of Crispin's paycheck). She also makes Crispin give all the Fabletown women long foot massages for their tired feet. The elves decide to send their shoes back to the Homelands for the soldiers that served the "Emperor".
- The huntsman: From the Snow White fairytale, he first appears in flashbacks during the Rose Red and Camelot story arcs, playing the same role as he does in the fairy tale. In the Fairest story arc Of Men and Mice, it is established that he is a resident of Fabletown. It is implied that he and Crispin are close friends; when Crispin is in a coma after a bomb attack meant for Cinderella, the huntsman remains at Crispin's bedside for days.

== Thirteenth Floor Fables ==
These are the spellcaster Fables who live on the 13th floor of the Woodlands building.

=== Frau Totenkinder ===
Frau Totenkinder (a pseudonym which literally translates as "dead children" in German) is the leader of the magicians of Fabletown, representing many of the unnamed witches found in tales and legends. Her outward appearance as a rather frail old woman masks the fact that she is one of the most powerful Fables to have escaped the Homelands. She has appeared throughout the series as an integral part of the Fabletown community, both defending it against the Adversary's mages and making her own deals with its residents.

=== Ozma ===
Ozma, Princess of Oz, is a little girl witch who is often seen with Frau Totenkinder. While the Fairy Witch's great task was the creation of Fabletown and the Woodland building and Totenkinder's great task was the battle against the Empire, Ozma sees her task as the battle against Mr. Dark for the sake of Fabletown. She was voted as the new leader of the 13th floor after Frau Totenkinder went to find Dunster Happ. She participated in a power struggle in The Farm along with Stinky and Gepetto, and in the end was named one of Rose Red's three advisers. With Totenkinder gone to live with her new husband, Ozma is the leader of the thirteenth floor witches. She is killed by a resurrected feral Bigby Wolf.

=== Great Fairy Witch ===
The former leader of the 13th floor who has gone a little crazy, she is the witch from Thumbelina, as seen in flashbacks in the Fables story The Barleycorn Brides. It is hinted that Frau Totenkinder was the one who caused her to go mad after she took over the Fairy Witch's role. When Totenkinder gave her knitting needles and her bag of wool balls their true forms and names back and stopped knitting, the Great Fairy Witch continued to knit with no needles and no wool. She has gone by other names including Ardelia, Cherish, Birdie and Bulah.

=== Maddy ===
A black cat with a demon-like, pointed tail who has appeared in a few panels with Frau Totenkinder and other witches, she is the acknowledged specialist in matters of locating and hiding and is a shape-shifter. Her powers at hiding are so great that Mr. Dark could not detect her, when she went to spy on him, although she had trouble keeping away from his detection, calling Mr. Dark the most paranoid and dangerous of any subject she had spied on before. Ozma used her to find Frau Totenkinder before she went into seclusion. The character has been revealed to represent both Sycorax from The Tempest and Medea from Greek mythology. Maddy seems to be second in command to Ozma, the same way that Ozma herself was always second to Totenkinder.

=== Mr. Grandours ===
Mr. Grandours (in French, literally "large bear") is the title character from the French fairy tale The Wizard King (from Andrew Lang's The Yellow Fairy Book), about a shapeshifting wizard king; this is revealed in the Fables Encyclopedia.

The local Imperial Governor instructed Mr. Grandours to guard a tower, filled with various treasures, including the magic barleycorns. He helped John Barleycorn and Arrow retrieve the jar and joined Fabletown. He eventually returned to his human form and lives on the 13th floor. He is the man in a big fur coat and hat with bear eyes. He was the one that originally revived Boy Blue and Bigby Wolf when they were almost killed by a magic arrow.

=== Mrs. Someone ===
A witch who stayed with Briar Rose and Hakim during the takeover of Calabri Anagni, the Imperial capital of the Fable Homelands. Her true name is still unknown as she keeps it a secret "tucked away where no fell power can discern it". Mrs. Someone and Hakim chose to stay with Briar Rose until the end and fell under Briar's sleeping spell. Recently, the sleeping Briar Rose was carried out of the city by goblins, before the city was burned to the ground, and it is assumed that Mrs. Someone and Hakim were killed in the fire.

=== Prospero ===
The protagonist of William Shakespeare's play The Tempest, Prospero is seen agreeing with Mr. Grandours that haste is a "mundy quality". It is unknown how the relation between Prospero and Maddy is, as he used her son as a slave for years, but this would fall under the Fabletown Compact which pardons any crimes done before signing.

=== Mr. Kadabra ===
Mr. Kadabra is a stereotypical Stage Magician wearing a top hat. In earlier appearances, he is seen wearing a button with "yog" on it which refers to meditation and concentration. His name derives from the magic phrase abracadabra. He was killed by an unknown assailant in the first issue of Cinderella: Fables Are Forever. In the Fables story In Those Days, it is revealed that Mr. Kadabra's real name is Karrant. Karrant was a powerful sorcerer who cast a spell on the Adversary that made the Adversary ignore any land in which Kadabra dwelled. The cost of Karrant's actions was that he forgot all about the spell and his enemy. He wandered from world to world until he ended up in Fabletown in the mundane world, where he made a living as a stage magician, adopting the stage name "Master Kadabra". He was eventually killed by Dorothy Gale, who needed a dead body to send a message to her archenemy, Cinderella.

=== Morgan le Fay ===
Morgan le Fay, from the saga of King Arthur, is the witch with the long dark hair and beauty mark on her face. Her identity was first revealed in the Fairest graphic novel Fairest In All the Land, and later in Fables #136 (Camelot, Part 6). She is also known as Mrs. Green, as revealed in Fables #128 (Snow White, Chapter Four). Morgan was part of Ozma's super team put together to defeat Mister Dark, where she was given the "superhero name" The Green Witch. She has the power to fly.

In the Snow White story arc, after the story arc's title character is taken captive by Prince Brandish, Morgan is seen discussing rescue plans with her fellow witches, Ozma and Maddy. Because Brandish has bewitched himself so that any injury inflicted on him will also hurt Snow, the task is easier said than done, especially since the spell is difficult to break. Morgan comes up with a plan. They will not try to break the spell, but add to it instead: She will build in a delay between cause and effect, which will give them some wiggle room between the moment Brandish is killed, and when the same thing happens to Snow. Morgan begins the hard work of casting the spell, while Rose Red rescues Snow while Brandish is distracted. Snow then engages Brandish in a sword fight, while Morgan slowly, but carefully manages to unwind the spell that Brandish has cast on himself, allowing Snow to stab him straight through his heart.

The spell however is not broken, but merely delayed. In the Camelot story arc, Morgan breaks the bad news to Snow: sooner or later, the fatal wound is bound to be inflicted on Snow herself, which will kill her. In Fairest In All the Land, Morgan, along with Bean Nighe, a Fabled oracle, were victims at the hands of Goldilocks. While Cinderella is able to bring back the victims of Goldilocks, she is only allowed to choose half. She ultimately chooses Morgan Le Fay, seeing her more valuable an alley for Fabletown. Snow White's fate is resolved in the same story; she is stabbed through the heart (as Morgan predicted) by Goldilocks, but Cinderella is able to bring her back to life.

== The Farm ==
This is a list of fictional characters in the Vertigo comic book series Fables, Jack of Fables, Cinderella: From Fabletown with Love, Cinderella: Fables Are Forever and Fairest, published by DC Comics. These are the characters who live at The Farm.

=== Rose Red ===
Rose Red is Snow White's sister, ex-girlfriend of Jack Horner, brief fiancée of Bluebeard, and brief wife of Sinbad. For centuries, Rose's relationship with her sister was defined by wild carousing and partying, serving as an embarrassment to her sister. Snow's then-husband Prince Charming got tangled with Rose Red in an adulterous relationship when she had stayed with the couple as Snow White's companion, thus putting an end to the already troubled marriage. In the first Fables story arc, she is believed to be murdered, until Bigby Wolf solves the mystery: she and Jack had faked her death as part of a complex plan to avoid her impending marriage to Bluebeard after using a great deal of his money to finance one of Jack's ill-fated get-rich-quick schemes.

In the second story arc, she and Snow White go up to the Farm for Rose to do as punishment for her faked death, where they are caught up in a revolution. At the end of that story, Rose finally finds her niche, managing the Farm, which allowed her to stand equal to her sister, the then-deputy mayor. At the end of the arc Rose is shown to have matured greatly and has fixed her relationship with her sister and broke off her bad relationship with Jack for good. She continues to run the Farm, doting on her nieces and nephews, and has occasionally provided assistance to covert operations. Though her life as the original party girl is well behind her, she still maintains a cheerful attitude and independent spirit, evident in how she runs the Farm, regardless of how the current administration would like her to manage things.

She was briefly involved with Weyland Smith before his death in the battle of Fabletown. Rose was also the one who persuaded her sister to trust Frau Totenkinder and take her with them to the mundane world while they were escaping from the Homelands and the invading armies of the Adversary. She had shown interest in Boy Blue while overseeing his labor sentence, but rejected his advances on the eve of Fabletown's strike against the Emperor in order to preserve their friendship. Boy Blue did not take the rejection well. Following the "War and Pieces" story arc, Rose marries Sinbad, but immediately divorces him on account of her despair over Boy Blue's post-war condition. She attempts to revive her romantic relationship with Boy Blue in his last moments, but is denied by Blue himself, who tells her that she is hopelessly attracted to whoever seems to add the most excitement to her life, and that he deserves better than that, but he hopes someone else can "fix her".

Emotionally destroyed by Blue's rejection and death, Rose descends into self-loathing and depression, refusing to leave her bed for any reason. She reunites briefly with Jack on her descent toward rock-bottom, believing that she deserves someone as terrible as Jack. After reconciling with her past, Rose decides to take charge of the Farm again, stopping Ozma, Brock, and Geppetto's bids to take control of the farm and appointing them as her advisers. She also makes it clear to Cole, Beast, and Beauty that she will accept their advice but wants them to respect the fact that they're on the Farm and not at Fabletown. To show no hard feelings with Brock, she wears a blue scarf to show her support that Boy Blue could come back, but maintains that while she wants as much as anyone for Blue to come back, it is the job of everyone to fix their own problems instead of waiting for Blue to return and fix everything. While it has not been said, Rose does feel guilty for divorcing her husband, as Colin points out to her in a dream, by asking what she felt guilty about.

=== Weyland Smith ===
Based on Wayland the Smith, a figure in Germanic mythology, Weyland Smith served as the administrator of the Farm facility and thus bore the brunt of much of the resentment of those Fables confined there. He was imprisoned during the revolution there and was magically compelled to turn his mechanical prowess to the task of adapting mundane weapons so that they could be used easily by non-human Fables. Once the rebellion was foiled, he was replaced as administrator by Rose Red. He then intended to leave the Farm, but Snow White asked him to stay on and continue the task of adapting weapons, in preparation for the inevitable conflict with the Adversary. He agreed and stayed at the Farm, and became close with Rose, shortly before they were called into action to defend Fabletown against the incursion of the wooden soldiers. He fought bravely, smashing the enemy close up with his massive mallet, but ultimately fell in battle alongside many of his compatriots, his body committed to the witching well. He was eventually resurrected by Flycatcher and was tasked with building farms and other medieval era infrastructure for Fly's kingdom of Haven. He now holds a position of distinction as Haven's Chief Builder in service to King Ambrose. He's later murdered by Prince Brandish, who takes the opportunity to retaliate in Rose Red's absence.

=== The Three (or Four) Little Pigs ===
The "original" Three Little Pigs, Dun, Posey and Colin were heavily involved in the revolt at the Farm. Colin, who appeared to be considerably less enthusiastic about the idea of rebellion than his cousins, was sent down to Fabletown to attempt to steal or duplicate a key to the main business office in the Woodlands building, and also to determine which of the city Fables might be sympathetic to their cause. Colin failed in these missions, largely because Bigby Wolf kept a close eye on him before sending him back to the Farm. For this failure, he was killed by the ringleaders of the rebellion (the implication is that Goldilocks did the actual deed) and his head put on a pole in the centre of the Farm as a message that it was time for the rebellion to begin. When it ultimately failed, Dun and Posey were tried as ringleaders and were beheaded for their crimes.

This posed something of a problem, as the Three Little Pigs is a popular myth and thus they were needed to fulfill their roles, but it also presented a solution to another problem. As part of Snow White's plan to stem the revolution, three Giant Fables, Lonny, Donny and Johnny, who had been kept sedated for centuries due to the impossibility of hiding their huge forms, had been awakened. Rose Red, in her new position as Farm administrator, persuaded her sister to authorize the expensive spells required to transform the three giants into pig forms, allowing the three to take up their new roles as the new Three Little Pigs.

The late Colin appeared to Snow White on four occasions after his murder, still appearing as a head on a pole (possibly in reference to the famous scene of Lord of the Flies). The first occasion was when she lay in a coma after being shot by Goldilocks, where they discussed death briefly and Colin pointed out that, while he was dead, she probably wasn't. The second was shortly before the assault on Fabletown by the wooden soldiers, giving her warning that bad things were coming that would require all of them to defeat. The third occasion was in a dream after her return to the Farm with her children, to warn her that things weren't going to improve any time soon. His final appearance was apparently while Snow was awake, to tell her that things were finally going to get better for her (unbeknownst to Snow, Bigby was on the way back) and to say goodbye, that she didn't need him anymore and that he should move on to whatever came next. Whether this was simply a function of Snow's unconscious mind or whether Colin's spirit survived his murder in some manner is unclear. The guiding spirit of Colin appeared again behind Santa Claus when Santa prophesied a coming battle to Flycatcher, and to Rose Red, warning her that she would have to lead Fabletown during the crisis of Mister Dark

In Jack of Fables, it was revealed that there was a fourth Little Pig, Carl, who made a house out of cloth. He was Snow White's "favourite of The Four Little Pigs", prior to being eliminated from the story by Mr. Revise before he could find out what happened to his brothers—temporarily making Colin Snow White's "favourite of The Three Little Pigs".

Since Fables: Rose Red, it is revealed that the spiritual guide they thought was Colin Pig may not be him after all, during Colin's final attempt to help Rose Red from her depression. He soon transforms into Boy Blue, but immediately decides to change again, believing it would be too cruel for her. Instead, he takes the form of Rose and Snow White's mother. It is also noted that the spirit knows things about Rose and Snow that they had never told others, such as their child pet names, and he explains that their mother and the king (from Snow White and Rose Red), the father of Prince Brandish, were the ones behind Snow's separation from her family. When Rose realizes that Snow is not to blame for all her grief and that she needs to move on, she looks to her "mother's" spirit and tells her to stop trying to fool her. At this point she sees that this being is neither Boy Blue, Colin, nor her mother, and asks it to show her its real form, to which request it complies. Although its form is never seen, Rose is shown bathed in a golden light, and it is seen that this form impresses and shocks her.

The final issue of the Super Team story arc reveals that the mysterious being is Hope, from the story of Pandora and Pandora's box. She was previously seen in her true form in an illustration for the Rose Red story arc, where she is described as one of the great powers and belonging to the same group as Mr. Dark and The North Wind.

Colin appeared in a video game The Wolf Among Us, as a prequel to the comics. He is seen hanging around Bigby's apartment, and Bigby must choose whether to let him stay or send him back to the farm. He is voiced by Brian Sommer.

=== The Three Bears ===
Residents at the Farm due to their non-human appearance, the Three Bears got involved with the rebellion there, largely manipulated by Goldilocks, who was sleeping with Boo, the now-grown Baby Bear. After the revolt failed, the three were sentenced to one hundred years of hard labor. Some time later, when it became apparent that Fabletown would soon fall under attack, the three volunteered to join the defense, hoping to demonstrate their new loyalty. They fought bravely, but Papa Bear was badly injured and Boo was slain by enemy fire in the closing stages of the battle. Boo's body was committed to the depths of the Witching Well along with his fallen comrades, watched by his grieving parents. With the popular story requiring three bears, Mama Bear became pregnant not long after her son's death and a new Baby Bear now completes the family once more.

=== Reynard the Fox ===
Reynard the Fox is a resident of the farm who stayed loyal during Goldilocks's revolution. He is a trickster, and a rogue, but also cunning and brave, a characteristic that makes him similar to Charming and Jack Horner as the three are depicted as a stereotype of lovable rogue. He often puts himself at risk for just causes, when he isn't driving his fellow animals crazy with his tricks. He helped Snow White escape the clutches of The Three Pigs and helped her defeat Shere Khan and free Weyland Smith from his bonds. He flirts with Snow White shamelessly, who is, in turn, is playfully appalled by the fox's advances. During preparations for Bigby and Snow's home, Reynard tells Prince Charming that he blames him. When he asks why, Reynard explains if Prince Charming had kept his promise for glamour spells, he could have become a human and swept Snow off her feet. Charming, not wanting to be reminded of his broken promises, tells him to leave him alone. In the Homelands, he was the one who led King Noble the Lion's subjects (a large number of anthropomorphic animals) into the Mundy world, enabling them to escape the slavery of the Adversary's army. He did this despite the fact that, as a trickster, he was disliked by most of his neighbors. In a display of power, Ozma bestowed the ability to shapeshift between fox and human forms, and his human form is apparently very attractive. Currently, he is amusing himself by transforming back and forth and is very excited to be off the farm. He eventually becomes one of the Knights of Rose Red's New Camelot.

=== Brock Blueheart ("Stinky") ===
A badger who may or may not be the same character as Mr. Badger from The Wind in the Willows (who appears in the Fables graphic novel 1001 Nights of Snowfall). Though he is usually referred to as "Stinky", he specifically stated on several occasions that it is not his real name. The others agree to use the new name. After Blue's death, Brock starts a religion based on pure delusion. A belief the returning Jack of Fables is Blue is found false and Brock turns on Jack and Rose. She is hidden away from and Jack is ejected from farm territory. During the Rose Red story arc, Brock meets clandestinely with Ozma and Gepetto to discuss the future of the leadership of the Farm in Rose Red's absence. When Rose clarifies her leadership, Brock backs her. Due to Brock's belief in Blue, he is able to manifest a more powerful form at times, but magic based on beliefs and religion is extremely weak and easily destroyed by proper magic, as revealed during a skirmish.

=== Peter Piper ===
From the famous tongue twister Peter Piper Picked a Peck of Pickled Pepper, the nursery rhyme Peter Peter Pumpkin Eater, and the tale of Peter and the Wolf, Peter was first mentioned in part 2 of The Ballad of Rodney and June, and went on to become one of the title characters in Peter & Max: A Fables Novel. He is the younger brother to Max, The Pied Piper of Hamelin. When the adversary invaded Peter's Fable Homeland of Hesse, he was forced to make a living as a thief in the homelands version of Hamelin. He and his wife, Bo Peep, eventually managed to escape to Fabletown and the mundane world, where they settled in on the Farm. Peter is a flutist, and the holder to the magic flute Frost, and he is also in Boy Blue's band. In addition to his main appearance in Peter & Max, he also appears in several issues of the Fables comic: in Fables #91 (chapter five of the Witches story arc), Peter and his wife can be seen among the Fables standing in the background when the dryads are enjoying the falling snow. He can be seen playing his flute alongside another member of the band while the Fables are partying in Fables #100. He appears with his wife and his band in the Fables Christmas story "All in a Single Night".

Peter and his wife have their first speaking parts (in the comics) in Fables #127 (chapter three of the Snow White story arc), where they partake in the plans to rescue Snow White from Prince Brandish. They also appear as supporting characters in the Fairest story Aldered States, where Peter and his wife have become friends with Princess Alder the dryad. When Reynard the Fox - in human form - asks the dryad out, Peter gives the fox advice on the customs of dating and courtship.

In the Camelot story arc, Peter is one of the candidates for a seat at Rose Red's new Round Table, but Peter says no, because he's already had more than his share of adventures.

In the Fairest graphic novel Fairest In All the Land, Peter is almost killed by Goldilocks. The latter is out to murder the beautiful women of Fabletown, and goes after Peter's wife in their home, but Bo catches her by surprise, and Goldilocks flees the scene of the crime.

=== Bo Peep ===
From the nursery rhyme Little Bo Peep, and wife to Peter Piper, she is also the wife from the nursery rhyme Peter Peter Pumpkin Eater. She was crippled by a magic song from Max Piper's flute, Fire. After the death of Max, Peter used Fire to heal her, and then he turned Fire over to the authorities of Fabletown. In her youth, she was a member of the Assassin's Guild of the Homelands version of Hamlin. She likes to keep lambs. Bo is one of the supporting characters of Peter & Max: A Fables Novel, and is mentioned in the Super Team story arc. She and her husband make a brief appearance in Fables #91 (chapter five of the Witches story arc), where they can be seen among the Fables standing in the background when the dryads are enjoying the falling snow. They also appear briefly in the Fables story "All in a Single Night", celebrating Christmas with their fellow Fables. They have their first speaking parts (in the comics) in Fables #127 (chapter three of the Snow White story arc), where they partake in the plans to rescue Snow White from Prince Brandish. Bo and Peter both appear as supporting characters in the Fairest story Aldered States, where they have become friends with Princess Alder the dryad. Bo advises the dryad on the customs and mores of modern courtship.

In the Camelot story arc, Bo and her husband are among the candidates for Rose Red's new Round Table. Even though Peter says no, Bo decides to attempt to win a seat, and is ultimately chosen as one of Rose Red's Knights, who will take their place at the New Camelot.

In the Fairest graphic novel Fairest In All the Land, Bo is one of many Fables killed by Goldilocks, although Cinderella is able bring her back to life. Bo's husband, Peter, is also one of the intended victims, but Goldilocks is interrupted by Bo before she can go through with her plans. Because Goldilocks took Cinderella's form, Bo attacks the real Cinderella when the latter shows up at their house a moment later. She almost kills her in a knife fight, but Cinderella survives the deadly wounds, and is able to explain.

=== Other Farm characters ===
- Chicken Little: A Farm resident prone to panic attacks.
- Puss in Boots, or The Marquis De Carabas, an orange cat who plays the fiddle, he became a spy for Cindy in exchange that Cindy would someday help him reclaim his lost estates.
- Dickory, the Mouse who Ran up the Clock, appeared briefly in the Animal Farm story arc, before appearing in Cinderella: From Fabletown with Love and the Fairest story arc Of Men and Mice. He is one of Cindy's animal spies, and can make time around him move slower that he seems so fast that can move between the ticks of a clock.
- The Clock is seen during the Animal Farm story arc.
- Luna, The Cow who Jumped over the Moon is one of the Fables who managed to escape on the last boat out of the Homelands, and the only living member of the species Bovalunaris (an obvious combination of the words "bovine" and "lunar"). She was felled by arrows in the war between Fabletown and the Empire, but recovered.
- The Moon is much smaller and nearer than Earth's moon, explaining how the cow is able to leap over it. In the Fairest graphic novel Fairest in All the Land, it is revealed that the moon is female. She becomes the victim of a serial killer who is after the women of Fabletown.
- The Dish and the Spoon: The Dish is male, and the Spoon is female, according to 1001 Nights of Snowfall.
- The Cheshire Cat is briefly seen during the Animal Farm story arc and also mentioned in the Fables spin-off Cinderella: Fables Are Forever.
- Walrus from "The Walrus and the Carpenter" is identified in the Fables Encyclopedia annotations and makes an appearance in the Animal Farm story arc. A revised version of the character is a prisoner at the Golden Boughs Retirement Village.
- Br'er Rabbit, one of the "Br'er Group", actively sided with the revolutionaries during the Farm revolt.
- Br'er Bear: During the farm revolt, he led one of the teams hunting for Reynard the Fox.
- Br'er Gator: Never referred to by name, but has been identified by Bill Willingham as the bespectacled alligator seen in several stories. He is from the Joel Chandler Harris' stories of Uncle Remus, where he is referred to as "B'er Gater".
- White Rabbit
- The Three Blind Mice, Leland, Thaddeus and Prescott, are often out on their own adventures. When the Adversary invaded their homeland, they took part in an expedition to gather food for their beloved King, Old King Cole, who was near death from starvation. They succeeded, but were caught stealing by the farmer's wife, who cut off their tails with a carving knife.
- The Tortoise and the Hare: Jack Horner, having met the revised version of the duo at the Golden Boughs Retirement Village, claims that the Tortoise and the Hare at the Farm are not the real ones, but spies of Mr. Revise, to which the Hare replies, "What? I never!
- The Three Billy Goats Gruff: According to the novel Peter & Max, all three have the first name of William. In the graphic novel 1001 Nights of Snowfall, it is revealed that they were enchanted by Frau Totenkinder, in order to eliminate a bridge troll that was causing problems for a village that won her favor, back in the Homelands.
- The Owl and the Pussycat: The duo makes a brief appearance during the Animal Farm story arc. They have their first speaking role in the Fairest story arc Clamour for Glamours, where they listen to Reynard's tales of exploit from the human world.
- Animated playing cards from Alice in Wonderland.
- Flying monkeys are briefly seen during the Animal Farm story arc and the story Waiting for the Blues.
- Mr. Sunflower: Identified by name in the Wolves story arc, he resents being restricted to the Farm and often vocally agitates the community by taking on the grievances of other residents and vocally bringing them up, claiming unfair treatment, whenever he can. According to Fables artist Mark Buckingham, he is from the nursery rhyme "Mister Sunflower", from a Victorian book of nursery rhymes written and illustrated by artist R. Andre.
- Thumbelina: She moved to Smalltown during the 18th century and was the only woman there for a while, causing many fights over who would win her hand.
- Tom Thumb, who's been dating Thumbebelina and lives in his own miniature castle.
- Mr. Toad, Mr. Mole and Mr. Badger from The Wind in the Willows: Toad was one of the casualties in the war between Fabletown and the Empire, and was one of many who received a hero's burial. Mole actively sided with the revolutionaries during the Farm revolt. Badger appears in the graphic novel 1001 Nights of Snowfall.
- Red Cap the Troll is identified by name in the prose story Pinocchio's Army in the Rose Red trade paperback. He is the little goblin who appears in several stories, in which he is depicted with the taloned hands, red cap and iron-shod boots of a redcap.
- Bagheera, Shere Khan, Kaa, Baloo, and King Louie are characters from The Jungle Book. King Louie the orangutan was in Disney's adaptation, but did not appear in Kipling's original book. Fables author Bill Willingham admits he featured Louie in the comic book because he mistakenly believed Louie was from Kipling's book and was therefore public domain. They aided the revolution, and Khan was shot dead by Snow White. Baloo danced for a week on Khan's grave, doing a show everyday and a matinee on Sunday, and Bagheera urinated on it. Bagheera was the only revolutionary who chose confinement over hard labour. He was eventually freed after Mowgli, who owed Bagheera a life debt, took on his burden of service and brought the self-exiled Bigby Wolf back to Fabletown. Khan is shown to be one of the many whose bodies were dumped down the Witching Well which means he is among the Fables dwelling below the well. As a ghost, Khan returned to the Homelands and joined The Adversary. His fate after the war's end is unknown. Bagheera recently returned to his homeland with Mowgli and Bigby's brothers to see if they can safely move back in.
- King Noble: From the Reynard cycle, his lands were shown being taken in the graphic novel 1001 Nights of Snowfall. He was one of the few who sided with Snow White during the (attempted) Farm revolution.
- The Old Woman Who Lived In a Shoe: She and her children live in the Farm and were heavily armed during the Revolution. According to Peter & Max: A Fables Novel, she could choose to leave the Farm any time she wished, but not without her beloved shoe-house, so she chooses to stay where she is.
- Baba Yaga's cabin on chicken legs
- Clarathea ("Clara"), a dragon who, for practical purposes, chose to be transformed into a fire-breathing raven. She is Rose Red's friend and enforcer, and is dating Vulco Crow when he is in bird form.
- Johhny, Donny and Lonny, giants of renown, who were kept sedated for centuries due to the impossibility in hiding their huge forms. After they awoke, they agreed to be transformed into pig forms, allowing the three to take up their new roles as the new Three Little Pigs.
- Winnie the Pooh and Piglet make an appearance in Fables, albeit obscurely, since Winnie the Pooh was still under copyright at the time of the appearance in Fables, until the copyright expired in the United States (where Fables is published) at the start of 2022. In part five of the Animal Farm story arc, when the foiled revolution threatens to flare up again, the duo appears in two panels; from a distance when Boy Blue tells everyone to move back, and then from behind in the following panel. Also, in the Jack of Fables story Jack 'n' Apes, a character looking remarkably similar to Winnie the Pooh (but drawn slightly differently) can be seen in flashbacks from the Homelands, barbecuing marshmallows with Saunders in what appears to be the Hundred Acre Wood. Saunders was a sock monkey who was one of the "civilized apes" that Jack Horner met (at least according to Jack). In the works of author A. A. Milne, Sanders is the name of the person who resided at Pooh's home prior to Pooh making it his house, and Winnie the Pooh and several other characters from the books were based on the stuffed toys of Milne's son. In addition, it is implied that Fabletown's Edward Bear's Candy Shop, which specializes in honey-based treats, is run by Winnie the Pooh: Edward Bear is Winnie the Pooh's original name. In the Fables story Around the Town, Pinocchio says that he is not sure if a bear actually owns the shop, but if he does, he does it from a distance, meaning the Farm.
- The Lilliputians: A group of men from the small kingdom of Lilliput formed an army and tried to fight the Adversary. Their group caught the attention of goblins, so to save their kingdom from destruction they left for the mundane world and founded Smalltown. They had no women, until Thumbelina came along.
- The Mounted Police, also referred to as the Mouse Police, is a police force of Lilliputians mounted on Fable mice. The Mouse Police are inspired by the song And the Mouse Police Never Sleeps by Jethro Tull (from the album Heavy Horses), even though the song is about cats.
- John Barleycorn: Formally Johnny Bullhorn, he was a resident of Smalltown back when there were no women. He ventured to the Homelands and retrieved the magic barleycorns that Thumbelina was born from, bringing women to Smalltown.
- Arrow: A falcon who serves as commander of the Farm's air patrol. He accompanied the then-Johnny Bullhorn on his mission into the Homelands and Cinderella on her diplomatic mission in the Cloud Kingdoms.
- Mustard Pot Pete: A talking insect who lives in a mustard pot, Pete handles the night shift in the administration office at the Farm. He previously lived in the old cottage of one of the 13th floor witches in the Homelands, until he met John Barleycorn and Arrow.
- Miss Mousey, and possibly the frog, from the folk song Frog Went A-Courting. In the March of the Wooden Soldiers story arc, Mustard Pot Pete can be seen writing down the mouse's complaints; the text says, "Miss Mousey complained about the frogs again". In addition, Flycatcher is singing the song when he is first introduced to the readers during Legends in Exile, as does one of the Three Blind Mice in issue #100, Single Combat.
- The rhinoceros from (presumably) Rudyard Kipling's "How the Rhinoceros Got His Skin" (from Just So Stories). Identified in the Fables Encyclopedia annotations, he appears in the March of the Wooden Soldiers story arc, where he is slain in battle.
- Mary and her Lamb: Mary and her lamb lived on The Farm when her lamb was killed by Ghost. Mary was inconsolable over her lamb's death in spite of Rose Red's and the other Farm fables' best attempts to console her. Mary was later seen at Snow and Bigby's wedding enjoying herself and she, along with the other Fabletown women, was trying to catch the bouquet. In Fairest #31, it is revealed that with the loss of her lamb, Mary takes up gardening, and forms a relationship with one of the maids who milk Luna.
- The Fat Yellow Bird: Identified in the Fables Encyclopedia, the character was created and designed by Mark Buckingham.
- Jill: A Lilliputian who helped Jack steal some of Bluebeard's fortunes in exchange for freedom from the farm and to be able to see and experience the world. She is kept virtually a prisoner while Jack makes a name for himself in Hollywood and retaliates by tipping off his activities to Beast. So far, it remains unclear whether Fabletown justice condemned her for helping Jack steal their money and almost revealing their existence to the mundy world. Even though the Fables story Jack Be Nimble implies that she is the Jill of Jack and Jill fame (one of the chapters is called "Jack and Jill", and another one is called "Broken Crowns and Candlesticks"), this was not the case, as a story in Burning Questions shows Jack calling "his Jill" on a pay phone before leaving Fabletown for Hollywood.
- The Little Dog who Laughed, also known as Squire Pup, identified through his dialogue in the graphic novel 1001 Nights of Snowfall, although the Fables Encyclopedia erroneously states that the character was created by Bill Willingham.
- Mersey Dotes, now a mermaid who escaped the Adversary's aquatic forces and lives in a lake on the Farm. According to the Fables Encyclopedia, any similarity between her and the title of the song Mairzy Doats is likely coincidental.
- Col. Thunderfoot: A rabbit colonel who was cursed to remain a human until a female rabbit could love him back. Bill Willingham cites Watership Down as the inspiration for this character.
- Miss Silkytail, a female rabbit. Col. Thunderfoot tried, unsuccessfully, to woo her.
- Peter Cottontail, hired by Bigby to train his and Snow's children to hunt, though the Cubs were instructed not to kill, hurt or lay fang or claw upon Peter.
- Isengrim: From the Reynard cycle, he and Br'er Wolf tried, unsuccessfully, to catch and murder Peter Cottontail.
- Br'er Wolf: From the Uncle Remus stories.
- Incitatus, or "Tate", horse and former senator of the Homelands version of Rome. He appears in the Jack of Fables story 1883, where he assists Bigby in tracking down the title character during a flashback sequence set in the Old West.
- Lord Mountbatten: A clockwork tiger capable of taking physical form. Mowgli met him in The Indu, the Homelands version of India, and brought him to the Farm. Mountbatten was killed while accompanying Darien on a mission to save Darien's sister Therese in Far Mattagonia, a.k.a. Toyland. According to the Fables Encyclopedia, one possible inspiration for Fables' Lord Mountbatten is Tipu's Tiger, the mechanical tiger of Tipu Sultan. The historical Lord Mountbatten is Louis Mountbatten, 1st Earl Mountbatten of Burma, the last Viceroy of India.
- Bad Sam, a kinkajou who loves to drink. He is the companion of Lord Mountbatten, and came with him to the Farm.
- Jenny Wren: From a cycle of nursery rhymes, including "Cock Robin Got Up Early" (from The Happy Courtship, Merry Marriage, and Pic-nic Dinner of Cock Robin and Jenny Wren, 1806) and "Jenny Wren Fell Sick" (from T. Evans' Life and Death of Jenny Wren, circa 1800), she works for Cinderella as one of her animal spies. She hopes to find those who murdered her lost love Robin Redbreast during the Emperor's invasion of her homeland and take revenge.
- Mrs. Finch: She was killed by Mr. Dark while on a reconnaissance mission and, since birds have no teeth, she was not temporarily resurrected as a slave by her murderer. She may or may not be the "pert" and "saucy" Mrs. Kate Finch from Peter Pan in Kensington Gardens.
- Grandfather Oak: The oldest tree in the forests surrounding the Farm. After Geppetto escapes imprisonment brought onto him by animals on the Farm such as Reynard and King Noble, he seeks aid from Grandfather Oak. Grandfather Oak provides Geppetto with two dryads, Prince Aspen and Princess Alder, to be his bodyguards.
- Prince Aspen and Princess Alder: Two dryads who have been provided for Geppetto by Grandfather Oak to be his bodyguards. They are highly protective over Geppetto, particularly when Ozma appears to threaten him, but they will not obey any order that will force them to kill someone. Their service ended when Rose Red resumed her position on the farm. In the Fairest story Aldered States, it is revealed that they are now living on the outskirts of the Farm, where Princess Alder has become friends with Peter Piper and Bo Peep. Alder's unfamiliarity with the customs of modern courtship and rules of "recreational pollination" leads to several awkward situations, and what she describes as her "deplorable dating life". She attempted to date Reynard the Fox, who now had a human form, like Bigby Wolf, but due to her unfamiliarity with dating customs, the date did not go well; Reynard left, embarrassed that he had vomited in front of her. Geppetto and Aspen convince to give up dating, especially after Geppetto promises to grow her an ideal mate. Aspen appeared to fare no better, nor did he appear to care for the people of Fabletown, but in Fairest In All the Land, it was revealed that he had become attracted to the now awakened Briar Rose and the two had started a sexual relationship. Goldilocks was especially disgusted with the relationship and took especial pleasure in murdering Briar Rose, with Aspen as the second victim demanded of the sword Goldilocks was wielding, and then incinerated their bodies. Though Cinderella ultimately finished off Goldilocks and was told that Goldilocks' victims could be resurrected, Cindy could only choose half to be resurrected. Cinderella ultimately chooses Briar Rose.
- Mr. Pickles: The fishmonger from The Magic Fishbone by Charles Dickens. He appears in flashbacks in the Fairest story Aldered States, where he tries to woo Princess Alder but her plant-based perspective turns his seemingly romantic gesture on its head: when he brings her roses, she points out that dead flowers have all the sentimentality of a person handing over the corpses of her distant relatives.
- Trotty Veck: From The Chimes by Charles Dickens, he is an elderly man who works in the milking sheds. He tries and fails at courting the dryad.
- Farmer Giles: From J. R. R. Tolkien's Farmer Giles of Ham and referred to in Aldered States, he had a one-night stand with Princess Alder.

== Villains ==
=== The Adversary ===
The Adversary's actions are responsible for the entire premise of the comic book, in that the real Adversary masterminded the conquest of the Fable homelands, and centuries ago forced the Fables to flee into the mundane world.

During the Boy Blue's encounter with the heavily armoured and massively imposing figure Adversary, he is shown to be a figurehead and literal puppet, with this fact and the true identity of the Empire's ruler unknown to even most of the Empire's top leaders. The Adversary is eventually revealed to be Geppetto. He was the primary antagonist for a long time in the series, but later on, his role is replaced by Mister Dark.

Bill Willingham originally intended for the Adversary to be revealed as Peter Pan. The term "The Adversary" appears to be based on "The Enemy", the common term for Sauron in The Lord of the Rings. Peter Pan did eventually make an appearance in 1001 Nights of Snowfall. It has also been theorized that the title "The Adversary" could be derived from Jewish and Christian literature where the name "Satan" actually comes from the Hebrew word for "Adversary".

=== Goldilocks ===
The girl who broke into the Three Bears' home and ate their porridge has grown up, Goldilocks is a gun-toting Leftist political agitator. She led about half of the Farm against Snow White in a revolution. Despite her claims to be fighting for the 'rights' of the Farm Fables, and even becoming Little Bear's lover, her actions make it quite clear that she didn't care about the cause in the slightest, simply the power that such a position would provide. It was hoped that she had been killed after attempting to assassinate Bigby and Snow White, all the while still attempting to kill the two. Her popularity as a Fable allowed her to regenerate from her horrendous injuries and she eventually reappeared on the scene in the spin-off series Jack of Fables as a prisoner of Mr. Revise. During this time, she once again leads a revolution; this time, she leads her revolutionaries to believe Bookburner and his army is coming to save them from their captivity at Golden Boughs. Bookburner's army shot the revolutionaries down when they finally arrived, but Goldilocks survived (or came back to life) and reappeared in Fairest.

In Fairest In All the Land, it was revealed that Goldilocks may have a taste for, as Reynard puts it, "forbidden fruit", as she attempted to seduce Brock Blueheart (in addition, the Animal Farm story arc revealed that she once had a sexual relationship with Boo Bear). It also revealed that she was more psychotic than Fabletown really knew. In this story, Cinderella had started investigating the murders of powerful women (i.e. Snow White, Rose Red, Beauty, and even Briar Rose). With help from Bo Peep, she discovered it was Goldilocks behind the murders while utilizing a sword of regret that would guarantee the wielder a kill at the price of a second victim but had become cursed so only half the victims could be resurrected. Though her reasons varied, some she had an obvious vendetta against people like Snow; other murders, she apparently justified by finding them tainted in a way. While she boasts about her Briar Rose's death, she murders her and Prince Aspen mostly because she found them involved intimately, though Goldilocks herself did worse than all the women she murdered. Ultimately, Goldilocks fought a final showdown with Bo Peep and Cinderella, with Bo losing her life. Cinderella apparently killed her off for good using the same sword Goldilocks used, but due to the sword's ability, Cinderella could only resurrect half the victims.

Goldilocks is quite adept at tracking enemies in the wilderness, and is extremely skilled with a rifle, easily incapacitating Bigby in his giant wolf form when ambushed from behind. Contrary to her innocent-looking appearance, she has very keen senses, and is shown to be quite reckless and determined when she intends to kill someone. Cinderella later tells Snow White that Goldilocks had to die because if they had not killed her, she would have continued the murdering like a ravenous animal.

=== Bluebeard ===
The former nobleman and serial killer who has reformed, or rather pretended he had, Bluebeard was involved with various shady dealings in Fabletown. He was enormously wealthy, nearly singlehandedly supporting the Fabletown government (which had no way to levy taxes, and thus relied on donations from wealthy patrons) and was able to afford even the top magical spells (his entire palace was hidden inside a room of his apartment). He considered himself to be the nemesis of Bigby Wolf, using every opportunity to try to put the Sheriff down. When he pointed out to Wolf that his threats lost their value if Bigby didn't follow them through, Bigby responded that he never needed to because Bluebeard, a terror against weaker and/or helpless opponents, always backed down when faced with a stronger one. This observation caused Bluebeard to shed tears, and to hate Bigby even more and he attempted to engineer his assassination and that of Snow White, working in conjunction with Goldilocks. Bluebeard was killed by Prince Charming who, out of some guilt over his own mistreatment of Snow White, sought to prevent Bluebeard from ordering that assassination attempt on Snow and Bigby, but it had already been put into motion. As well, Charming wanted to seize his vast assets. Contrary to what his name might suggest, he is not, nor ever was, a pirate. His body was dropped down the witching well. Bluebeard later appears along with other deceased Fables. He says that he has learned to be virtuous, though Lancelot and Fly believe that his position of villain has not changed. After being caught conspiring with Shere Khan to kill Flycatcher, his flesh form was taken away. He aided the Adversary's troops in attacking Fly's new stronghold, as Fly anticipated. Afterwards, he stayed with the Adversary, whose magicians are attempting to make him once more corporeal.

=== Ichabod Crane ===
Ichabod Crane's main appearance is in Cinderella Libertine, where it is revealed that Fabletown's former Deputy Mayor lost his job after he sexually harassed Snow White and embezzled government funds. He spent his years hiding through Europe, then recently France, which was where Fabletown's spy, Cinderella, found him. Cindy tricked Ichabod into believing her to be a spy for the Adversary and coming to Paris with her. Using her wits and feminine charm, she exposed him as a traitor willing to turn to the Adversary for revenge on the Fables. She even seduced him into signing a full confession. Bigby then executed Crane by bashing him in the head with a headless statue of Napoleon Bonaparte. Flashbacks from Crane's time as Deputy Mayor appear in the story Barleycorn Brides, the story arc Sons of Empire, the Jack of Fables story arc 1883, and Peter & Max: A Fables Novel, with the character also playing a role in the events of The Wolf Among Us.

=== Baba Yaga ===
One of the Adversary's most powerful sorceresses, Baba Yaga arrived in Fabletown after taking the form of Red Riding Hood. In this disguise, she seduced, interrogated and tortured Boy Blue, and then led an army of wooden soldiers to attack Fabletown. She was defeated in a magical battle with Frau Totenkinder on the roof of the main Fabletown building where Totenkinder had spent years laying down protective spells, giving her the advantage. The rest of Fabletown believes Baba Yaga died in this battle, but Bigby and Totenkinder kept her alive and restrained, regularly drained of magical power, in a secret prison cell in order to extract information from her.

Her legendary chicken-legged hut was sent to the mundane world during the battle between Baba Yaga and the Boxers, an elite team of sorcerers whose mission is to seal away "Great old powers". To detain the witch, they had to remove her hut, as it protected her from the Boxers' lures. A conjured Field Gate was set up to send the hut to a random world, which turned out to be the mundane world, leaving Baba Yaga behind. Without the hut's protection, she was quickly captured. After fifty years of being "boxed away" she struck a deal with the Empire to serve it instead of being trapped forever.

The hut was stored at the Farm, kept under tight magical control. It awoke during the Baba Yaga's mission, broke through the controlling spells and went on a rampage when Baba Yaga came through in disguise, providing Frau Totenkinder with a clue to her true identity. It was shown tied down on the Farm shortly after Baba Yaga's escape.

Baba Yaga is served by the three demigod knights of the Rus, Bright Day, Radiant Sun and Dark Night, who rank among the most formidable warriors in the Empire. All three faced and were defeated by Boy Blue during his return to the Homelands, but due to their irrevocable bond with Baba Yaga, none of the three were able to die. Bright Day represented his mistress at the Imperial conference, appearing only as a head.

Later, after Mr. Dark was released and unbound the various enchantments that had drawn on his power, including those holding her, Baba Yaga escaped from her cell, only to find herself trapped in the labyrinth rubble. She summons her knights, fully reformed, and plans her escape, but before she can flee, she is defeated and killed, by the unlikely Bufkin who had been trapped within the Woodland office as well.

=== The Wooden Soldiers ===
The Empire's main military force consist of Geppetto's living wooden children. Although Geppetto maintains a large number of human troops, the wooden soldiers do the most difficult work, including the invasion of foreign lands, due to their extreme resiliency. Early on in the development of the Empire, they were used to take over kingdoms through trickery, by killing a king and replacing him with a wooden look-alike. Pinocchio was the first one Geppetto created, but since then his creations have altered significantly. In addition to being created as adults rather than children, in both genders, they are brought to life with spells compelling them to obey Geppetto. Aside from the Emperor, most wooden soldiers are highly derisive of all non-wooden life forms, human, Fable or otherwise. Sometimes they will even assault and murder "meat" without provocation, as seen as when Hugh, Drew, and Lou (the first three soldiers to infiltrate Fabletown) murdered a gun salesman. In contrast, they are very close to each other, addressing themselves as "Brother" and "Sister"; they also look "up" to Pinocchio, whom they see as their oldest sibling, since he was the first of their kind (despite the fact that he has since become human).

A force of them were sent to Fabletown in March of the Wooden Soldiers; they were defeated in the Battle of Fabletown. Although they were sent ostensibly to collect every single magical item that was taken out of the Homelands and return it to the Empire, they also came with the clear intent to kill as many of the Fables as they could, something that they seemed to take pleasure in anticipating. These soldiers are all identical, with hands and heads enchanted to look human, allowing them to more easily pass through the mundane world without suspicion. These soldiers all appear in matching suits, sunglasses and toupees (one observing mundane assumed they were a procession of Young Republicans). Generally, they are only distinguishable from each other by wig color. Three of the soldiers, Hugh, Drew and Louis are apparently the leaders; they are the first to appear in New York (with Baba Yaga), and are the first to visit Fabletown, warning that they will return to confiscate all magic items. They also steal guns (from the murdered gun salesman) to use in the battle, and oversee the construction and arming of their brothers. When every wooden soldier is assembled into an army of hundreds, they invade Fabletown en masse. Eventually, due to the leadership of Snow White and the nick-of-time appearance by Bigby Wolf, the soldiers are defeated, but not before killing many Fables. The soldiers afterwards are incarcerated as severed heads, and interrogated by Bigby Wolf and Cinderella; each individual soldier, when separated from his brothers, starts talking relatively quickly. Their bodies were thrown down the Witching Well.

In The Good Prince a large host of them marched on Flycatcher's kingdom of Haven. After surrendering to them, Fly used his magic to revert them into the Sacred Grove they were carved from. Not only did this supply Haven with its own defensive barrier, it also deprived Geppetto of his resources, as only one Sacred Grove can exist at a time.

In "Witches", the captured and beheaded Wooden Soldiers at least partially overcome the xenophobia they nurture for every flesh being (other than Geppetto and Pinocchio) and assist Bufkin in his quest for survival, because of the kindness he had shown them.

=== The Snow Queen ===
A sorceress of great power, Lumi (Finnish for "snow"), better known as the Snow Queen, is the commander of the Emperor's personal guard.

According to Jack Horner, she is one of four sisters, each representing one of the seasons, who jointly ruled four kingdoms with each moving in a yearly cycle to bring the seasons in a predictable manner to their subjects. She was once naive and good-natured, with a childlike and somewhat gullible personality. That changed after Lumi had a relationship with Jack. Feeling unwell as the seasonal change approached, she naively gave her powers to Jack, creating the persona of Jack Frost, trusting him to arrange the transfer of the winter season to the next kingdom in the cycle. Jack immediately ignored her wishes, heading off to seek out new women to seduce and generally misuse the abilities given to him, abandoning Lumi, who quickly came to realise that she was not, in fact, unwell, but was instead pregnant with Jack's child. Jack's misadventures quickly wrecked the flow of the seasons, turning the population against her. Eventually, Lumi's three sisters were able to persuade Jack to return the powers that he'd taken. Angered by his betrayal, Lumi grew as cold as the season she controlled. While Jack is a compulsive liar, casting doubt on some of the details, Lumi took offence at a mention of "Jack Frost" during the War and Pieces story arc, suggesting that at least some of this backstory is accurate.

She was present when Boy Blue cut off the head of the Emperor during the Homelands story arc and even detected his presence before he revealed himself, but was unable to determine who he was masquerading as and thus prevent his attack. When Blue escaped from captivity, Geppetto swore to send the Snow Queen after him to get revenge. In the Sons of Empire story, she acted as host of the Imperial conference called after Bigby's destruction of the magic grove. At the conference, she set out a four-stage plan for the invasion and destruction of the mundane world, which was generally approved, although she was instructed to make alterations after Pinocchio gave details of the likely response to such an assault.

At the climax of the war between Fabletown and the Empire, as shown in War and Pieces, Lumi was present in the Imperial capital when Briar Rose, the legendary Sleeping Beauty, intentionally activated her curse within the city. Lumi immediately fell asleep with the rest of the population. When she fell into slumber, her powers were transmitted to her son, the new Jack Frost. He, however, returned them to her shortly afterward, but apparently this was not sufficient to wake her up. Recently, the city was burned to the ground, but not before both Lumi and Sleeping Beauty were carried away, still asleep, by a mysterious cadre of goblins.

Lumi eventually awakens when Ali Baba kisses Briar Rose, as seen in the comic Fairest. After killing and torturing all the goblins, who "dared to put their warty hands on her and dump her in a cart, like a bag of thrash", the Snow Queen, seeking vengeance on Briar Rose for putting her to sleep for years, sends her ice giants after Briar Rose, Noah and Ali Baba. Eventually, both are captured and taken to the Snow Queen. Instead of killing them, she asks the imp Noah to tell her the story of Briar Rose, as Lumi "is addicted to good stories". It is revealed that Lumi's actions while serving Geppetto were a result of Geppetto giving her his loyalty potions (the same ones he used to bind Pinocchio and all the other wooden soldiers to him) that made her utterly loyal to him. After being asleep for years, the spell has worn off, and she is gradually becoming a more sympathetic person. Ali Baba eventually realizes that he has no feelings for Briar Rose after all, but is in love with Lumi. Lumi discovers that she likes and is attracted to Ali Baba, and believes that love can grow from that. The two go back to Lumi's homeland, and start a new life together. Lumi would make an appearance in the Fairest graphic novel Fairest In All the Land, being round up among many female Fables who were possible targets of an murderer named Goldilocks, who murdered both Lumi and Ali Baba. Cinderella could only pick half of Goldilocks' victims to resurrect. She choose Lumi because, although Cinderella never knew the Adversary, she saw Lumi as a victim at his hands.

The Snow Queen has repeatedly shown a sharp mind and a cunning aptitude. She is generally surrounded by an aura of cold, to the extent that it is usually snowing in her vicinity, often to the annoyance of those around her, not that any of them would dare say anything. She is capable of pulling in the winter weather surrounding her if she so chooses, but rarely does so. She commands legions of frost creatures, including giants. She seems to have either always known who the true leader of the Empire was or has known for quite some time, as she has been repeatedly shown as one of Geppetto's closest and most trusted allies.

=== Rodney and June ===
Spies for the Adversary, Rodney and June started out as two of Geppetto's wooden children, Rodney a highly decorated junior officer in the forces assaulting the Arabian Fablelands and June a medic assigned temporarily to his unit. Meeting when Rodney was injured, the pair swiftly grew to enjoy each other's company and began to court each other, despite not really having much of a clue how to go about it. Eventually, Rodney wrote a letter to Geppetto, asking that they be made flesh, so that they could marry and be together properly. The letter was read before dispatch by Rodney's superior officer who was shocked by the content, as it revealed a number of facts about Geppetto's true position within the Empire that would cause immense problems should they get out. He initially locked Rodney up, unsure how to proceed, then ultimately relented. Destroying the letter, he announced that Geppetto should be reassured that there had been no letter and that the situation was under control and dispatched Rodney to do so, with June accompanying him to provide additional witness, observing quietly to the pair that had somebody wanted to ask Geppetto what had supposedly been in the non-existent letter, then it would make much more sense to ask him in person.

Reaching Geppetto after months of travel, Rodney and June made their request. Geppetto talked with them for some hours, then told them that such a great gift would always come with a price and asked them to think about whether they'd be willing to pay it. Rodney and June accepted, were made flesh and were married in a grand ceremony presided over by the Emperor himself. They settled down happily and swiftly conceived a child. Shortly thereafter, they were visited by the Snow Queen, who explained the service that was required of them. They were briefed on life in America, then were sent through and were installed in a small apartment in New York under the name Greenwood, only a couple of blocks from Fabletown, with orders to spy on the Fables there and to study up on sabotage and murder techniques in case they're required to take a more active role. They write their reports in a journal which is magically linked to an identical volume in the Homelands. Orders are passed to them in the same way; occasionally they are provided with specific instructions detailing tasks to be carried out, sometimes involving violent acts. Though both appear to be highly ambivalent about what they do, and June in particular worries about how the recent birth of their daughter (Junebug) will affect things, they nevertheless remain loyal to the Empire - the magic that changed them to flesh ensures that.

Rodney was one of the attendees at the Imperial conference called after Bigby's destruction of the magic grove. He was apparently horrified by the genocidal plan suggested for the mundane world by the Snow Queen and consulted with Pinocchio about how this could be prevented.

Pinocchio convinced Rodney and June to surrender to Fabletown authorities. Pinocchio also gave them the ability to defy the loyalty magic of Geppetto by explaining that although they need to do what is best for father Geppetto, they don't need to do what he orders since Geppetto may indeed be mentally unsound, and thus defying the empire might, in fact, be the best thing for Geppetto, since he is acting in a way that harms himself.

=== Hansel ===
Lord Hansel, of Hansel and Gretel fame, holds the position of Head of the Imperial Inquisition and is one of the most feared men in the Empire. After their misadventure in the Homelands involving Frau Totenkinder, whom the children push into her own oven, Hansel and Gretel emerge from the forests to find their land overrun by the Adversary's forces. They flee, staying ahead of the invading armies and taking sanctuary in one church after another until they learn of the mundane world. Arriving there in the mid-17th century, they made their way to the newly established Fabletown, where they are shocked to discover Frau Totenkinder among the Fables already present. Hansel immediately demands her execution, only to be informed that, under the terms of the Fabletown Compact, Totenkinder had been granted amnesty for her actions in the Homelands. Disgusted, Hansel announces his intention to live among the mundane population, leaving his sister behind in Fabletown.

Hansel moves to Europe, where he swiftly establishes a name for himself as a witch hunter, testifying in numerous trials and taking part enthusiastically in the executions. It reaches the point where his word is considered sufficient to convict a suspect of witchcraft. Hundreds of people are executed at his word. When the Salem witch trials break out in 1692, Hansel immediately returns to America to participate. Reports of his activities greatly concerned the Fabletown authorities, but as he remained within the letter of the Fabletown laws, no action can be taken against him.

Nearby for the first time in many years, Hansel visits Fabletown, asking to see his sister. He begs her to leave Fabletown, as it has only been her presence that stops him from assembling the forces required to obliterate the place. Gretel refuses, explaining to him that she has spent time studying with Frau Totenkinder in the intervening years and has gained a new appreciation for the magic arts, seeing them not as the devil's work, but as a useful tool. Horrified and enraged, Hansel strikes her viciously with a chair, snapping her neck instantly. As no witnesses are present, he tries to claim that it had been an accident, but he is not believed. Hansel is stricken from the Fabletown Compact and banished forever. He continues with his witch-finding activities, but as time passes and the witch-hunts cease, his fame becomes infamy and he vanishes from the mundane world.

Returning to the Homelands, Hansel is tasked with investigating and punishing any unauthorized use of sorcery. It is implied that his job is not to give alleged sorcerers fair trials but simply to stamp out illegal sorcery through terror. He is one of the attendees at the Imperial conference called after Bigby's destruction of the magic grove, although he is not apprised of the war plans outlined by the Snow Queen so that he could not reveal them were he to be subjected to interrogation. Geppetto designates him as the Empire's official envoy to Fabletown, but his real mission in the mundane world is to recover Baba Yaga and the wooden soldiers and return them to the Homelands. He is initially given three years to accomplish this, as Geppetto is intent on a full-scale attack on the mundane world in 2009.

His initial discussions with Fabletown, however, meet with no success, as Prince Charming, having been informed by Frau Totenkinder that the Empire has no real interest in negotiation and was beginning to mobilise for an invasion, simply stalls Hansel at every opportunity, making demands that the envoy finds increasingly outrageous.

Hansel is next seen during the Skulduggery story arc, where he and his men intercept Pinocchio in Santiago, Chile, as he returns to Fabletown from the Homelands. Pinocchio's escort, Cinderella, while initially also captured, is able to escape and rescue Pinocchio, slaying most of his captors. Uncertain whether Hansel is still officially an accredited envoy to Fabletown, Cinderella elects not to kill him and settles for shooting him in both knees.

In The Great Fables Crossover, Kevin Thorn summons Hansel and Sam, hoping they can inspire him in writing his masterpiece. After numerous disagreements, Sam eventually dumps Hansel out of his wheelchair and off a cliff.

In the Fables spin-off, Everafter, Hansel is revealed to have joined the Shadow Players as an agent tasked to protect the Mundy world from its new magic. Upon finding the "package", a newly manifested mundy witch with incredible powers, his bigotry against witches manifests once more, driving him to attempt to murder her. In a turn of events, he was swiftly blown apart by the child, which seemed to end his life once and for all. His remains are collected by his fellow Shadow Player, Peter Piper, and magically revived by Feathertop.

=== The Nome King ===
The much feared Nome King, also known as Roquat the Red, is from L. Frank Baum's tales of the land of Oz. He is the current ruler of that land, as well as many of the surrounding kingdoms and Imperial districts. He attended the Imperial conference called after the destruction of the magic grove and was positively delighted by the plans outlined by the Snow Queen for the effective genocide of the mundane population. He did feel, however, that the plan could be improved with his assistance, feeling that he had many minions that could be of great use. In the wake of the fall of the Adversary's Empire, the Nome King creates his own, pan-Ozian empire. He was killed during Bufkin's revolution, when the Nome King's own hanging rope magically came to life and snapped its master's head off.

=== Max Piper ===
The Pied Piper of Hamelin was the antagonist of Peter & Max: A Fables Novel. He was the elder brother to Peter Piper, and a sorcerer powerful enough to face Frau Totenkinder. Born in Hesse, the Homeland that mirrors German fables, Max and Peter's family were caught in the middle of a goblin invasion (under the supervision of the then-burgeoning Empire). The Piper family had a tradition of woodwinds performance, and passed down an ancient pipe named Frost from generation to generation. When Max was denied the inheritance in favor of his younger brother, he started to exhibit sociopathic tendencies, and ran away after murdering his father, lost during the invasion.

During his wandering, he encountered Frau Totenkinder, who gave him the magical flute named Fire, an artifact of astounding potential. Over the course of Frau's trials and teaching, Max increased in power exponentially, which also came from sealing bargains with otherworldly powers. In exchange for the location of Frost from Totenkinder, he stole the children of Hamelin (whose parents had offended Totenkinder), exchanging their lives for the debts of his evil teachers. After a brief battle with Peter and suffering exile after being defeated by Peter, Max returned even more powerful as well as more intent on killing his brother. In the early 20th Century, he cast a curse that increased the lethality of the Spanish flu, at least in mundies. It caused stillbirths and extreme birth defects in Fable children, if not out and out sterility in Fables in general. After a battle with Totenkinder in New York, he was exiled again, only to return in the early 21st Century. He met his end in the mundy version of Hamelin at the hands of his brother, Peter Piper. Max has a brief flashback appearance in the graphic novel 1001 Nights of Snowfall and is referred to in issue #89 (Witches story arc), as well as the Fairest graphic novel Fairest in All the Land.

=== Mister Dark ===
A mysterious and extremely powerful entity with chalk-white skin and black hair, he replaced The Adversary as the main antagonist. Trapped by the Boxing League, a division of Warlocks specialized in capturing and containing the most dangerous of magical threats, during the expansion of the empire, Mister Dark was contained within a stone box which drained his power and transmitted it to be used by the Adversary. Looters mistakenly released the creature who proceeded to drain them of life. Mister Dark reacquired his stolen power including a portion that powered the Witching Cloak, destroyed the enchantments that held the Fabletown buildings together and set off to Fabletown to seek revenge. Upon arrival, he captured and then killed Kay, as well as a few hundred New York residents for the construction of his new palace. A composite character like Jack and Frau Totenkinder, he represents every version of the boogeyman. Other names for him are The Dullahan, The Khokhan, The Buse, Mörkö, The Dunganga, The Abo Ragl Ma Slokha, Burned man, the lake man, Buback and the Torbalan along with many other names. He is the same "kind" as Baba Yaga. Mister Dark's primary source of power is the fear of those who surround him. The more that fear him, the greater his power becomes; if he is surrounded by those who possess little fear, he becomes weaker. He has the power to consume the teeth of humans and, by spitting them up one at a time, summoning the spirit of the owner of said tooth to serve him. He can do this once per tooth, so he can generally do this a maximum of thirty-two times (less if the person in question had poor oral hygiene).

Mr. Dark was killed when the North Wind brought him up into the North Wind's own realm of elemental ice and wind. There, Mr. North entered his Casket of Primordial Winds (a suicide mechanism kept in case he got tired of this life, since nothing much could harm him) and took Mr. Dark with him, killing them both.

=== Fairy Godmother ===
After the fall of the Empire, an unknown, powerful magic user from another realm invaded the Homelands kingdom of Ultima Thule. The usurper eventually turned out to be Cinderella's fairy godmother, as seen in Cinderella: From Fabletown with Love. Cinderella, Fabletown's secret agent, was able to uncover the identity of the usurper and put an end to the Fairy Godmother's dictatorship, but she could not bring herself to kill her, and instead turned her over to Ultima Thule's citizens for punishment. It is unknown what became of her after this. The story implied that Briar Rose and Cinderella shared the same fairy godmother. This seems to have been proven apocryphal in the Fairest story arc Wide Awake (where none of Briar's fairy seven godmothers look anything like her), but the Fables Encyclopedia refers to Cinderella's fairy godmother as a meddler in Briar Rose's life, indicating that there may have been more fairy godmothers involved than what was shown in Fairest. The Fairy Godmother had two sisters, one with green and one with blue wings, while she herself has pink wings (like Flora, Fauna, and Merryweather from Disney's Sleeping Beauty). Her sisters were killed by Frau Totenkinder, who was the Fairy Godmother's enemy who often ruined her spells. The Fairy Godmother also showed Rapunzel's prince the way to the tower that Frau kept her in, mainly to spite Totenkinder. She attacked Ultima Thule because she wanted to make the worlds a better place, and decided it was time to force people to be happy. Her catchphrases are "reality is only what we make of it" and "you can't go to a ball without breaking a few pumpkins".

The Fairy Godmother also appears in flashbacks from Rapunzel's story in the Fairest story arc The Hidden Kingdom. It is revealed that she kept the prince from seeing Rapunzel again, as the godmother had plans for her. It is hinted she may have had a hand in the abduction of Rapunzel's daughters, but if she was the one to kidnap them, it is not known where she took them, since they were not present with her when Cinderella found her in Ultima Thule.

=== Dorothy Gale ===
Dorothy Gale was first seen in Jack of Fables, as one of the many Fable prisoners at the Golden Boughs Retirement Village. Her story is told in the Fables spin-off Cinderella: Fables Are Forever, where it is revealed that the former innocent farm girl became a professional killer for hire, going by the code "Silverslipper". She went on to become Cinderella's greatest nemesis.

It is revealed that Dorothy developed a taste for killing for hire after she, as seen in The Wonderful Wizard of Oz, killed the Wicked Witch of the West in exchange for a trip back home. She had already killed the Wicked Witch of the East by accident when Dorothy's house landed on her, and was given a pair of magic silver slippers from the Good Witch of the North as a reward. When the Wizard heard that Dorothy had already taken care of one witch, he hired her to kill another. Dorothy took the job, and discovered that she liked it. After Glinda the Good Witch explained to her about the powers of the magic slippers, Dorothy used them to fly home to the Homelands version of Kansas. To her great despair, the slippers fell off over the Deadly Desert of Oz.

Dorothy and a few of her friends, the Tin Woodman, the Cowardly Lion and Toto made it into the mundy world in the year of 1943. They had fled from Oz years before, ahead of the invading armies of the Adversary, and had been on the run ever since. The Tin Man and the Cowardly Lion hid out on the Jersey pine barrens, while Dorothy sought out Fabletown to find them all a safe haven. Dorothy, however, reacted strongly to the stated terms in the Fabletown compact that was presented to her, and stormed off in anger, refusing to let anyone "tie her hands like that", meaning she didn't want to be a good person and enjoyed killing too much. She left her friends behind and walked off with Toto in her arms, feeling that the others were dead weight and never came back for them. Dorothy created a new life for herself as a killer for hire in the mundy world, and had no trouble finding work. She eventually crossed paths with Fabletown spy Cinderella, who ran into Dorothy during several of Cindy's secret missions for Fabletown, getting in the way for Dorothy's work. Dorothy pointed out every chance they had, that she and Cindy were exactly the same but that she was better than Cindy. Cindy, however, greatly denied that as she killed to protect Fables and humans as a patriotic act. She calls Dorothy a cold-blooded killer who did it for fun and was dangerous. Cindy was in her way, better than Dorothy due to Dorothy's ego and her constant want to prove she's better than Cindy. Cindy didn't care nor did she feel she has to prove her worth to anyone.

It came down to a final confrontation, when Dorothy kidnapped Snow White and was planning to hold her hostage. The two had several violent encounters over the years, until Cindy almost finished Dorothy off in Switzerland in the year of 1986 by throwing Dorothy off a cliff. Dorothy, passed out, was found by Mr. Revise's people and was imprisoned at the Golden Boughs Retirement Village where she was thrown down Revise's memory hole. When she emerged, she had been stripped of most of her memories and was again the same innocent girl she had been so long ago.

The years passed, and Dorothy described them as living in a fog where she could not think straight. When the Golden Boughs was destroyed, the memory hole was destroyed with it, all of Dorothy's memories came back. As mentioned in a conversation between the Cowardly Lion and the Tin Man during the final Jack of Fables story arc, Dorothy then struck off on her own. The Lions mentions that she got "all dark", and the Tin Man responds that Dorothy always was "kind of creepy".

As seen in Cinderella: Fables Are Forever, she began plotting her revenge on Cinderella, while also for the first time remembering where she actually lost the silver slippers. She returned to the Deadly Desert and managed to get the slippers back by hanging off an aircraft on a rope, careful not to touch the deadly sand. She recruited the Spoon Brigade from The Emerald City of Oz, Bungle, the Glass Cat and a Chiss to assist her in her plan for revenge.

When Mr. Kadabra is mysteriously killed by an unknown assailant, all signs point to Cinderella's nemesis from the old. Cindy sets out to find her, aided by Ivan Durak of Shadow Fabletown, who claims that Dorothy has been hired to kill him. Eventually, both are abducted and taken to the Deadly Desert of Oz, where Dorothy is waiting. Before they reach their destination, both manage to escape in the middle of the desert. Cindy is feeling ready to face Dorothy, but Ivan drugs her, and she wakes up tied to a chair, Dorothy standing before her with Toto at her side. Toto had previously been killed during the mass escape from the Golden Boughs, but, as Priscilla Page points out during the Jack of Fables story arc The (Nearly) Great Escape, "killed Fables often get magically replaced by new versions of the same Fables".

It is revealed that Dorothy was Ivan all along (the real Ivan has been dead for a long time; most likely sometime between the 1980s or her escape from Mr. Revise), disguising herself using her magic silver slippers. Cindy manages to persuade Dorothy to untie her and fight her in a real battle, in which Cindy steals the silver slippers and defeats Dorothy by pushing her from a great height into the Deadly Desert, apparently killing her, though her body is not seen.

Dorothy has a brief appearance in the Fables story In Those Days, in a flashback that shows the death of Mister Kadabra. As previously implied, it was Dorothy who killed him. Dorothy is also referred to in the story arc Cubs in Toyland.

=== Hadeon the Destroyer ===
The evil fairy from Sleeping Beauty, she appears in the Fairest story arc Wide Awake. She is the ruler of the Forest of Dire Blight, in the Homelands. Even though she was the one to actually cast the curse over Briar Rose, the Fables story arc War and Pieces and Cinderella: From Fabletown with Love implies that Frau Totenkinder was its creator.

In Fairest, Briar defeats Hadeon once and for all when the latter shows up to pick a fight with the Snow Queen, because Hadeon likes to pick a fight every century or so, to keep her tools honed. Hadeon nearly defeats Lumi, but Briar, wanting revenge for what Hadeon did to her as a baby, decides to take matters into her own hands. It is revealed that because Hadeon cast the curse on Briar Rose all those years ago, Briar has become immune to her magic. Briar defeats Hadeon with a few solid punches to the jaw. Her fairy godmothers turn Hadeon into a car that can travel to any world, and the spaces between worlds. The car has to serve one thousand times before it will revert to Hadeon. Briar uses the car to get back to Fabletown, before lending it to Bigby Wolf, who is searching for his lost cubs, Darien and Therese. When the car has been used nine hundred and ninety-nine times, Briar plans to take it to the junkyard and have Hadeon destroyed once and for all by dropping it into a car crusher. Hadeon's ultimate fate is given in the next-to-last compilation, Fables: Happily Ever After. After many years of adventuring, Briar Rose, who had been scratched by an undead blade, begins to succumb to a zombie-like curse. She returns to Fabletown to collect Hadeon, who has exactly one ride left before returning to her own form. Briar Rose commands Hadeon to take her "to the end of the universe" and then pricks her finger, declaring that if she must turn into an undead horror, she will not be awake for it and will keep her oath to prevent Hadeon from harming anyone ever again.

=== Prince Brandish/Werian Holt ===
The prince from Snow White and Rose Red. Unlike in the fairy tale, the prince did not marry Snow White, as his father, the king, refused to let Brandish marry a common peasant girl. Centuries later, he assumed the name of Werian Holt, and was brought to the mundy world by Mr. Dark to serve as fencing instructor for Mrs. Sprat. After Mr. Dark's death, he begins to teach the transformed Mrs. Sprat the art of assassination, and becomes her co-conspirator on an unknown dark plan for Fabletown. When the Fables come to claim Dark's castle as their own, both Spratt and Holt pretend to have been Mr. Dark's prisoners.

He has recently revealed himself to Snow, much to Spratt's surprise and disdain (as she knew nothing of his past and was still very bitter to Snow). He forcefully tries to take claim on Snow as his legal wife, because they promised to marry each other back in the Homelands. Snow tries pushing away his advances, but he's very determined to have her and plans to kill Bigby and all of the children she had with him, and also plans to make her replace the children with their human children. While Bigby is away, Brandish takes Snow captive and locks her up in one of the towers in Mr. Dark's castle. He bewitches himself so that any injury inflicted on him will also hurt Snow, making any attempt at rescue complicated. When Snow attacks him in an attempt to free herself, he breaks her arm to teach her a lesson and make her more docile. Snow vows to kill him herself. Bigby eventually arrives to free his wife, but Brandish transforms him into a statue made of glass. Snow eventually manages to escape, while Morgan le Fay manages to break the spell that Brandish put on himself. Snow utilizes the fencing lessons once given to her by her ex-husband, Prince Charming and engages Brandish in a sword duel. Even with a broken arm, and much to Brandish's surprise, Snow manages to gain the upper hand, and stabs him through the heart, but not before Brandish shatters the statue of Bigby.

As Doctor Swineheart performs an autopsy on the fallen prince, Brandish awakens just as Swineheart discovers a cavity where the prince's heart should be, with rune-etched brass fittings capping off the various branches of the circulatory system that would normally connect to a human heart. It is revealed that he had his heart magically removed from his own body, making him difficult to kill. Rose Red takes Brandish captive and offers him an ultimatum: he can spend the rest of his immortal life buried in concrete, or serve her and her new Round Table. Brandish accepts. Rose will soon regret her decision as it puts a great distance between the just recently reconciled sisters. More so, Brandish stays true to his real colors. He quickly murders Weyland Smith, becoming tired of being a squire (and most likely surviving under them), and demands to have his innocence proven via trial by combat against Lancelot. After he manages to best and kill Lancelot after three days of fighting, Brandish assumes that he is finally freed of service under Rose Red, but an outraged Flycatcher asserts his prerogative as a king and orders Brandish's execution for his crimes, again via trial by combat, this time against Flycatcher, who is aware of his poor skills as a swordsman. During their duel, Grimble in his bluebird form, enchanted with spells from the Thirteenth Floor witches, succeeds in finding and infiltrating the fortress where Brandish's heart is kept. Grimble destroys the heart, causing a shocked Brandish to collapse and die from heart failure without Flycatcher needing to kill the prince.

=== Peter Pan ===
The actual villain of the fables living in Fabletown, he was an ally of Geppetto when he was the Adversary and living most of his life in Neverland. He has one true friend, and former lover, named Tinker Bell. He is based on Peter Pan from the story of J. M. Barrie.

== Literals and Part-Literals ==
=== Kevin Thorn ===
Kevin Thorn is a former New York City journalist who has the ability to see behind the illusions cast by Fabletown magic-users. After the Battle of Fabletown, the anchorman on the news show Thorn worked for reported an out-of-control block party, a building fire and a gang fight on the Upper West Side; minutes later, the details were fading from everyone's head but Kevin's. After reporting this to his boss, he was fired for "going all X-Files". Kevin has now dedicated himself to discovering what exactly is going on on the Upper West Side. He is leaving a complete paper trail in case of his sudden death (which he now considers to be a strong possibility). During the Sons of Empire story arc, it is revealed that Kevin is acting as a superintendent at a house three blocks away from Fabletown. This house is also now occupied by Hansel and his staff, though Kevin seems unaware of their true identities. In Kevin's free time (when not spying on Fabletown residents), he is writing a book describing what it is he has discovered of the Fables. He has been keeping an eye on them for long enough now to be familiar with many of the regulars and has noticed the disappearance of several - Bigby Wolf, Snow White, Boy Blue and so forth - linked with references to "The Farm". He has come to the conclusion that "the Farm" is actually a euphemism for execution, giving him the mistaken impression that the Fables willingly kill their own without reservation. He is aware that Tommy Sharp was also investigating Fabletown and was subsequently murdered, which has only served to heighten his misgiving about the Fables.

During the Jack of Fables arc The Bad Prince the reason for Thorn being able to see through the Fables' illusions is finally given: he is, in fact, a Literal, beings who are like Fables, but represent literary devices rather than actual characters. Like many Fables, though, he was taken to Golden Boughs Retirement Village and was stripped of his memories so that he could be made into an ordinary human being. When he begins to regain his memories, he is recaptured so that the process can be repeated. In that process, it is implied he is one of the most powerful Literals in existence, and the soldiers sent to capture him imply that even all of them with their guns could only irritate him, at best, if he fought back. Nonetheless, they manage to bring him back peacefully, where it is revealed Revise is actually his son, and the Pathetic Fallacy is his father. It seems that he became a mundane by choice, and doesn't refuse the notion of losing his memories again.

It later emerges in the storyline Jack's Big Book of War that Kevin has powers leading to the creation of Fables themselves, but it has not yet emerged what they actually are. It seems that Kevin refers to Fables as his creations and he consents to the revisions of his son Revise as the lesser of two evils, in an attempt to protect them from his other son Bookburner.

In The Great Fables Crossover he's revealed to be truly the creator of the Fables, the embodiment of the storytelling. Having been able to break in a new pen, after destroying the pen (a simple goose-feather) used to write the Fables (and possibly the mundys as well) in the attempt to stop the Writer's Block, he becomes displeased with the current events, as the Fables themselves had grown beyond his control (he explicitly claims that Geppetto's transformation in the dreaded Adversary was something he couldn't even fathom), and decided to uncreate them, rebuilding a new world from scratch.

After Jack Frost II is able to stop him from writing the literal word end to the universe, Dex, the Deus Ex Machina and the most powerful of the Literals, creates a new, empty universe for the Literals to inhabit and fill out as they please. Despite having a new occasion to create, Kevin expresses displeasure and worries, as after thousands of years spent dreaming the end of the universe, he's unable to write out a beginning to a new universe.

=== Pathetic Fallacy ===
The Golden Boughs Retirement Village is also home to a man known as the Pathetic Fallacy, although he comes to prefer being called Gary, who has the powers of that concept. His precise status at the facility was somewhat unclear; while he did Revise's bidding, appearing to have his trust and carry out a number of minor staff duties, he was also kind and sympathetic and aided the escape plan. It is later revealed that the Pathetic Fallacy is a Literal, an extremely powerful magical being of a different kind to the Fables, in that he personifies a literary concept rather than being a character from literature. He was the father of Kevin Thorn and grandfather to Revise, although he appears to only be aware of this on occasion.

The Pathetic Fallacy traveled with Jack Horner, taking on the role of his sidekick, being somewhat naive and frequently confused, although he had lucid moments when he shows a great deal of knowledge about how stories work. He regards inanimate objects (which are, of course, generally quite animate in his presence) as friends and talks to them frequently.

In one of his lucid moments, he refuses to join the Literals in the new universe created for them by the Deus ex Machina and willingly sacrifices his powers. Reasoning that the new universe will develop a Pathetic Fallacy when the need will arise, he returns at Jack's side.

After Jack Horner transformed into a dragon, The Pathetic Fallacy hid him in a cave where he had piles of gold. It was revealed he entered a brief marriage with a woman and sold some of the original books in exchange for cows (for Jack to eat, as opposed to other people, namely the women he brings back to the cave). When Jack Frost arrives to slay the dragon (not realizing the dragon is his biological father), the Pathetic Fallacy rushes to Jack Horner's defense, destroying the Fulminate Blade. As a result, Jack Frost shoots him, which kills him since he had been living as a Mundy.

=== Mr. Revise ===
Mr. Revise is in overall charge of the Golden Boughs Retirement Village. His exact status is unclear, but he is descended from Literals, a group of magical beings who, unlike the Fables, who are characters from story, appear to personify literary concepts. He seems to embody the concept of the editor, in that he revises the universe so that it makes perfect sense. He is the son of Kevin Thorn and the grandson of the Pathetic Fallacy, though he appears older than both of them. As such, Revise holds a considerable amount of supernatural power.

Revise considers his role to be "neutering" Fables partly by stripping them of their darker elements, with his ultimate goal being to rid the world of magic. He had been close to accomplishing that before the Fabletown refugees made their way to this mundane world.

Tying into Revise's intention to destroy magic, The Golden Bough was originally written by Sir James Frazer to show that even the "enlightened" faiths of the 19th century were descended from the most superstitious and primitive. Like Frazer, Mr. Revise appears to be a modernist who wants to abolish superstition. In the end of the Great Fables Crossover, he is revealed in a more sympathetic light, as it is mentioned that keeping the laws of physics constant over time had been his idea, making science possible. It is also pointed out that he has been a stabilizing force against whims of Kevin Thorn, who could justify any event by claiming poetic license. Eventually, he decides to follow his father in the new universe created by the Deus ex Machina.

=== The Page Sisters ===
The three Page sisters serve Revise directly as the senior librarians of the Golden Boughs Retirement Village, each with their own speciality. Robin Page is in charge of security, training the tigers and so forth, Priscilla Page handles retrievals, the capture of Fables and bringing them back to the facility, while Hillary Page runs the research department. It was revealed, in Jack of Fables #26, that the sisters have two different fathers; Hillary is the daughter of Revise, while Priscilla and Robin are Bookburner's daughters.

The Page sisters all appear to be relatively young, are attractive and all three have slept with Jack Horner, something that he takes considerable pride in having achieved, though he also shows horror after learning that they are his half sisters. Hillary spends some time traveling with Jack after his escape from Golden Boughs, but left after discovering that he'd slept with both of her sisters before her and is now helping the Bookburner, Revise's brother and the father of her two sisters, track the fugitives.

After the revelation that Jack was their half-brother through their shared mother, Prose Page, they were horrified to realize that they had committed incest. Hillary was disgusted, Priscilla was enraged, and Robin was speechless.

The sisters have some mystical abilities as a result of their Literal heritage. Libraries are Hillary's place of power, while the open road is Priscilla's. She claims to know "shortcuts to anywhere", which she uses to reach Kevin Thorn's hideout ahead of Snow White and Bigby. It is implied that all three sisters give up their powers when they decide to stay in the Fables universe instead of accompanying the other literals into the new one provided by "Dex" (Deus Ex Machina, the Literal embodiment of the dramatic concept), but Robin seems to be able to communicate with a stone lion at the end of Jack of Fables (unless she was just acting crazy and actually found another way to unlock a secret passage). The sisters decide to travel the world with their nephew, the current Jack Frost. Hillary and Priscilla appear to have motherly attitudes toward him to him while Robin seemed to be following along out of reluctance: the former later advises Jack Frost to cast aside his wintry powers and find his way by himself, thus separating from him and paving for their favorite nephew the path of the hero.

After becoming mortals, the sisters lived as normal "mundies" for years. Robin had a baby, Sammy Junior, with Sam after a one-night stand with the former Golden Boughs prisoner. The sisters eventually got tired of life as mere mortals doomed to grow old and die, and started searching for Revise's books of original, unrevised Fable stories, knowing that the original books would make them immortal once more. The search brought the sisters to a dragon, who was, in fact, a transformed Jack Horner, who had stolen the books when the Golden Boughs were destroyed. The sisters arrived at the same times as several former Golden Boughs prisoners, who were on a quest of their own, searching for Fabletown. The sisters went after the books while shooting at the dragon, which made the dragon burn the books in anger. The sisters, upset at the loss of the books, started shooting everyone around them, thinking that since they were doomed to die without the books, everyone else could just as well die with them. This made some of the Fables retaliate and all three of the sisters were killed; Humpty Dumpty fired his cannon at Priscilla, the Tin Man killed Hillary by firing a laser through her chest with his tin cannon, and the Cowardly Lion mauled Robin to death.

In Fairest: In All The Lands, it is revealed that the Page Sisters used to either live in Fabletown or visit it, as they talked to Mrs. Ford, a seer in a laundry who foresaw their death in a cave, as later seen in Jack of Fables: The End; the sisters remarked that in response, they decided to just avoid that cave, until they gave up and accepted their fate.

=== The New Jack Frost – "Jack Two" or "Jack Too" ===
His real name is Evelyn-Lawrence-Pinder-Shinks-Cobblepewter, uttered in its entirety once by his caretaker Vrumptus. Son of Jack Horner and the Snow Queen, nephew of the Page Sisters, and so one-quarter Literal and three-quarters Fable himself, Jack Frost is the estranged son of Jack Horner, conceived by Lumi and Jack when Jack Horner, trying to harness the wintry powers and the riches of the Snow Queen for himself, romanced the still naive and gullible Lumi. As a result of his predictable betrayal, Lumi hardened her heart, becoming the cold, ruthless villainess shown in the series, lavishing the young Jack with all her bottled and repressed love. It is unexplained why she would give her son such a name.

Whatever the reason is for his name, Jack shows no ill will to his mother or his caretaker Vrumptus. He seems to care for and love both as family and knows very well of his father's treatment to his mother. As a result, owing to Lumi's duties as an adviser for the ominous Adversary, young Jack lives a sheltered life along with his majordomo Vrumptus, growing into a sickly, frail child. When at the climax of the war between Fabletown and the Empire, as shown in War and Pieces, Lumi immediately falls permanently asleep because of Briar Rose's curse, her wintry powers seek Jack, turning him into the second Jack Frost (essentially a male version of the Snow Queen), imbuing him with several powers, such as the absolute mastery over cold and snow of his mother, the ability to travel between dimensions and the mystical ability to track Jack Horner. After receiving his powers one of the first things he does is to change his name which he decides to call himself Jack.

Although briefly distracted by the similarities between Wicked John and Jack Horner, Jack Frost manages to find his father at the Farm. Jack Horner, annoyed by his son's childish insistence, tricks him into believing that he must first complete a great quest before he has the right to ask his father any questions. With this objective in mind, Jack Frost takes part in the battle between Fables and Literals, ultimately turning the tide in favor of the Fables by freezing Kevin Thorn before he can write an end for the current universe. When the Literals leave the main universe to write a new one, Jack Frost stays back with his aunts, the Page Sisters, forswearing his bumbling father and unsure of his future. On Hillary and Priscilla's advice, Jack Frost divests himself of Lumi's powers, but to his great surprise, instead of returning the meek, sickly kid he was, he turns into a quite handsome young man with the stamina and physical prowess of his father and the innate ability to hop between dimensions. Joining forces with Gepetto's wooden owl, briefly tasked by the Adversary in spying the Homelands, whom he names "McDuff", he starts a career as a hero for hire, with McDuff acting as the brains of the operation, and the good-natured, courageous, but trusty and still naive Jack acting as the brawn.

=== Bookburner ===
Son of Kevin Thorn, brother to Revise and father to Priscilla and Robin Page, Bookburner takes a different approach in dealing with magic to his brother, choosing to burn books completely, effectively removing those characters from existence. He does, however, claim to keep copies in what he refers to as his 'private collection', which appears to give him power over what remains of those characters, allowing him to compel them to act on his behalf. He has not been seen since the destruction of the Golden Boughs Retirement Village.

=== The Genres ===
A group of Literals who are the embodiment of the different genres found in story telling. The known genres are:

- Western, who looks like John Wayne, he can sense Bigby's actions, because they both are sheriffs. He likes to play cards alone.
- Blockbuster, a dimwitted, musclebound commando who can sense when explosions happen, he resembles Rambo.
- Mystery, a silent woman whose face is always covered by a black veil.
- Horror, a terrifying little girl, she can even scare Kevin Thorne.
- Romance, a beautiful redhead.
- Science-Fiction, a man in a spacesuit who fights with lasers, he is twin brother to his sister Fantasy.
- Fantasy, an elven woman with pointy ears who likes to plan epic adventures finding magical items.
- Super-hero, a younger brother of Science-Fiction and Fantasy, he is known to be constantly dying and resurrected like Western.
- Literature, who holds the others in contempt.
- Noir, who looks and acts like Sam Spade as portrayed by Humphrey Bogart, he can solve some cases without needing to be physically present and he also managed to sneak up on everybody in the room, when they were summoned by Kevin.
- Comedy, who looks and acts like Groucho Marx, he makes no difference between "a muse" and "amuse".
- War, who looks and acts like a soldier from World War II.

=== Other Literals ===
- Writer's Block: Kevin Thorne's twin brother, he looks exactly like Thorne, but has the appearance of a mental patient. Though Writer's Block is always close to his brother, Thorne doesn't notice him until he accidentally touches him. In order to continue with his plans, Thorne murders Writer's Block again.
- Dex (Deus Ex Machina, the Literal embodiment of the dramatic concept), arguably one of the most powerful of the Literals, he waits to solve all problems until doing so is truly impossible. He can appear out of nowhere, but he cannot work miracles, as he can only work "once per story, usually toward the dénouement".
- Eliza Wall: A Literal and temporary narrator of the Jack of Fables series and represents the fourth wall, a theatre concept now also adapted to any storytelling device (films, literature etc.). She also has siblings - of whom nothing is known, except that, unlike her, they have no fourth wall awareness, as they do not understand it when she directly speaks to the readers.
- Prose Page: Jack Horner's mother, who gave birth to Jack after an affair with a Fable, Prince Charming. She later gave birth to the Page sisters, Hillary with Revise and Priscilla and Robin with Bookburner.
- Onomatopoeia: Little is known about Onomatopoeia, though is mentioned by Revise after escaping the Golden Boughs Retirement Village.
- Foreshadowing: Little is known about Foreshadowing but that she is a female, though is mentioned by Revise after escaping the Golden Boughs.

== The Homelands ==
=== Colonel Bearskin and "Bearskin's Free Company" ===
These were some of the Fables who died defending the Last Free Gateway from the Homelands, as seen in The Last Castle. Every year, on 15 May, the people who were on the last boat out of the Homelands would get together to drink to the memory of those who died so they could get out to the Mundy World. Among the defenders were:

- Colonel Bearskin, the colonel of "Bearskin's Free Company", the Fables who held back the Adversary's forces and tried to hold their last unconquered territory. It is said that he fought in many famous battles. He was known for his cunning battle strategies which were the reason that the territory held as long as it did. He also cared for the safety of the people who had loved ones and sent them on the boat to Fabletown. Boy Blue was his orderly, and he gave Boy Blue the witching cloak so Blue would live to tell the tale of the battle and so he could escape to be with Red Riding Hood. He was one of the last of the Fables that stayed to fight to be killed; he was stabbed in the side and died slowly while the Adversary's troops mocked him.
- The Valiant Little Tailor, identified through the text on his clothes, which says, "seven at one stroke", he was killed by goblins early in the battle. In addition, his name can be seen on one of Kevin Thorn's books in the Jack of Fables story arc The Bad Prince.
- The Red Cross Knight, who almost won the battle all on his own, and could not be beaten, "not by goblin or troll or giant. Not by the dozens or the hundreds", he was finally killed when the enemy set a dragon against him.
- Herman Von Starkenfaust, from Washington Irving's short story The Spectre Bridegroom. According to Boy Blue, he turned out not to be a ghost after all.
- Britomart: Her final action before being killed, was throwing her magical spear, which would find any target she set for it, killing the general leading the Adversary's forces.
- Robin O'The Woods (Robin Hood), a.k.a. "Loxley": When the last ship out of the Homelands was leaving, Robin Hood (previously seen in flashbacks in the Legends in Exile story arc, while fleeing the Adversary's forces) chose to stay behind and defend the Gateway, to avenge his Marian, who was killed when the invaders took his homeland.
- The Merry Men, including Friar Tuck and John Small, died side by side with Bearskin's Free Company.
- Tam Lin, who was claimed to be the knight loved by the queen of the faeries, he had a reputation of a scoundrel, but after winning a place for himself on the last ship out of the Homelands, he gave it to his young page instead.
- The King of Madagao and the King of Bornegascar, old enemies, from Fantastic Fables by Ambrose Bierce.
- The ancient King Pellinore: His rusty armor kept trying to fall apart during his weeks defending the Gateway, and his squire had to follow him around, retrieving the pieces that were dropped off in his way.

=== The Cardinal Winds ===
==== The North Wind ====
The North Wind, often referred to as Mr. North, is the father of Bigby Wolf. His real name is Boreas Frostheart, as revealed in Fables #110. When traveling the world, he fell in love with a wolf named Winter; they had seven cubs. Mr. North grew bored after several years and abandoned her. He is the only European fable that still holds his kingdom from the Adversary. He arrives in Fabletown when word reaches him about the birth of his grandchildren, and he spends several years at the farm helping Snow take care of them. He treats Snow like she was his own daughter even before she is married to his son, teaching his grandchildren how to fly and shapeshift. He is strong enough to fight Demons and is confident he would be able to beat the D'Jinn, or Genie, that Sinbad's adviser releases, though he tells Snow White and the others the battle would probably destroy most of the planet. He is based on many European wind gods, primarily Boreas (who has his own fable, entitled The North Wind and the Sun). Bigby has never forgiven him for abandoning Winter and considers him a monster. He eventually returns to his kingdom before Bigby returns to Fabletown. Following Bigby and Snow's visit to his castle, he agrees to help Fabletown during the war against the Empire by providing zephyrs trained to act as spies and messengers.

It is later revealed that Mr. North and Mr. Dark, although having different purposes, are of similar magic and power (though Mr. Dark claims to be superior). He tried to persuade Mr. Dark to leave the mundane world and the Fables alone - which Dark refused - and offered a challenge of single combat with Frau Totenkinder; it is shown that Mr. North did this in exchange for information from Totenkinder, confirmation that Snow had given birth to a zephyr, Ghost, and that he was living happily as a secret member of the family. Mr. North left, extremely displeased.

In Mr. North's kingdom, zephyrs were viewed as predatory monsters. Long ago, following a child massacre at the hands of the zephyrs, Mr. North had sworn an oath to his people that as long as he lived, no zephyrs would be allowed to survive. He was now facing a dilemma, as he loved the cubs - his grandchildren - and would never intentionally hurt any of them. Nor did he wish to further exacerbate the slight bond he had managed to form with his son. Desperately trying to find a way to get himself out of the predicament, he realized that the only way he could forsake his vow to kill Ghost was to die, as death canceled all obligations. A grim Mr. North confronted Mister Dark, the Dullahan who had sworn vengeance against the Fables and was out to kill all of them, including Mr. North's family. Knowing that the damages from a battle between the two would be catastrophic for the Fables, Mr. North grabbed Mr. Dark by the throat and brought up him up into the North Wind's own realm of elemental ice and wind, so that even the slightest brush of the Dullahan's death would not touch the world below. There, he entered his Casket of Primordial Winds (a suicide mechanism kept in case he got tired of this life, since nothing much could harm him) and took Mr. Dark with him, killing them both. When informed of Mr. North's death, Bigby felt conflicted, as he had hated his father for so long and now his father had done something so noble as this. His musings were interrupted when one of the North Wind's aides showed up and informed him that now that Mr. North was dead, a new North Wind was needed from his bloodline. Since Bigby is "entirely unsuitable", they will have to choose from among his children.

==== The West Wind ====
Brother/cousin of the North Wind, and great uncle of the "cubs", the West Wind appears as a Native American, and goes by the name of Yaponcha, the Hopi wind god from Native American legends. He is also known as Zephyrus, the Greek god of the west wind. Another reference to Native American mythology is made when he compares wolves (more specifically, Bigby) to the mythological coyote.

During the process of choosing the North Wind's heir, the three other cardinal winds arrived, intending to take possession of the "cubs". They believed that the "offspring of one of the great houses" should be fostered for a time in the courts of other kings and that the cardinal winds themselves were best suited to determine who might be the most fit to rule Mr. North's kingdom. Bigby, father of the cubs, was furious and would not allow this, and the West Wind then secretly attempted to persuade the East Wind and the South Wind to join him in taking over the North Wind's keep and kill his family, including the children. Thus, they could construct a new north wind from pure materials, but the South Wind accuses him of wanting to do this out of personal revenge on the North Wind. Both she and the East Wind remind him that he has been on bad terms with the North Wind for some years, even naming the "zephyrs" after him to insult him.

Winter, one of "the Cubs", was eventually chosen as the new North Wind. When this happened, the West Wind referred to the new situation as "a setback", but did not interfere.

==== The East Wind ====
The North Wind's brother/cousin, the East Wind takes the form of an obese man and goes by the names of Eurus (the name of the Greek deity representing the east wind), Fei Lian (the Chinese god of the wind) and Dragon of the East. He does appear to have some physical traits similar to young Ambrose. Not much is known about him, but unlike the West Wind, he doesn't appear to wish to kill the North Wind's family. Like the South Wind, he believes the West Wind only wants to hurt them out of personal spite. With coaxing from the South Wind, she got them to decide to invite themselves as guests of the Wolf Clan, but upon hearing the ideas of his fellow winds, the East Wind suggested that they not only killed the entire wolf clan, but the North Wind's attendant winds as well. The others agreed to the plan, but when Winter (one of the "cubs") is chosen as the new North Wind, the East Wind appears to accept it, and even tells a disgruntled West Wind to be quiet and mind the occasion. He also wishes to assist in Winter's training.

Winter soon becomes afraid when she starts having nightmares where she sees a grown-up version of herself as a cold, selfish North Wind that hurts people. The East Wind is very pleased with this new "marvelous" development in which they will have a "timid" North Wind, whereas the South Wind, equally pleased, says that their day of ascendancy has come at long last. During "Cubs in Toyland" arc Bigby asks as humbly as he could for their help in finding Therese and Darien. While of course all the winds at first refuse, Bigby makes a verbal threat that he'd make them pay if they didn't. It is noted, that while he's just as suspicious character as his siblings, he was the only one of them not griping or complaining about searching for them. He notes "Sometimes a doing a favor is its own reward", meaning he could have some benevolence in him at the most as he saw that while Bigby wasn't a god like them, he wasn't just an ordinary human either.

==== The South Wind ====
The North Wind's sister/cousin, and the cubs' great aunt, the South Wind takes the form of an African-looking woman. Even though all the Cardinal Winds have the ability to take the form of both genders, she is the only one of the group who's chosen to take a female form. She goes by the names of Yoruba (after the Yoruba people of West Africa), Notus (the south wind in Greek mythology) and Storm Mother. She could be considered the more compassionate and sensible one of the Winds, although she has been shown to have a more ruthless, cunning side as well.

After hearing the West Wind's ideas, the South Wind suggested that they should instead conduct themselves as proper guests until Bigby had another outburst. When that happened, they would be "fully justified" in stepping in with force. The other winds agreed to the plan, with a few modifications from the East Wind, who suggested that they not only killed the entire wolf clan, but the North Wind's attendant winds as well. The West Wind and the South Wind both agreed. Later, it becomes clear to the winds that the testing might place the children in mortal danger, and the East Wind remarks that if the cubs are killing themselves in the process of testing, the fewer the winds will have to take out when they are compelled to step in. The South Wind reminds the others that their patience is paying off and that they were right to hold off taking a direct hand.

One of the "cubs", Winter, is eventually chosen as the new North Wind. The South Wind watches in silence and appears to accept the new development, but Winter becomes very afraid when she starts having premonitions of her older self as a cold and selfish North Wind that hurts people. The East Wind refers to the new development as "marvelous" because the new North Wind will be timid, and the South Wind appears to be very pleased and answers that "our day of ascendancy has come at long last".

=== Arabian Fables ===
A group of characters living in the Arabian Fable homelands, mostly from One Thousand and One Nights.

==== Sinbad ====
Sinbad, the famed mariner of legend, is a prince of the Arabian Fables. He arrived in Fabletown during the Arabian Nights (And Days) story arc, accompanied by his minister, Yusuf, a host of servants and slaves and, to the consternation of his hosts, a d'jinn secured within a bottle, for a meeting carefully negotiated by Mowgli. Things got off to the worst possible start when Prince Charming forgot completely about the meeting and it was only when King Cole, who both spoke the language and was familiar with the customs, was brought in that things began to calm down. As things progressed, Sinbad began to see that the mundane world represented a new beginning, and decided to free all of his slaves. The enraged Yusuf used this as an excuse to release the d'jinn, giving it commands that would put him in control of both the European and Arabian fable communities. Fortunately, Frau Totenkinder had anticipated the possibility and warped his language, so that the commands he gave were not what he intended, ultimately leading to his own prolonged demise and the recapture of the d'jinn. Sinbad did indeed release his slaves, giving them the option to either accompany him back to Baghdad or to remain in Fabletown. He left Fabletown, taking King Cole with him as the official Ambassador to the Arabian Fables. They returned to Baghdad, where he revealed to Cole that, for the time being, the Arabian Fables still live in the Homelands equivalent of Baghdad, until such time as the Adversary's forces take it. Sinbad has learned from the uncontrolled exodus of the European Fables into the mundane world and has made plans to ensure that their own escape, should it prove necessary, will be much more orderly.

During the War and Pieces storyline, Sinbad participated bravely in the war against the Adversary, commanding the skyship Glory of Baghdad, with Prince Charming as his combat coordinator. After the destruction of the ship, he defended the injured Charming while the latter dragged the last bomb to its target and set it off. After the war, he married Rose Red, who divorced him around a week after their wedding to try to be with Boy Blue. Following a failed attempt to reconcile, he returned to Baghdad, expressing a wish to build a new airship with which to explore the liberated homelands.

==== Aladdin ====
The Arabian Fables' best spy, ostensibly acting under the orders of Sinbad, Aladdin is seen briefly learning English in preparation for the war against the Adversary. He is later seen in Dubai, disguised as a concierge in the Burj al-Arab hotel, holding a knife and preparing to attack an oblivious Cinderella, as seen in Cinderella: From Fabletown with Love. Both end up working on the same spy job together, looking for the ones who are selling magical contraband. They eventually discover it is the three girls from Sinbad's harem and find they are in dealing with Cinderella's own Fairy Godmother. Cinderella eventually defeats her grandmother with the help of Hickory and leaves with Aladdin. She reveals she knows about him spying on the other Fable-communities, but states she'll keep quiet because she's attracted to him. Aladdin returns her feelings and they decide to spend a night together.

==== Ali Baba ====
Ali Baba was briefly mentioned during the Arabian Nights (And Days) storyline. He also appears in the first storyline of the Fables spin-off Fairest, where the famous prince of thieves makes his way to the Imperial Capital in the Homelands. The city has recently been burned down by goblins. While looking for treasures hidden among the char and ash, he finds a magic bottle, which he opens, but the bottle does not contain a d'jinn, but a little bottle imp. Although the imp cannot grant him three wishes, it promises to lead him to great riches. The imp leads him to the encampment of the goblins who burned down the city, and where Briar Rose, still asleep, is being held. The imp explains to Ali Baba that the sleeping girl is blessed with eternal wealth and riches, but needs to be woken with true love's kiss from a prince, and that if Ali Baba marries her, he will get everything she gets. Ali Baba sneaks into the camp, and finds both Briar Rose and, Lumi, the Snow Queen, also asleep. Since he doesn't know which woman the imp meant, he first kisses the sleeping Snow Queen. When that doesn't work, he kisses Briar Rose, who awakens from the spell, along with the Snow Queen.

The Snow Queen, wanting revenge on Briar Rose for putting her to sleep for years, takes both of them captive, but does not harm them. While Ali Baba and Briar Rose are forced to spend time with Lumi, Ali Baba eventually realizes that he has no feelings for Briar Rose after all, but is in love with Lumi. It is revealed that because Ali Baba risked his life to wake and rescue Briar Rose, his actions fell under the definition of true love, but was not romantic love. Lumi likes and is attracted to Ali Baba, and believes that love can grow from that. The two become a couple, and start a new life together in Lumi's homeland, but this is only temporary, as both of them are killed during the events of the Fairest graphic novel Fairest In All The Land at the hands of Goldilocks. Cinderella was able to bring Goldilock's victims back to life, but she could only pick half of the victims to resurrect, and she chooses Lumi, feeling she was a victim at the hands of the Adversary, and a potential ally for Fabletown.

==== Other Arabian Fables ====
- Yusuf: Sinbad's minister who released a d'jinn from a bottle, in order to destroy Fabletown and its citizens and put him in control of both the European and Arabian fable communities. Frau Totenkinder used her magic powers to warp his language, so that the commands he gave were not what he intended, ultimately leading to his own prolonged demise and the recapture of the d'jinn.
- Sidi Nouman: The first victim of the d'jinn released by Sinbad's servant, Yusuf, as seen in Arabian Nights (And Days). He appears in the One Thousand and One Night story "The Caliph's Night Adventure" (as Sidi Nu'uman), which includes the chapter "History of Sidi Nu'uman". The d'jinn makes references to the story by calling Sidi Nouman "famous abuser of horses", "celebrated husband of corpse-eaters" and "a dog who's occasionally a man - or is that the other way around?". The Fables Encyclopedia erroneously states that Sidi Nouman was created by Bill Willingham.
- King Shahryār: In the graphic novel 1001 Nights of Snowfall, Snow White is dispatched to the Arabian sultan's court in the Homelands to enlist his support in the fight against the Adversary. King Shahryār entraps her, and for a thousand-and-one nights in a row, she must tell Shahryār a story, each time stopping at dawn with a cliffhanger, thus forcing him to keep her alive for another day so that she can complete the tale the next night, while at the same time wooing his cooperation.
- Scheherazade: She makes a brief appearance in 1001 Nights of Snowfall. It is revealed she got the idea of telling the Sultan a new story every night from Snow White, who has been using the same trick herself to keep herself alive for a thousand-and-one nights while acting as an ambassador for Fabletown.
- Scheherazade's father: He makes an appearance in the graphic novel.
- Aladdin's father and the d'jinn: From the tale of Aladdin, mentioned in Cinderella: From Fabletown with Love.
- Morgiana: Referred to in the Fairest story arc Wide Awake.
- Abd Al Qadir: He appears briefly in flashbacks from Ali Baba's life, in the Fairest story arc Wide Awake. He is a minor character referred to in the One Thousand and One Night story "Ala al-Din Abu al-Shamat", during the "Two Hundred and Fifty-third Night" (as Abd al-Kadir).

=== The Blue Fairy ===
The Blue Fairy was the one who turned Pinocchio into a real boy centuries ago. She took his wish too literally and made it so that he would be a real boy, therefore never growing up and experiencing puberty. She lent Geppetto some of her power in order for him to turn more of his puppets into real people, but soon she saw how greedy Geppetto was becoming, and started resisting. This prompted Geppetto to trap the Blue Fairy and use machinery to drain power from her body so he could use her power on his own.

Pinocchio stated early on he only went to Remembrance Day celebrations to see when the Blue Fairy would show up, and that he would "kick her pretty little azure ass" whenever she did. Many years later, in the early period of the power struggle over the Farm, Ozma brought the Blue Fairy to the Farm, obviously wanting revenge on Geppetto for his wicked deeds. The Blue Fairy tried to attack Geppetto, but was interrupted when Pinocchio attempted to beat her up, wanting revenge for being stuck as a boy for centuries. She quickly overpowered him and went after Gepetto, but the Sheriff, Beast, intervened and managed to talk the Blue Fairy into going away for 777 days, at which time she promised to return and expected Beast to have Geppetto ready and waiting to receive her vengeance. If not, she was going to take Beast prisoner for 777 years.

Later, Beast is able to stall her by saying that Gepetto wishes to marry her. The Blue Fairy chooses the Lady of the Lake as her intermediary in the wedding negotiations. In the Fairest graphic novel Fairest In All The Land, the Blue Fairy and the Lady of the Lake both become victims of a serial killer, who is revealed to be Goldilocks. Cinderella is able to resurrect the victims, but can only bring back half of them, and chooses the Lady of the Lake over the Blue Fairy. The Blue Fairy is cast into what the Magical Mirror calls the "stay dead group", meaning even the mirror does not expect her to be resurrected.

=== King Arthur and Camelot ===
King Arthur and his court appear in flashbacks during The Good Prince story arc, where the spirit of Sir Lancelot tells his story to Flycatcher. Camelot and the fabled King Arthur set the standard of "true chivalry" for all of Christendom and its legend touched much of the pagan worlds beyond. The Fables graphic novel 1001 Nights of Snowfall reveals that Lancelot, Camelot's most gifted champion, was blessed by Frau Totenkinder, who told him that he would be unbeatable in battle as long as he remained pure and honorable. Lancelot was unbeatable, until he lost his honor by having a love affair with the King's wife, Guinevere. The Knights of the Round Table are referred to in Lancelot's story, and Gawain makes an appearance. Lancelot's betrayal, and the "unforgivable acts" that he perpetrated afterward, split the Round Table and led to the downfall of Camelot. Even though Arthur eventually forgave him, Lancelot couldn't forgive himself. He hanged himself and became the mysterious Forsworn Knight who appears in the early issues of Fables. Dialog between Flycatcher and Lancelot's ghost reveals that Arthur was eventually laid to rest in a crypt. Arthur appears briefly in flashbacks during the Fables story The Destiny Game. According to the Fables Encyclopedia annotations, "Sir Grimauld" from The Good Prince is Bill Willingham's creation, as there is no such character in the King Arthur mythos. Based on the color of his armor, he may be the Green Knight from the poem "Sir Gawain and the Green Knight" (circa A.D. 1390).

King Pellinore makes an appearance in the Fables story The Last Castle, as one of the defenders of the last free gateway.

The Lady of the Lake was first referred to in The Good Prince and the Jack of Fables story arc The Bad Prince (in addition, Arthur, Lancelot and Merlin are all referred to in the latter story). She first appears in the story arc The Destiny Game. Also known as the "Green Lady", she is a messenger of the Fates and has the ability to assign and reassign different destinies to particular individuals. She is a green-skinned woman who sometimes lives in ponds. Initially a sly and conniving woman, she turns more diligently after two encounters with Bigby Wolf. Years later, she is in a well-established relationship with Bigby's cub Ambrose. In later Fables story arcs, Lady of the Lake was shown to be a good friend to the Blue Fairy and came to represent her friend in the engagement to Geppetto. In the Fairest graphic novel Fairest In All the Land, Lady of the Lake and her friend were attacked and apparently murdered at the hands of Goldilocks. Cinderella was able to bring Goldilocks' victims back to life, but was only allowed to choose half of the victims to resurrect, and she chose Lady of the Lake over the Blue Fairy.

Merlin appears briefly in flashbacks in the Fables story The Destiny Game.

Uther Pendragon, Gorlois and Mordred are mentioned in Fables #136 (Camelot, Part 6). In addition, Arthur's half-sister, Morgan le Fay, is one of the 13th floor witches of Fabletown.

=== Dunster Happ ===
Dunster Happ is a warlock and former Boxer (hunter of rogue spellcasters and magical beings) for the Empire. Though he did not invent the sealing boxes used by the Boxers to capture their targets, he was able to enchant them so that they would entice their targets to enter them willingly. He had been key to boxing Baba Yaga, Mr. Dark and the last of the Baleful Hernes. Frau Totenkinder (after rejuvenating and using her true name again: Bellflower) asks him to teach her how to box Mr. Dark, despite her initial concerns that such boxes may have been made to capture her as well. During their time, Totenkinder apparently seduced him and became his lover. They would develop a deep relationship and would become engaged. They later came back to The Farm. In the Fairest graphic novel Fairest In all the Land, they were both killed at the hands of the murderous Goldilocks. Cinderella could only pick half of Goldilocks' victims to resurrect, and ultimately chooses Totenkinder over him.

=== King Valemon and his royal subjects ===
Various characters from Norwegian Folktales, as seen in the Cinderella: From Fabletown with Love story arc.

- King Valemon and his queen, rulers of Ultima Thule, one of the Fable Homelands, they were deposed of and killed when an unknown, powerful magic user from another realm invaded their kingdom. The usurper eventually turned out to be Cinderella's fairy godmother. Among the people still loyal to King Valemon include:
- Askeladden, now without his ship.
- Butterball, always hungry.
- Mrs. Gudbrand, widow of the late Gudbrand from Gudbrand on the Hill-side, whose home has become a refuge for dissenters still loyal to the old king.
- Little Freddy, from Little Freddy with his Fiddle, now without his musket.
- Little Annie the Goose-Girl.
- The ram and pig from The Ram and the Pig Who Went Into the Woods to Live by Themselves.

=== The people of Oz ===
A group of Fables from the books of L. Frank Baum, living in the Fable Homelands of Oz and Ev (the Nome King is listed under "Villains"). In addition, the Tin Man and the Cowardly Lion are prisoners at the Golden Boughs Retirement Village in the mundane world.

==== Jack Pumpkinhead ====
Jack Pumpkinhead's first appearance was early on in the series, in flashbacks during the Legends in Exile story arc, where he can be seen among a large group of Fables fleeing the Adversary's forces. His next appearance took place almost a hundred issues later, in the Fables story The Ascent, where he is on the run from the Nome King's (now the ruler of a pan-Ozian empire) enforcers in the Fable Homeland of Ev. It is revealed that he was drafted into one of the Nome King's press gangs, but eventually managed to escape with Bungle the glass cat and the Sawhorse. While sitting in one of Ev's native Lunch Box Trees, Bufkin accidentally saves the group from a couple of "Rumble Tumble Tom's", the Nome King's enforcers. The group joined forces with Bufkin, and went on to appear in the subsequent Fables story arcs, working to overthrow the Nome King.

==== Bungle, the Glass Cat ====
At some point, Bungle, the Glass Cat escaped into the mundane world and became one of the helpers of Dorothy Gale, a killer for hire. Bungle was later recruited by Dorothy to aid her in her quest for revenge on her nemesis, Cinderella, as seen in Cinderella: Fables are Forever. Bungle assisted in kidnapping Cinderella and Ivan Durak of Shadow Fabletown and brought them to the Deadly Desert of Oz in an airship. Ivan seemingly manages to overpower their captors and throw Bungle and the other captors out of the ship, rescuing Cindy and himself. Bungle is shown floating down in a parachute, indicating that she's working with Ivan. In a surprising plot twist, it is revealed that Dorothy was Ivan all along, disguising herself using her magic slippers.

Bungle's story continues in the Fables series. After Bungle landed, she was drafted into one of the Nome King's press gangs, building a road across the deadly desert. She managed to escape with Jack Pumpkinhead and the Sawhorse, also in the press gang. Bufkin came across the group in the Land of Ev, and accidentally saved them from the Nome King's enforcers, who were chasing the fugitives. All four of them then secretly formed a secret resistance movement.

==== Other Oz-characters ====
- The Sawhorse: One of several Oz-fable who's ended up in the Fable Homeland of Ev while on the run from the Nome King's enforcers, he joins Bufkin's revolution.
- The Spoon Brigade from The Emerald City of Oz: Recruited by Dorothy to aid her in her plot for revenge on her nemesis, Cinderella.
- One of the Chiss: Also recruited by Dorothy, they are creatures the size of a Volkswagen, covered in poisonous quills which they can shoot out of their body at will. They can only be found in Oz. Dorothy brought one of the Chiss to the mundane world to aid her in her quest for revenge on Cinderella. When Cindy set out find Dorothy, she encountered the creature in Thailand. The creature killed Meng Chiang-Nu (from the Chinese folktale Seeking Her Husband at the Great Wall) of Shadow Fabletown, and then attacked Cinderella, who was forced to kill the creature in self-defense.
- The Wicked Witch of the East, assorted munchkins, the Wizard of Oz, the Wicked Witch of the West and the Good Witch of the North: They appear briefly in flashbacks from Dorothy's adventures in Oz. In addition, several allusions to the Wicked Witch of the West are made in the Witches story arc.
- Glinda the Good: She appears briefly in flashbacks from Dorothy Gale's adventures in Oz, in Cinderella: Fables Are Forever. In Fables #4, there is a brief flashback from the exodus from the Homelands, where an unnamed character is shown flying in a swan-drawn chariot while fleeing the Adversary's forces. In the books, Glinda is said to ride a fancy chariot driven by swans or storks. Although the figure appears to be a woman, a closer inspection reveals that the person is wearing a hood, and what appears to be a mane of long flowing hair is actually part of the chariot. Annotations in the Fables Encyclopedia speculate that this may be Apollo.
- Winged monkeys: All working in the Nome King's air corps, one of the monkeys discovers Bufkin's group of revolutionaries in Ev, and is subsequently killed by Bufkin.
- The Yoop: From The Patchwork Girl of Oz, now working in the Pan-Ozian administration of the Nome King who freed him from his prison. The Nome King feeds his enemies to the Yoop, who eventually got tired of his job as the Nome King's "people eater", feeling that he could not keep up with the large number of people being fed to him every day. He was sent out to capture Bufkin, Jack Pumpkinhead, Bungle the Glass Cat and the Sawhorse, but decided to join their revolution instead.
- A group of Kalidahs: Also working for the Nome King, they joined Bufkin's revolution because they were tired of being made to sleep in filthy cages when off-duty.
- General Blug, with his fifty thousand soldiers: From The Emerald City of Oz, Jack Pumpkinhead, Bungle the Glass Cat and the Sawhorse attempt to recruit Blug and his troops in their revolution.

=== Other Homelands Fables ===
- The Jabberwock: Mentioned in the Legends in Exile and Homelands story arcs, and like in the Jabberwocky poem, the vorpal sword was the Jabberwock's bane.
- Don Quijote and his squire Sancho Panza: They appear briefly in flashbacks during the Legends in Exile story arc.
- The Great Lion: According to the Fables Encyclopedia annotations, this is a reference to Aslan from The Chronicles of Narnia. The Kingdom of the Great Lion was one of the Fable Homelands that was conquered early on, as seen in flashbacks during Legends in Exile. The lion himself was felled and killed by arrows. King Cole points out that the lion was "a bit too pompous and holier-than-thou for our tastes". The Great Lion also appears in an illustration for The Good Prince, where the ghost of Sir Lancelot refers to the lion as "the Great Lion on his stone" (Aslan sacrificed himself and was killed on a stone table) and one of the "true kings". Bill Willingham has commented on the issue: "Narnia is my favorite fantasy series, bar none. (...) Problem is, Narnia isn't in the public domain, so we couldn't use it in Fables. So who is the lion mentioned in that one panel [in Legends in Exile] and what kingdom is depicted? I can't say it's Aslan and I can't say it's Narnia. But that doesn't stop any of you from looking at the first lines of this paragraph and coming to your own conclusion".
- Thumbelina's mother: Referred to in the Fables story Barleycorn Brides.
- Count Aucassin de Beaucaire: From Aucassin and Nicolette, he is a general leading the Adversary's attack on the Last Free Gateway from the Homelands, as seen in The Last Castle. He was killed by Britomart's magical spear.
- Maid Marian: Mentioned in the story The Last Castle, she was killed when the invaders took Robin Hood's homeland. According to annotations in the Fables Encyclopedia, she is the woman by Robin Hood's side in flashbacks during the Legends in Exile story arc.
- The Queen of Fairies: Also mentioned in The Last Castle. Apparently, Tam Lin, one of the defenders of the last free gateway, was loved by her.
- Jack's mother: From Jack and the Beanstalk, she is mentioned in the March of the Wooden Soldiers story arc, the Jack of Fables story arc The Bad Prince and in The Great Fable Crossover. In The Bad Prince, it is revealed that Jack Horner is actually an unknowing copy of Wicked John and that John was actually the one involved in the Beanstalk and Giant-killing incidents, thus making the woman the mother of Wicked John, not Jack. Jack's real mother is Prose Page, who is also the mother of the Page Sisters.
- The man who sold the magic beans to Jack (or actually Wicked John): Referred to in March of the Wooden Soldiers and the Jack of Fables story arc The Bad Prince.
- Chernomor: From Ruslan and Lyudmila, a Governor-General in the Adversary's empire, he was killed by Boy Blue during Blue's exploits in the Homelands. After his death, Blue impersonated the governor, ordering his underlings to lower the tax rate.
- Mice and cat from the Russian lubok The Mice are Burying the Cat: As seen in the Homelands story arc, during Boy Blue's exploits in the homelands, Blue comes across the strange group in the Rus, the Homelands version of Russia. A train of mice are pulling a sleeping cat on a sledge, saying that they are planning a funeral for the cat. When Blue points out that the cat isn't dead but merely sleeping, the mice reply that "nevertheless, we have our plans".
- The Three Knights of the Rus: Baba Yaga's servants. They appear in the fairy tale "Vasilisa the Beautiful", from Alexander Afanasyev's Narodnye russkie skazki. They were defeated in single combat by Boy Blue.
- Ivan Tsarevich is mentioned by Boy Blue when he was in Rus.
- Trusty John's king: Mentioned in the Fables story Meanwhile, where is revealed that long before John signed the Fabletown compact, he had sworn an unbreakable vow of loyalty to his King, who he believed had been killed leading his forces against the Adversary. This would turn out not to be the case and John's King was now actually working for the Adversary. The King contacted John and ordered him to spy on his fellow Fables. John was bound by his vow, which overruled the later compact, and had no choice but to obey and spent four years passing information to the enemy before Kay caught him.
- Solomon: Referred to as Sulymon the Wize in the comic, he appears in a brief flashback from ancient times during Arabian Nights (and Days). He is also mentioned in 1001 Nights of Snowfall and the Witches story arc. Sulymon was the one who invented the idea of tricking a d'jinn into a bottle.
- Daedalus: He appears in a brief flashback from ancient times during Arabian Nights (and Days). He was the greatest sorcerer-scientist of that age, and was the inventor of the magic bottles used to capture d'jinns.
- The Seven Dwarfs: They first appeared in flashbacks in the Fables prequel 1001 Nights of Snowfall. In the story, Prince Charming is investigating a series of murders around his kingdom. The victims are revealed to be the Seven Dwarfs, whereas the killer turns out to be Charming's wife, Snow White. The flashback sections of the Rose Red story arc reveals that unlike in the fairy tale, the dwarfs treated Snow badly and turned her into their slave, abusing her physically and sexually. It is also revealed that the dwarfs were the sons of the dwarf from Snow White and Rose Red. More flashbacks are seen in the Camelot story arc, where it is revealed that Snow White was their prisoner for several years. The story also shows what actually happened when she killed one of them.
- Princess from The Frog Prince: Appearing in flashbacks from Flycatcher's story in 1001 Nights of Snowfall, she also appears as a ghost before Flycatcher in the Fables story "Jiminy Christmas".
- Red Riding Hood's grandmother: Appearing briefly in flashbacks from Bigby Wolf's story in the March of the Wooden Soldiers story arc and 1001 Nights of Snowfall, she and Red Riding Hood survived being eaten because of the magic in them.
- The Farmer's Wife: Mrs. Sprongwallow appears in flashbacks in 1001 Nights of Snowfall. Her husband, the farmer, was killed when the Adversary invaded her homeland, the kingdom of Old King Cole.
- Hansel and Gretel's parents: Referred to in the Sons of Empire story arc, unlike in the fairy tale, Hansel and Gretel did not go home after burning Frau Totenkinder, realizing that their "wicked parents" had meant for them to die out in the Black Forest.
- The Gingerbread Man: Appearing in the Sons of Empire story arc and in the story Waking Beauty, he works with Mr. Porky Pine and Chicken Ripple to steal unguarded pies being put out on a windowsill (or other places) to cool. Another gingerbread man can be seen on the Farm in the story Kingdom Come, when the Fable animals are asking Boy Blue questions about Haven.
- Mr. Porky Pine and Chicken Ripple: Their names are taken from the lyrics of Neil Diamond's song Porkupine Pie (from the album Moods). They appear in the Sons of Empire story arc and in the story Waking Beauty. Porkupine Pie is also the name of the duo's chapter in Sons of Empire. Mr. Porky Pine and Chicken Ripple were two Fables in the Homelands who had banded together with the Gingerbread Man to steal unguarded pies being put out on a windowsill (or other places) to cool. Mr. Porky Pine once convinced a human girl to give him a big kiss, claiming he was an enchanted prince. After the girl ran away with both hands stuck by needles, he explained to the Gingerbread Man and Chicken Ripple that he was actually cursed by a witch, only the curse was, in his own words, a perverse attraction to human women. In the Fables story In Those Days, it is revealed that the porcupine was cursed by a young Frau Totenkinder: Mr. Porky Pine angered Totenkinder by calling human women ugly, and she threw a curse on him that made him desire only human women.
- Radiskop: The Fables version of Ratatoskr, the squirrel from Norse mythology who lives on Yggdrasil, the tree that spans the world. He appears in the Fables story Happily Ever After, where he works as a messenger for Cinderella.
- The Headless Horseman: He ran into Jack Horner during Jack's Jack O'Lantern days, as seen in the Jack of Fables story Jack O Lantern. Jack, needing something for holding a hot piece of coal given to him by the Devil ("Old Scratch"), steals the Horseman's "head" pumpkin.
- Natty Bumppo ("Hawkeye"): One of Bookburner's men, in the Jack of Fables story arc Americana, an angry Bookburner sends him and Slue-Foot Sue after Jack and his group. They eventually managed to shake them off. Bookburner can also be seen holding up a copy of Natty Bumppo's story, the Leatherstocking Tales.
- Slue-Foot Sue: One of Bookburner's people, in the Jack of Fables story arc Americana, an angry Bookburner sends her and Natty Bumppo after Jack and his group. They eventually managed to shake them off. Her husband, Pecos Bill, is a prisoner at the Golden Boughs Retirement Village.
- Giants from Jack and the Beanstalk: They appear in flashbacks in the Jack of Fables story arc The Bad Prince.
- Omar: A creature resembling an anthropomorphic, two-legged dromedar, who is a soldier in Bookburner's army of Forgotten Fables, which attacked the Golden Boughs Retirement Village.
- Till Eulenspiegel: He was abducted by Max, The Pied Piper Of Hamelin, in Peter & Max: A Fables Novel. Max later mentioned that all of the abducted children died horribly - two of the youngest were sacrificed by Frau Totenkinder to maintain her youth and keep her magical powers, while all the others were sold to various masters (whatever happened to them before their death is unknown).
- MacBeth: Jack Frost Two has read works of "fiction" and "fact" about MacBeth and he called his new owl friend after MacDuff. Incidentally, one of his quests involves a cow named Gertrude (like Hamlet's mother).
- Freddy and Mouse: Based on the Fritz Leiber characters Fafhrd and the Gray Mouser from the Lankhmar series, a pair of adventurers who unleashed and were enslaved by Mr. Dark.
- Cinderella's stepmother and -sisters: They appear briefly in a one-panel flashback in Cinderella: From Fabletown with Love.
- Robin Redbreast: Jenny Wren's lost love, mentioned in Cinderella: From Fabletown with Love, from the nursery rhymes "Jenny Wren Fell Sick", "Little Robin Redbreast" and "Cock Robin Got Up Early", he was murdered when the Adversary invaded Jenny Wren's homeland.
- The seven fairy godmothers from Sleeping Beauty: Their names were Katrya the Pure, Sofiya the wise, Nyura the Graceful, Ionna the Gifted, Alyas the Noble, Yeva the Lively and Leysa the Defender. They appear in the Fairest story arc Wide Awake. In Cinderella: From Fabletown with Love, it is implied that Briar Rose and Cinderella share the same fairy godmother, but this is proven apocryphal in the Fairest.
- King and queen from Sleeping Beauty: They appear in flashbacks from Briar Rose's life in Fairest.
- Rapunzel's prince: He appears in flashbacks in Cinderella: From Fabletown with Love, and the Fairest story arc The Hidden Kingdom. It is revealed that it was Cinderella's fairy godmother who showed him the way to Rapunzel's tower. Rapunzel and the Prince shared a passionate love affair, which resulted in Rapunzel becoming pregnant. She then spent months trying to find him, but unbeknownst to her, the fairy godmother now forbade the prince to contact Rapunzel, as the godmother had "plans for" her.
- Baleful Hernes: Apparently a reference to the Wild Hunt, the last of their kind (presumably Herne the Hunter) was boxed offscreen by Dunster Happ during his "Boxing Days".
- Kermit the Frog: Either he is a cheerleader/mascot who does not need a costume, or an actor is impersonating him, during the Frog Prince's baseball matches in Haven, as seen in the story Out to the Ball Game.
- The Scorpion and the Frog: One of the Scorpion's brothers, Ollikandar Strikeswift, appears in the story Out to the Ball Game, and both the Frog and the Scorpion, Gallifar Strikeswift, are mentioned. The brother's testimony plays a pivotal role when a murderer is trialled in Haven, in front of Flycatcher. It was unclear if the Scorpion's existence was genuine fact or pure myth, even within the Fables themselves (besides, the original tale itself was subject to ambiguity, as it is usually wrongly attributed to Aesop).
- In the Rose Red story arc, several characters from the fairy tale Snow White and Rose Red appear in flashbacks from Snow White's and Rose Red's childhood:
  - Lauda: Snow White and Rose Red's mother, who masquerades as nothing but a poor widow, but is secretly a powerful witch who descends from a line of cursed magical women. Her status is currently unknown, but she is believed to be dead.
  - The wicked dwarf: The father of The Seven Dwarfs.
  - The eagle: After the girls save the dwarf from the eagle, the eagle is angry and says that for one of them, seven evils await, for the other, the loss of one dear.
  - Brandish, the bewitched prince.
  - Holben, the prince's brother: Unlike in the fairy tale, the prince does not marry the Snow, nor does his brother marry Rose; Holben makes it clear that he has no wish to marry Rose Red, and their father, the king, is against letting Brandish marry a common peasant girl.
- The Evil Queen: Mentioned in Storybook Love and appearing in flashbacks in the Rose Red and Camelot story arcs, the queen is actually Snow White's and Rose Red's paternal aunt (the sister of their father). It was revealed in the "Rose Red" story arc that in the past Lauda helped her to achieve the position of queen in a distant land. The "Happily Ever After" story arc states that she killed her brother; it is not clear whether or not Lauda knew of this or what her motivations for doing this were. When Snow's mother is forced to send Snow away, she arranges for her daughter to live with her aunt. Years pass, until the queen is one day told by the magical mirror that Snow is lovelier than her. Even though the queen promised Lauda that she would love Snow dearly, the queen orders her huntsman to secretly kill her niece. The hunter spares Snow and she flees deep into the forest. The Queen eventually discovers that Snow White is alive by consulting the magic mirror. Cloaking herself in the guise of an old woman, she visits the cottage of the seven dwarfs and gives her a poisoned apple. Snow eats the apple and falls into a deep coma, but Prince Charming's love is enough to overcome the poison, since all nobles of that world had some degree of magic in them. What happened to the Evil Queen has not yet been revealed.
- The World Turtle: Once the queen of a great kingdom in the Fable Homelands, when the king discovered that she was being unfaithful, he punished her by turning her into a turtle. He transformed her soul into a teacup of delicate ceramic, which she had to carry on her back. The cup contained her entire homeland, an archipelago of "surging seas and sun-dappled islands", and all of its people. If she let the teacup fall or break, her people and her homeland would be destroyed, and her soul would be lost. Her horrible trial would end when she found a heroine of low station willing to trade places with her. The heroine would then become the new queen, and the turtle a new peasant.
- Aunt Em: Dorothy Gale mentions her in Cinderella: Fables Are Forever, saying her aunt always said "you should find something you love to do and then do it". Dorothy, having killed two witches and liking it, was inspired to become a killer for hire.
- Prince Lindworm: He was executed by the Imperial General Mirant when Lindworm attempted to make himself the new Emperor in the wake of the defeat of the Adversary. He came back to life when his head was reunited with his body by his loyal goblin troops.
- Coyote: This mythological character is mentioned by the West Wind in the story arc Inherit the Wind, in which he (Coyote) is described as "cunning".
- The Little Match Girl: One of Hope's paladins and the caretaker of Hope Deferred, Rose Red meets the little girl on Christmas Eve in the Fables story "All in a Single Night", where Rose is taken "worlds away", in a Fables takes on A Christmas Carol. The Little Match Girl is still making a living selling matches. Rose asks her to get out of the cold, or else she'll die. The girl answers that she has no home and many matchstick bundles yet to sell. Rose says to her that she will die tonight, as in the fairy tale, but the girl answers that no one knows what will be and that she is young and can stand the cold. She speaks of her hopes for the future, and hopes that her (future) children will have a better life than her. Rose is heartbroken, because she knows that the girl will freeze to death, with all her hopes unfulfilled.
- The false bride from the fairy tale The Goose Girl: Another one of Hope's paladins and the avatar for the Hope of Revenge, she wanders at the edge of the living world, night after night, never to know rest. She explains to Rose Red that "all those good men and women" had their revenge on her; for her crimes, they locked her in a barrel, pounded iron spikes though it and sent her tumbling down the cobbles to her death. The people who sentenced her to death are lying in their graves, but each Christmas Eve, they are freed from their resting places and allowed to walk about as ghosts. They all hope to be released from their confinement and pass on to "rewards long delayed", but the false bride tells Rose that they hope in vain, because "they attend me and I'll never dismiss them". In addition, The Goose Girl is one of the fairy tale books seen in Kevin Thorn's home in the Jack of Fables story arc The Bad Prince.
- Ryogun: Based on the jealous samurai from Japanese urban legend of Kuchisake-onna, and the samurai that killed Okiku in the Japanese ghost story Banchō Sarayashiki, he appears in flashbacks from the Fairest story arc The Hidden Kingdom.
- Tomoko: A female kitsune who had a passionate love affair with Rapunzel in the Fairest story arc The Hidden Kingdom, Tomoko kept her soul outside her body in the foxfire that burned beside her bed. The Shogun manipulated the Emperor of The Hidden Kingdom into banishing Tomoko and all her kind from the kingdom. The Shogun confiscated Tomoko's foxfire and used it to bend the emperor's will.
- Various funa yurei from Japanese folklore. Hundreds of years ago, Rapunzel tried to kill herself by sailing off the edge of the world and was washed up on the shores of the Fable homeland The Hidden Kingdom. The funa yurei, the spirits of the drowned, rescued her, and brought her to safety.
- Various tanuki, they were banished from the Emperor's court, as part of the Shogun's plan for laying the way for the Adversary to invade. According to Rapunzel, "no one minded too much. They were smelly, drunken, pesky little bastards".
- Various oni: They were residents of the Hidden Kingdom who were seen banishing other mystical creatures from the Emperor's court on the shogun's order. They were later seen among a group of creatures who had been exiled from the court, indicating that they were eventually banished themselves.
- Various kappa, who were banished for the same reason. The Shogun claimed that they were "a terrible influence" and "violent monsters".
- A Japanese dragon appears as a background character in the Hidden Kingdom in Fairest #11.
- Sorcerer Atlantes from Chanson de Geste and Orlando Furioso, he strikes a deal with the Green Lady in order to obtain a fantastic destiny but later gets betrayed by her. He mentions getting trained by Ulmore the Uncanny, which is a reference to Bill Willingham's earlier story "Thieves of Daring" where Ulmore is the legendary last Atlantean Sorcerer.
- The Fates appear briefly in flashbacks in the Fables story The Destiny Game.
- Various Valkyries appear during The Destiny Game, escorting fallen warriors to Valhalla.
- Romulus and Remus appear briefly in flashbacks in the Fairest story arc The Hidden Kingdom.
- The Minotaur appears briefly in flashbacks in the Fairest story arc The Hidden Kingdom. It is revealed that it was actually Rapunzel who entered the Labyrinth and slew the beast, while searching for her lost children.
- Various kirin: They are referred to in Fairest #11, another group banished by the shogun. After he took control of The Hidden Kingdom, he started hunting them for sport.
- Nalayani: From the epic Mahabharata, Nalayani is the main character of the Fairest story arc The Return of the Maharajah. When her village is attacked by a group of talking dholes, she joins forces with the provincial Maharajah, who turns out to be none other than Prince Charming. Charming falls in love with her, but although she is fond of him, she does not want any emotional entanglements for the time being. She ultimately chooses to come with him after he relinquishes his title and travels back to Fabletown.
- Tabaqui: From Rudyard Kipling's The Jungle Book, the golden jackal appears in The Return of the Maharajah. He was Nalayani's companion for during her journey to the Maharajah's palace. She was forced to kill him when he became infected with rabies.
- Nathoo: From Kipling's Jungle Book, Nathoo appears in The Return of the Maharajah, as Maharajah Charming's servant and companion. It was Nathoo who found Charming after the bomb went off in the Fables story arc War and Pieces (where Charming was presumed dead). When Charming decides to go back to Fabletown, he makes Nathoo the new Maharajah.
- Buldeo: The chief hunter of the local village from Kipling's Jungle Book and another aide of Maharajah Charming, he is eventually killed by wild animals.
- Various Asuras appear in flashbacks in The Return of the Maharajah. They came down from the mountains and attacked Maharajah Charming's palace, although Charming's forces were able to drive them away.
- A Pishacha: This flesh-eating demon appears, unseen, in flashbacks in The Return of the Maharajah. It possessed a child and then ate all the people in her village.
- Childe Roland from Childe Roland to the Dark Tower Came: Mentioned in Fairest In All the Land.
- Padarn Beisrudd: Referred in Fairest In All the Land, his coat is in the possession of Fabletown.
- Various magicians who were boxed away by the Boxing League, appear in the final story arc, Happily Ever After. The Boxing League were the Emperor's army of highly specialized combat sorcerers, who were tasked with locking up any magician and magical creature who did not directly serve Geppetto's empire, because they were a potential threat to the Adversary's monopoly on power. Several years after the fall of Geppetto's empire, the boxes mysteriously sprung open and the prisoners were released. For unexplained reasons, they were drawn to Rose Red, and were absorbed into her body, in order to serve as members of her army. These magical beings include:
  - Ragana: Goddess of trees from Lithuanian mythology.
  - Slogutis: A personified nightmare from Lithuanian mythology, he was released along with Ragana.
  - The grindylow [misspelled as "grindlylow"]: From folktales in the English counties of Yorkshire and Lancashire, released along with Black Shuck and Habetrot.
  - Black Shuck: The ghostly black dog said to roam the coastline and countryside of the East Anglia region of England.
  - Habetrot: A figure in folklore of the Anglo-Scottish border counties of Northern England and Lowland Scotland.
- Baobhan sith: From Scottish mythology. Appearing in the Fables story arc The Boys in the Band, she subjugated a group of monsters who plagued the Fable Homeland Hybernia, and set herself up as their witch queen, before taking control of the land and declaring herself the new queen in the wake of the Adversary's defeat. She was eventually defeated.
- Various Cu sith: From Scottish mythology, servants of the Baobhan Sith.
- The Lumberjack from The Honest Woodcutter appears in flashbacks in Fable: The Wolf Among Us. The Woodsman stole Lumberjack's clothes and axe.

== Inmates at the Golden Boughs Retirement Village ==
=== Little Black Sambo ("Sam") ===
Mr. Revise did such a good job of revising Little Black Sambo's story that Sam has grown into an old man and few people remember him. He still managed to escape during the mass breakout from the Golden Boughs by turning all of Robin Page's tigers into butter. This upset Mister Revise greatly, as he viewed Sam as one of his greatest successes. According to Revise, Sam's story was "censored, shunned and forgotten by the oversensitive mundys". In The Great Fables Crossover, Kevin Thorn summoned Sam along with Hansel, hoping they could inspire him in writing his masterpiece. After numerous disagreements, Sam eventually dumped Hansel out of his wheelchair and off a cliff. He then attempted, unsuccessfully, to put an end to Thorn's plans by stealing his magical pen. During the final Jack of Fables story arc, it is revealed that he has become a father to a little baby boy, Sammy Junior, as a result of a one-night stand with Robin Page. Sam is one of the few regular characters who survives the Jack of Fables final issue.

=== The Tin Man ===
The Tin Man was first seen in flashbacks during the Fables: Legends in Exile story arc, while fleeing the Adversary's forces. In the Fables spin-off Cinderella: Fables Are Forever, it is revealed that he, along with the Cowardly Lion, Dorothy Gale and Toto made it into the mundy world in the year of 1943, having been on the run from the Adversary's forces for years. The Tin Man and the Cowardly Lion decided to live out on the Jersey pine barrens rather than staying at the Farm, while Dorothy went on to live as a killer for hire among the mundys. At some point years later, all of them were captured by Mr. Revise's people and imprisoned at the Golden Boughs. The Tin Man used to have all sorts of appendages attached to his body, including tin cannons, a rotating saw and a large drill, which were all removed when he was revised. When Bookburner attacked the Golden Boughs, Mr. Revise reluctantly allowed many of the revised Fables to be restored back to their original self, and the Tin Man magically got all of the appendages back. In the final issue of Jack of Fables, the Tin Man and many former prisoners are caught in the middle of a confrontation between Jack Frost Two and Jack Horner, who has been turned into a dragon. Jack Frost believes that the Tin Man is on the dragon's side and kills him by chopping off his head.

=== The Cowardly Lion ===
Like several other Oz-characters, the Cowardly Lion was first seen in flashbacks during the Fables: Legends in Exile story arc, while fleeing the Adversary's forces. In the Fables spin-off Cinderella: Fables Are Forever, it is revealed the Lion, along with the Tin Man, Dorothy Gale and Toto, was on the run from the Adversary's forces for years, before the group made it into the mundy world in the year of 1943. The Cowardly Lion and the Tin Man decided to live out on the Jersey pine barrens rather than staying at the Farm, while Dorothy went on to live as a killer for hire among the mundys. At some point years later, all of them were captured by Mr. Revise's people and imprisoned at the Golden Boughs. When Mr. Revise reluctantly allowed the revised Fables to be restored back to their original self, and the Cowardly Lion learns that he was actually vicious lion looking for restraint before he was revised. In the series' final issue, in a chaotic battle with Jack Horner, who has been transformed into a dragon, the Lion dies when he is caught in Jack's dragon fire.

=== Humpty Dumpty ===
Humpty Dumpty, also known as Mister D, is a giant egg who can blast away like a cannon, who fought in the Homelands version of the Battle of Colchester. This is a reference to the history of the nursery rhyme; "Humpty Dumpty" was originally the name of a big cannon used during this battle.

Humpty attempted to escape the Golden Boughs again and again until he finally succeeded during the mass breakout orchestrated by Jack, only to get himself shattered when blasting several of Robin Page's tigers. Since Humpty had promised to lead Jack to a hidden treasure, Jack took the Humpty Dumpty parts with him, and did the impossible by putting Humpty Dumpty back together again, using copious amounts of super glue. They found the treasure eventually, but Humpty was captured by Bookburner and forced to join him in his march against the Golden Boughs. After he got himself broken again, Bookburner had him resurrected as an evil version of his former self. Apparently, Humpty recovered, and was back as his old self again in the final Jack of Fables story arc. He was killed when Hillary Page fired her rifle-mounted grenade launcher in a chaotic fight in the final issue of Jack of Fables.

=== Paul Bunyan and Babe the Blue Ox ===
Paul Bunyan used to travel the length and breadth of his Fable Homeland of Americana, with his trusty blue ox at his side. He has been shrunk down to a smaller version of himself by Mr. Revise, but still grows in size when he is angry or when he gets closer to Americana. When Hillary Page cooked up a plan to venture in Americana, she blackmailed Bunyan to go with her, and both were captured by Bookburner when they reached their destination. Bookburner killed Bunyan by burning Bunyan's book and had him resurrected as one of his loyal soldiers, resulting in Bunyan's ox was left on its own. Bunyan was seemingly killed when Gary the Pathetic Fallacy unleashed his powers on him when Bookburner's army attacked the Golden Boughs.

Babe the Blue Ox was transformed into a miniature ox by Mr. Revise after Babe and Bunyan were caught trying to escape the Golden Boughs during the mass escape orchestrated by Jack Horner.

=== Wicked John ===
Wicked John is a man who is the spitting image of Jack Horner, except the dark hair. He used to be best friends with Raven and is shown several times trying to get Alice's attentions, though she is clearly disgusted by him. It is revealed that Jack Horner was never involved in the Beanstalk or Giant-killing incidents, but is actually an unknowing copy of Wicked John. Upon Wicked John's death, some great power decided to write him back into the stories, but got his name wrong, thus creating Jack Horner. John was later revived, and now both Fables exist.

Gary the Pathetic Fallacy informs Jack of the facts after a mysterious, old man shows up and plunges the sword Excalibur through Jack's chest (and dies shortly thereafter). Jack, who can't get the sword out, is delighted with the news, since this means that the sword was really meant for John, the "real" version. Jack is able to pull Excalibur out of his chest and impales John with it, before leaving John behind.

In the final story arc of the series, it is shown that John has been at the Grand Canyon, the place where he was left behind, for at least two decades, still living with the sword stuck in his chest. He is now being used as a tourist attraction as the "Impaled Wild Man". It appears no one's really tried making real interaction with him, beyond trying to pull out his sword for fun. Due to this treatment, he has lost some of his mental stability and has become somewhat delusional. Eventually, he has enough of being an attraction and makes a long journey to find Gary the Pathetic Fallacy. He does eventually find Jack, who has been transformed into a dragon, and Gary. At the same time, Jack Frost Two arrives to slay the dragon Jack, not knowing that the dragon is his father. Gary, rushing to Jack's defense, pulls the sword right out of John in order to defend Jack, and Wicked John dies from the injuries.

=== Raven ===
Raven is a Native American who can turn into a raven and is guided by a bird spirit. He is referred to as a trickster figure, which is true to the mythology. During his time as a prisoner at the Golden Boughs, the spirit instructed him to stay close to the copy of Jack of the Tales. Raven, like so many others, believed that Wicked John, who was the spitting image of Jack except from his dark hair, was a copy of Jack Horner, and Raven and John became close friends. After the mass escape from the Golden Boughs, it was revealed that John was the original Jack of the Tales and that Jack was actually the copy. After hearing the news, Raven chose to leave John behind and become Jack's companion instead, since the spirit had specifically instructed him to befriend the copy and not the original. Staying true to the trickster figure mythology, he was close to turning his back on Jack more than once when trouble arose, but the bird spirit convinced him otherwise, reminding him that he was supposed to help Jack. Jack and Raven's ways eventually parted after the destruction of the Golden Boughs, when Raven chose to stay with a group of former prisoners.

Decades later, in the final story arc of the series, the spirit comes to Raven in a dream and tells him that he has forgotten his purpose in life, which is to protect Jack Horner. The spirit commands him to gather together every ally he can muster and save Jack Horner, who, unbeknown to Raven, has been transformed into a dragon. Raven tells the others that the bird spirit has shown him the way to Fabletown, and the group sets off to find the place. The group follows the spirit for days, until they reach their destination, finding themselves in the middle of a battle between Jack Frost Two and Jack the dragon. Raven lies to the others and convinces them to protect the dragon, saying the dragon is the only one who knows the secret way to Fabletown. Everyone soon realizes that they have been tricked when Jacks kills several of them, believing that they are out to steal his treasure. The Page Sisters also show up, and are devastated when Jack burns the books of original Fable stories that they have been looking for. Upset at the loss of the books, which the sisters needed to restore their immortality, they start shooting everyone around them, mortally wounding Raven.

=== Alice ===
Alice spent much of her time inside the Golden Boughs fending off the advances of Wicked John, a man she openly despised. She managed to escape with John Henry and Pecos Bill during the big breakout, and the group briefly accompanied with Jack Horner, who told them the story behind his identity as Jack Frost. Jack made a joking pass on her, but Alice rejected him. She was last seen in the Golden Boughs during Bookburner's attack, where Mr. Revise gives her a copy of her original story, an act that is supposed to grant powers back to the character that had been stripped away. Whatever abilities Alice had returned to her, however, were never shown.

Alice was not seen among the Fables who left the Golden Boughs together after its destruction, and she was not present during the series' finale, indicating that she may be one of the few who survived the series. In the series' final story arc, the Page Sisters come across several books of the original Fable stories (from before they were revised by Mr. Revise), one of which is called "Alice's Adventures Beyond the Grave" (this may or may not indicate that she might be able to return to the living, even though she may or may not have been killed like almost every one in the Jack Of Fables series).

In the Jack of Fables series, Alice is wearing her classic knee-length dress with a white pinafore, but the dress is red rather than blue. Like in the drawings of John Tenniel, her hair is blond. In the story Jack Frost, she also is seen wearing the striped stockings and wide ribbon from the illustrations of Through the Looking-Glass.

=== Toto ===
The Fables spin-off Cinderella: Fables Are Forever tells the story of how Toto, along with Dorothy Gale, the Tin Man and the Cowardly Lion, escaped to the mundy world during the 1940s. While the Tin Man and the Cowardly Lion decided to live out in the woods rather than at the Farm, Dorothy took Toto with her when she left to live as a killer for hire among the mundys. At some point, Toto was captured by Revise's people, presumably when Dorothy was captured in the year of 1986.

Toto attempted to flee the Golden Boughs during the mass escape orchestrated by Jack Horner, but was killed and eaten by one of Robin Page's tigers. Dorothy remarks that she's kind of relieved, since this is the first time "that flea-bitten mongrel has quit yapping in a hundred years", but as Priscilla Page points out, "killed Fables often get magically replaced by new versions of the same Fables", and a new version of Toto shows up, alive and well, by Dorothy's side in Oz in Cinderella: Fables Are Forever. It is unknown what became of him after Cinderella kills Dorothy in the Deadly Desert.

=== Lady Luck ===
A blonde who feeds on people's luck by eating their brain. She fled the Fable homeland Americana in order to escape Bookburner, and settled in Las Vegas in the mundane world. In Vegas, she had lucky casino winners kidnapped so that she could use them for her grisly rituals. She left a string of bodies in her wake, but was eventually captured by Revise's people and taken to the Golden Boughs. Lady Luck was one of Goldilocks' revolutionaries, who believed Bookburner and his army was coming to save them from their captivity at Golden Boughs. Ironically, it was Bookburner's army that shot the revolutionaries down when they finally did arrive. Apparently, she survived, as she cropped up in the final Jack of Fables story arc. She was shot and killed by the Page Sisters in a chaotic battle in the final issue of Jack of Fables. She remarked that it was "not [her] lucky day".

=== Other inmates ===
- The Walrus and the Carpenter were killed in the chaotic fight at the end of the Jack of Fables series; the Carpenter is killed by Jack Horner, who has been transformed into a dragon, and the Walrus dies when a van falls on top of him.
- The little oysters from The Walrus and the Carpenter, who apparently were not eaten after all. The oysters were killed in the chaotic battle in the series' finale; some were stepped on by Jack Frost Two, and the others were shot down by the Page Sisters.
- The Black Sheep and boy from Baa Baa Black Sheep.
- Little Tommy Tucker, seen when Sam shows Jack up to his cottage and as one of the Fables escaping during the mass breakout orchestrated by Jack Horner.
- The Cat and the Fiddle, the only character from Hey Diddle Diddle who does not live at the Farm.
- The cat with bagpipes, the mouse and the bumblebee from the nursery rhyme A Cat Came Fiddling out of a Barn. The trio can be seen when Sam shows Jack up to his cottage and is later among the Fables escaping during the mass breakout from the Golden Boughs.
- Black Caroline, from Edmund Dulac's story White Caroline and Black Caroline, in Edmund Dulac's Fairy Book. The cottage that Jack moves into is referred to as "Black Caroline's old place".
- Goldilocks
- The family and some of the cats from the poem As I Was Going to St Ives. When the cats escape from the sacks, Gary the Pathetic Fallacy animates the sacks to go catch the cats again. Some members of the family can be seen escaping the Golden Boughs during the mass breakout.
- Revised versions of the Tortoise and the Hare, who still like to race, although the Hare usually wins. Another version of the duo exists at the Farm; Jack claims that they are Mr. Revise's spies and that the Golden Boughs duo is the real one. It is unknown whether he is telling the truth or not. The Tortoise is apparently killed when he is run over by a truck in the series' final issue, by a truck titled "Lepus", which is the scientific word for hare.
- The Jersey Devil: A background characters in Jack of Fables #3.
- Kiviuq and his Polar Bear: Kiviuq, once a fearless warrior and, in his own words, "a trickster greater than any the world has ever known", he was reduced to a shadow of his former self after his story was revised, but was eventually restored back to his original self (and got his polar bear back) along with several other Fables. After the destruction of the Golden Boughs, Kiviq and Cuchulainn set out on a quest to find Fabletown; it is unknown if they succeeded.
- Revised versions of the Butcher, the Baker and the Candlestick-Maker. Another version of the trio lives in Fabletown; Jack claims that they are Mr. Revise's spies and that the Golden Boughs trio is the real one, but IT is unknown whether he is telling the truth or not. They were killed by Jack Horner the dragon at the end of the series.
- Mother Goose, now a real goose, due to the mundys confusing her name. She speaks only in rhymes. She is yet another inmate killed in the series' finale, when a van lands on top of her.
- Cuchulainn, who lost most of his strength after being revised. When Mr. Revise allowed Cuchulainn's original story to be restored, the spear of Morrigan magically appeared back in his hand. After the destruction of the Golden Boughs, Cuchulainn and Kiviuq set out on a quest to find Fabletown; whether they did succeed remains unknown.
- The Caterpillar: A violet/pink caterpillar, which may or may not be The Caterpillar, is shown eating a leaf while Humpty Dumpty tries to convince Jack to let him escape with the others.
- Mustardseed, Cobweb, Peaseblossom and Moth from A Midsummer Night's Dream. Jack became their great hero after he, inadvertently, saved them from a boggart back in the Homelands. They assisted Jack in the mass breakout from the Golden Boughs.
- Lola and Doris the Cottingley Fairies, a lesbian couple who also assisted in the escape.
- The Tooth fairy, who likes to horde teeth and has a morbid fascination with the process of losing them. She even sleeps on a bed of teeth.
- Dorothy Gale
- The Scarecrow, previously seen in flashbacks during the Fables: Legends in Exile story arc, while fleeing the Adversary's forces with the Tin Man and several other Oz-characters.
- Assorted Munchkins
- John Henry, who managed to escape with Alice and Pecos Bill during the big breakout from the Golden Boughs. The group briefly accompanied Jack Horner, who entertained them with the story behind his identity as Jack Frost.
- Pecos Bill: His wife, Slue-Foot Sue, is one of Bookburner's people. Bill escaped with Alice and John Henry during the big breakout from the Golden Boughs. The group briefly accompanied Jack Horner, who told them his story behind his identity as Jack Frost. He is present in the series' end battle, and is presumably killed off-screen.
- The Mad Hatter, the March Hare and the Dormouse, they joined Goldilocks' attempted revolution when Bookburner marched against the Golden Boughs. They changed their mind when Bookburner's army started shooting the revolutionaries down, and decided to make a run for it instead. The Mad Hatter and the March Hare are killed by Jack the dragon in the series' final battle. The Dormouse is not present, and his fate is unknown.
- Carl the fourth of the "Three Little Pigs", who made a house out of cloth. He was Snow White's "favorite of The Four Little Pigs", prior to being eliminated from the story by Mr. Revise before he could find out what happened to his brothers, temporarily making Colin Snow White's "favorite of The Three Little Pigs". He is shot and killed by the Page sisters in the series' chaotic end battle.
- Wy'east, Klickawit and Loo-Wit: Three Native Americans imprisoned in a hidden cave deep beneath the Golden Boughs, as a sort of self-destruct mechanism. After the Bookburner's strike on the Golden Boughs, Jack, his fellow Fables, the Literals and the librarians were forced to release the prisoners, who unleashed a roaring volcano upon escape, marking the end of the Golden Boughs Retirement Village. They are based on Wyeast, Klickitat and Loowit from Native American mythology.
- Wynken, Blynken, and Nod, seen in The Great Fables Crossover.

== Other characters ==
=== Flycatcher ===
Flycatcher, or Prince Ambrose, and later King Ambrose, is based on the Frog Prince and first appeared in Fables #1 (July 2002). Fables artist Mark Buckingham has stated that Flycatcher is his favorite character and also said that he is the only truly innocent character in the series.

=== Hope ===
Hope is one of the great powers, belonging to the same group as Mr. Dark and The North Wind. Just like others of her kind, she has her own personal magic box artifact, her Pandoran jar. The character, who is from the story of Pandora and Pandora's box, has appeared in several stories; she is the mysterious being who serves as an adviser to Snow White and Rose Red, taking the form of Colin Pig, Boy Blue and Snow and Rose's mother (from Snow White and Rose Red). Her true form is first seen, briefly, in an illustration for the Rose Red story arc, when Dunster Happ explains about the great powers. Earlier in the same story arc, Rose asks the spirit to show her true form, which it does, but the reader doesn't get to see what Rose sees. Hope's identity as the spirit is revealed in the final issue of the Super Team story arc, where she explains to Rose Red that hope is neither destiny nor strategy, but that she tries to champion those who can direct their hopes into actions. Hope has several paladins working for her, including Santa Claus, The Little Match Girl, and the false bride from the fairy tale The Goose Girl.

=== The Devil(s) ===
A group of Devils that Jack Horner made a deal with to prolong his life in the Jack of Fables story "Jack o' Lantern". According to the final issue of Jack of Fables, they are all the Devil.

- Old Nick: An old hermit living in a swamp, Jack first ran into him during the American Civil War, where Jack beat him in a game of cards.
- Old Scratch: A man with pointy ears who wears a carnival-like red suit. He is the same Devil as in the legend of Stingy Jack.
- Pan: One of the gods of Ancient Greece, whose appearance (a man with two horns on his head and hooves instead of feet) led some Westerners to identify him with the Devil. He claims that he is the real Devil and that Old Scratch is "just an uncredentialed upstart in a badly stitched suit".
- Lucifer: The banished angel who became the Devil, he is described by Jack as being "poncy". Heavily based on the version of the Devil in John Milton's epic Paradise Lost.
- Chernobog: The devil from Modest Mussorgsky's composition Night on Bald Mountain. His home, Bald Mountain, is identified as a place in the Fable Homelands. Chernobog is eager to show off his nature as an embodiment of evil.

=== Red Riding Hood ===
Red Riding Hood was one of the many Fables unable to escape the Homelands when the Adversary invaded, but unlike many of the Empire's subjects, she appears to have been spared of any violence and was allowed to live quietly in her cottage, where she would often remain undisturbed for long periods. Her peaceful life was occasionally disrupted by summons to the Warlock's Hall, where, unbeknownst to her, magical fetches of her were created, allowing another to take her form in order to infiltrate groups that were against the Adversary. An unnamed sorceress used her form to infiltrate the citadel at World's End during the Fables last stand in the Homelands, and during her stay she became romantically involved with Boy Blue. The sorceress's eventual fate is unknown. More recently, Baba Yaga used her form to infiltrate Fabletown in preparation for an invasion by the Adversary's Wooden Soldiers. Shortly after the incident, Boy Blue went on a covert mission in the Homelands, which eventually resulted in him finding the real Red Riding Hood. Despite her not being the version of Riding Hood that he had fallen in love with, Boy Blue brought her back to Fabletown in order to protect her from the Adversary's possible wrath. Upon arriving in the Mundane world, Red Riding Hood was meant with considerable animosity from the other Fables and was treated with undue hostility, due to Baba Yaga's previous assault on Fabletown. Upset by her cold reception and confused by the conventions of the modern world, Red latched onto Boy Blue for support, up until Blue was forced to leave for the Farm to serve his sentence there. She subsequently became close to Flycatcher, who was asked by Boy Blue to look after her while he was gone. She soon fell in love with him for his kind heart and thoughtful nature, though she had trouble expressing her love for him, and was often jealous when she thought pretty Fables were flirting with him.

Red attended Bigby and Snow's wedding with Flycatcher, but she failed to recognize Bigby as her old foe, though she did admit that he looked oddly familiar. After returning, she ventured out into the mundane city to get a makeover, hoping to attract the attention of Fly. Her plan backfired when Flycatcher, shocked by her new appearance and intimidated by his attraction for her, ran away and reverted to his frog form. After Ambrose's humanity and memories were restored by Santa and the spirit of his deceased wife, he fell into a severe depression. At first, Riding Hood tried to be understanding of Flycatcher's state of mourning, checking in on him every so often to bring him food. However, after realizing Flycatcher was allowing himself to starve to death, Red scolds him for giving up on life and encourages him to take action rather than waste away. Red's message led Fly to start his journey through the Witching Well and to eventually form the Haven. During Flycatcher's heroic quest, Red Riding Hood, along with many of Fly's other friends, regularly watched Flycatcher's adventures through the magic mirror in the business office, which they dubbed "Fly T.V.". While everyone else watched Fly's journey with excitement, Red Riding Hood was wracked with anxiety and feared for Flycatcher's life, often bemoaning the amount of danger that Flycatcher often found himself in. She kept his favorite hat with her at all times, hoping to return it to him when his quest was over. After Fly's kingdom was established and became safe, Boy Blue brought Red along with him so she could move there. Upon arriving, she told Fly that she would fill in the roles of Royal Hostess and take on queenly responsibilities until Flycatcher could find himself a proper queen. The two continued to fall in love, though Flycatcher still denied his feelings for her out of fear of betraying the memory of his dead wife. During the Out to the Ballgame arc, Fly finally acknowledges his feelings for Riding Hood and kissed her, which accidentally turns him back into a frog. Riding Hood, tired of living in the shadow of Flycatcher's former wife, tells him that he has let his guilt rule him for too long, and that it is keeping him from finding happiness in the present. Flycatcher, convinced by Riding Hood's words, attempts to take control of his curse and changes himself back into human form. Later that evening, tired of being alone, he asks Red to share his bed with him, to which she delightedly accepts.

In the epilogue chapter, "The Last Story of Flycatcher", Red Riding Hood is revealed to have eventually married Flycatcher and had at least four children with him, and is living a peaceful life as queen of Haven.

=== The Tourists ===
The Tourists are a group of three Fables who originally worked for Bigby Wolf on keeping track of those Fables who have chosen not to live in Fabletown or up at the Farm. Since Bigby's departure, they now work for his replacement, Beast.

==== Mowgli ====
The first Tourist is Mowgli, from The Jungle Book. He is assigned the mission of tracking down the missing Bigby and bringing him back to Fabletown. While this is outside the Tourists' normal duties, he accepts the mission when Prince Charming informs him that his friend Bagheera, imprisoned for his role in the Farm revolt, would be freed once his mission was completed. Mowgli is primarily given this assignment because, unlike the other Tourists, he was raised by wolves, and thus knows how Bigby would think. The task takes many months and covered thousands of miles, but Mowgli is ultimately successful. During The Good Prince, Mowgli replaces King Cole as ambassador to Baghdad, as well as running an English-language school for Arabian Fables participating in the war against the Empire.

==== Feathertop ====
The second Tourist is Feathertop, the animated scarecrow from a Nathaniel Hawthorne short story. He appeared in "A Wolf in the Fold", a prose tale in the series' first trade paperback, where he accompanies Snow White on her mission to invite the Big Bad Wolf to join them in Fabletown in approximately 1650. He was chosen because, as an entity made of straw and vegetation, the Wolf would be unable to read his emotions and would find him unpalatable. His identity as one of the Tourists is confirmed in Cinderella: From Fabletown with Love, where he appears in silhouette in a single panel. In the follow-up series, Feathertop is the head of the Shadow Players, a black ops group that tries to keep the nastier side-effects of the Everaftering from destroying the world.

==== The Woodsman ====
Bill Willingham has identified the third Tourist as being the Woodsman from the tale of Little Red Riding Hood. He appears in flashbacks from the fairy tale in the March of the Wooden Soldiers story arc and the Fables graphic novel 1001 Nights of Snowfall. In addition, all of the tourists are shown in silhouette in Cinderella: From Fabletown with Love, but not referred to by name. The Woodsman is also mentioned in The Great Fables Crossover, in which Bigby implies that he still harbours vengeful feelings for him and is just as mad at him as he is at Jack (which does mean a lot) and that his current whereabouts are unknown. The Woodsman makes an appearance in the prequel adventure video game The Wolf Among Us.

=== Tommy Sharp ===
Tommy Sharp was a writer for the Daily News. He somehow got wind that there was something unusual about the Fabletown community and spent several years following it up. He tracked down records detailing the Fables' possession of the area right back to when the city was called New Amsterdam, compiled a number of personal histories and located photographs of several of the Fabletown residents going back to the beginnings of photography, proving that none of them had aged a day. He also secretly trailed Bigby Wolf, a not unimpressive feat, given the Wolf's massively enhanced senses and witnessed him changing to his wolf form in Central Park. In the story A Two-Part Caper, Sharp came to Fabletown and asked to speak to Bigby, with the aim of giving the Fables a chance to respond to his story prior to publication as a journalistic courtesy. Explaining to a visibly amused sheriff that he believed them to be vampires, Sharp stated that he would shortly be publishing his story.

The concerned Wolf, realizing that even if nobody official believed the story, they'd be inundated with goths and vampire-wannabes, quickly formulated a plan to steal all of Sharp's research, using Briar Rose's enchantment to put all the occupants of the building to sleep while they ransacked his apartment. It quickly became apparent, however, that Sharp had backed all his information on the internet. Bluebeard, who was supposed to be keeping watch downstairs, insisted that they should simply shoot Sharp, belittling Bigby when he chose a different course of action. Kidnapping Sharp, the Fables took a number of photographs of him posed with Pinocchio, in such a manner to make it appear that Sharp was a pedophile. They then informed Sharp that if he published his story, they would release these photos, plus a videotape of an interview with Pinocchio where he explained what Sharp had supposedly done to him by pointing out on a teddy bear where Sharp touched him, thus destroying Sharp's reputation completely. Sharp had no choice but to cooperate.

Bluebeard, however, felt differently. Believing, as always, that he knew best and probably in no small part to spite Bigby, he summoned Sharp to Central Park where he asked Sharp if he had destroyed all his research; when Sharp confirmed he had, Bluebeard executed the journalist.

=== Santa Claus ===
Stationed at the North Pole, Santa Claus is a Fable who can magically be at every house in the world at the same time on Christmas night. Following an attempt by Jack Horner to steal the naughty and nice list in 1956, Santa has left the list with Bigby to put in a safe place every year since. He is said to be one of the most powerfully magical of the fables, and plays an important role in beginning Flycatcher's quest to restore his Homelands kingdom. It is also implied by Rose Red that Santa is the guardian of a gateway from the Homelands. Santa has also been revealed to be a Paladin of Hope, specifically the Hope for Justice, and the Hope for Reward as well as the hope that everything will turn out all right in the end, claiming that this is why Christmas takes place at the end of the year. He is also a vassal of the North Wind, and he taught Winter how use her powers to be in more than one place at a time. Winter also asked him to expand Christmas to all worlds that are under her sway, or are known to her.

- Mrs. Claus
- Santa Claus's reindeer, who are intelligent, capable of speech and can magically fly.

=== Gretel ===
After Hansel and Gretel's misadventure in the Homelands involving Frau Totenkinder, whom the children pushed into her own oven, Hansel and Gretel emerged from the Black Forest to find their land overrun by the Adversary's forces. They fled, staying ahead of the invading armies and taking sanctuary in one church after another until they learn of the mundane world. Arriving there in the mid-17th century, they made their way to the newly established Fabletown, where they were shocked to discover Frau Totenkinder among the Fables already present. When informed that, under the terms of the Fabletown Compact, Totenkinder had been granted amnesty for her actions in the Homelands, a disgusted Hansel announced his intention to live among the mundane population, leaving his sister behind in Fabletown. Many years later, Hansel visited Fabletown, asking to see his sister, begging her to leave Fabletown. Gretel refused, explaining to him that she has spent time studying with Frau Totenkinder in the intervening years and has gained a new appreciation for the magic arts, seeing them not as the devil's work, but as a useful tool. Horrified and enraged, Hansel struck her viciously with a chair, snapping her neck instantly. As a result, Hansel was stricken from the Fabletown Compact and banished forever. Gretel's body was cast down the witching well. Her spirit remained there in a sort of limbo for centuries, until Flycatcher, his memory restored and finally ready to face his past, went down the well, finding all the ghosts of those who had previously been thrown there. Gretel was one of the many spirits who were given flesh and blood and followed Flycatcher to Haven.

=== Civilized Apes ===
In Jack'n Apes of Jack Of Fables, Jack Horner claims that his own adventures inspired Edgar Rice Burroughs to write the whole Tarzan legend (which would then mean that either Tarzan does not exist in the Fables series, or he was just Jack) and that, in turn, inspired Jack to go to Hollywood, which led to the creation of his own series. Apes and monkeys he claims to have met are:

- Kong, a gorilla.
- Magilla, a gorilla.
- George, a monkey.
- Jane: From whom Tarzan's Jane has been inspired, according to Jack.
- "Clint the orangutan": A possible reference to the pet orangutan Clyde of the Clint Eastwood films Every Which Way but Loose and Any Which Way You Can.
- "Edgar the other orangutan": Presumably the murderous orangutan from Edgar Allan Poe's short story The Murders in the Rue Morgue.
- Aesop: Presumably the ape of Aesop's Fables The Wolf, the Fox and the Ape and The Apes and the Two Travellers.
- Saunders: A sock monkey and a possible reference to A. A. Milne's Winnie the Pooh; a sign over the door at Pooh's house says "Mr. Sanders", the name of the person who resided at the very address prior to Pooh making it his house. Winnie the Pooh and several other characters from the books were actually based on the stuffed toys of Milne's son. In addition, a character looking remarkably similar to Winnie the Pooh (but drawn slightly differently, as Winnie the Pooh is currently under copyright) can be seen in flashbacks from the Homelands, barbecuing marshmallows with Saunders in what appears to be the Hundred Acre Wood.

=== Shadow Fabletown ===
A network of hidden Fable communities, scattered throughout the world, as seen in the Fables spin-off Cinderella: Fables Are Forever. Among the Fables of Shadow Fabletown are:

- Ivan Durak, a character from Russian folklore, is one of many Fables who fled the Fable homeland of Rus when the Adversary invaded, and escaped into the mundane world, adopting the Soviet Union as their new home. At some point, perhaps after a failed attempt to kidnap Snow White in the 1980s, he was killed and Dorothy Gale assumed his identity. She may have most likely killed him, herself, after her escape from Golden Burroughs Community.
- Tugarin Zmeyevich, a dragon who can take the shape of a man, he is the ruler of Shadow Fabletown in Russia.
- Meng Chiang-Nu, a character from Chinese folktales, is an old woman who is the former head of the Shadow Fabletown in China. According to Cinderella, Meng Chiang-Nu sought her husband at the Great Wall, went through a lot of trouble to get him buried after he died, and ended up turning into a fish. She refused to give up when an emperor and his whole empire told her no. Meng Chiang-Nu was killed by a Chiss, when she was about to tell Cindy how to locate Dorothy Gale.
- The Seven Chinese Brothers: The associates and possible bodyguards of Meng-Chiang-Nu, from the anonymously written Chinese folktale "The Five Brothers" (circa A.D. 300). In some versions of the story, there were seven, or even ten, brothers. In the west, the tale was popularized by Claire Huchet Bishop's Five Chinese Brothers (1938), and Margaret Mahy's Seven Chinese Brothers (1889) more or less permanently changed the number of brothers to seven in the West.
- Anansi, a West African Fable who is a high-ranking member of one of the hidden shadow Fable communities, he may have been part of Dorothy's schemes to trap Cinderella. What became of him afterward was never stated.

=== Japanese Fables ===
A group of characters and creatures from Japanese folklore, they live in a hidden Fable community in Tokyo, as seen in the Fairest story arc The Hidden Kingdom.

- Kuchisake-onna, the slit-mouthed woman from Japanese urban legends, appears in the Fairest story arc The Hidden Kingdom. Her real name is Mayumi. Before the Adversary's invasion, she was a member of the Heika's court in the Fable Homeland of the Hidden Kingdom. Unbeknownst to her, the Seii Taishogun was secretly laying the way for the invasion and planned to become the new ruler of the Hidden Kingdom. He offered to make her Mayumi his Empress, but she rejected him and called him "a parasite on the court". He responded by slitting Mayumi's cheeks in anger. Unable to live with her face mutilated like that, she committed seppuku (a form of Japanese ritual suicide by disembowelment) - "or someone faked it". Her ghost began lurking in the washrooms and corridors of the Heika's palace, haunting mirrors. Eventually, she managed to take on a physical form and escaped the Homelands with a group of yokai who had been banished from the court. The group started a new life in a hidden Fable community in Tokyo. Centuries later, she has become the enforcer of Tomoko, a powerful female kitsune who is a Yakuza leader. Mayumi wears a surgical mask to hide the disfigurement. She enjoys scaring people by asking them, "Am I beautiful?", before removing the mask and asking "How about now?". Eventually, with the help of Rapunzel, the fugitives manage to find their way back to their homeland via a magical portal.
- Assorted yokai: Including a bakeneko named Neko, various chōchin'obake, various funayurei, a hitotsume-kozō, various kappa, a kawauso, a kitsune named Tomoko, a kyūso, a noppera-bō, a nue, a nure-onna, various oni, a rokurokubi, Seto taishō, a Sunamura no oryō, two human-sized gashadokuro, various tanuki (only referred to as "raccoons" in the modern world, but by their real name back in the Homelands), various tengu, Tesso, two uwabami, and a wanyūdō.
- Godzilla: Jack Horner has a brief encounter with the legendary monster when one of the tengu drops him into the ocean off the coast of Japan.

=== Others ===
- Count Dracula: The prose story A Wolf in the Fold mentions a Transylvanian count who had befriended Bigby Wolf, before he was taken to Fabletown. The count was rumored to be some fell spirit returned from the dead. In the Fables story The Ascent, Frankenstein's monster ("Frankie") specifically makes references to a vampire count back in Transylvania. Frankie had actually fought the count once, years before he fought the "wolf man" (Bigby) during World War II. Most (if not all) of the killings traditionally credited to vampires and werewolves in the Dracula mythos were Bigby's doing in the Fables series (though Dracula let local peasants believe they were his own doing, to enhance his fearsome reputation), making it hard to judge if vampires and werewolves are Fables and if this Dracula is a real Fable or just the historical Vlad Tepes. During Bigby's adventures during World War II, Nazis revealed that they had knowledge of at least one werewolf, which, according to "Werewolves of the Heartland", was actually Bigby. In "Werewolves Of The Heartlands", it is revealed that there used to be werewolves in the homelands and in the mundane world, and a new breed of werewolves is also created.
- The Grim Reaper has a run-in with Jack Horner in the Fables story Bag 'O Bones, in which Jack finds a way to cheat death.
- Mary Shelley's Dr. Frankenstein is referred to in War Stories, a Fables story set during World War II. A team of German Nazi scientists is using Frankenstein's monster and talks about how they tried to create more of the monster in World War I, but when it didn't work, they realized that the secrets of Doctor Frankenstein's process had died with him. It is unknown whether he was a Fable or one of the unmagic "mundys" of the real world. After defeating the Nazis, Bigby kept the monster's still-living head and returned it to Fabletown. In the March of the Wooden Soldiers story arc, Pinocchio can be seen reading the Frankenstein novel.
- Jill: The Jill from Jack and Jill (not to be confused with Jill the Lilliputian, who helps Jack steal some of Bluebeard's fortune), Jack phones her before going to Hollywood. It is unknown if she lives in Fabletown.
- The Lone Ranger and Tonto: The duo makes an off-screen appearance in the Jack of Fables story arc 1883, which is set in the Old West. A gunsmith sells a special order of silver bullets to the Lone Ranger instead of Jack Horner, believing the Ranger to be part of Jack's gang of robbers. The Ranger is described as a mysterious masked rider with a faithful Native American companion. Jack kills the gunsmith in anger and sets out to find the Lone Ranger in Montana, following his trail. Jack is apprehended by Bigby before he has the chance to catch up with him.
- Elves from The Elves and the Shoemaker are still offering their services to the shoemaker (Crispin, who lives in Fabletown) from time to time, as seen in Cinderella: From Fabletown with Love. They have also been secretly working for Beauty in making the Fable comics sold at Nod's bookstore, while Beauty was working there.
- The Cricket on the Hearth: In "All in a Single Night", the cricket from Charles Dickens' novella takes Rose Red on a journey on Christmas Eve, in a Fables take on A Christmas Carol. "The Cricket on the Hearth" is also the name of one of the issue's chapters. The cricket repeatedly calls Rose "Boz", which was Dickens's family nickname and occasional pen-name.
- Noah the bottle Imp: A small, less powerful version of a genie, who specializes in information, he helps Ali Baba achieve his dream of wealth and love by hooking him up with Lumi, the Snow Queen, after Ali Baba wakes Briar Rose from enchanted sleep and realizes that Briar is not the girl for him.
- Saint George: Appears as a detective in the Fairest story Lamia, tracking down the issue's title character - the Lamia, a.k.a. Beauty - in a story set in 1940s Los Angeles. With the sword Ascalon, he had slain the dragon in his Fable homeland of Silene. With it he also slew the beast Chimæra, the dragon Illuyankas, the dragon Tiamat and the serpent Vritra. It is strongly implied that Beast kills him in order to protect Beauty.
- Dragon from Saint George and the Dragon: Referred to in the Fairest story Lamia.
- The Chimæra: Referred to in the Fairest story Lamia, it was slain by Saint George.
- Illuyankas the dragon: Referred to in the Fairest story Lamia, slain by Saint George.
- Tiamat: A dragon referred to in the Fairest story Lamia, also slain by Saint George.
- The serpent Vritra: Referred to in the Fairest story Lamia, another beast slain by Saint George.
- Lady Maeve: From Irish mythology, she is from the Fable Homeland Dunhollow, and is one of Rose Red's new Knights of the Round Table, as seen in the Camelot story arc.
- Rama and Veruna as seen in the Fairest story Of Men and Mice.

=== The Wolf Among Us ===
Fables first introduced in the prequel video game The Wolf Among Us:

- Faith, a prostitute who was found murdered in the first episode of the game, "Faith". After the Woodsman attacks her, Bigby steps in and saves her. When she is found murdered later, Bigby finds her ring stuffed in her severed head, which bears a symbol that leads to her identity. Her story states that she escaped her father, the king, by using a magic coat made from his prize donkey; she married Prince Laurence before the exodus from the Homelands. Fallen on hard times in Fabletown, Faith estranged from Laurence and turned to prostitution, and Laurence, out of guilt for burdening her, tried to commit suicide (based on the player's action, he has a chance to survive).
- Toad Jr., or "TJ", the son of Mister Toad, who is the landlord of the tenement building the Woodsman lived in. He helps Bigby and Snow find a clue in Faith's donkeyskin coat, which she wore to the Woodsman's apartment and left behind after he and Bigby fought.
- Dee and Dum Tweedle, twin brothers who claim were hired as private detectives by an unknown employer to investigate Faith's death. Dee roughs up Mr. Toad while looking for The Woodsman and something thought to be in his possession; Dee is pursued and caught by Bigby when they meet at Faith's and Laurence's apartment, but Dum saves him. At the Trip Trap Bar, Dee encounters Bigby again, and the player has to choose whether to arrest Dee or the Woodsman.
- Holly, a female troll who owns and runs the Trip Trap Bar, she is friends with the Woodsman, Gren, and Jack Horner. Gren says that her sister is missing. Snow later finds the corpse of a female Fable using a black-market glamour to appear as Snow, and the body is revealed to be Lily, Holly's sister. Holly is informed of her sister's death by Bigby, and what she says next sends Bigby to investigate her pimp Georgie Porgie. In episode 3, Holly is outraged at Bigby when she learned that Lily's corpse was thrown down the Witching Well, even when Snow tells her that was Crane's doing; Holly and Gren are then injured fighting the Tweedles when they interrupt Lily's funeral. At the Trip Trap in episode 3, Holly, rendered confused and lethargic due to the medicine Dr. Swineheart gave her for her injuries, has a conversation with Bigby while he roots through Lily's possessions for a clue to the witch Crane had hired for the black-market glamour.
- Grendel, or Gren, a barfly who regulars the Trip Trap Bar, he first appears waiting in line to see Acting Mayor Ichabod Crane and calls Bigby a "fucker". He later appears at the Trip Trap Bar. When Bigby meets the Woodsman at the Bar, Gren drops his glamour, revealing his true form to resemble a shark-like humanoid, and attacks Bigby; Bigby wins by partially morphing into his wolf form and targeting Gren's right arm, implying it was reattached after Beowulf ripped it off in the old legend. After beating Gren in the fight, the player can choose to rip off his arm or not.
- Georgie Porgie is the pimp who owns the seedy bar/strip-club "Pudding & Pie", and employed Faith. He speaks in a British-Yorkshire accent, and is quite foul-tempered and thuggish, despite a tendency to quickly back down whenever someone challenges him. He often needlessly antagonises or provokes other Fables, even when they clearly outclass him in strength and rank. He is introduced in the second episode "Smoke and Mirrors". He is revealed to be the murderer of Lilly and Faith, acting on behalf of his boss, the Crooked Man. Furious that the Crooked Man attempts to throw him under the bus for the murders, he starts a three-way fight between himself, Bigby, and the Crooked Man's henchmen, during which he is mortally slashed with a knife, before he manages to escape back to his club along with Vivian. When Vivian commits suicide out of guilt, Georgie breaks down in despair and with his dying breaths, he reveals to Bigby where to find the Crooked Man's hideout.
- Clever Hans is the handyman, janitor, and bouncer for the Pudding And Pie. A well-meaning simpleton, Hans accidentally reveals the planner the prostitutes use when Georgie was arguing with Bigby. Georgie threatens Hans with a cricket bat for revealing the book, but Bigby takes the bat and threatens to trash the club with it for the book.
- Nerissa, once known as The Little Mermaid, is a stripper and prostitute working for Georgie Porgie. Unable to break her code of silence ("these lips are sealed"), Nerissa gets Bigby to pay for her services so she can give him a room key for The Open Arms Hotel, where Georgie's girls use to service their johns. Bigby goes to The Open Arms to find the room Lily last used and investigate what he later learns is the site of her murder. Nerissa appears at Lily's funeral in episode 3, and is later attacked by Crane at the Pudding And Pie.
- Auntie Greenleaf is a witch living outside of the Thirteenth Floor of the Woodlands, and the one providing illegal glamours for Ichabod Crane to have sex with Lily in the form of Snow White. When Bigby and Snow find her apartment, she glamours herself into the form of a little girl named Rachel (presumably her deceased daughter) in an attempt to throw the duo off the trail. When they uncover the ruse, Greenleaf refuses to help them find Crane, warning them of "forces beyond their authority". When Snow threatens to burn down her ancient tree, which is both a family heirloom and what she uses to create her back-alley glamours, she tells them that Crane was at her apartment to take from her possession the Ring of Dispel, so he could undo the spell that keeps Georgie's girls from breaking their silence so Crane could prove himself innocent of Lily's and Faith's murders (Greenleaf says that the Ring lost its power decades ago). After they get this info out of Greenleaf, the player can decide whether or not to continue with destroying the tree.
- Vivian is Georgie's lover and second-in-command at the Pudding & Pie. Her origin fable is shrouded in mystery for much of the story, but her true identity as The Girl with the Ribbon is revealed, when Georgie explains that she found a way to duplicate her magic ribbon and transfer its curse to the women she and Georgie employed. Filled with regret over the murders, she decides to break the spell on the women by taking off the ribbon, killing herself in the process.
- Bloody Mary is the Crooked Man's bodyguard and main enforcer. She enjoys intimidating other Fables and causing mayhem, pain, and bloodshed, something which her employment under Crooked Man gives her ample opportunity to do. She has the power to teleport by using reflective surfaces and is capable of duplicating herself. She appears as a woman with short black hair with a red-dyed streak in it, and she claims that she kills mundane children for fun. She and the Tweedles corner Bigby, Snow, and Crane in an alley so they can kidnap Crane. After she gets Dee and Dum to shoot at Bigby until he transforms into a wolf-man, she shoots and disables Bigby with a silver bullet from her revolver so she can chop off his head with an axe (heavily implying that she is the one who killed Faith and Lily, at the Crooked Man's behest); Snow surrenders Crane, so the Crooked Man signals Mary to spare Bigby (she breaks his arm instead). She ends up getting killed in a fight against Bigby.
- Tiny Tim works for the Crooked Man as a house guard and escorts Bigby to him, though it is unclear whether this is his normal job or whether he is given jobs to do by the Crooked Man.
- The Crooked Man is the main antagonist of the game's storyline. Back in the Homelands, he killed his wife and child, not wanting to share his fortune with them. In Fabletown he has become a crime boss who claims to be legitimate businessman who provides help to downtrodden Fables by offering them cheap glamours and employment, but in reality, his organisation is a thinly disguised racketeering ring which muscles in on other businesses and keeps its members in forced servitude through heavy debts, threats and acts of violence, and even torture. The Crooked Man is articulate, cunning, and manipulative, and likes to put on airs of sophistication, but when he loses his temper he reveals a terrifying and unrelenting ruthlessness. At the end of the game's storyline, he is found guilty of murder and either thrown down the Witching Well, turned into a caged raven by Aunty Greenleaf and send to the Farm, or brutally killed by Bigby.
