= Legacy of Robert E. Howard =

Impact of American pulp fiction writer

Robert E. Howard's legacy extended after his death in 1936. Howard's most famous character, Conan the Barbarian, has a pop-culture imprint that has been compared to such icons as Tarzan of the Apes, Count Dracula, Sherlock Holmes, and James Bond. Howard's critical reputation suffered at first but over the decades works of Howard scholarship have been published. The first professionally published example of this was L. Sprague de Camp's Dark Valley Destiny (1983) which was followed by other works, including Don Herron's The Dark Barbarian (1984) and Mark Finn's Blood & Thunder (2006). Also in 2006, a charity, Robert E. Howard Foundation, was created to promote further scholarship.

Following Robert E. Howard's death, the courts granted his estate to his father, who continued to work with Howard's literary agent Otis Adelbert Kline. Dr. Isaac Howard passed the rights on to his friend Dr. Pere Kuykendall, who passed them to his wife, Alla Ray Kuykendall, and daughter, Alla Ray Morris. Morris left the rights to the widow of her cousin, Zora Mae Bryant, who gave control to her children, Jack Baum and Terry Baum Rogers. The Baums eventually sold their rights to the Swedish company Paradox Entertainment, Inc (now Cabinet Entertainment).

Howard's first published novel, A Gent from Bear Creek, was printed in Britain one year after his death. This was followed in the United States by a collection of Howard's stories, Skull-Face and Others (1946) and then the novel Conan the Conqueror (1950). The success of Conan the Conqueror led to a series of Conan books from publisher Gnome Press, the later editor of which was L. Sprague de Camp. The series led to the first Conan pastiche, the novel The Return of Conan by De Camp and Swedish Howard fan Björn Nyberg. De Camp eventually achieved control over the Conan stories and Conan brand in general. Oscar Friend took over from Kline as literary agent and he was followed by his daughter Kittie West. When she closed the agency in 1965, a new agent was required. De Camp was offered the role but he recommended Glenn Lord instead. Lord began as a fan of Howard and had re-discovered many unpublished pieces that would otherwise have been lost, printing them in books such as Always Comes Evening (1957) and his own magazine The Howard Collector (1961–1973). He became responsible for the non-Conan works and later restored, textually-pure versions of the Conan stories themselves.

In 1966, De Camp made a deal with Lancer Books to republish the Conan series, which led to the "First Howard Boom" of the 1970s; many of his works were reprinted (some printed for the first time) and they expanded into other media such as comic books and films. The Conan stories were increasingly edited by De Camp and the series was extended by pastiches until they replaced the original stories. In response, a "purist" movement grew up demanding Howard's original, un-edited stories. The first boom ended in the mid-1980s. In the late 1990s and early 21st century, the "Second Howard Boom" occurred. This saw the printing of new collections of Howard's work, with the restored texts desired by purists. As before, the boom led to new comic books, films and computer games. Howard's house in Cross Plains has been converted into the Robert E. Howard Museum which has been added to the National Register of Historic Places.

== Howard's estate ==
In his will Robert E. Howard left his literary estate to his friend Lindsey Tyson. Dr. Isaac Howard attempted to cover this up but the news made its way to Tyson anyway. However, Tyson was shaken by his friend's suicide and wanted nothing to do with it. After some delays, the Callahan County court eventually granted the estate to Howard's father. Robert's agent, Kline, agreed to perform the same job for Isaac as well as working to collect the money still owed. They sold some of Robert's unsold manuscripts and attempted to arrange publication of collected editions.

The first Robert E. Howard novel was A Gent from Bear Creek, printed by British publisher Herbert Jenkins in 1937. It was based on Howard's Breckenridge Elkins stories, which he had edited together and partially rewritten to form a continuous story. The novel was not successful and very few copies still exist today.

In 1942, Dr. Howard moved to the town Ranger to help in a clinic run by Dr. Pere M. Kuykendall. Dr. Howard died of a heart attack on November 12, 1944. His body was buried with his wife and son in Brownwood. He left all that he owned to Dr. Kuykendall, including Robert Howard's literary rights, with the exception of a trunk of Robert E. Howard's papers, about half of his written output, which were sent to E. Hoffmann Price in California. In 1946, Howard's agent, Otis Adelbert Kline, also died and his agency was bought by Oscar J. Friend.

== New collections ==
Also in 1946, a collection of stories called Skull-Face and Others was released by August Derleth and his publishing company Arkham House. This book was reviewed by Hoffman Reynolds Hays in the New York Times Book Review under the title "Superman on a Psychotic Bender." Hays' review was flawed, bearing little relation to Howards' work, and he was the first critic to make ill-considered claims about Howard's life and sanity. Another book was published in 1950, this time a hardback version of the Conan novel "The Hour of the Dragon" re-titled as Conan the Conqueror. Martin Greenberg, owner of Gnome Press and a fan of Howard from the Weird Tales days, had approached Oscar Friend with a proposal for hardback reprints of all the Conan series. Conan the Conqueror was successful enough for the remaining five books in the series to go into production. The series, however, was not as much of a success and by the late 1950s the books could be found selling for just 50 cents. Conan the Conqueror also displayed another early example of a trend in Howard publishing, in the introduction editor and Howard fan John D. Clark wrote "Don't look for hidden philosophical meanings or intellectual puzzles in these yarns–they aren't there." This claim would later be refuted by Howard scholars.

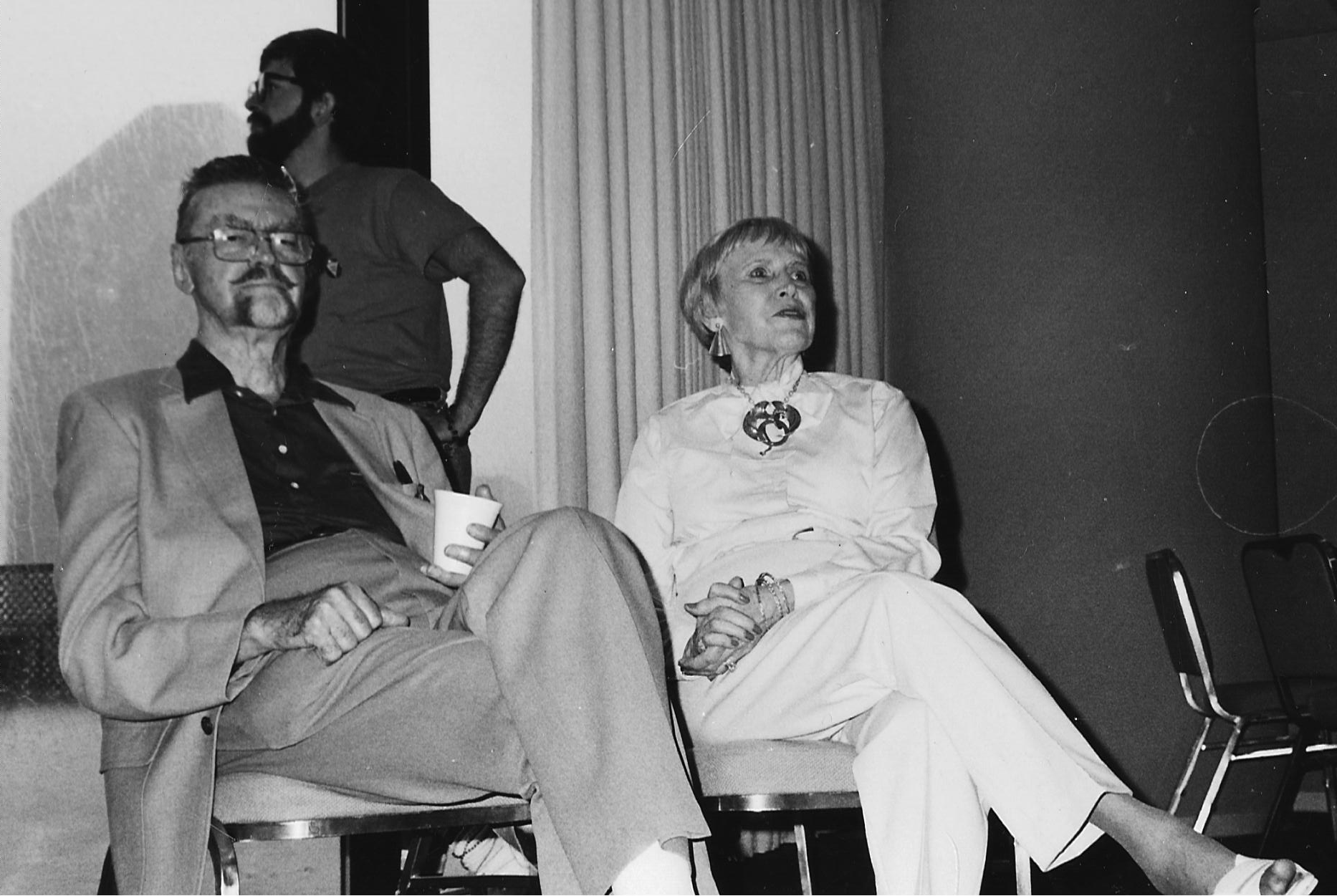
L. Sprague de Camp and Catherine Crook de Camp at Nolacon II in New Orleans (1988)

The editor of the later Gnome Press editions was the prominent science-fiction and fantasy writer L. Sprague de Camp. Friend had written to Dr. Kuykendall in February 1954 stating that the Conan property was too valuable to allow to simply come to an end with the final Gnome Press book. He suggested commissioning new Conan stories from a new writer, to which Kuykendall agreed. After editing some previously unpublished Howard-written Conan stories, de Camp wrote the new stories to be inserted into the now "official" timeline (based on a fan letter to Howard written by John D. Clark and P. Schuyler Miller in 1936). He subsequently converted unpublished non-Conan stories by Howard into Conans, for example the Crusades-era "Hawks over Egypt" was converted into the Conan story "Hawks over Shem." He also converted the pirate story "Swords of the Red Brotherhood" into the Conan story "The Treasure of Tranicos" despite the fact that it had been originally written by Howard as the Conan story "The Black Stranger," re-writing it himself into the pirate version after it failed to sell. These stories were referred to as "posthumous collaborations," about which de Camp later wrote "it was mostly a matter of changing names, eliminating gunpowder, and dragging in a supernatural element." De Camp also edited the first outright non-Howard Conan story (often referred to as "pastiches"), "The Return of Conan" by Swedish Howard fan Björn Nyberg, which was the seventh and last of the Gnome books. When the copyrights on Howard's original Conan stories expired between 1959 and 1963, de Camp filed copyrights on the stories he had edited as well as his new Conan material. De Camp had legal difficulties with Martin Greenberg and Gnome Publishing over unpaid monies, which eventually led to court and winning control over the Conan stories.

By 1957 Floyd C. Gale of Galaxy Science Fiction said that H. P. Lovecraft and Howard "seemingly goes on forever; the two decades since their death are as nothing. In any event, they appear more prolific than ever. What with de Camp, Nyberg and Derleth avidly rooting out every scrap of their writings and expanding them into novels, there may never be an end to their posthumous careers". In the 1950s, a young fan named Glenn Lord began methodically scouring the country for hundreds of lost Howard stories and poems. In particular, he approached E. Hoffmann Price about the trunk of Howard material sent to him by Dr. Isaac Howard. Price had lent material to others, not always keeping track of to whom he had done so, nor of where the works had ended up. Lord traced the papers from one person to the next and was eventually able to recover the material, especially after offering a cash reward. Using material from the trunk, Arkham House printed Lord's book of Howard's poetry Always Comes Evening in 1957, and from 1961 to 1973 Lord published a journal called The Howard Collector.

Dr. Kuykendall and Oscar Friend died in 1959. Alla Ray Kuykendall and her daughter Alla Ray Morris inherited the rights to Howard's works while Friend's daughter, Kittie West, became their agent. In 1965, however, West began to close down the agency. Her first choice as a replacement was de Camp, who refused in order to prevent a possible conflict of interest. He did, however, recommend Glenn Lord for the position, as long as de Camp retained control of Conan. The Kuykendalls agreed and Lord accepted the role in March of that year, which he retained until September 1993.

== The first Howard boom ==
In 1966, de Camp made a deal with struggling Lancer Books to publish the existing Howard and non-Howard Conan corpus in paperback, along with additional material contributed by himself and his colleague and collaborator Lin Carter. Together they completed recently discovered fragments of Conan pieces by Howard and wrote several of their own stories to fill out the picture of Conan's career. The Lancer Conan series became a publishing phenomenon, selling millions. Sporting a set of now-classic covers painted by Frank Frazetta, the success of the Lancers created a decade-long "Howard boom" in the 1970s. De Camp increasingly wrote introductions and short articles about Howard. Despite factual inaccuracies in these, he became seen as the leading expert on Howard and his works.

At the same time Lord arranged for other Howard works to see print. The publisher Donald Grant began by reprinting Howard's first novel, A Gent from Bear Creek. With the success of the Conan stories, Lancer also began to publish other Howard stories, such as a series of Kull books. In 1970, Marvel Comics bought the rights to produce Conan comics, which included Conan the Barbarian and The Savage Sword of Conan. The latter of these was classed as a magazine, including articles as well as comic book sections, which allowed it to include more mature content than was allowed at the time under the Comics Code Authority.

Fan works appeared as well, the most significant of which were Amra and the Robert E. Howard United Press Association (REHupa). Amra was a fanzine than began publication in 1959, created by L. Sprague de Camp and George Scithers, and grew to attract material from many famous authors and artists. Named after one of Conan's alter egos, it covered the subjects of Conan, Robert E. Howard and the sword and sorcery genre in general. It continued publication for thirty-three years. REHupa was formed in 1972 as an amateur press association, each of the small membership producing their own regular fanzine, which is sent to the Official Editor and subsequently disseminated to all members. REHupa still exists to this day.

Lancer filed for bankruptcy in 1973 but managed to continue doing business for another three years. De Camp sued Lancer for unpaid royalties and was himself sued by Lord for the same thing; Kuykendall and Morris were due royalties from foreign language Conan publications arranged by de Camp. De Camp paid the money but the business relationship became strained. To simplify business matters a new company, Conan Properties, Inc., was formed in January 1970 which included both de Camp and Lord on its board of directors. Companies similar to Conan Properties were later created for his other characters, including Solomon Kane Properties, LLC; Kull Productions, LLC; and Red Sonja Corporation.

Soon afterwards, the rights to a Conan film were sold to Dino de Laurentiis which, after several scripts, led to Conan the Barbarian starring Arnold Schwarzenegger. Conan Properties, Inc. also sold the printing rights to a new company, Ace Books, who publishing the existing twelve book Conan set along with additional new Conan novels. However, the original works were later cancelled, leaving only the derivative pastiches in print.

REHupa collected a hardcore group of Howard fans and allowed them to communicate ideas easily. Their discussions led to the beginning of a "purist" movement within Howard fandom demanding texts as they were written by Howard without any subsequent amendments or alterations. This movement began in 1977, led by author Karl Edward Wagner, who worked with Glenn Lord to produce the first pure Howard texts, in the public domain, from Berkeley Books. The publication of the critical essay "Conan vs. Conantics" by Don Herron continued the movement. In this, Herron drew attention to the failings of de Camp and Carter as compared to the original work of Howard, whose work they had repeatedly altered.

== Interim ==
The first Howard boom faded in the mid-1980s in the wake of poor books, movies and Howard-imitators. Following the end of the Howard boom, the rights to Howard's works moved around as their holders died. Alla Ray Morris died in 1995; she left the rights to Zora Mae Bryant who was the widow of Alla Ray's cousin. Bryant gave control of the rights to her children, Jack Baum and Terry Baum Rogers. In 1996, they formed Robert E. Howard Properties, LLC, to control the parts of Howard's literary estate not already controlled by another company. The Baums also sold their shares in Conan Properties, Inc.

Following de Camp's death in November 2000, Conan Properties, Inc. was sold to Stan Lee Media. Shortly after this, Stan Lee Media filed for bankruptcy and in 2002 Conan Properties, Inc. was bought by Paradox Entertainment, Inc. In 2006, the Baums sold Robert E. Howard Properties, LLC and all their rights to Paradox, giving that company control over most (approximately 85%) of Howard's estate.

== The second Howard boom ==
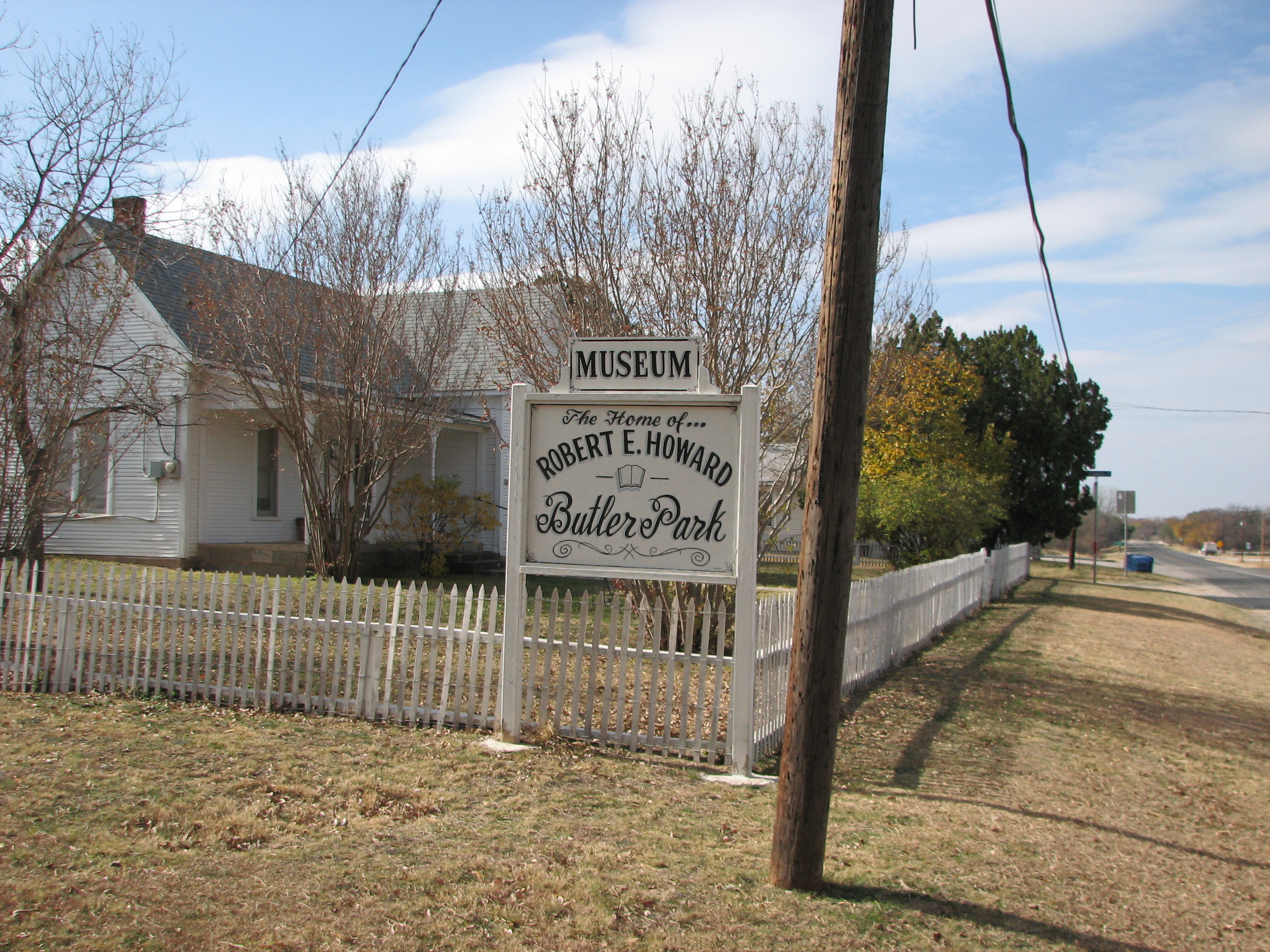
Robert E. Howard Museum, Cross Plains, Texas.

In 1990, Howard's hometown of Cross Plains, Texas, formed Project Pride to promote their community. They bought Howard's old house, then vacant, restored it and converted it into a museum that has been added to the National Register of Historic Places. Cross Plains celebrates Robert E. Howard Days annually on the second weekend in June, called Howard Days. This mini-convention attracts over a hundred fans yearly; events include tours of Howard's home and special postal cancellations, and the Cross Plains Library displays a selection of original Howard manuscripts.

In 2006, a non-profit organization called the Robert E. Howard Foundation was created. The purpose of the organization is to promote Howard scholarship, publishing and Howard-related programs. The Foundation was suggested by Paradox Entertainment, the current holders of the rights to most of the Howard's works, and was created with their co-operation. The board members of the Foundation are Rusty Burke, Paul Herman, Patrice Louinet and, from Paradox, Fred Malmberg and Peter Sederowsky. Glenn Lord served as a semi-official adviser prior to his death, but was not himself a board member. Since creation, the foundation has published several books including collections of Howard's correspondence and a book containing all of his poetry known to still exist.

The theme of the 2006 World Fantasy Convention in Austin, Texas was celebrating the centennial of Howard's birth. Two books published to correspond with the convention were Cross Plains Universe: Texans Celebrate Robert E. Howard, edited by Joe R. Lansdale and Scott A. Cupp, and Blood & Thunder by Mark Finn.

This period is being referred to as the "Second Howard Boom." Howard's original works are back in print with their original texts, in some cases for the first time. New comics are being printed and new movies in production. More critical studies have been produced, in the form of new books, journals and fanzines.

== Critical appreciation ==
In the decades following Howard's death, he often suffered at the hands of genre critics disdainful of Sword-and-Sorcery, such as Damon Knight, but nevertheless his fame has grown exponentially, fueled largely by the character of Conan. Arkham House, a revered fantasy publisher started by Weird Tales regulars August Derleth and Donald Wandrei, started the trend by publishing Skull-Face and Others (1946), one of only four deluxe omnibus volumes in the company's history.

Early appreciation for Howard's work came more from fellow writers than from critics. In his book Literary Swordsmen and Sorcerers, de Camp describes an interview with J. R. R. Tolkien in which he "indicated that he rather liked Howard's Conan stories."

Serious Howard scholarship began with the 1983 publication of de Camp's biography of Robert E. Howard, Dark Valley Destiny. This was based on The Miscast Barbarian, a shorter piece de Camp had published in 1975; he expanded on his earlier effort with the assistance of his wife, Catherine de Camp, and a former teacher named Jane Whittington Griffin. The three conducted interviews among those people who had known Howard, who were still alive and who were willing to talk to them. A current opinion is their material was tainted, however, due to de Camp's preconceived bias that Howard was an intensely troubled man. De Camp focused on information that would support his view of Howard's suicide. The book met with a mixed reception and many fans considered it outright character assassination, while others praise it. The interviews notes themselves are now archived with the rest of de Camp's papers in the Harry Ransom Center at the University of Texas in Austin. Don Herron, in the acknowledgement for his book The Dark Barbarian, wrote that "with his uninspired 'additions' to the Conan canon, and especially for mixing his own stories and those of his inept collaborator Lin Carter in with Howard's own fiction, de Camp's reputation has been in steep decline in Howardian circles as the purist movement has come fully to the forefront. But he researched the biography at a time when many people who had known Howard personally were still alive, and so preserved valuable information that might otherwise have been lost."

More scholarly books followed from other sources. The first was The Dark Barbarian (1984), a collection of essays about Howard's literary works edited by noted critic Don Herron, who earlier had penned the seminal essay, "Conan vs. Conantics". The Dark Barbarian was the first critical volume on Howard to appear by an academic press, and has since been followed by a 2004 sequel titled The Barbaric Triumph. This was followed by Robert E. Howard (1987), number 35 of The Starmont Reader's Guide series, written by Marc A. Cerasini and Charles E. Hoffman, the first book length study of Howard's entire literary output.

Another academic press, Bison Books (University of Nebraska–Lincoln), has recently released five hardcover volumes of Howard's work featuring introductions and textual restoration by Howard scholars.

Fifty years after Howard's death, a now-retired Novalyne Price Ellis, upset by Howard's portrayal in de Camp's Dark Valley Destiny, wrote One Who Walked Alone (1986) to counteract its influence. Ten years later, the book was made into a critically acclaimed film called The Whole Wide World, starring Renée Zellweger and Vincent D'Onofrio.

In recent years Howard's stories have been meticulously restored and republished by presses such as Wandering Star, Del Rey, and The Robert E. Howard Foundation, and a journal called The Cimmerian become the first paying market for Howard criticism, publishing twenty issues in three years, before ceasing publication in 2008.

Furthermore, Howard is considered to big one of the Big Three of (secondary world) Fantasy, along with J. R. R. Tolkien and Mervyn Peake.

== Pop culture ==
Commentators often compare Howard's most famous character, Conan the Cimmerian, to Tarzan of the Apes, Count Dracula, Sherlock Holmes, and James Bond. (Note: Herron (1984, p. 149): "Robert E. Howard of Cross Plains, Texas, created one of the great mythic figures in modern popular culture, the Dark Barbarian... [which] put Howard in the select ranks of the literary legend-makers: Ned Buntline, Alexandre Dumas, père, Mary Shelley, Sir Arthur Conan Doyle, Bram Stoker, Edgar Rice Burroughs, Dashiell Hammett, H. P. Lovecraft, J. R. R. Tolkien, and Ian Fleming.") Howard remains a widely read author, (Note: Clareson (1990, p. 14): "Between 1932 and 1936 Weird Tales also provided Robert E. Howard an outlet where he could create the Hyborian world of Conan the Barbarian, thereby begetting the "Sword-and-Sorcery" motif which not only dominates much of contemporary heroic fantasy but has remained a principal ingredient of science fiction itself.") published by hundreds of presses. (Note: Herman (n.d., entire work): A comprehensive listing of past and present Howard volumes.) Critics have compared his work to other American authors known for dark and macabre themes, such as Nathaniel Hawthorne, (Note: Tompkins (2002, cover flap): essay discusses the influence of The Scarlet Letter on Howard's "The Black Stranger" and touches on many similarities of style, characters, and tone.) Herman Melville, (Note: Knight (2004, p. 129): "In his portrayal of the natural world Robert E. Howard follows in the illustrious footsteps of Nathaniel Hawthorne, Herman Melville, and Mark Twain. He designed a thematically resonant geography over the course of his career, worlds worthy of scarlet letters and white whales and great dark rivers – mythic talismans glittering under a velvet night sky. At his best, Howard transforms nature into a brilliant illuminating dreamscape deserving of a place among the great mise en scenes of classic American literature.") and Jack London. (Note: Blosser (1997, p. 16): "'The Children of the Night' and 'People of the Dark' also display the influence of another author whose robust, adventurous personality forms a striking contrast to the introverted, reclusive personae of Lovecraft and Machen. This progenitor was Jack London." The article goes on to describe how REH "skillfully blended the very elements of primitive action and supernatural horror" in which London also specialized.)

== Footnotes ==
=== Sources ===
- Blosser, Fred (1997), "The Star Rover and 'The People of the Night'", The Dark Man (4): 16–18
- Burke, Rusty, "A Short Biography of Robert E. Howard", The Robert E. Howard United Press Association, archived from the original on 2011-09-29
- Burke, Rusty (December 2006), "The Robert E. Howard Foundation", The Cimmerian, 3 (12): 22–23, ISSN 1548-3398
- Clareson, Thomas D. (1990), Understanding Contemporary American Science Fiction, University of South Carolina Press, ISBN 0-87249-870-0
- De Camp, L. Sprague (1976), Literary Swordsmen and Sorcerers, Arkham House, ISBN 0-87054-076-9
- Finn, Mark (2006), Blood & Thunder, Monkeybrain, Inc., ISBN 1-932265-21-X
- Herron, Don, ed. (2004), The Barbaric Triumph, Wildside Press, ISBN 0-8095-1566-0
  - Grin, Leo. "The Reign of Blood". In Herron (2004), pp. 141–160.
  - Knight, George. "Lands of Dreams and Nightmares". In Herron (2004), pp. 129–140.
- Herron, Don (1984), The Dark Barbarian, Greenwood Press, ISBN 0-313-23281-4
- Herman, Paul (n.d.), HowardWorks
- Nielson, Leon (December 2006), "Legacy", The Cimmerian, 3 (12): 17–21, ISSN 1548-3398
- Tompkins, Steve (2002), The Black Stranger typescript, Wandering Star, pp. cover flap essay
