= Lou Anders =

American journalist

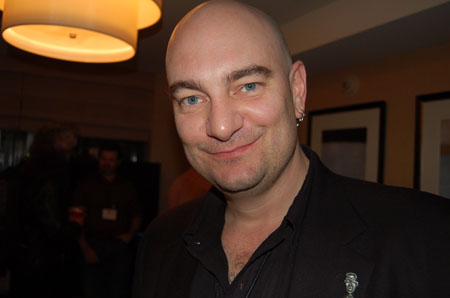
Anders in 2007

Lou Anders is an American author, editor and game designer, best known for the Thrones & Bones series of middle grade fantasy novels. As an editor, he was editorial director and art director of Prometheus Books' science fiction and fantasy imprint Pyr from its launch in 2005 until 2014, and won the 2011 Hugo Award for Best Professional Editor, Long Form and a Chesley Award for art direction. He is also a journalist and tabletop roleplaying game designer; in 2021 he launched Lazy Wolf Studios to publish roleplaying material set in the world of his novels.

== Early life ==
Lou Anders is originally from Birmingham, Alabama, but has lived in multiple cities in several states. In 2003, he returned to Birmingham, Alabama having moved there from Los Angeles via San Francisco.

He describes his route through the science fiction and writings businesses as broadly beginning with "theatre in college lead[ing] to a partial scholarship to study acting in Oxford and London". This in turn got him into directing plays in Chicago, which led to working on sets in Los Angeles, which led to journalism & screenwriting, the former being "sci-fi" based, which led to internet publishing, which led to publishing.

== Career ==
Anders' break came in 1994, when he became involved with the UK's Titan Publishing when they were about to launch the first Star Trek magazine, Star Trek Monthly (launched in March 1995). Recommended to Titan by Jean-Marc Lofficier, Anders became Titan Publishing Group's 'Los Angeles liaison', "churning out about 30 articles a month on average and living on the Star Trek and Babylon 5 sets". Anders was writing scripts and pitches on the side with a writing partner, and in 1996, was asked to write The Making of Star Trek: First Contact for Titan.

Between 1994 and 1999, Anders wrote around 500 articles, which have appeared in multiple magazines on a variety of - primarily science fiction-related - subjects, and Babylon 5 in particular. His articles have appeared in Babylon 5 Magazine, Doctor Who Magazine, Dreamwatch, Manga Max, Sci Fi Universe, Star Trek Monthly and Star Wars Monthly, and been translated into several languages. Much of his work has also appeared online at sites including Believermag.com, the SF Site, Infinity Plus. and RevolutionSF.com, while many of his Star Trek and Babylon 5 articles and interviews "have been illegally transcribed and are scattered throughout [web]sites the world over".

=== Editor ===
==== Bookface ====
In late 1999 or early 2000, Anders moved to San Francisco to become executive editor of Bookface.com, a "read on demand" website that offered books and short stories free to read online, with authors and publishers paid for each page read from advertising revenue. The site launched in June 2000 and stopped trading in early 2001.

In January 2001, Anders edited an anthology entitled Outside the Box: The Best Short Fiction from Bookface.com, which was published by Wildside Press.

==== Argosy ====
In 2003, Anders launched Argosy Magazine in collaboration with publisher James A. Owen, serving from 2003 to 2004 as senior editor on the bimonthly title. It was named after Argosy (a title that dates back to the 19th century), because (as Anders describes in an interview with John C. Snider): "[W]e thought taking a name that harkened back to its spirit was a good launching point from which to found a new magazine, one that sought to set trends for the 21st century, the way Munsey's magazines did for the 19th and 20th. Despite this, Argosy Magazine, however was stated to have "no connection to the original Frank A. Munsey magazine, or any other incarnation of Argosy ... [it] is a completely new magazine ... a new entity."

The new magazine, "devoted to publishing quality fiction in a wide range of genres and styles, from science fiction and fantasy to mystery to mainstream", and including a smattering of non-fiction essays and interviews, launched in November, 2003, and featured in its first eclectic issue an interview by Adam Roberts with Samuel R. Delany. Argosy format complimented its eclectic nature, accompanying its digest-sized magazine with a "separate trade-paperback novella ... [both] presented in an attractive slipcase".(See left for Argosy #2's cover & slipcase.) The uniqueness of its design proved confusing to retailers, however, leading to subsequent issues being published in two formats: "Connoisseur" (two-volume, available through Argosy, to subscribers and via certain comic shops and independent bookshops) and "Proletarian" (single magazine, available at newsstands).

Having overseen the first two issues (and preparatory work on a third), mounting "creative differences" and concerns caused Anders to resign as editor in early July, 2004 to focus on his work with Pyr while Argosy itself went on hiatus.

==== Anthologies ====
Anders has edited a number of anthologies from several different publishers, helped in no small part by having been able to forge links and contacts with sci-fi authors during his time at Bookface. Anders' anthologies include Outside the Box(above) (a 'Print on Demand' collection of short stories that first appeared on Bookface.com) from Wildside Press, Live Without a Net from Roc (although originally planned for a small press, which was going under at the time) and Projections from MonkeyBrain (initially two separate books, "one on literature and one on cinema", co-published by Chris Roberson, whom Anders had met through Live Without a Net).

Anders is seen as a particular mentor to Roberson, whom he met at the World Fantasy Convention in Montreal, where he invited Roberson to submit to Live Without a Net. Roberson's work subsequently appeared in Argosy magazine, Anders' FutureShocks and his novels Here, There & Everywhere and Paragaea: A Planetary Romance have both been published by Pyr. Roberson was also featured in the Anders-edited anthology Sideways in Crime (2008).

Anders notes that his anthology Live Without a Net was a direct reaction against a certain type of science fiction. He says, in interview with Rick Kleffel:

I was reacting to what I felt was a preponderance of post-cyberpunk in American science fiction in the year 2000. The anthology was a deliberate attempt to counter that trend in some small and useful way.

==== Pyr ====
Anders became editorial director of Pyr when it launched in March 2005, after Prometheus Books advertised for someone to start a science fiction line. Authors published by Pyr under Anders included Michael Moorcock, Alan Dean Foster, Adam Roberts, Mike Resnick, Justina Robson, Joe Abercrombie and Ian McDonald. In September 2014, Prometheus Books announced that Anders, who had been editorial and art director of Pyr since its inception ten years earlier, was leaving to write full-time, with Rene Sears as interim editor.

Pyr's published authors also include Michael Moorcock, Alan Dean Foster, Adam Roberts, Mike Resnick, Justina Robson, Joe Abercrombie, and Ian McDonald.

=== Children's author ===
Anders left Pyr in September 2014 to concentrate on writing full-time. That year, Anders published the middle grade novel Frostborn. It was followed by Nightborn, Skyborn, Star Wars: Pirate's Price, and Once Upon a Unicorn. He has short fiction included in the anthologies Star Wars: The Clone Wars: Stories of LIght and Dark and All is Found: A Frozen Anthology.

=== Game designer ===
In the roleplaying game arena, Anders has designed games for Kobold Press, River Horse, and others, contributing to such titles as The Curious Case of the Malfunctioning P.R.A.N.C.E.R., Margreve Player’s Guide, Midgard Magic Ley Lines, Tome of Time, Warlock Grimoire III, Warlock Grimoire IV, and The White Worg Accord.

In 2021, Anders created Lazy Wolf Studios to publish the Thrones & Bones line of campaign settings, adventure books, supplemental materials, and short fiction. To date, Lazy Wolf Studios has released the Norrøngard Campaign Setting, Sagas of Norrøngard, Player's Guide to Norrøngard, Vengeance of the Valravn, Tales from Stolki's Hall, Banner of the Bull, and Keeper of the Drowned.

=== Awards and nominations ===
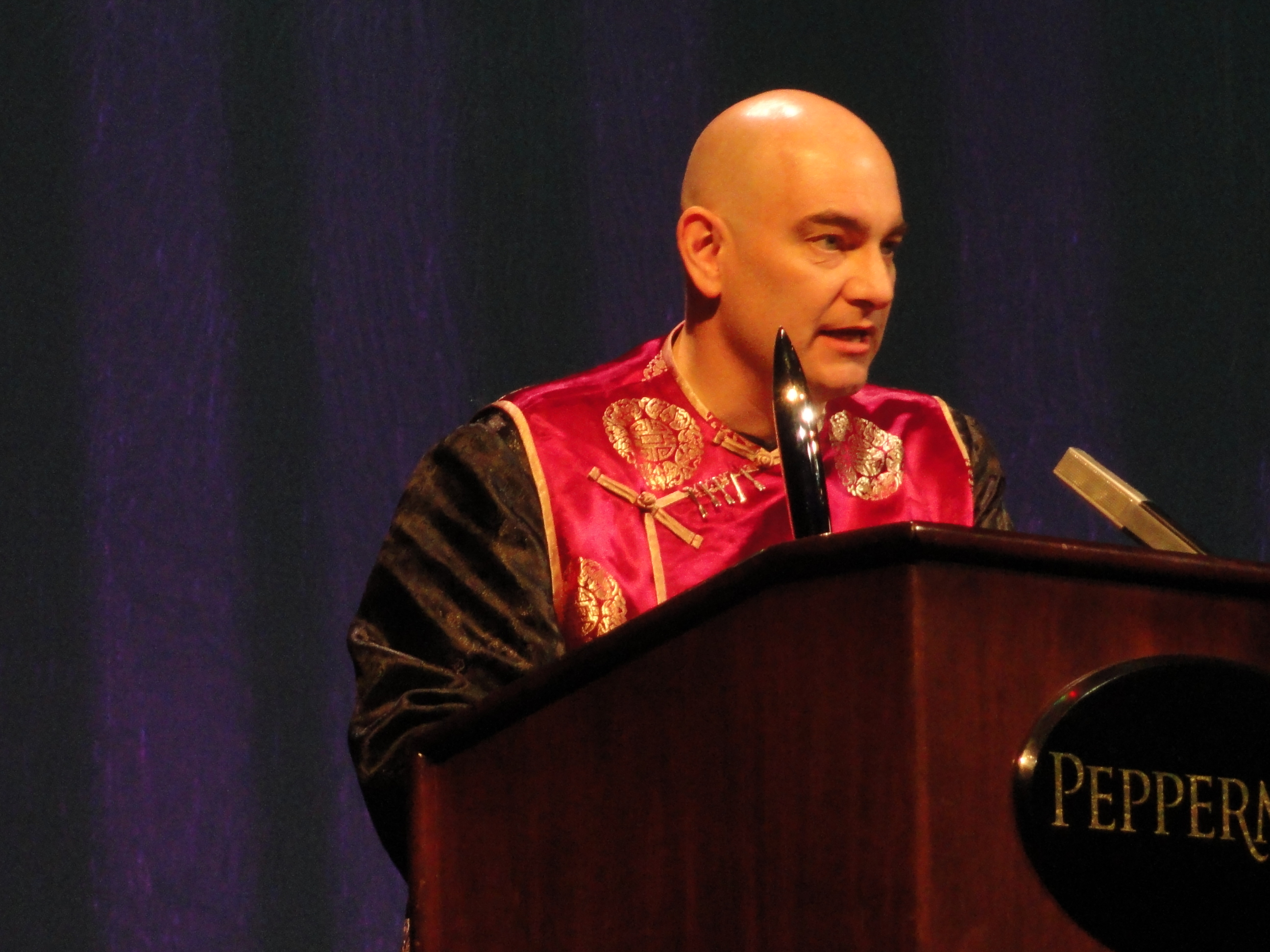
Accepting the Hugo Award - Reno, Nevada, August 2011

Anders was nominated for a Hugo Award for Best Editor Long Form seven years in a row, in 2007, 2008, 2009, 2010, 2011, 2012, and 2013 winning in 2011. He is a 2008 Philip K. Dick Award nominee for his anthology, Fast Forward 2, and a 2010 Locus Award, World Fantasy Award and Shirley Jackson Award nominee for his anthology, Swords & Dark Magic, edited with Jonathan Strahan. He was nominated for a Chesley Award for Best Art Director in 2007, 2009, 2010, 2011, 2012, 2103, and 2014, winning in 2009. He is a 2006 and a 2011 World Fantasy Special Award: Professional nominee for editing at Pyr.

His middle grade fantasy novel Frostborn has been nominated for a 2015-16 Utah Beehive Book Award, a 2016-17 Nebraska Golden Sower Award, a 2016-17 Indiana Young Hoosier Book Award, and a 2016-17 Pennsylvania Young Reader's Choice Award. He was chosen as the 2016 Thurber House Children's Writer-in-Residence.

== Other appearances ==
Anders also features as a recurring fictional cartoon character in Jim Woodward's real-life comic book stories These Things Happen.

== Bibliography ==
=== Novels ===
- Frostborn (Thrones and Bones Book One) (Crown Books for Young Readers August 5, 2014) Cover by Justin Gerard ISBN 978-0385387781
- Nightborn (Thrones and Bones Book Two) (Crown Books for Young Readers July 14, 2015) Cover by Justin Gerard ISBN 978-0385390361
- Skyborn (Thrones and Bones Book Three) (Crown Books for Young Readers September 6, 2016) Cover by Justin Gerard ISBN 978-0385390408
- Once Upon a Unicorn (Thrones and Bones Book Four) (Crown Books for Young Readers August 25, 2020) Cover by Brian Miller ISBN 978-1524719449

=== Anthologies ===
- Outside the Box: The Best Short Fiction from Bookface.com (ed.) (Wildside Press (2001)) Cover by John Picacio ISBN 1-58715-283-5
  - Contributors include: Fiona Avery • Paul Cornell • John Grant • Graham Joyce • Paul Melko • Vera Nazarian • Kate Orman • J. Michael Straczynski
- Live Without a Net (ed.) (Roc Books (Jul, 2004)) Cover by John Picacio (US Trade) ISBN 0-451-45925-3 US MM Paperback ISBN 0-451-45945-8
  - Contributors include: Stephen Baxter • David Brin • Paul Di Filippo • Pat Cadigan • John Grant • Alex Irvine • John Meaney • Paul Melko • Mike Resnick • Chris Roberson • Adam Roberts • Rudy Rucker • S. M. Stirling • Charles Stross • Matthew Sturges • Michael Swanwick
- Projections: Science Fiction in Literature & Film (ed.) (MonkeyBrain (Dec, 2004)) Cover by John Picacio ISBN 1-932265-12-0
  - Contributors include: Catherine Asaro • David Brin • John Clute • Paul Cornell • Mark Finn • James Gunn • John Grant • Howard V. Hendrix • Jonathan Lethem • Robert A. Metzger • Sean McMullen • Michael Moorcock • Adam Roberts • Mike Resnick • Robert J. Sawyer • Lucius Shepard • Robert Silverberg • Michael Swanwick
- FutureShocks (ed.) (Roc Books (Jan, 2006)) Cover by John Picacio ISBN 0-451-46065-0
  - Contributors include: Paul Di Filippo • Kevin J. Anderson • Robert Charles Wilson • John Meaney • Alan Dean Foster • Robert J. Sawyer • Louise Marley • Mike Resnick • Harry Turtledove • Alex Irvine • Caitlín R. Kiernan • Chris Roberson • Adam Roberts
- Fast Forward 1 (ed.) (Pyr (Feb, 2007)) Cover by John Picacio ISBN 1-59102-486-2
  - Contributors include: Robert Charles Wilson • Justina Robson • Robyn Hitchcock • Tony Ballantyne • Elizabeth Bear • Stephen Baxter • Larry Niven • Ken MacLeod • Mike Resnick • Nancy Kress • Ian McDonald • Gene Wolfe • John Meaney • Paul Di Filippo • Paolo Bacigalupi • Kage Baker • A. M. Dellamonica • Louise Marley • Pamela Sargent • Mary A. Turzillo • George Zebrowski
- Sideways in Crime (ed.) (Solaris (June 2008)) Cover by Bob Eggleton ISBN 1-84416-566-3
  - Contributors include: Kage Baker • John Meaney • Stephen Baxter • Paul Park • Jack McDevitt • Kristine Kathryn Rusch • Mary Rosenblum • Paul Di Filippo • Jon Courtenay Grimwood • Theodore Judson • Pat Cadigan • S. M. Stirling • Mike Resnick & Eric Flint • Tobias S. Buckell • Chris Roberson
- Fast Forward 2 (ed.) (Pyr (October 2008)) Cover by John Picacio ISBN 1-59102-692-X
  - Contributors include: Paul Cornell • Kay Kenyon • Chris Nakashima-Brown • Nancy Kress • Jack Skillingstead • Cory Doctorow and Benjamin Rosenbaum • Jack McDevitt • Paul McAuley • Mike Resnick and Pat Cadigan • Ian McDonald • Kristine Kathryn Rusch • Karl Schroeder and Tobias S. Buckell • Jeff Carlson • Paolo Bacigalupi
- Swords & Dark Magic: The New Sword and Sorcery (ed., with Jonathan Strahan) (Eos (June 2010)) Cover by Benjamin Carre ISBN 0-06-172381-9
  - Contributors include: Steven Erikson • Glen Cook • Gene Wolfe • James Enge • C. J. Cherryh • K. J. Parker • Garth Nix • Michael Moorcock • Tim Lebbon • Robert Silverberg • Greg Keyes • Michael Shea • Scott Lynch • Tanith Lee • Caitlin R Kiernan • Bill Willingham • Joe Abercrombie
- Masked (ed.) (Gallery Books (July 2010)) Cover by Trevor Hairsine ISBN 1-4391-6882-2
  - Contributors include: Matthew Sturges • James Maxey • Paul Cornell • Mike Carey • Mike Baron • Daryl Gregory • Gail Simone • Stephen Baxter • Chris Roberson • Peter David and Kathleen David • Joseph Mallozzi • Mark Chadbourn • Marjorie M. Liu • Ian McDonald • Bill Willingham
- Tales From Stolki's Hall (ed.) (Lazy Wolf Studios (September 2023)) Cover by William O'Brian ISBN 979-8985153125
  - Contributors include: Joel Shepherd • Ed Greenwood • K. V. Johansen • Sarah L. Miles • Jon Sprunk • Clay Griffith and Susan Griffith • Rachael Smith • J. Dianne Dotson • Jonathan Anders • Chris Willrich

=== Short fiction ===
- "Crowd Control" in Strange Pleasures 2 by John Grant and Dave Hutchinson (ed.s) (Prime Books (June 2003)) ISBN 1-894815-08-4
- "The Woman on the Cross" in Strange Pleasures 3 by Dave Hutchinson (ed.) (Prime Books (Oct, 2005)) ISBN 0-8095-1160-6
- "The Mad Lands, Part 1: Death Wish" in Adventure, Vol. I by Chris Roberson (ed.) (MonkeyBrain (Nov, 2005)) ISBN 1-932265-13-9
- "Generation Gap" in the Doctor Who anthology Short Trips: Transmissions (2008)
- "And How His Audit Stands" in The Clockwork Jungle Book (Shimmer Magazine Issue #11) (2009)
- "Dooku Captured" in Star Wars: The Clone Wars: Stories of Light and Dark by Jen Heddle (ed.) (Disney Lucasfilm Press (August 2020) ISBN 978-1368057295
- "A Midsummer's Song and Dance" in All is Found: A Frozen Anthology by Heather Knowles and Mari Mancusi (ed.) (Disney Press (November 2023) ISBN 1368057292

=== Selected non-fiction ===
- The Making of Star Trek: First Contact (Titan Books, 1996) ISBN 1-85286-779-5
- The Greenwood Encyclopedia of Science Fiction and Fantasy : Themes, Works, and Wonders (3 vols.) by Gary Westfahl (ed.) (Greenwood Press (Sep, 2005)) ISBN 0-313-32950-8
  - Contributions include: "Babylon 5 (1993-1998) and films", "Batman (1989) &c.", "Doctor Who (1963-1989) and films", "Drugs", "Individualism and Conformity" and "Religion"
- "A Tale of Two Orphans" in The Man from Krypton: A Closer Look at Superman by Glenn Yeffeth (ed.) (BenBella Books (May, 2006)) ISBN 1-932100-77-6
- "A Word Of Warning For Brandon Routh" in The Man from Krypton: A Closer Look at Superman by Glenn Yeffeth (ed.) (BenBella Books (May 2006)) ISBN 1-932100-77-6
- Counsel for the Prosection: "Star Wars novels are poor substitutes for real science fiction and are driving real SF off the shelves" in Star Wars on Trial by David Brin & Matthew Woodring Stover (ed.s) (BenBella Books (June, 2006)) ISBN 1-932100-89-X
- "The Natural and the Unnatural: Verisimilitude in Battlestar Galactica" in So Say We All: Collected Thoughts and Opinions on Battlestar Galactica by Richard Hatch (ed.) (BenBella Books (Oct, 2006)) ISBN 1-932100-94-6
- "The Tangled Web We Weave" in Webslinger: SF and Comic Writers on Your Friendly Neighborhood Spider-Man by Glenn Yeffeth (ed.) (BenBella Books (Mar, 2007)) ISBN 1-933771-06-2
- "New Directions: Mind the Gap": an online essay on the different branches of Science fiction at RevolutionSF
- Star Wars: Pirate's Price ISBN 9781368043823

== I'm External links ==
- Lou Anders' homepage
- Lou Anders' blog "Bowing to the Future"
- Lou Anders' Amazon blog
- Prometheus Books' science fiction/fantasy imprint Pyr Books's website
- David Alastair Hayden interviews Lou Anders for Redstone Science Fiction
- John Snider interviews Lou Anders about Argosy Magazine
- Archived submission information for Argosy at Locus
- "New Directions: Mind the Gap" essay by Lou Anders at RevolutionSF
- Interview on the SciFiDimensions Podcast
- Lou Anders at the Internet Speculative Fiction Database
- Lou Anders at Penguin Random House
- Lazy Wolf Studios Homepage
