= John Picacio =

American artist (born 1969)

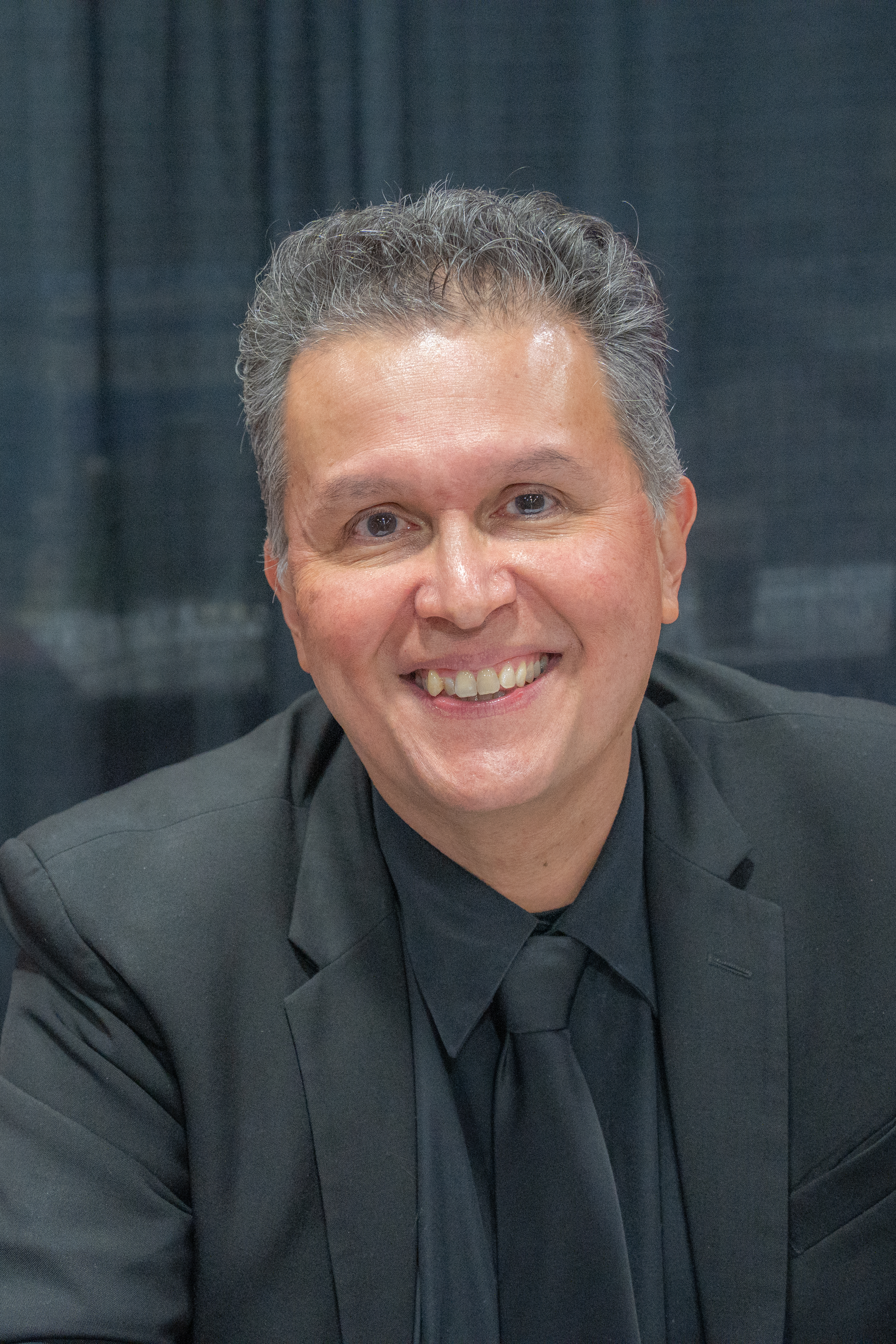
- Picacio at National Book Festival 2025
- Born: September 3, 1969 (age 56); San Antonio, Texas
- Website: johnpicacio.com

John Picacio (born September 3, 1969) is an American artist specializing in science fiction, fantasy and horror illustration.

== Biography ==
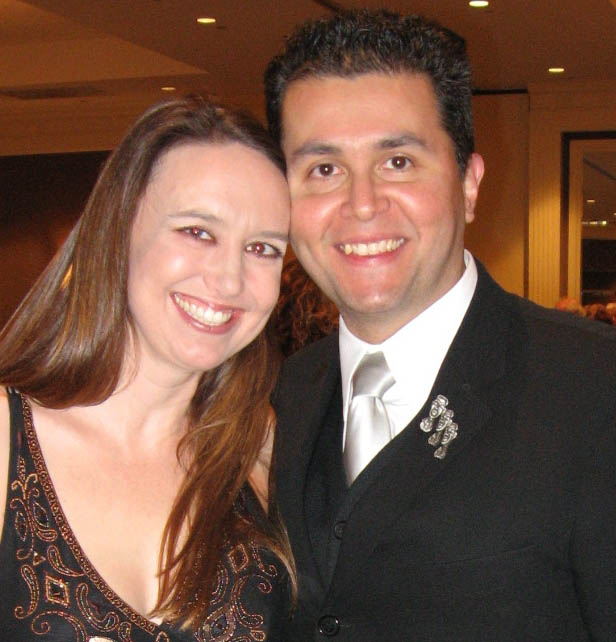
John Picacio with copyeditor Deanna Hoak at the 2007 World Fantasy Convention

Picacio was born on September 3, 1969, in San Antonio, Texas. As of 2007, he still lives and works in San Antonio, together with his wife and daughter. He earned a Bachelor of Architecture degree from the University of Texas at Austin in 1992, and illustrated his first book – Behold the Man: The Thirtieth Anniversary Edition by Michael Moorcock (Mojo Press) – in 1996. In May, 2001 he ended his career in architecture to become a full-time illustrator.

=== Work ===
Cover by John Picacio

He advocates his own method of gaining attention – sending physical samples to art directors of books and magazines – since:

"Even if an artist has a good website, it's a good idea to send out a physical reminder of their art so that art directors can keep it around."

His early work featured in many annuals and art compendiums, including Spectrum: The Best in Contemporary Fantastic Art, as well as magazines such as Realms of Fantasy.

Picacio has since produced design work and – particularly – cover art for many notable SF, fantasy and horror books printed by many different publishers, from some of the longest-established and largest American SF&F imprints (Random House/Ballantine Books/Del Rey; HarperCollins/Eos; Roc Books; Tor Books), to more recent, independent publishers (Golden Gryphon Press; MonkeyBrain Books; Night Shade Books; Tachyon Publications; Earthling Publication and iBooks).

Picacio cites a "mutual respect" between himself and his art directors, who tend to give him "space to create" his artwork, which he sees as part of an interaction with the reader, "communicating with a smart and sophisticated audience". He works particularly well with fellow-Texan Roberson (author and MonkeyBrain publisher), and the editorial director of Prometheus Books' science fiction imprint Pyr Lou Anders. He has provided covers for several of Roberson's solo efforts – from one of his earliest self-published titles, the 2002 Clockwork Storybook title Any Time at All to his 2007 X-Men novel – as well as providing dozens of covers for almost the entire output of MonkeyBrain Books. For Anders, Picacio has provided covers for several anthologies from multiple companies since Wildside Press's 2001 Outside the Box.

=== Awards and nominations ===
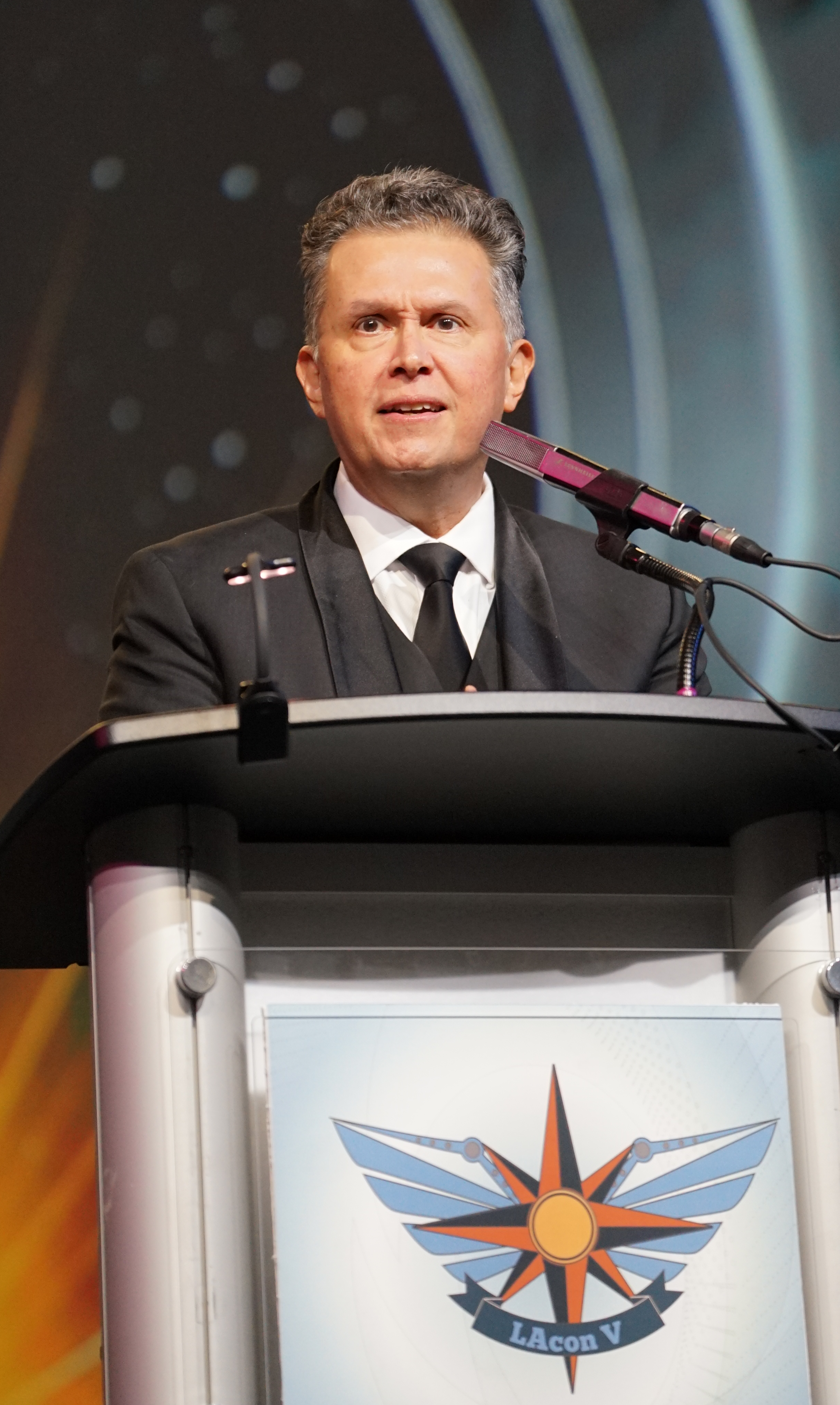
Picacio receiving 2026 Best Professional Artist Hugo Award

Picacio's illustrations have been selected numerous times for Cathy and Arnie Fenner's prestigious Spectrum Annual, the yearly "Best in Contemporary Fantastic Art" showcase for fantasy and science fiction art, which both honours established artists and provides a resource for art directors and illustrators to refer to. In 2001 and 2006, he was awarded the International Horror Guild Award for Best Artist, and was Artist Guest of Honor at the 2003 ArmadilloCon.

In 2005, he won both the World Fantasy Award for Best Artist and the Chesley Award for Best Paperback Cover (for James Tiptree Jr.'s Her Smoke Rose Up Forever). In 2006 he won the Chesley Award for Artistic Achievement and in 2007 the Locus Award for Best Artist. He has also received Hugo Award nominations for Best Professional Artist in 2005 though 2010, and won in 2012. He has received 5 World Fantasy Award nominations since 2002.

He has further won the Locus Award in 2015, 2020, 2021, 2024 and 2026.

His work has also appeared on innumerous award-winning and nominated titles, including Jess Nevins's Encyclopedia of Fantastic Victoriana and the Chris Roberson-edited anthology Adventure Vol. 1, both from MonkeyBrain.

In February 2008, Picacio's was seen fully illustrating (and covering) Michael Moorcock's Elric The Stealer of Souls, as the first in a new series of trade paperback editions of Moorcock's Elric novels published by Ballantine/Del Rey. Picacio's work in the first volume will be followed (in Elric To Rescue Tanelorn) by that of illustrator M. W. Kaluta.

In 2014, Picacio was awarded the Inkpot Award.

He was awarded a 2019 Kate Wilhelm Solstice Award by the SFWA, the citation saying “The work that John Picacio has done with the Mexicanx Initiative started as an effort for one conference and has had ripple effects through the field of science-fiction and fantasy. His on-going outreach is encouraging new voices to enter the community making SFF more vibrant than ever.”

In 2026, Picacio was awarded the Hugo Award for Best Professional Artist.

== Bibliography ==
=== Notable covers ===
- Dangerous Visions: 35th Anniversary Edition, by Harlan Ellison (ed.) (iBooks, 2002)
- The Fantasy Writer's Assistant by Jeffrey Ford (Golden Gryphon, 2002) (Wraparound cover & preliminary sketch)
- Live Without a Net by Lou Anders (ed.) (Roc, 2004)
- Gateway by Frederik Pohl (Ballantine/Del Rey, 2004)
- Wizardry & Wild Romance by Michael Moorcock (MonkeyBrain Books, 2004)
- The Mammoth Book of New Terror by Stephen Jones (ed.) (Robinson/Carroll & Graf, 2004)
- Her Smoke Rose up Forever by James Tiptree, Jr. (Tachyon, 2004)
- Star of Gypsies by Robert Silverberg (Pyr, 2005)
- Bumper Crop by Joe R. Lansdale (Golden Gryphon, 2005)
- Ghosts of Columbia by L. E. Modesitt, Jr. (Tor Books, 2005)
- The Cat’s Pajamas & Other Stories by James Morrow (Tachyon, 2005)
- Adventure, Vol. 1, by Chris Roberson (ed.) (MonkeyBrain Books, 2005)
- Red Planet by Robert A. Heinlein (Ballantine/Del Rey, 2006)
- Macrolife by George Zebrowski (Pyr, 2006)
- The Empire of Ice Cream by Jeffrey Ford (Golden Gryphon, 2006)
- A Canticle for Leibowitz by Walter M. Miller, Jr. (HarperCollins/Eos, 2006)
- H.P. Lovecraft's Book of the Supernatural by Stephen Jones (ed.) (Pegasus Books, 2006)
- Fast Forward 1, by Lou Anders (ed.) (Pyr, 2007)
- X-Men: The Return by Chris Roberson (Pocket Books, 2007)
- The Metatemporal Detective by Michael Moorcock (Pyr, 2007)
- Elric: The Stealer of Souls by Michael Moorcock (Ballantine/Del Rey, 2008)

=== Art collections ===
- Cover Story: The Art of John Picacio (Introduction by Michael Moorcock) (MonkeyBrain Books, 2006)
