= Clockwork Storybook =

Independent book publisher

Clockwork Storybook (CWSB) was a writer's collective and independent book publisher based in Austin, Texas. It specialized in the fantasy, horror and adventure genres.

== History ==
Clockwork Storybook logo, from the now-defunct web-anthology of the same name. Logo by Harold Covey.

Clockwork Storybook was formed in the late 1990s by fellow Austin-based writers Mark Finn, Chris Roberson, Lilah Sturges, and Bill Willingham, beginning as a writing group which met weekly to critique its members' short stories and novels. Soon thereafter, the four began producing monthly content for an online shared world anthology of urban fantasy, revolving around the fictitious city of San Cibola, California, where magical inhabitants co-existed with normal citizens, at www.ClockworkStorybook.com. The website is no longer there, and is only partially accessible through the Internet Archive Project, although content from it surfaces occasionally on the respective authors' websites.

Each issue featured a short story by each of the four founders, plus "an occasional story by guest authors invited to play in our fabricated realm", an editorial and intermittent reviews of various notable books, etc. (The second issue, for example, included contributions from artists Brian Hagen and Jeff Dee) In 1999, they were joined by their first 'Associate Member' - Harold Covey, described as an "artist/designer/renaissance man extraordinaire", who designed the ClockworkStorybook logo. (Above, left)

After a couple of years, the development and increasing popularity of print on demand technologies suggested to them that they could create their own imprint (also called Clockwork Storybook) through which they would publish their own novels and short story collections. They launched with four print titles in spring 2001.

Ultimately, after continuing with the online anthology for a couple of years, and publishing a handful of books, the Clockwork Storybook collective fell apart, and the individual authors went their separate ways.

== Publications ==
Several books/anthologies were printed by Clockwork Storybook, and mostly available through the website. Some reprinted online content, many featured new stories. A partial bibliography includes:

- Clockwork Storybook Offline, Volume I: Mythology by Finn, Roberson, Sturges & Willingham
- Clockwork Storybook Offline, Volume II: The Goblin Market by Finn, Roberson, Sturges & Willingham
- Voices of Thunder by Chris Roberson (February 2001)
- Beneath the Skin & Other Stories by Matthew Sturges (March 2001)
- Gods New & Used by Mark Finn (March 2001)
- Down the Mysterly River by Bill Willingham (April 2001)
- Road Trip by Mark Finn
- The Clockwork Reader Volume 1 (Nov 2001) by Clockwork Storybook
- Set the Seas on Fire by Chris Roberson (December 2001) (reprinted by Solaris, 2007)
- Cybermancy Incorporated by Chris Roberson (December 2001) (cover by Michael Lark)
- Year of the Hare by Mark Finn (December 2001)
- Midwinter by Matthew Sturges (February 2002)
- Hyde and Seek by Bill Willingham (May 2002)
- The Monster Maker by Bill Willingham (May 2002)
- Any Time at All: The Lives and Time of Roxanne Bonaventure by Chris Roberson (September 2002) (cover by John Picacio)

== After Clockwork Storybook ==
Bill Willingham is known for his Vertigo Comics series Fables. Lilah Sturges is probably best known as the co-writer (with Willingham) of Fables spin-off Jack of Fables. Mark Finn is a noted Robert E. Howard scholar and playwright. Chris Roberson is author of several books, and publisher of MonkeyBrain Books.
