= Comics Arts Conference =

Academic conference

The Comics Arts Conference (CAC), also known as the Comic Arts Conference, is an academic conference held in conjunction with both the annual San Diego Comic-Con in San Diego, and WonderCon in San Francisco. Founded in 1992 by Henderson State University communications professor Randy Duncan and Michigan State University graduate student Peter Coogan (author of the book Superhero: The Secret Origin of a Genre), the Comic(s) Arts Conference brings together scholars, professionals, critics, industry professionals, and historians who study comics seriously as a medium.

== History ==
The Comic(s) Arts Conference first convened on August 12, 1992, at the Marriott Hotel and Marina in San Diego as part of that year's Comic-Con International. CAC's inaugural programming featured presentations on Tijuana bibles, The Role of the Indian in the Western Comic Book, and Coogan's opinion of The Present State of Comics Scholarship. Highlights included Duncan's lecture on Applying Rhetorical Methodologies to the Study of Comics with highly acclaimed comics professional Will Eisner and noted comics scholar Scott McCloud as respondents. Comics creator Leonard Rifas presented a talk on Fredric Wertham, to which Stephen R. Bissette and R. C. Harvey responded.

Over time, CAC has evolved and expanded, introducing seminars, poster sessions, and roundtable discussions on topics ranging from the superhero genre as a whole to specific stories or characters. CAC's location originally alternated between San Diego Comic-Con (1992, 1993, and 1996) and the Chicago Comicon (later known as Wizard World Chicago Comic Con before becoming Fan Expo Chicago) in 1994 and 1995 before a 1997 hiatus, then becoming permanently attached to San Diego Comic-Con as an official part of the international convention in 1998. The Comics Arts Conference expanded in 2007 when it began to meet twice annually, adding sessions at February's WonderCon in San Francisco in addition to July's Comic-Con. The WonderCon conference was repeated in February, 2008, and was intended as a move toward permanently running the conference semi-annually, moving with WonderCon from San Francisco to Anaheim.

== Presentations ==
To addition to invited speakers, the conference accepts submissions from anyone in the form of on a wide variety of topics. CAC organizers seek proposals from a broad range of disciplinary and theoretical perspectives, welcoming the participation of academic, independent, and fan scholars. They welcome professionals from all areas of the comics industry, including creators, editors, publishers, retailers, distributors, and journalists. Presentations include academic papers as well as less formal panels, poster sessions, and slide talks. CAC encourages professional debate by inviting scholars and professionals to participate as respondents to presentations. Papers and respondents come from a range of backgrounds, perspectives, and disciplines taking either a critical or historical perspective on any aspects of comics. Even university students, both undergraduates and graduate students supervised by their professors, have collected data on Comic-Con and WonderCon fan behaviors in order to present their findings at CAC and presented their efforts in comics creation.

== Past participants ==
The open conference includes academically minded historians and chroniclers as well as noted writers, artists and other professionals from within the comics industry. The first conference, in 1992, featured contributions from Will Eisner and a presentation by noted professional Steve Bissette entitled Journey into Fear: The History and Heritage of the Horror Comic. It also saw a preview by Scott McCloud of his then-up-coming masterwork Understanding Comics.

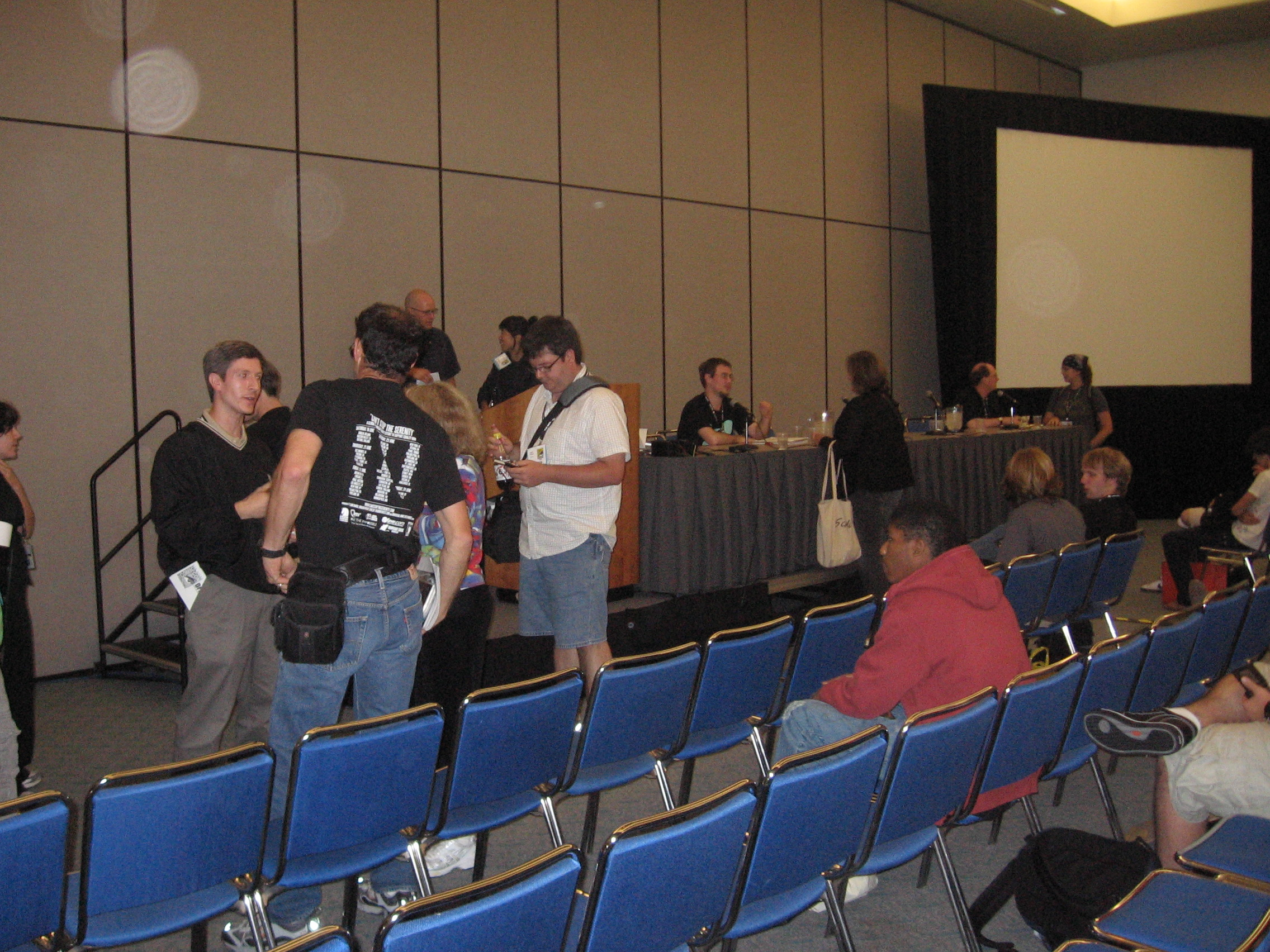
Scholars talk after a Comics Arts Conference panel session. July 2007.

Eisner and McCloud became semi-regular attendees in subsequent years, including 2002 when they joined Robert C. Harvey for the tenth-anniversary Comic Arts Conference in a wide-ranging discussion entitled Eisner, Harvey, and McCloud Ten Years Later: The Dialogue Continues. Over the years, other noted industry professionals who have taken part include Jessica Abel, Scott Allie, Donna Barr, Amber Benson, Kurt Busiek, Amy Chu, Steve Englehart, Jane Espenson, Michael Eury, Danny Fingeroth, Christos Gage, Rick Geary, Phil Jiminez, Michael William Kaluta, Arie Kaplan, Barbara Kesel, Chip Kidd, Matt Kindt, Hope Larson, Paul Levitz, Steve Lieber, Marjorie Liu, Jean-Marc Lofficier, David Lloyd, Jay Lynch, Heidi MacDonald, Scott McCloud, Don McGregor, Lee Meriwether, Dennis O'Neil, David Peterson, Jerry Robinson, Trina Robbins, Peter Sanderson, Seth, Gail Simone, J. Michael Straczynski, Michael Uslan, Rick Veitch, Mark Waid, Len Wein, Adam West, and Bill Willingham. The conference is held concurrently with the international comic book convention in order to facilitate comic book professionals' involvement.

== See also ==
- Comics studies
