= Chris Roberson (author) =

American writer (born 1970)

- Roberson at Rose City Comic Con 2026
- Born: John Christian Roberson; August 25, 1970 (age 56)
- Education: University of Texas at Austin (BA)
- Occupations: Author, publisher
- Spouse: Allison Baker
- Children: 1
- Website: www.chrisroberson.net

John Christian Roberson (born August 25, 1970), known professionally as Chris Roberson, is an American science fiction author and publisher who is best known for alternate history novels and short stories.

== Early life ==
Roberson grew up near Dallas, Texas, and attended the University of Texas at Austin. After graduating with a degree in English literature and a minor in history, he leaned towards becoming a literary, post-modernist writer and penned a couple of novels in that style, which went unpublished as Roberson realized that he "wasn't depressed enough for that line of work". In the 1990s, Roberson wrote a couple of mystery novels but the end results turned out to be a mix of mystery and science fiction genres, so the publishers specializing in either of those rejected them. Ultimately, Roberson settled on writing science fiction, citing his upbringing in the 1970s and 1980s as the major inspiration, since the genre was particularly commonplace in America at that time:

"Everything from Saturday-morning cartoons to comic books to late-night B-movies to pulp novel reprints to blockbuster summer movies--it was all science fiction, in one form or another."

During this period, Roberson had a variety of day jobs, such as a product support engineer for Dell computers, a position he held for seven years and quit in 2003 to concentrate on his work as a writer and publisher.

== Career ==
Between 1998 and 2002, Roberson was part of the writer's collective Clockwork Storybook, alongside comic book creators Bill Willingham (of Elementals and, later, Fables fame), Lilah Sturges (who would go on to co-write Jack of Fables with Willingham and relaunch House of Mystery for Vertigo) and Mark Finn (also a Robert E. Howard scholar and playwright). Starting as a writing group, Clockwork Storybook developed into a monthly online anthology, then a publishing imprint of the same name. The collective attempted to capitalize on the growing trend of print on demand and launched with four print titles in early 2001. Roberson produced four novels for Clockwork Storybook, three of which were subsequently expanded and reprinted: Voices of Thunder (Feb. 2001) was revised to become Book of Secrets (Angry Robot, 2009), Set the Seas on Fire (Dec. 2001) was expanded for its 2007 release by Solaris, while Any Time at All (Sep. 2002) became Here, There and Everywhere (Pyr, 2005).

After the dissolution of Clockwork Storybook, Roberson decided to focus on his career as a writer and soon after made his first professional sale with the short story for the Live without a Net anthology, edited by Lou Anders and published by Roc. The book was published in 2003 and paved the way for future sales to Asimov's Science Fiction and other anthologies such as Tales of the Shadowmen, Postscripts, Black October Magazine, Fantastic Metropolis, RevolutionSF, Twilight Tales, Opi8, Alien Skin, Electric Velocipede, Subterranean Magazine and Lone Star Stories. The following year, Anders, whom Roberson considered "something of a personal patron", was hired as an editorial director at Prometheus Books' new science fiction imprint Pyr and bought Roberson's Here, There and Everywhere, the first novel in his Bonaventure-Carmody series.

In 2003, Roberson also started up his own small-press publishing house MonkeyBrain, having "discovered <...> in the few years of helping run the CWSB imprint, that [he] really enjoyed being a publisher." Roberson, who runs MonkeyBrain along with his business partner and spouse Allison Baker, decided early on that the company would deal exclusively in "traditional offset trade-paperbacks and hardcovers," distributed internationally, rather than printed on demand. In November, 2005, Roberson edited the first volume in a projected annual series of Adventure anthologies, comprising "original fiction in the spirit of early twentieth-century pulp fiction magazines" across the genres, featuring contributions from Lou Anders, Mark Finn, Paul Di Filippo, Michael Moorcock and Kim Newman.

At the 2008 San Diego Comic-Con, it was announced that Roberson was set to write a comic book mini-series set in the universe of the Vertigo series Fables, which was created by fellow former Clockwork Storybook author Bill Willingham. The mini-series, titled Cinderella: From Fabletown with Love and illustrated by Shawn McManus, was described by Roberson as featuring "spies, sex, and shoes." In late 2010, Roberson was selected by DC Comics to complete the "Grounded" story arc in the Superman ongoing series, which he worked on alongside his creator-owned Vertigo series iZombie and the Cinderella: From Fabletown with Love sequel mini-series, subtitled Fables are Forever. In 2012, Roberson announced he would no longer write for DC Comics due to their unethical treatment of creators. That same year, MonkeyBrain launched a new publishing arm for creator-owned comics that would focus solely on digital distribution through Comixology.

== Personal life ==
Roberson lives in Portland, Oregon, with his son.

== Awards and nominations ==
Roberson is a four-time nominee for the World Fantasy Award: as a writer in 2004, an editor and a publisher in 2006 and again a publisher in 2008. He was also nominated for the John W. Campbell Award for Best New Writer on two occasions. In 2009, Roberson won the Sidewise Award for Alternate History in the "Long Form" category for The Dragon's Nine Sons. He has also been nominated twice in the "Short Form" category, winning in 2004 with his story "O One". Roberson's novel Paragaea was included in Waterstone's "Top Ten Science Fiction" list in 2006.

== Bibliography ==
=== Clockwork Storybook ===
Novels published during Roberson's time as part of Clockwork Storybook:

- Voices of Thunder (sc, 322 pages, 2001, ISBN 0-9704841-0-0)
- Cybermancy, Incorporated (sc, 356 pages, 2001, ISBN 0-9704841-6-X)
- Set the Seas on Fire (sc, 272 pages, 2001, ISBN 0-9704841-9-4)
- Any Time at All (sc, 212 pages, 2002, ISBN 1-932004-00-9)

=== Bonaventure-Carmody ===
Tales of the Bonaventure-Carmody clan, which Roberson first started developing for his Clockwork Storybook novels, continued with a number of short stories:

Year	Title	Source	Publisher	Notes
2002	"Nowhere Man"	opi8.com	OPi8	Published with an illustration by Lee Kohse
2006	"The Jewel of Leystall"	Cross Plains Universe	MonkeyBrain	ISBN 1-932265-22-8
2008	"Death on the Crosstime Express"	Sideways in Crime	Solaris	ISBN 1-84416-566-3
2008	"Ill Met in Elvera"	pyrsamples.blogspot.com	Pyr	
2009	"The Funeral Affair"			Originally written as part of Roberson's debut novel Voices of Thunder; First published online as a "polished" version via Roberson's blog
2009	"Edison's Frankenstein"	Postscripts #20/21	PS Publishing	ISBN 1-84863-047-6
2010	"A Knight of Ghosts and Shadows"	Masked	Gallery Books	ISBN 1-4391-6882-2
2013	"Mariner"	Old Mars	Bantam	ISBN 0-345-53727-0

The series was subsequently expanded with several revised editions of his Clockwork Storybook novels as well as two newly written entries:

- Here, There and Everywhere (hc, 282 pages, Pyr, 2005, ISBN 1-59102-310-6; sc, 2005, ISBN 1-59102-331-9)
  - Revised and expanded reprint of Any Time at All (2002)
- Paragaea: A Planetary Romance (hc, 400 pages, Pyr, 2006, ISBN 1-59102-440-4; sc, 2006, ISBN 1-59102-444-7)
- Set the Seas on Fire (sc, 380 pages, Solaris, 2007, ISBN 1-84416-488-8)
  - Revised and expanded reprint of Set the Seas on Fire (2001)
- End of the Century (sc, 485 pages, Pyr, 2009, ISBN 1-59102-697-0)
- Book of Secrets (sc, 384 pages, Angry Robot, 2009, ISBN 0-00-732245-3)
  - Revised and expanded reprint of Voices of Thunder (2001)

=== Celestial Empire ===
Roberson's alternate history series Celestial Empire began with a number of short stories, which can be sorted in internal chronological order or the publication order:

Year	Title	#	Source	Publisher	Notes
2003	"O One"	4	Live without a Net	Roc	ISBN 0-451-45925-3
2004	"Red Hands, Black Hands"	9	Asimov's Science Fiction vol. 28 #12	Penny Publications	
2005	"Gold Mountain"	6	Postscripts #5	PS Publishing	ISBN 1-904619-42-8
2007	"The Sky is Large and the Earth is Small"	3	Asimov's Science Fiction vol. 31 #7	Dell Magazines	
2007	"Fire in the Lake"	1	Subterranean Online (Fall 2007)	Subterranean Press	
2007	"History Repurposed: The Celestial Empire Stories"		Vector #254	British Science Fiction Association	Essay
2007	"Metal Dragon Year"	5	Interzone #213		
2008	"The Line of Dichotomy"	8	The Solaris Book of New Science Fiction Volume 2	Solaris	ISBN 1-84416-542-6
2008	"Thy Saffron Wings"	2	Postscripts #15	PS Publishing	ISBN 1-906301-34-4
2008	"Mirror of Fiery Brightness"	7	Subterranean Online (Fall 2008)	Subterranean Press	
2009	"Dragon King of the Eastern Sea"	11	We Think, Therefore We Are	DAW Books	ISBN 0-7564-0533-5
2009	"All Under Heaven"	10	Firebirds Soaring	Firebird	ISBN 0-14-240552-3
2010	"Wonder House"	12	Asimov's Science Fiction vol. 34 #1	Dell Magazines	

The series was further expanded with one novella and three full-length novels:

- The Voyage of Night Shining White (hc, 84 pages, PS Publishing, 2006, ISBN 1-904619-70-3; sc, 2006, ISBN 1-904619-69-X)
- The Dragon's Nine Sons (sc, 416 pages, Solaris, 2008, ISBN 1-84416-619-8)
- Iron Jaw and Hummingbird (hc, 368 pages, Viking, 2008, ISBN 0-670-06236-7)
- Three Unbroken (sc, 416 pages, Solaris, 2009, ISBN 1-84416-707-0)
  - Serialized online via Solaris' website between 2007 and 2008.

=== Miscellaneous works ===
==== Short stories ====
Year	Title	Source	Publisher	Notes
2001	"Lord Peter Midnight and the Goblin King"	fantasticmetropolis.com	Gabe Chouinard	Published with an illustration by Gerald Brom
2003	"Long Night, Holy Night"	twilighttales.com	Twilight Tales	
2003	"Likeness of a Wolf"	twilighttales.com	Twilight Tales	
2004	"Wishes"	Lone Star Stories #1	Eric T. Marin	
2004	"Granma Stemple"	alienskinmag.com	Froggy Bottom Press	
2004	"So Far from Us in All Ways"	The Many Faces of Van Helsing	Ace Books	ISBN 0-441-01170-5
2004	"In the Frozen City"	Electric Velocipede #7	Spilt Milk Press	
2004	"In Sheep's Clothing"	Black October Magazine #6	John DiDomenico	
2005	"Penumbra"	Tales of the Shadowmen Volume 1	Black Coat Press	ISBN 1-932983-36-8
2005	"The Trouble with Superman"	Space Squid #1	Space Squid Press	
2005	"Prowl Unceasing"	Adventure	MonkeyBrain	ISBN 1-932265-13-9; Roberson also edited this anthology
2006	"Contagion"	FutureShocks	Roc	ISBN 0-451-46065-0
2006	"Annus Mirabilis"	Tales of the Shadowmen Volume 2	Black Coat Press	ISBN 1-932983-60-0
2006	"Companion to Owls"	Asimov's Science Fiction vol. 30 #3	Dell Magazines	
2006	"Last"	Subterranean Magazine #4	Subterranean Press	
2006	"Strange Sounding Names"	Continuum Science Fiction #6	HiTek Designs	
2006	"Eventide"	Forbidden Planets	DAW Books	ISBN 0-7564-0330-8
2007	"The Famous Ape"	Tales of the Shadowmen Volume 3	Black Coat Press	ISBN 1-932983-77-5
2007	"The End of Now"	Short Trips: Destination Prague	Big Finish	ISBN 1-84435-253-6
2007	"Monster Radio"	This is My Funniest 2	BenBella	ISBN 1-933771-22-4
2007	"And Such Small Deer"	The Solaris Book of New Fantasy	Solaris	ISBN 1-84416-523-X
2008	"Brave New World"	Star Trek: Myriad Universes — Echoes and Refractions	Pocket Books	ISBN 1-4165-7181-7
2008	"Merridew of Abominable Memory"	Gaslight Grimoire	EDGE Publishing	ISBN 1-894063-17-1
2009	"The Improbable Legend of Quick Johnny"	Electric Velocipede #17/18	Spilt Milk Press	
2009	"Gauntlet Run"	Heroes of the Space Marines	Black Library	ISBN 1-84416-730-5
2009	"Sojourner"	Under the Rose	Norilana	ISBN 1-60762-042-1; Co-written by Roberson and Lou Anders
2010	"His Majesty's Menagerie"	Shimmer Magazine #11		
2010	"The Final Flight of Greatheart Silver"	The Worlds of Philip José Farmer: Protean Dimensions	Meteor House	ISBN 0-615-37005-5
2011	"LARP on Mars"	Life on Mars: Tales from the New Frontier	Viking	ISBN 0-670-01216-5
2017	"The Other Side of Summer"	Hellboy: An Assortment of Horrors	Dark Horse	ISBN 1-5067-0343-7
2019	"Last Shot"	Scarlet Traces: A War of the Worlds Anthology	Abaddon	ISBN 1-78108-746-6

==== Novels ====
Year	Title	Series	Publisher	ISBN	Notes
2005	Sharkboy and Lavagirl Adventures: The Day Dreamer	Sharkboy and Lavagirl	TroubleMaker Publishing	1-933104-04-X (Hardcover, 162 pages)	Co-written by Roberson and Robert Rodriguez
2005	Sharkboy and Lavagirl Adventures: Return to Planet Drool	Sharkboy and Lavagirl	TroubleMaker Publishing	1-933104-05-8 (Hardcover, 148 pages)	Co-written by Roberson and Robert Rodriguez
2007	X-Men: The Return	X-Men	Pocket Star	1-4165-1075-3 (Paperback, 320 pages)	
2009	Dawn of War II	Warhammer 40,000	Black Library	1-84416-687-2 (Paperback, 400 pages)	
2010	Sons of Dorn	Warhammer 40,000	Black Library	1-84416-788-7 (Paperback, 414 pages)	
2012	Further: Beyond the Threshold		47North	1-61218-243-7 (Paperback, 352 pages)	
2016	Firewalk	Recondito	Night Shade	1-59780-879-2 (Paperback, 348 pages)	
2018	Firewalkers	Recondito	Night Shade	1-59780-912-8 (Paperback, 292 pages)	
2020	Zombie Army: Fortress of the Dead	Zombie Army	Abaddon	1-78108-854-3 (Paperback, 310 pages)	

=== Comics ===
==== DC Comics ====
- Vertigo:
  - House of Mystery vol. 2 #13: "13th Time's the Charm" (with Neal Adams and Josh Adams, co-feature, 2009)
    - Collected in House of Mystery: The Space Between (tpb, 128 pages, 2010, ISBN 1-4012-2581-0)
  - Fables:
    - Jack of Fables #36: "Jack 'n' Apes" (with Tony Akins, 2009)
      - Collected in Jack of Fables: The New Adventures of Jack and Jack (tpb, 128 pages, 2010, ISBN 1-4012-2712-0)
      - Collected in Jack of Fables: The Deluxe Edition Volume 3 (hc, 400 pages, 2020, ISBN 1-4012-9579-7)
    - Cinderella (with Shawn McManus):
      - Cinderella: From Fabletown with Love #1–6 (2010) collected as Cinderella: From Fabletown with Love (tpb, 144 pages, 2010, ISBN 1-4012-2750-3)
      - Cinderella: Fables are Forever #1–6 (2011) collected as Cinderella: Fables are Forever (tpb, 160 pages, 2012, ISBN 1-4012-3385-6)
    - Another six-issue Cinderella story by Roberson and McManus was supposed to be published as part of the Fairest anthology series.
    - After Roberson cut ties with DC, the story was eventually published in Fairest #21–26 with script by Marc Andreyko and art by McManus.
  - iZombie (with Mike Allred, Gilbert Hernandez (#12), Jay Stephens (#18), J. Bone (#21) and Jim Rugg (#24), 2010–2012) collected as:
    - Dead to the World (collects #1–5, tpb, 144 pages, 2011, ISBN 1-4012-2965-4)
      - Includes the "Trick or Treat!" short story (art by Mike Allred) from House of Mystery Halloween Annual #1 (2009)
    - uVampire (collects #6–12, tpb, 168 pages, 2011, ISBN 1-4012-3296-5)
      - Includes the "Devil's Lake" short story (art by Mike Allred) from House of Mystery Halloween Annual #2 (2010)
    - Six Feet Under and Rising (collects #13–18, tpb, 128 pages, 2012, ISBN 1-4012-3370-8)
    - Repossession (collects #19–28, tpb, 224 pages, 2012, ISBN 1-4012-3697-9)
    - Omnibus (collects #1–28 and the short stories from House of Mystery Halloween Annual #1–2, hc, 656 pages, 2015, ISBN 1-4012-6203-1)
- Superman/Batman #79–80: "World's Finest" (with Jesús Merino, 2011)
  - Collected in Superman/Batman: Sorcerer Kings (hc, 160 pages, 2011, ISBN 1-4012-3266-3; tpb, 2012, ISBN 1-4012-3446-1)
  - Collected in DC One Million Omnibus (hc, 1,080 pages, 2013, ISBN 1-4012-4243-X)
- Superman #707–711, 713–714: "Grounded" (with Allan Goldman (#707 and 709), Eddy Barrows, Travel Foreman (#710), Diogenes Neves (#713) and Jamal Igle (#713–714), 2011)
  - Roberson picked up the writing duties after J. Michael Straczynski left the title in the middle of the storyline; Straczynski is credited as a co-writer on all of Roberson's issues.
  - The story originally intended for publication in issue #712 (written by Roberson, art by Eddy Barrows) was cancelled on the day of release despite being fully drawn and lettered.
  - A previously unpublished story, unrelated to the "Grounded" storyline (written by Kurt Busiek, drawn by Rick Leonardi), was released as issue #712 instead.
  - All eight issues are collected as Superman: Grounded Volume 2 (hc, 168 pages, 2011, ISBN 1-4012-3316-3; tpb, 2012, ISBN 1-4012-3532-8)

==== Boom! Studios ====
- Do Androids Dream of Electric Sheep?: Dust to Dust (with Robert Adler, 2010) collected as:
  - Volume 1 (collects #1–4, tpb, 112 pages, 2010, ISBN 1-60886-027-2)
  - Volume 2 (collects #5–8, tpb, 112 pages, 2011, ISBN 1-60886-618-1)
- Starborn (co-created by Roberson and Stan Lee; written by Roberson, art by Khary Randolph and Matteo Scalera (#10), 2010–2011) collected as:
  - Volume 1 (collects #1–4, tpb, 128 pages, 2011, ISBN 1-60886-059-0)
  - Volume 2 (collects #5–8, tpb, 128 pages, 2011, ISBN 1-60886-064-7)
  - Volume 3 (collects #9–12, tpb, 128 pages, 2012, ISBN 1-60886-088-4)
- Elric: The Balance Lost (with Francesco Biagini, 2011–2012) collected as:
  - Volume 1 (collects #1–4, tpb, 128 pages, 2012, ISBN 1-60886-048-5)
  - Volume 2 (collects #5–8, tpb, 128 pages, 2012, ISBN 1-60886-066-3)
  - Volume 3 (collects #9–12, tpb, 128 pages, 2012, ISBN 1-60886-278-X)
- Adventure Time #5: "Ice King Dumb" (co-written by Roberson and his daughter Georgia, art by Lucy Knisley, co-feature, KaBOOM!, 2012)
  - Collected in Adventure Time: Sugary Shorts Volume 1 (hc, 128 pages, 2013, ISBN 1-60886-333-6; tpb, 2014, ISBN 1-60886-361-1)

==== Dynamite Entertainment ====
- Masks #1–8 (with Alex Ross (#1) and Dennis Calero, 2012–2013) collected as Masks (tpb, 200 pages, 2013, ISBN 1-60690-422-1)
- The Shadow:
  - The Shadow vol. 5 (with Giovanni Timpano and Andrea Mutti (#19), 2013–2014) collected as:
    - The Light of the World (collects #13–18, tpb, 168 pages, 2014, ISBN 1-60690-461-2)
    - Bitter Fruit (collects #19–25, tpb, 180 pages, 2014, ISBN 1-60690-519-8)
  - The Shadow #100 (with Ivan Rodriguez — both creators are uncredited; untitled 8-page story in the anthology special, 2015)
- Codename: Action #1–5 (with Jonathan Lau, 2013–2014) collected as Codename: Action (tpb, 128 pages, 2014, ISBN 1-60690-476-0)
- Doc Savage:
  - Doc Savage vol. 6 #1–8 (with Bilquis Evely, 2013–2014) collected as Doc Savage Omnibus (tpb, 240 pages, 2015, ISBN 1-60690-583-X)
  - Doc Savage: The Spider's Web #1–5 (with Cezar Razek, 2015–2016) collected as Doc Savage: The Spider's Web (tpb, 120 pages, 2016, ISBN 1-5241-0056-0)

==== Dark Horse Comics ====
- Prometheus: The Complete Fire and Stone (hc, 480 pages, 2015, ISBN 1-61655-772-9) includes:
  - Dark Horse Presents vol. 3 #2: "Aliens: Field Report" (with Paul Lee, anthology, 2014)
  - Aliens: Fire and Stone #1–4 (with Patric Reynolds, 2014) also collected as Aliens: Fire and Stone (tpb, 112 pages, 2015, ISBN 1-61655-655-2)
- Hellboy Universe (with all stories co-written by Roberson and Mike Mignola):
  - Hellboy and the B.P.R.D.:
    - Hellboy and the B.P.R.D.: 1952–1954 (hc, 440 pages, 2021, ISBN 1-5067-2526-0) includes:
      - Hellboy Winter Special 2016: "Wandering Souls" (with Michael Walsh, anthology, 2016)
      - Hellboy and the B.P.R.D.: 1953 — Beyond the Fences #1–3 (with Paolo Rivera, 2016)
      - Hellboy and the B.P.R.D.: 1954 — Black Sun #1–2 (with Stephen Green, 2016)
      - Hellboy and the B.P.R.D.: 1954 — The Unreasoning Beast (with Patric Reynolds, one-shot, 2016)
      - Hellboy and the B.P.R.D.: 1954 — Ghost Moon #1–2 (with Brian Churilla, 2017)
    - Hellboy and the B.P.R.D.: 1955 (tpb, 144 pages, 2018, ISBN 1-5067-0531-6) collects:
      - Hellboy and the B.P.R.D.: 1955 — Secret Nature (with Shawn Martinbrough, one-shot, 2017)
      - Hellboy and the B.P.R.D.: 1955 — Occult Intelligence #1–3 (with Brian Churilla, 2017)
      - Hellboy and the B.P.R.D.: 1955 — Burning Season (with Paolo Rivera, one-shot, 2018)
    - Hellboy and the B.P.R.D.: 1956 (tpb, 168 pages, 2019, ISBN 1-5067-1105-7) collects:
      - Hellboy and the B.P.R.D.: 1956 #1–3 (with Yishan Li, Mike Norton and Michael Avon Oeming, 2018–2019)
      - Hellboy vs. Lobster Johnson: The Ring of Death (with Mike Norton and Paul Grist, one-shot, 2019)
    - Hellboy and the B.P.R.D.: 1957 (tpb, 152 pages, 2023, ISBN 1-5067-2845-6) collects:
      - Hellboy and the B.P.R.D.: 1957 — Family Ties (with Laurence Campbell, one-shot, 2021)
      - Hellboy and the B.P.R.D.: 1957 — Forgotten Lives (with Stephen Green, one-shot, 2022)
      - Hellboy and the B.P.R.D.: 1957 — Falling Sky (with Shawn Martinbrough, one-shot, 2022)
      - Hellboy and the B.P.R.D.: 1957 — Fearful Symmetry (with Alison Sampson, one-shot, 2023)
      - Hellboy and the B.P.R.D.: 1957 — From Below (with Mike Norton, one-shot, 2023)
  - B.P.R.D.:
    - B.P.R.D.: Hell on Earth #140–142 (with Mike Norton, 2016) collected in B.P.R.D.: Hell on Earth Volume 4 (hc, 416 pages, 2019, ISBN 1-5067-0654-1; tpb, 2022, ISBN 1-5067-2431-0)
    - Rise of the Black Flame #1–5 (with Christopher Mitten, 2016–2017) collected as Rise of the Black Flame (tpb, 144 pages, 2017, ISBN 1-5067-0155-8)
  - Witchfinder:
    - Witchfinder: City of the Dead #1–5 (with Ben Stenbeck, 2016) collected as Witchfinder: City of the Dead (tpb, 144 pages, 2017, ISBN 1-5067-0166-3)
    - Witchfinder: The Gates of Heaven #1–5 (with D'Israeli, 2018) collected as Witchfinder: The Gates of Heaven (tpb, 144 pages, 2019, ISBN 1-5067-0683-5)
    - Witchfinder: The Reign of Darkness #1–5 (with Christopher Mitten, 2019–2020) collected as Witchfinder: The Reign of Darkness (tpb, 144 pages, 2020, ISBN 1-5067-1406-4)
  - The Visitor: How and Why He Stayed (tpb, 144 pages, 2017, ISBN 1-5067-0345-3) collects:
    - The Visitor: How and Why He Stayed #1–5 (with Paul Grist, 2017)
    - Hellboy Winter Special 2017: "God Rest Ye Merry" (with Paul Grist, anthology, 2017)
  - Rasputin: The Voice of the Dragon #1–5 (with Christopher Mitten, 2017) collected as Rasputin: The Voice of the Dragon (tpb, 136 pages, 2018, ISBN 1-5067-0498-0)
  - The House of Lost Horizons: A Sarah Jewell Mystery (hc, 144 pages, 2022, ISBN 1-5067-2006-4) collects:
    - Hellboy Winter Special 2019: "The Longest Night" (with Leila del Duca, anthology, 2020)
    - The House of Lost Horizons: A Sarah Jewell Mystery #1–5 (with Leila del Duca, 2021)
  - Hellboy: The Silver Lantern Club #1–5 (with Ben Stenbeck and Christopher Mitten, 2021–2022) collected as Hellboy: The Silver Lantern Club (hc, 136 pages, 2022, ISBN 1-5067-2816-2)
  - British Paranormal Society: Time Out of Mind #1–4 (with Andrea Mutti, 2022) collected as British Paranormal Society: Time Out of Mind (hc, 112 pages, 2023, ISBN 1-5067-3260-7)
  - Panya: The Mummy's Curse #1–4 (with Christopher Mitten, 2023) collected as Panya: The Mummy's Curse (hc, 112 pages, 2024, ISBN 1-5067-3819-2)
- Firefly: Legacy Edition Book Two (tpb, 336 pages, Boom! Studios, 2019, ISBN 1-68415-308-5) includes:
  - Free Comic Book Day 2016: Serenity: "The Warrior and the Wind" (with Stephen Byrne, co-feature in one-shot, 2016)
  - Serenity: Firefly Class 03-K64 — No Power in the 'Verse #1–6 (with Georges Jeanty, 2016–2017)
- God of War (with Tony Parker):
  - God of War vol. 2 #0–4 (2018–2019) collected as God of War (tpb, 120 pages, 2019, ISBN 1-5067-0746-7)
  - God of War: Fallen God #1–4 (2021) collected as God of War: Fallen God (tpb, 96 pages, 2021, ISBN 1-5067-1872-8)
- Stranger Things Winter Special (with Abel, 2021) collected in Stranger Things Holiday Specials (tpb, 128 pages, 2022, ISBN 1-5067-3458-8)

==== Other publishers ====
- IDW Publishing:
  - Star Trek/Legion of Super-Heroes #1–6 (with Jeff Moy, 2011–2012) collected as Star Trek/Legion of Super-Heroes (hc, 152 pages, 2012, ISBN 1-61377-230-0; tpb, 2013, ISBN 1-61377-660-8)
  - Memorial (with Rich Ellis):
    - Memorial #1–6 (2011–2012) collected as Memorial (hc, 148 pages, 2012, ISBN 1-61377-354-4)
    - Memorial: Imaginary Fiends #1–9 (digital, 2012–2013) published in print as Memorial: Imaginary Fiends #1–3 (2013)
- Edison Rex (with Dennis Culver):
  - Edison Rex #1–18 (self-published digitally via MonkeyBrain, 2012–2016) partially collected in print by IDW Publishing as:
    - Into the White! (collects #1–6, tpb, 120 pages, 2013, ISBN 1-61377-654-3)
    - Heir Apparent (collects #7–12, tpb, 120 pages, 2014, ISBN 1-61377-916-X)
  - Defend Comics: "The Amendment That Made a Right Out of 'Wrong'" (anthology one-shot, 2014)
  - Rise: Comics Against Bullying #1: "Be Yourself" (anthology, Northwest Press, 2015)
- Image:
  - Liberty Annual '12: "Sasquatch" (with Roger Langridge, anthology, 2012) collected in CBLDF Presents: Liberty (hc, 216 pages, 2014, ISBN 1-60706-937-7; tpb, 2016, ISBN 1-60706-996-2)
  - Sovereign #1–5 (with Paul Maybury, 2014) collected as Sovereign (tpb, 136 pages, 2014, ISBN 1-63215-144-8)
- The Mysterious Strangers #1–6 (with Scott Kowalchuk, Oni Press, 2013) collected as The Mysterious Strangers: Strange Ways (tpb, 152 pages, 2014, ISBN 1-62010-111-4)
- Black Bag #1–6 (with J. B. Bastos, Legendary, 2015–2016) collected as Black Bag (tpb, 144 pages, 2016, ISBN 1-68116-027-7)
- Call of Duty: Black Ops 4 — The Official Comic Collection (hc, 240 pages, 2019, ISBN 1-945683-94-5) includes:
  - Call of Duty: Black Ops 4 (free digital comics, Activision, 2018):
    - "Ruin" (with Débora Caritá, in #1)
    - "Seraph" (with Tony Shasteen, in #8)

Preceded by J. Michael Straczynski	Superman writer 2011	Succeeded by George Pérez
