= Literary Swordsmen and Sorcerers =

1976 work of collective biography by L. Sprague de Camp

Literary Swordsmen and Sorcerers: the Makers of Heroic Fantasy
- Dust-jacket illustration by Tim Kirk for Literary Swordsmen and Sorcerers
- Author: L. Sprague de Camp
- Cover artist: Tim Kirk
- Language: English
- Subject: biography
- Publisher: Arkham House
- Publication date: 1976
- Publication place: United States
- Media type: Print (Hardback)
- Pages: xxix, 313 pp
- ISBN: 0-87054-076-9
- OCLC: 2782776
- Dewey Decimal: 809/.933/7
- LC Class: PR830.F3 D4

Literary Swordsmen and Sorcerers: The Makers of Heroic Fantasy is a work of collective biography on the formative authors of the heroic fantasy genre by L. Sprague de Camp (1907–2000), first published in 1976 by Arkham House in an edition of 5,431 copies. Nine chapters (2–10) are revisions from a series of ten articles, also titled "Literary Swordsmen and Sorcerers," that initially appeared in the magazine Fantastic and the fanzine Amra between 1971 and 1976 (the tenth article, on L. Ron Hubbard, was omitted from the book). A French edition was issued in May 2010 under the title Les pionniers de la fantasy, and an ebook edition was issued in June 2014 by Gateway/Orion.

== Summary ==
The work presents the history of the genre through a discussion of the lives and works of its most important early writers. After a general survey of the development of modern fantasy, individual chapters deal with William Morris, Lord Dunsany, H. P. Lovecraft, E. R. Eddison, Robert E. Howard, Fletcher Pratt, Clark Ashton Smith, J. R. R. Tolkien, and T. H. White. A final chapter concerns lesser or later literary lights C. L. Moore, Leslie Barringer, Nictzin Dyalhis, Clifford Ball, Henry Kuttner, Norvell W. Page and Fritz Leiber.

The book also includes an introduction by de Camp's colleague Lin Carter, who remedies what he considers de Camp's most egregious omission by providing a profile of de Camp himself (also a formative author in the genre).

== Contents ==
- "Introduction: Neomythology", by Lin Carter
- Chapter I. "The Swords of Faërie"
- Chapter II "Jack of All Arts: William Morris"
- Chapter III. "Two Men in One: Lord Dunsany"
- Chapter IV. "Eldritch Yankee Gentleman: H. P. Lovecraft"
- Chapter V. "Superman in a Bowler: E.R. Eddison"
- Chapter VI. "The Miscast Barbarian: Robert E. Howard"
- Chapter VII. "Parallel Worlds: Fletcher Pratt"
- Chapter VIII. "Sierran Shaman: Clark Ashton Smith"
- Chapter IX. "Merlin in Tweeds: J.R.R. Tolkien"
- Chapter X. "The Architect of Camelot: T.H. White"
- Chapter XI. "Conan's Compeers"
- Notes
- Index

== Reception ==
Reaction to the book was largely positive. Richard A. Lupoff declared that it would "almost instantly become a standard reference" and praised de Camp as "an honest, thoroughgoing, and effective researcher.

Charles Bishop called it an "excellent survey of fantasy that avoids the plodding monotony of most surveys of this sort and that should be of equal interest to the rabid fan and the general reader alike." He felt the author, "himself a master of the genre," "seems to have read every work of fantasy there is, but he is neither pedantic nor hagiographic" and considered him "a pleasant writer to read and a solid critic with an enormous knowledge of his subject" who "surveys [each] life and work in an able and authoritative manner, mixing biography and criticism into a smooth narrative that brings the man and his writings vividly before our eyes."

Marshall B. Tymn considered the work a "major contribution to the study of heroic fantasy" covering "its leading practitioners whose works were central to the growth of the genre."

David Bratman called the book "the fullest expression of de Camp's love of heroic fantasy with great adventures and mighty heroes", a culmination of his pioneering work with Lin Carter in "piecing together a canon of the masterworks of this field." He noted that while "Carter carried this view of fantasy history to its great fruition as editor of the Ballantine Adult Fantasy series ... de Camp [had] first put the concept in print.

Brian M. Stableford, also noting de Camp's voluminous previous writings on fantasy, concurred that the "series of pieces written for Fantastic in the early 1970's" that went into the book were "of greater significance." He characterized the book as "a light and informal survey of the whole field of heroic fantasy [that] is perhaps the best introduction for the interested reader."

Contrasting notes on the work were struck by the reviewers of the Wilson Library Bulletin and Choice. Gary Kuris, Patrice Harper, Harriet E. Rosenfeld, and Wm. R. Eshelman, writing for the former, "found it to exhibit the same faults and virtues of de Camp's popular Lovecraft: A Biography," declaring it "woefully padded" and themselves "maddened by the author's implacable didacticism [and] infuriating inability to write two paragraphs without wandering into a lecture on Nietzsche, or dialectical materialism, or magazine-reading." They stated his "[l]iterary analyses rarely extend beyond the plot summary." However, they felt he "shines ... in his depiction of the authors themselves, some of whom were a lot stranger than their creations ... wields a mean wit," and that the reader's "[p]atience ... will be rewarded" despite "his endless perorations."

Choice felt "De Camp's 'study,' in style and manner as well as in substance, seldom rises above the level of a fan club newsletter," and its chapters "about as responsibly biographical as the gossip of a TV talk show," with his "idea of literary criticism ... the sort of plot rehashing that stumbles to concluding insights like: 'above all Robert Howard was a storyteller.'" It concluded, however, that "Adolescents of all ages, the Star Trek variety in particular, will eat it up."

== Relation to other works ==
De Camp also produced separate full-length biographies of two of the authors treated, H. P. Lovecraft (Lovecraft: A Biography (1975)) and Robert E. Howard (Dark Valley Destiny: the Life of Robert E. Howard (1983)).
