= Blood & Thunder: The Life & Art of Robert E. Howard =

2006 biography of Robert E. Howard by Mark Finn

- Cover of 1st edition of Blood & Thunder: The Life & Art of Robert E. Howard
- Author: Mark Finn
- Cover artist: John Picacio
- Language: English
- Genre: Biography
- Publisher: MonkeyBrain Books
- Publication date: 2006
- Publication place: United States
- Media type: Print (Trade paperback)
- Pages: 264 pp
- ISBN: 978-1-932265-21-7
- OCLC: 76742346
- Dewey Decimal: 813/.52 B 222
- LC Class: PS3515.O842 Z6155 2006

Blood & Thunder: The Life & Art of Robert E. Howard is a biography of the writer Robert E. Howard by Mark Finn, first published in a trade paperback edition in November 2006 by MonkeyBrain Books. A second, expanded and corrected edition was published in hardcover by The Robert E. Howard Foundation Press in January 2012; a trade paperback followed from the same publisher in 2013. Both editions include an introduction by suspense writer Joe R. Lansdale.

The work, an examination of the famous fantasy writer and creator of Conan the Barbarian, was the first major biography of Howard since Dark Valley Destiny: the Life of Robert E. Howard (1983) by L. Sprague de Camp, Catherine Crook de Camp and Jane Whittington Griffin. Finn's book was intended as a corrective to both the earlier biography and the various misconceptions about Howard that had accumulated since the writer's death.

== Contents (2nd edition) ==
- Introduction (Joe Lansdale)
- Part 1
  - The Oil Boom
  - Isaac and Hester
  - The Traveling Howards
  - Post Oak Country
- Part 2
  - Authentic Liars
  - The Tattle
  - Soda Jerk
  - The Deal
- Part 3
  - The Fighting Costigans
  - Lovecraft
  - Conan
- Part 4
  - Novalyne
  - Vultures and Grizzlies
  - All Fled, All done
  - Mythology
- Afterword
- Notes on the 2nd Edition
- Bibliography
- Index
- Title Index
- Acknowledgements

== Reception ==
According to Publishers Weekly, "Finn quietly and expertly demolishes ... misconceptions about Howard [and] discusses Howard in the context of a populist writer whose dyspeptic view of civilization was forged in the corrupt Texas oil boomtowns in which he grew up ... handl[ing] his charged subject in a straightforward, even-handed manner." The reviewer calls the work "a worthy addition to the 100th anniversary of Howard's birth that all readers of fantasy and regional fiction will enjoy."

Brian Murphy writes that "Finn has set the record straight on Howard's character," while finding the book's approach "as a counterpoint to ... Dark Valley Destiny ... "both admirable and, in a few places, limiting." While praising the work overall, he does take issue with a few of Finn's conclusions, "including one of his boldest: that Howard had no choice but to commit suicide." He sees its strength in its portrayal of Howard as "very much a product of his environment," finding "Finn's insights in these chapters are unique and insightful." Another strength, he feels, is that "[i]t opens up the wider world of Howard's books and other material about his life that may not be so widely known." He further notes that the last chapter "provides a great overview of the post-Howard years, including his resurgence in the Lancer paperback series of the 1960s and 70s, the 'Conan the Barbarian' boom sparked by the comic books and the movie of the same name, and the growth of critical studies dedicated to Howard's works." He concludes: "[i]n summary, Blood & Thunder is highly recommended for any Howard fan."

== Honors ==
Blood & Thunder was a finalist for the 2007 Locus Awards for Best Non-Fiction. For his work on the book, Finn was nominated for the 2007 World Fantasy Award in the Special Award Professional category. Finn won the Emerging Scholar plus the 2007 Awards for Outstanding Achievement, Book By A Single Author for Blood & Thunder.
