= Peter Coogan =

American comics scholar

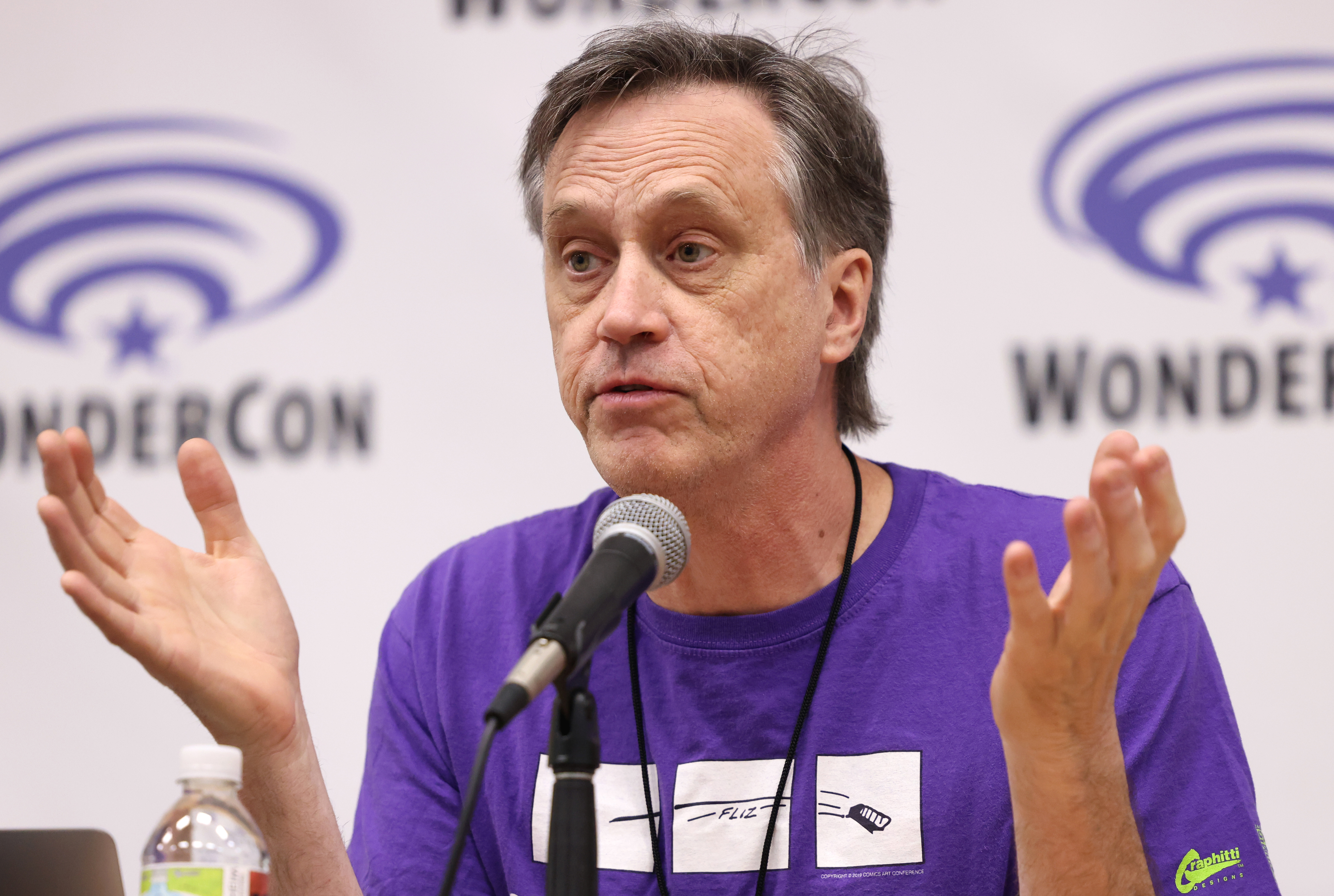
- Coogan in 2025
- Education: Michigan State University (PhD)
- Occupation: Comics scholar
- Writing career
- Subject: Comics studies
- Notable work: Superhero: The Secret Origin of a Genre

Peter M. Coogan (/ˈkuːɡən/) is an American comics scholar. He is the co-founder and co-chair of the Comics Arts Conference, which runs during San Diego Comic-Con and WonderCon. Since 2009 he has taught for the American Culture Studies Program at Washington University in St. Louis, and he served as the Communication Lab Coordinator at the George Warren Brown School of Social Work at Washington University in St. Louis from 2012 to 2024.

== Biography ==
Peter Coogan gained a doctorate in American Studies from Michigan State University, with his dissertation “The Secret Origin of the Superhero: The Emergence of the Superhero Genre in America from Daniel Boone to Batman” (2002), which he revised for wider publication in 2006 (see below).

He coined the term Wold-Newtonry in a paper titled "Wold-Newtonry: Theory and Methodology for the Literary Archeology of the Wold Newton Universe." In it, he talks about literary archaeology, a term which he says was inspired (for him) by Warren Ellis's term mystery archeologists in Ellis and Cassaday's Planetary comics. The paper is available online at Philip José Farmer's Wold Newton pages, and as a chapter in Win Scott Eckert's (ed.) Myths for the Modern Age book, published by MonkeyBrain Books.

Coogan co-edited (with Randall William Scott) the Comic Art Studies newsletter and also set up the Comics Studies Email service to "coordinate communication about comic scholarship." The newsletter's motto was Comica Amica Nobicum ("Comics Are Our Friends!") and originated from the Russel B. Nye Popular Culture Collection, to "facilitate communication about the Comic Art Collection at Michigan State University, and communication about public comics collecting and scholarship in general."

In 2005, Coogan presented a paper titled "The Definition of the Superhero" at the interdisciplinary Holy Men in Tights Superheroes Conference at the School of Art History, Cinema, Classics & Archaeology (AHCCA), University of Melbourne in Melbourne, Australia. In 2012, Coogan was awarded the Inkpot Award.

== Comics Arts Conference ==
Coogan is co-founder (with Randy Duncan), co-chair, and co-organizer of the Comics Arts Conference which is held annually at San Diego Comic-Con and at WonderCon. The purpose of the conference is to "bring together comics scholars, practitioners, critics, and historians who want to be involved in the dynamic process of evolving an aesthetic and a criticism of the comics art form."

== Superhero: The Secret Origin of a Genre ==
In 2006, MonkeyBrain Books published a much revised and expanded form of his dissertation as Superhero: The Secret Origin of a Genre (MonkeyBrain Press, 2006), with a foreword by Batman-legend Dennis O'Neil. The book's main purpose is to define the superhero genre, and produce a standard definition for the term itself. Coogan writes:

“The term superhero is often applied to all sorts of characters and people from Beowulf and Luke Skywalker to Tiger Woods and Michael Jordan. These applications come out of a metaphoric use of the term to describe characters and people who seem a step above others in their class, whether epic, science fiction, or sports.”

He draws a distinction between terms used as metaphors and terms used literally, concluding that - at least part of - the problem is a lack of scholarly definition of the superhero genre.

Comics writer and critic Peter Sanderson, in his "Comics in Context" columns dealing with Coogan's Superhero, summarizes the contention over the term "superhero" by noting that some fictional characters not "explicitly portrayed as superhuman... nonetheless perform feats that real people would be unlikely to duplicate," citing Luke Skywalker and Jack Bauer as two examples. Coogan's remit, therefore, is to clarify these issues and “provide a basis for the study of superheroes and help to make more studies possible in the future.” Sanderson also notes that Coogan - and his publisher, MonkeyBrain, who also publish Jess Nevins' annotations on Alan Moore's The League of Extraordinary Gentlemen - are not following the common trend in academic circles to largely ignore the superhero genre when comics are discussed.

Coogan seeks to define not merely the superhero as a character, but also the genre itself, thereby discussing not just individual attributes, but types of story, noting that the superhero:

“is generically distinct, i.e., can be distinguished from characters of related genres (fantasy, science fiction, detective, etc.) by a preponderance of genre conventions.”

Coogan's definition makes reference to DC's lawsuit against Victor Fox, who published Wonder Man in 1939 (not to be confused with the similarly named Marvel hero), in imitation of Superman. The presiding Judge Learned Hand identified three defining characteristics in his ruling^{(see: here)}, which form a key part of Coogan's argument:

“These three elements–mission, powers, and identity, establish the core of the genre.”

Peter Sanderson, noted Marvel Comics historian and author of the Comics in Context blog at QuickStopEntertainment, while not agreeing completely with Coogan's points, nevertheless states that the book "should become a basic text for study of the superhero genre," recommending it to all fans of the genre.

== Bibliography ==
- The 'Zine #1–5, 'zine, a publication of the Young Adults Breakfast Club (Kent, OH 1986–1987).
- "Science Fiction Comics" in Anatomy of Wonder 4 by Neil Barron (ed.) (pp. 673–689) (New Providence, NJ: R.R. Bowker, 1995).
- "Reading Comics : Language, Culture, and the Concept of the Superhero in Comic Books" in International Journal of Comic Art, v. 3, no. 1 (pp. 278–280) (Spring 2001).
- "Wold-Newtonry: Theory and Methodology for the Literary Archeology of the Wold Newton Universe" in Myths for the Modern Age: Philip Jose Farmer's Wold Newton Universe by Win Scott Eckert (ed.). MonkeyBrain (2005).
- Superhero: The Secret Origin of a Genre by Peter Coogan (Introduction by Denny O'Neil). MonkeyBrain (2006).
- What Is a Superhero? coedited with Robin Rosenberg. Oxford Academic Press (2013).
