= Live Without a Net (book) =

2003 anthology edited by Lou Anders

Cover art by John Picacio.

Live Without a Net is a science fiction anthology edited by Lou Anders, published by Roc in 2003. It included works by Stephen Baxter, David Brin, Paul Di Filippo, Mike Resnick & Kay Kenyon, Rudy Rucker, S. M. Stirling, and Michael Swanwick.

In an interview with Rick Kleffel, Anders noted part of his motivation for the anthology:

"I was reacting to what I felt was a preponderance of post-cyberpunk in American science fiction in the year 2000. The anthology was a deliberate attempt to counter that trend in some small and useful way."
