= Dark Valley Destiny =

1983 biography of Robert E. Howard

Dark Valley Destiny: the Life of Robert E. Howard
- Dust-jacket illustration for Dark Valley Destiny
- Author: L. Sprague de Camp, Catherine Crook de Camp and Jane Whittington Griffin
- Cover artist: Kevin Eugene Johnson
- Language: English
- Genre: Biography
- Publisher: Bluejay Books
- Publication date: 1983
- Publication place: United States
- Media type: Print (Hardback)
- Pages: 402 pp
- ISBN: 0-312-94074-2
- OCLC: 9945011
- Dewey Decimal: 813/.52 B 19
- LC Class: PS3515.O842 Z62 1983

Dark Valley Destiny: the Life of Robert E. Howard is a biography of the writer Robert E. Howard by science-fiction writer L. Sprague de Camp in collaboration with Catherine Crook de Camp and Jane Whittington Griffin, first published in hardcover by Bluejay Books in December 1983, and in trade paperback by the same publisher in May 1986. An E-book edition was published by Gollancz's SF Gateway imprint on September 29, 2011, as part of a general release of de Camp's works in electronic form.

== Summary ==
The work, an examination of the famous fantasy writer and creator of Conan the Barbarian, was the first major independent biography of Howard. It is an expansion of de Camp's earlier study The Miscast Barbarian: a Biography of Robert E. Howard (1975), itself an expansion of his article "The Miscast Barbarian", which appeared in the magazine Fantastic in June, 1971.

== Controversy ==
De Camp's "warts and all" approach to his subject has been branded by some fans as unflattering and unbalanced. For instance, Mark Finn, author of Blood & Thunder: The Life & Art of Robert E. Howard, argues that De Camp deliberately framed his questions about Robert Howard in order to elicit answers which matched his Freudian theories about the "neurotic" and "Oedipal" Howard.
