= The Miscast Barbarian =

1975 biography by science-fiction writer L. Sprague de Camp

The Miscast Barbarian: a Biography of Robert E. Howard
- Cover of the paperback edition The Miscast Barbarian published simultaneously with the hardcover edition.
- Author: L. Sprague de Camp
- Illustrator: Stephen E. Fabian, George Barr, Roy G. Krenkel and C. Lee Healy
- Cover artist: Charles McGill
- Language: English
- Genre: Biography
- Publisher: Gerry de la Ree
- Publication date: 1975
- Publication place: United States
- Media type: Print (Hardback and Paperback)
- Pages: 44 pp

The Miscast Barbarian: a Biography of Robert E. Howard is a biography by science-fiction writer L. Sprague de Camp, first published in hardcover and trade paperback in 1975 by Gerry de la Ree.

== Summary ==
The work is an examination of Robert E. Howard, the famous fantasy writer and creator of Conan the Barbarian.

== Relation to other works ==
The book is an expansion of de Camp's article "The Miscast Barbarian", which appeared in the magazine Fantastic in June, 1971. Later, in collaboration with Catherine Crook de Camp and Jane Whittington Griffin, he expanded the text again, into Dark Valley Destiny: the Life of Robert E. Howard (1983), the first major independent biography of Howard.
