= Kay Kenyon =

American novelist

- Born: July 2, 1956 (age 70)
- Writing career
- Genres: Science fiction, fantasy

Kay Kenyon (born July 2, 1956) is an American science fiction and fantasy writer currently living in Wenatchee, Washington. She wrote "The Entire and the Rose" and "Dark Talents" book series.

== Publications ==
- The Seeds of Time (Bantam Spectra; 1997)
- Leap Point (Bantam Spectra, 1998)
- Rift (Bantam Spectra, 1999)
- Tropic of Creation (Bantam Spectra, 2000)
- Maximum Ice (Bantam UK, 2002; Philip K. Dick Award nominee, 2003)
- The Braided World (Bantam UK, 2003; John W. Campbell Award nominee, 2004)

=== "The Entire and the Rose" ===
1. Bright of the Sky (Pyr, 2007)
2. A World Too Near (Pyr, 2008)
3. City Without End (Pyr, 2009)
4. Prince of Storms (Pyr, 2010)

=== "Dark Talents" ===
1. At the Table of Wolves (2017)
2. Serpent in the Heather (2018)
3. Nest of the Monarch (2019)
