= MonkeyBrain Books =

American publishing house

- Industry: Publishing
- Genre: Science fiction/fantasy
- Founder: Chris Roberson; Allison Baker
- Headquarters: Austin, Texas, United States
- Products: Books
- Website: Official website

MonkeyBrain Books (MonkeyBrain, Inc.) is an independent American publishing house based in Austin, Texas, specialising in books comprising both new content and reprinting online, international, or out-of-print content, which show "an academic interest," but which "reach a popular audience as well."

== History ==
Founded by science-fiction author Chris Roberson with his business partner and spouse Allison Baker, MonkeyBrain Books specializes in "genre fiction and nonfiction genre studies" after two years focusing solely on non-fiction.

After dabbling in self-publication and Print On Demand, Roberson said he wanted to ensure that his books were distributed widely.

== The League of Extraordinary Gentlemen ==
The first project MonkeyBrain Books published was a collection of companion notes to Alan Moore and Kevin O'Neill's 1999 comic book series The League of Extraordinary Gentlemen, Volume I: Heroes & Monsters: The Unofficial Companion to the League of Extraordinary Gentlemen, compiled by Texas-native Jess Nevins. It was nominated for an International Horror Guild Award and favorably reviewed in both Locus and The Magazine of Fantasy and Science Fiction, among other publications. The companion to The League of Extraordinary Gentlemen, Volume II followed in 2004, and in 2006, Titan Books published the UK versions of both titles. In 2008, the guide to The League of Extraordinary Gentlemen: Black Dossier was released.

== Other titles ==
Continuing its self-imposed remit to publish works of non-fiction genre studies, MonkeyBrain's debut titles (in December, 2003) also included a collection of short essays by Matthew Rossi, comprising a wide-ranging guide to numerous weird, odd, imaginary, and mythical places and things: Things That Never Were: Fantasies, Lunacies & Entertaining Lies, and a collection of articles/essays by Rick Klaw (many of which had appeared on his "Geeks with Books" column at SF Site) ruminating on everything from book-selling & signings, comics & science fiction and censorship: Geek Confidential: Echoes from the 21st Century. In 2004, MonkeyBrain's output included a substantially updated (around 25% new material) printing of Michael Moorcock's guide to Epic Fantasy, and The Discontinuity Guide, author and writer Paul Cornell (with Martin Day & Keith Topping)'s attempt to form a coherent narrative from decades of Doctor Who continuity. In 2005, alongside Philip Jose Farmer commentator Win Scott Eckert's guide to the Wold Newton Universe, the Locus award-nominated Myths for the Modern Age (whose contributors include Philip Jose Farmer and Jess Nevins, among others), Chris Roberson edited the first volume in a projected annual series of Adventure anthologies, comprising "original fiction in the spirit of early twentieth-century pulp fiction magazines" across the genres, featuring contributions from (among others) Lou Anders, Paul Di Filippo, Mark Finn, Michael Moorcock and Kim Newman.

In 2005 MonkeyBrain also published Jess Nevins' World Fantasy Award-nominated Encyclopedia of Fantastic Victoriana, the first comprehensive reference encyclopedia to the fantastic literature of the nineteenth century, while 2006 debuted MonkeyBrain's first art book, covering the work of John Picacio, MonkeyBrain's primary cover artist. Cementing MonkeyBrain's leap from non-fiction and reference genre works to include fiction, 2006 also saw publication of a collection of science fiction author Kim Newman's Richard Jeperson stories (a distillation of British spy-fi television) in The Man from the Diogenes Club, with a follow-up published the following year alongside Paul Cornell's imaginative science fiction novel British Summertime.

Robert E. Howard scholar Mark Finn's 2006 biography, Blood & Thunder: The Life & Art of Robert E. Howard, met with considerable critical praise, and not only won the 2007 Cimmerian Award, The Atlantean, but was also nominated for Locus and World Fantasy Awards.

In 2012, MonkeyBrain launched a new publishing arm for creator-owned comics that would focus solely on digital distribution through Comixology.

== Published works ==
- Things That Never Were: Fantasies, Lunacies & Entertaining Lies by Matthew Rossi (introduction by Paul Di Filippo) (25 Dec 2003)
- Heroes & Monsters: The Unofficial Companion to the League of Extraordinary Gentlemen by Jess Nevins (Introduction by Alan Moore) (25 Dec 2003)
- Geek Confidential: Echoes from the 21st Century by Rick Klaw (introduction by Michael Moorcock) (25 Dec 2003)
- Wizardry and Wild Romance: A Study of Epic Fantasy by Michael Moorcock (Introduction by China Miéville; Afterword by Jeff VanderMeer) (25 Oct 2004)
- Why Should I Cut Your Throat? by Jeff VanderMeer (25 Oct 2004)
- The DisContinuity Guide: The Unofficial Doctor Who Companion by Paul Cornell, Martin Day & Keith Topping (Foreword by Terrance Dicks) (25 Oct 2004)
- A Blazing World: The Unofficial Companion to the Second League of Extraordinary Gentlemen by Jess Nevins (Introduction by Alan Moore) (25 Oct 2004)
- Projections: Science Fiction in Literature and Film by Lou Anders (25 Dec 2004)
- Myths for the Modern Age: Philip Jose Farmer's Wold Newton Universe by Win Scott Eckert (25 Nov 2005)
- Adventure by Chris Roberson (ed.) (25 Nov 2005)
- The Encyclopedia of Fantastic Victoriana by Jess Nevins (Introduction by Michael Moorcock) (25 Dec 2005) - MonkeyBrain's first hardback
- Cross Plains Universe - Texans Celebrate Robert E. Howard by Scott A. Cupp & Joe R. Lansdale (ed.s) (2006)
- Cover Story: The Art of John Picacio by John Picacio (Introduction by Michael Moorcock) (25 May 2006)
- The Man from the Diogenes Club by Kim Newman (25 Jun 2006)
- Superhero: The Secret Origin of a Genre by Peter Coogan (Introduction by Denny O'Neil) (25 Jul 2006)
- The Hollow Earth by Rudy Rucker (25 Dec 2006)
- The Secret Files of the Diogenes Club by Kim Newman (25 Nov 2007)
- Blood & Thunder: The Life & Art of Robert E. Howard by Mark Finn (Introduction by Joe R. Lansdale) (25 Dec 2006)
- British Summertime by Paul Cornell (Paperback - 25 Jul 2007) - UK Hardback published by Gollancz, 2002
- Cenotaxis by Sean Williams (25 Dec 2007)
- Impossible Territories: An Unofficial Companion to The League of Extraordinary Gentlemen by Jess Nevins
- Escape From Hell! by Hal Duncan (Nov 2008)
- Two Hawks from Earth by Philip José Farmer (May 2009)
- Death of a Starship by Jay Lake (Dec 2009)
- Mysteries of the Diogenes Club by Kim Newman (2010)

=== MonkeyBrain Comics ===
- Edison Rex #1–18 (written by Chris Roberson, drawn by Dennis Culver, 2012–2016)
- Aesop's Ark #1–3 (written by J. Torres, drawn by Jennifer L. Meyer, 2012)
- The October Girl #1–4 (written and drawn by Matthew Dow Smith, 2012–2015)
- Amelia Cole (co-written by Adam P. Knave and D.J. Kirkbride, drawn by Nick Brokenshire):
  - Amelia Cole and the Unknown World #1–6 (2012–2013)
  - Amelia Cole and the Hidden War #1–6 (2013)
  - Amelia Cole and the Enemy Unleashed #1–6 (2014)
  - Amelia Cole and the Impossible Fate #1–6 (2014–2015)
  - Amelia Cole Versus the End of Everything #1–6 (2015–2016)
- Bandette #1–ongoing (written by Paul Tobin, drawn by Colleen Coover, 2012–...)
- Wander #1–4 (written by Kevin Church, drawn by Grace Allison, 2012–2014)
- Masks and Mobsters #1–10 (written by Joshua Williamson, drawn by Mike Henderson, Jason Copland (#4), Justin Greenwood (#6), Ryan Cody (#8) and Seth Damoose (#10), 2012–2013)
- Thoughts on a Winter Morning (written by Kurt Busiek, drawn by Steve Lieber, one-shot, 2012)
- The Stars Below (written by Zack Smith, drawn by Rich Ellis, one-shot, 2012)
- Spirit of the Law #1–2 (written by Brandon Seifert, drawn by Michael Montenat, 2012)
- Action Cats (co-written by Adam P. Knave and Lauren Vogelbaum, drawn by Eamon Dougherty, one-shot, 2012)
- Red Light Properties #1–13 (written and drawn by Dan Goldman, 2012–2014)
- Unfair (written by Vance Sumner, drawn by Sandy Jarrell, one-shot, 2013)
- Denali #1–2 (written by Jay Faerber, drawn by John Broglia, 2013)
- High Crimes #1–12 (written by Christopher Sebela, drawn by Ibrahim Moustafa, 2013–2015)
- Phabula #1 (written and drawn by Dalton Rose, 2013)
- The Red Panda (written by Gregg Taylor, drawn by Dean Kotz):
  - Mask of the Red Panda #1–3 (2013)
  - The Red Panda #1–10 (2014–2016)
- Frost #0–1 (co-written by Brandon Jerwa and Eric Trautmann, drawn by Giovanni Timpano, 2013)
- Artful Daggers #1–17 (co-written by Adam P. Knave and Sean E. Williams, drawn by Andrew Losq, 2013–2015)
- Skybreaker #1–5 (written by Michael Moreci, drawn by Drew Zucker, 2013–2014)
- Knuckleheads #1–8 (written by Brian Winkeler, drawn by Robert Wilson IV, 2013–2014)
- Theremin #1–4 (written by Curt Pires, drawn by Dalton Rose, 2013–2014)
- Kinski #1–6 (written and drawn by Gabriel Hardman, 2013–2014)
- Subatomic Party Girls #1–3 (co-written by Chris Sims and Chad Bowers, drawn by Erica Henderson, 2013–2014)
- Captain Ultimate #1–6 (co-written by Benjamin Bailey and Joey Esposito, drawn by Boykoesh, 2013–2014)
- Avery Fatbottom: Renaissance Fair Detective #1 (written and drawn by Jen Vaughn, 2013)
- Anti-Hero #1–10 (written by Jay Faerber, drawn by Nate Stockman, 2013–2014)
- Detectobot #0–1 (written by Peter Timony, drawn by Bobby Timony, 2013)
- Dropout #1 (written by Phil Hester, drawn by Tyler Walpole, 2013)
- Heartbreakers #1–8 (written by Anina Bennett, drawn by Paul Guinan, 2013–2015)
  - Stories originally published in Dark Horse Presents #35–37, Fifth Anniversary Special, 50–52 and 100-1 (anthology, 1989–1995)
- Inkshot (anthology one-shot edited by Hector Lima, 2013)
- Real West #1–3 (anthology edited by Chris Schweizer, 2013)
- BOO! Halloween Stories (anthology edited by Jon Morris):
  - BOO! Halloween Stories #1–4, 2014, 2015, 2016 (2013–2016)
  - BOO! 2014 Holiday Special (2014)
- Strange Nation #1–8 (written by Paul Allor, drawn by Juan Romera, 2013–2014)
- Code Monkey Save World #1–4 (written by Greg Pak, drawn by Takeshi Miyazawa, 2013–2014)
- The Army of Dr. Moreau #1–6 (written by David F. Walker, drawn by Carl Sciacchitano, 2013–2015)
- Old Red 203X #1 (written and drawn by Rory Morris, 2013)
- Amazing Forest #1–10 (co-written by Ulises Farinas and Erick Freitas, drawn by various artists, 2013–2015)
- The Double Life of Miranda Turner #1–9 (written by Jamie S. Rich, drawn by George Kambadais, 2013–2016)
- Prime-8s #1–2 (co-written by Michael Moreci and Steve Seeley, drawn by Kyle Latino, 2013–2014)
- D4VE #1–5 (written by Ryan Ferrier, drawn by Valentin Ramon, 2013–2014)
- Panels for Primates (anthology edited by Troy Wilson):
  - Panels for Primates (one-shot, 2013)
  - Panels for Primates Junior (one-shot, 2013)
- Art Monster #1–3 (written by Jeremy Holt, drawn by Francesca Ciregia, 2013–2014)
- Copernicus Jones: Robot Detective #1–7 (written by Matt D. Wilson, drawn by Kevin Warren, 2014–2015)
- The Remains #1–4 (written by Cullen Bunn, drawn by A. C. Zamudio, 2014)
- GoGetters #1 (written by Shawn Aldridge, drawn by Christopher Peterson, 2014)
- Headspace #1–8 (written by Ryan K. Lindsay, drawn by Eric Zawadzki, 2014–2015)
- The Fallen #1–4 (of 8 planned) (written by Alex De-Gruchy, drawn by Michael Montenat, 2014)
- Skinned #1–6 (co-written by Jeremy Holt and Tim Daniel, drawn by Joshua Gowdy, 2014–2016)
- Travel sketchbooks by Natalie Nourigat:
  - Amsterdam Sketchbook (one-shot, 2014)
  - Tally Marks #1–7 (2014–2015)
- Henchmen, Inc. #1–2 (written by Tim Simmons, drawn by Jim McMunn, 2014–2015)
- Street Angel #1–5 (co-written by Jim Rugg and Brian Maruca, drawn by Jim Rugg, 2014)
  - Stories originally published in Street Angel #1–5 (SLG Publishing, 2004–2005)
- Behemoth #1–4 (written by Chris Kipiniak, drawn by J. K. Woodward, 2015)
- Kings and Canvas #0–5 (written by Neil Kleid, drawn by Jake Allen, 2015–2016)
