= Mark Finn =

American novelist

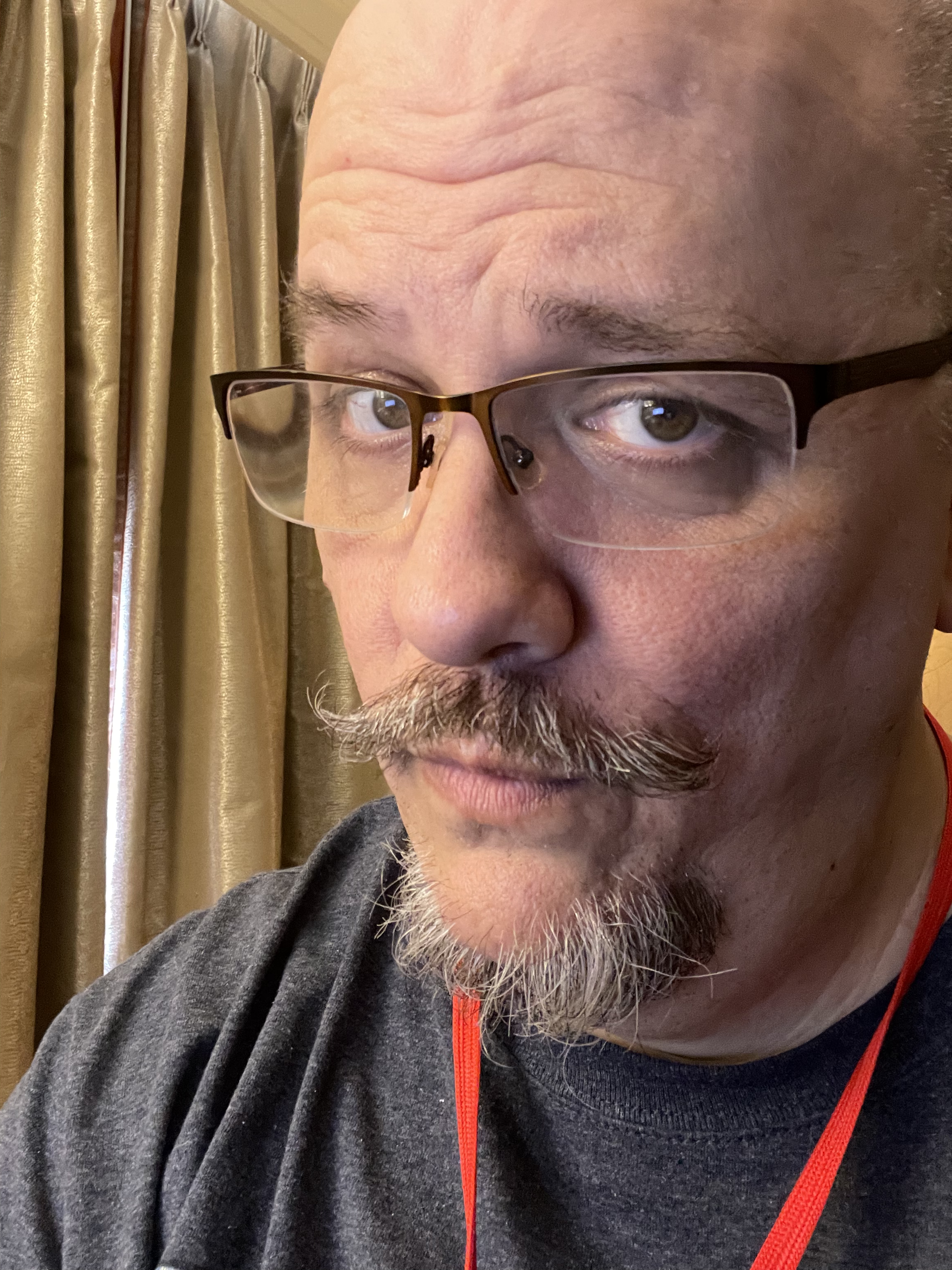
- Born: October 1969 (age 56)
- Occupations: Writer, Biographer
- Writing career
- Notable works: Blood & Thunder: The Life & Art of Robert E. Howard

Mark Finn (born October 1969) is an American science fiction and fantasy writer, essayist, and playwright. In 2007 he was nominated for World Fantasy Special Award: Professional.

== Biography ==
Finn's earliest published work was a series of comic book stories that he wrote and drew for Absolute Comics, notably the “Punk” series he created with William Traxtle and Shane Campos, among others, from 1991 to 1994. He left comics in the mid-90s to concentrate on fiction writing. He also wrote a number of essays and articles for Playboy’s online website before establishing his own weekly self-distributed column, “Finn's Wake.”

Finn worked for Chessex Manufacturing for a year, serving as their editor-in-chief, where he worked on a number of product lines including Lost Worlds, Sherlock Holmes, Consulting Detective, and helped design a variety of ancillary game product tie-ins for Vampire: the Masquerade, Call of Cthulhu, Chessex's Speckled Dice line, and others.

Finn returned to Texas in the late 1990s and formed Clockwork Storybook with fellow writers Chris Roberson, Matthew Sturges, and Bill Willingham. Their monthly shared world anthology of urban fantasy centered on the fictitious city of San Cibola, California, and the magical inhabitants that lived side-by-side with the normal citizens. From this collective, Finn published the novels Gods New & Used and Year of the Hare, the first collection of stories revolving around Sam Bowen. Finn later became a contributing editor for RevolutionSF.com and wrote a number of articles and reviews to the website.

Finn served as the creative director for the Violet Crown Radio Players, an audio theater troupe based in Austin, Texas, from 2002 to 2007. He has written several original scripts to critical acclaim and also adapted novels and short stories to an old time radio format, most notably “The Adventures of Sailor Steve Costigan”, and “King Kong”, which was nominated for a B. Iden Payne award.

He has been active in Robert E. Howard studies since 2002 and is now considered to be a scholar in the field. His biography of Howard, Blood & Thunder: The Life & Art of Robert E. Howard (Monkeybrain, Inc.), was released in November 2006 at the World Fantasy Convention and was a finalist for the 2007 Locus Awards for Best Non-Fiction. For his work on Blood & Thunder, Finn was nominated for the 2007 World Fantasy Award in the Special Award Professional category. Finn won the 2005 Cimmerian Awards for Outstanding Achievement, Best Essay (for “Fists of Robert E. Howard” from The Barbaric Triumph), and the Emerging Scholar plus the 2007 Awards for Outstanding Achievement, Book By A Single Author (for Blood & Thunder) and Outstanding Achievement, Website (along with Leo Grin, Rob Roehm and Steve Tompkins for The Cimmerian blog).

In 2013, 2014 and 2016 Finn was named one of the top movie critics in Texas by the Texas Associated Press Managing Editors awards.

Finn is a founding member of the Gentlemen Nerds podcast.

== Partial bibliography ==
1. "Hemingway With a Dick" - RevolutionSF, 2001
2. Gods New & Used - Clockwork Storybook, 2001 (ISBN 0-9704841-1-9)
3. Year of the Hare - Clockwork Storybook, 2002 (ISBN 0-9704841-5-1)
4. "Diary of a Dinopunk" - RevolutionSF, December 2002
5. "The Transformation of Lawrence Croft" - RevolutionSF, (serialized) 2003
6. "Fists of Robert E. Howard" (essay) - The Barbaric Triumph, Wildside Press, 2004 (ISBN 0-8095156-7-9)
7. “Bare Knuckles & Bulldogs”, (intro) - Waterfront Fists: The Complete Fight Stories of Robert E. Howard, Wildside Press, 2004. (ISBN 0-809511-24-X)
8. "Something About Harry" - Projections: Science Fiction in Literature and Film, Monkeybrain, Inc., 2004 (ISBN 1-932265-12-0)
9. "Robert E. Howard" (an interview with Rusty Burke) - Conversations with Texas Writers, - University of Texas Press, 2005. (ISBN 0-292-70614-6)
10. "Robert E. Howard: Lone Star Fantasist" - Conan: The Frost-Giant's Daughter and Other Stories, Dark Horse Books, 2005 (ISBN 1-59307-301-1)
11. "The Chronicler of Conan: Robert E. Howard On His Most Famous Creation" - Conan: The God In the Bowl and Other Stories, Dark Horse Books, 2005 (ISBN 1-59307-403-4)
12. "The Bridge of Teeth" - Adventure, Volume 1, Monkeybrain, Inc., 2005 (honorable mention in Gardner Dozois’ Year's Best Science Fiction) (ISBN 1-932265-13-9)
13. “A Whim of Circumstance” - Cross Plains Universe: Texans Celebrate Robert E. Howard, Monkeybrain, Inc., 2006 (ISBN 1932265-22-8)
14. Blood & Thunder: The Life & Art of Robert E. Howard 2nd edition, The Robert E. Howard Foundation Press., 2014 (ISBN 978-1304031525)
15. “The Transformation of Lawrence Croft: The Con-Dorks Saga Volume 1”, Monkeyhouse Publishing, 2014 (ISBN 978-1499339048)
16. “The Chance of a Lifetime: The Con-Dorks Saga Volume 2”, Monkeyhouse Publishing, 2014 (ISBN 978-1503069947)
17. “Road Trip”, Monkeyhouse Publishing, 2014 (ISBN 978-1497514317)
18. “Year of the Hare: The Sam Bowen Chronicles Volume 1”, Monkeyhouse Publishing, 2014 (ISBN 978-1500802233)
19. “The Adventures of Sailor Tom Sharkey”, Fight Card Publishing, 2014 (ISBN 978-1499379129)
20. “Bowen's Bluff: The Sam Bowen Chronicles Volume 2”, Monkeyhouse Publishing, 2015 (ISBN 978-1507632079)
21. “One in a Million: The Con-Dorks Saga Volume 3”, Monkeyhouse Publishing, 2014 (ISBN 978-1515142539)
22. “Bones of the Rebellion” - Asian Pulp, Pro Se Press, 2015 (ISBN 978-1514752180)
23. “Sic Semper Draconis” - HEROIKA 1: Dragon Eaters, Perseid Press, 2015 (ISBN 978-1514752180)
24. “Shabby Chic” - Debris & Detritus: The Lesser Greek Gods Running Amok, Story Spring Press, 2017 (ISBN 978-1940699141)
