= Homelands (Fables) =

The Homelands are the mythical lands from fairy tales, folklore, and nursery rhymes in the comic book series Fables. The majority of those listed have been conquered by the mysterious Adversary, as he has conquered most of the European Fable lands. This is a list of the Homelands that have been directly referenced in Fables and its spin-offs Jack of Fables, Cinderella: From Fabletown with Love, Cinderella: Fables are Forever and Fairest.

== Major lands ==
- Toscane – also known as the Imperial Homeworld, this world is Italian in nature, which can be seen in the Roman styles of architecture of Calabri Anagni, the capital city of the Empire. This world is home to several Italian Fables: The Adversary and the characters from the tale of Pinocchio. It was formerly the home Sacred grove, now located in the Kingdom of Haven. When translated into Latin, Calabri refers to the Boot heel-shaped peninsula in Italy and Anagni refers to the ancient town in central Italy.
- The Kingdom of the Great Lion – a reference to Narnia, it was another land that was conquered early on. Due to the Chronicles of Narnia currently being protected by copyright, the kingdom may never be officially named. The first chapter of "War And Pieces" is called "The Voyage Of The Sky Treader", which may be a reference to The Voyage Of The Dawn Treader (the 5th book in the "Narnia" series, using the internal chronology). In Fables #137 (Camelot, Part Six), Winter refers to a book her mother reads to her and her siblings all the time, about a land where there is always winter, but never Christmas; this is a reference to The Lion, the Witch and the Wardrobe.
- Lilliput – from Gulliver's Travels, it is unknown if the island of Lilliput is conquered by the Adversary, but the first party that came from Lilliput is now living in Smalltown of Fabletown's upstate Farm annex.
- Bornegascar and Madagao – from Fantastic Fables by Ambrose Bierce, the rival kings managed to escape and died side by side in The Last Castle.
- The Kingdom of the North Wind – also referred to as "the North", the lands of the North Wind were not taken, as the Adversary's minions "knew to leave him alone". Foggytown is located in the Kingdom of the North Wind.
- The Rus – a mythical version of Russia and home to many Slavic Fables. Baba Yaga, the mice and the cat from the Russian lubok The Mice are burying the Cat, and Ivan Durak, all came from this world. It was controlled by Baba Yaga, until she was captured in the Battle of Fabletown. Her Knights also patrolled the lands until they were beheaded by Boy Blue. Prose Page spent years in the Rus during her quest for knowledge in the Homelands. Mundane Russia is approximately one-sixteenth the size of the magical Rus.
- Dunhill, Viss, Haven, and Lamien – the home of Lumi, the Snow Queen. These were not conquered, as Lumi made a deal in which she would use her powers in the Adversary's service, if he would spare her world.
- The Arabian Homeworld – the Arabic Fable Homeworld, it is a primary Islamic world host to places such as Ali Baba's Cave, mythical versions of Baghdad and Samarcand and Fabletown East. Flying carpets, Manticores and Ghouls can also be found in this world. A gate to this world is found in modern-day Baghdad, leading to its fabled version. Solomon's plan of trapping Djinns in wish-granting bottles was initiated here. Sinbad, Yusuf, Hakim and the Three Harem girls, Sidi-Nouman, King Shahryar, Scheherazade, Aladdin and Ali Baba all came from this world.
- The Cloud Kingdoms – from Jack and the Beanstalk, the Cloud Kingdoms exist in their own interdimensional way, being a world of their own but at the same time existing over all of the other worlds.
- Thrumbly Warrens – a land inhabited by talking rabbits and inspired by Watership Down, these were shown as being taken in 1001 Nights of Snowfall.
- The Indu – a fabled version of India, and home to Mowgli, Shere Khan, Bagheera, Baloo and others from The Jungle Book. As the last remaining member of the Raj, the current Viceroy is Lord Mountbatten, a Clockwork Tiger crafted as a gift to Lord Viceroy Lovejoy by the craftsmen of Maharaja Sindu Baba Singh. The Indu might not be the home to Fables of Indian origin but rather those who are born from the British view on India, thus explaining why it was conquered alongside the European worlds instead of the Oriental worlds.
- The Golden Realm – also known as The West, it was ruled by the King to the West, the father of the prince from the fairy tale Snow White and Rose Red. The Golden Realm borders on the Silver Realm and The North. The Magical Forest from Snow White and Rose Red and Snow White and the Seven Dwarves lies in between all three realms.
- The Silver Realm – also known as The East, from Snow White and the Seven Dwarves, it was ruled by the Evil Queen after her husband, the King to the East, died.
- The North – the Lands of Prince Charming, ruled by his father, the King to the North. Prince Charming's lands were confirmed as taken in the Legends in Exile story arc. Whether or not the Adversary conquered the Dwarf Kingdom underneath is unknown, but no dwarves seem to be living in Fabletown, The Farm or even The Golden Boughs Retirement Village. Furthermore, Dwarf Kingdom was not even mentioned during war preparations.
- Landfall – a science fiction-like world with advanced technology and space travel. Apparently, Landfall was not conquered by the Adversary. "Jack Frost Two" spent time there during his career as a hero-for hire. The capital city is also called Landfall.
- The Hesse are the German Fable lands. The name Hesse is derived from one of the larger states in Germany. The Hesse is host to the Black Forest, the city of Hamelin, the town of Winsen and the Weser River. Much of the novel Peter and Max is set in Hesse, and Dunster Happ spent seven years in the Hesse trapping the last of the Baleful Hernes (presumably a reference to Herne the Hunter and Wild Hunt).
- Erin – the mythical version of Ireland, the name Erin is derived from the Irish name for Ireland “Éirinn".
- Albion – the Homelands version of England, it is the home to many English Fables as the name derives from the eldest known name for the United Kingdom.
- Ultima Thule – seen in the mini-series Cinderella: From Fabletown with Love, Thule is a Fable homeworld that mainly draws its characters from Norwegian Folktales. Humans and trolls live side by side with sentient moose, foxes and polar bears. Thule was governed before, during and after the Adversary conquered it by King Valemon and his bride until they were overthrown by its current ruler, Cinderella's Fairy Godmother. Night lasts for six months in Ultima Thule.
- Oz – also known as the Emerald Kingdom, from the classic Wizard of Oz series by L. Frank Baum, it and surrounding kingdoms are controlled by the Nome King. The Scarecrow, Tin Man, Lion, and Dorothy were imprisoned at the Golden Boughs Retirement Village until Jack Horner helped them escape. Princess Ozma escaped and is currently a member of Fabletown's coven of magicians, witches and sorcerers. It is revealed that a road is being constructed through the Deadly Desert linking Oz properly to surrounding lands and kingdoms. The Emerald City appears in the story arc Inherit the Wind.
- The Land of Ev: Bufkin ends up here after climbing the Fabletown Business Office's tree. Ev, like Oz, was conquered by the former Adversary, and is now ruled by the Nome King as part of his Pan-Ozian Empire. While sitting in one of Ev's native Lunch Box Trees, Bufkin accidentally saves Bungle the Glass Cat, Jack Pumpkinhead and The Sawhorse from a couple of "Rumbe Tumble Toms".
- The Lands of the West are ruled by the West Wind.
- Far Mattagonia – also known as Toyland, Madland and the Wondrous Shore, it is a land of discarded toys, the Discardia. Because the land is inhabited by toys from the mundane world, it is possible that Toyland is not actually part of the Homelands, but part of another, alternate reality.
- The Hidden Kingdom – the homelands version of Japan, the people of The Hidden Kingdom lived side by side with creatures from Japanese mythology, including the funa yurei, kappas, the legendary tanuki, kitsune, kirin and assorted yokai. It was ruled by an Emperor, who is referred to as Heika, a term used to identify the emperor in Japanese. The Hidden Kingdom was conquered by the Adversary after the Seii Taishogun was secretly laying the way for an invasion. Many of the kingdom's citizens are living in exile in a secret Fable community in Tokyo.
- The Roman Empire: While searching for her lost children, Rapunzel witnessed the birth of an empire, when she found a she-wolf suckling the infant Romulus and Remus.
- The Kingdom of a Thousand Hills is a homeworld of African origin, one of the many worlds that Rapunzel visited while searching for her lost children.
- Wonderland, Looking-Glass Land and Snark Island – from Lewis Carroll's Alice in Wonderland and Through the Looking-Glass, it is never shown or referred to, except for a vague reference to Looking-Glass Land in the "who's who" in the Jack of Fables trade paperback Jack of Hearts, which refers to Alice as "a survivor of several adventures through a looking-glass, including a meal of questionable mushrooms". These lands are assumed to have been conquered since numerous playing cards and the Cheshire Cat are residents of Fabletown. Alice, the Mad Hatter, the Dormouse and the March Hare, the Walrus and the Carpenter (and the oysters they seem not to have eaten yet) were held prisoner at the Golden Boughs Retirement Village. Humpty Dumpty is also a prisoner and a violet/pink caterpillar (which may or may not be the Caterpillar) is shown eating a leaf while Humpty Dumpty tries to convince Jack Horner to let him escape with the others. The Vorpal Sword is now Fabletown property, and has been referred to as the Jabberwock's bane. This could imply that Tulgey Wood has been conquered as well.

== Places ==
- Keep at the End of the World – from East of the Sun and West of the Moon, this was the setting for The Last Castle, where the last Fable refugees escaped from to the Mundy world.
- The Black Forest – located in the Hesse and former home to Bigby Wolf, Frau Totenkinder and a whole array of malign spirits, ogres and bogeymen, it is not known whether the Forest itself was taken over by the Empire, because the Hessians themselves do not dare to enter it. The rest of the Hesse, on the contrary, was indeed conquered. In Peter & Max: A Fables Novel, it is revealed that the Adversary's troops did enter the Black Forests on numerous occasions (to try to hunt The Big Bad Wolf, as well as to travel to Hamelin).
- Camelot appears in flashbacks in the story arc The Good Prince. According to the ghost of Sir Lancelot, the legend of Camelot and its fabled King Arthur set the standard of "true chivalry" for all of christendom and its legend touched much of the pagan worlds beyond. Lancelot's betrayal would eventually lead to Camelot's downfall.
- The Kingdom of Haven – the home of Flycatcher, they were shown being taken in 1001 Nights of Snowfall. Recently, he has returned there with his new army of ghosts and has set it up as a place of refuge for anyone wishing to escape the Adversary's control. He has become a consistent thorn in the Adversary's side, having defeated much of the Adversary's forces, including turning all of the Empire's wooden soldiers into a new enchanted grove, taking out the Empire's best fighters.
- The Lands of The Beauty and the Beast are assumed to be taken because Beast refers to their lands as "forever lost in the Homelands", in the Legends in Exile story arc.
- The Lands of Old King Cole were shown being taken in 1001 Nights of Snowfall.
- The Lands of King Noble – from the Reynard stories, these were shown as captured in 1001 Nights of Snowfall. Reynard helped most of the animals escape the invading forces.
- Nottingham – directly mentioned as being captured in The Last Castle, it was Robin Hood's home.
- Colchester: Humpty Dumpty from Jack of Fables was a cannon for the Homelands version of the Siege of Colchester.
- Toad Hall – from The Wind in the Willows, it is directly mentioned as being taken in 1001 Nights of Snowfall. Badger, Toad and Mole all escaped, and many assume Stinky the Badger on the Farm is in fact the same character as Mr. Badger.
- Atlantis: The underwater kingdom of mermaids was shown being conquered in 1001 Nights of Snowfall. The only known survivor is Mersey Dotes, now turned into a mermaid.
- Red City – mentioned by the Snow Queen, Red City Plague originates from this City. Red City Plague might possibly allude to Edgar Allan Poe's Masque of the Red Death.
- Bald Mountain – from Modest Mussorgsky's play and directly mentioned in Jack of Fables, it is home to Chernobog, one of the Devils Jack made a deal with to prolong his life.
- Rome is the Fabled version of the capital of Italy. Incitatus was a member of its senate.
- The lands of the "civilized apes" appear in flashbacks in the Jack of Fables story Jack 'n' Apes. These lands were conquered by the Adversary's forces.
- The Hundred Acre Wood – in the Jack of Fables story Jack 'n' Apes, a character looking remarkably similar to Winnie the Pooh (but drawn slightly differently, as Winnie the Pooh was under copyright at the time) can be seen in flashbacks from the Homelands, barbecuing marshmallows with the sock monkey Saunders in what appears to be the Hundred Acre Wood. They were described as living in "blissful simplicity". In the works of author A. A. Milne, Sanders is the name of the person who resided at Pooh's home prior to Pooh making it his house, and Winnie the Pooh and several other characters from the books were based on the stuffed toys of Milne's son. Saunders and his friends were driven from their homes when the Adversary invaded, and Saunders ended up in Africa in the mundane world, along with the rest of the "civilized apes" that Jack Horner claims to have met. Winnie the Pooh and Piglet apparently made it to the Farm. Both make an obscure appearance in Fables: in part five of the Animal Farm story arc, when the foiled revolution threatens to flare up again. Pooh and Piglet appear in two panels, from a distance when Boy Blue tells everyone to move back, and then from behind in the following panel.
- Prospero's Island is the setting of William Shakespeare's the Tempest and is located in the Homelands version of the Mediterranean Sea. Prospero and Sycorax are members of Fabletown's 13th Floor of magicians and spellcasters.
- The Great Wiggly River is the river in the fable of The Scorpion and the Frog. It is mentioned by Ollikandar Strikeswift, brother of the scorpion in the story, during Mr. Brump the Goblin's trial.
- Harvest Town is the town where "the Janky Man" was boxed away.
- Sarukan: "Jack Frost Two" was involved in an incident there while working as a hero-for hire.
- The Shifting Worlds: Jack Frost Two spent time there while working as a hero-for hire.
- The Winterlace Floating Worlds – Jack Frost Two was involved in an incident there, which ended in a fiasco.
- Balthador's Gate: Jack Frost Two was involved in an incident there while working as a hero-for hire.
- Planet Seventy-Two is a home of the "march wyrm".
- Kansas – referred to in Cinderella: Fables Are Forever, it is the former home of Dorothy Gale. Kansas is presumably located in Americana, the Fable version of America.
- The Great Wall is referred to in Cinderella: Fables Are Forever.
- The Homeland of the North is the North Wind's realm of elemental ice and wind. Not many people can get there, as few know where it is or are able to survive the journey.
- Avon Valley is referred to in the story In Those Days.
- Seppantyre is the city that Briar Rose is from, located in a "bright and beautiful" land.
- The Twilight Lands are inhabited by the fairy godmothers from the tale of Sleeping Beauty, as well as Hadeon the Destroyer, the evil fairy, who ruled the realm's darkest corners.
- The Silver Pool is a place where a knight, if he is noble and chaste, can be healed of any injury.
- Kreese is inhabited by a six-headed lion.
- The Deep Night Hollow is a place where every nightmare is caged and tamed.
- The Forest of Ghosts holds the key to unlock the "seven secrets of the Silent Mountain".
- The Silent Mountain is the mountain of the "seven secrets".
- The Forest of Dire Blight is the place where Hadeon the Destroyer dwelled.
- Morencaire is referred to in the Fairest story arc Wide Awake.
- The Edge of the World – from the archaic model of the Flat Earth, Rapunzel once sailed off the Edge of the World, and washed up on the shores of the Hidden Kingdom.
- The Labyrinth comes from the tale of the Minotaur. During Rapunzel's quest for her lost daughters, she entered the labyrinth and slew the Minotaur.
- The Floating Cities of Dabb: Bufkin liberated the slaves there during his many adventures.
- Karth is referred to in the Camelot story arc.
- The North Pole is the real version, where Santa Claus lives.

== Minor lands ==
- Boxen – the land invented by C.S. Lewis and his brother Warren when they were children, as described in his memoir Surprised by Joy.
- Ruby Lake
- Oakcourt
- Hollyfield
- Oak Hollows – this place had the gateway that John Barleycorn and Arrow came through.
- Skold – minor land that is a link between Kardan and the Rus. This is where Boy Blue fought and killed a dragon.
- Vesteri
- Kardan – minor land linked to Skold.
- Karse – possibly the Karse from Exile's Honor.
- Skribnutch
- Ynnes
- Kurrewyn
- Tiabrut – this is the world where Mr. Dark was imprisoned.
- Levant – Prose Page spent years there during her quest for knowledge in the Homelands.
- Alexandria – Prose Page spent a decade there studying.
- Aldara Quoor
- Onyx
- Stellarholm
- Antrigonet
- Aragon – a mythical version of Spain, with "Aragon" being the name of a region of northeastern Spain.
- Fryslân – a mythical version of the Netherlands, with "Fryslân" being the official and Frisian name for Friesland, a coastal province of northern Netherlands.
- Bilbao – the mythical Basque Country, a region in northern Spain, with "Bilbao" referring to its capital.
- Bretagne – a mythical version of Brittany, a region of France: "la Bretagne" is French for "Brittany".
- Gascogne – a mythical version of Gascony, a historical region of France: "Gascogne" is the French name for Gascony.
- Septimanie – a mythical version of Septimania, an ancient territory in what is now southwestern France, with "Septamanie" being the French name of Septimania.
- Bourgogne – a mythical version of Burgundy, a historical region of France: "la Bourgogne" is French for "Burgundy".
- Aquitaine – a mythical version of Aquitaine, a (now former) region of southwestern France.
- Kärnten – a mythical version of Austria, with "Kärnten" being the German name for Carinthia, a federal state of southern Austria.
- Lotharin – a mythical version of Lorraine, a historical region corresponding to present-day northeastern France: the name "Lotharin" is derived from Lotharingia, an alternate name for Lorraine.
- Scanda – the land of which Prince Lindworm is ruler of.
- Westermark – the land that Mister Kadabra was a lord of.
- Silene – the homeworld of Saint George.
- Lemuria
- Cannondale – the place where Mr. Brump the goblin is from.
- Eastermouse – the place where Mr. Brump is also from.
- Dunhollow – the homeland of Lady Maeve.
- Hybernia – a tiny Fable homeland, invaded by Baobhan sith and the Cu sith from Scottish mythology.

The Homelands version of China is referred to, but not named, in Cinderella: Fables Are Forever, which refers to the empire from the Chinese folktale about Meng Chiang-Nu.

== Americana ==
Another land of interest is Americana, the Fable version of America, appearing mainly in the Jack of Fables series.

Large areas in Americana include:

- The Colonies – the states of New England.
- Antebellum – the South.
- Lone Star – the state of Texas.
- Steamboat – the Mississippi River area.
- Gangland – the Chicago area during the 1920s.
- The Frontier – covering Kansas, Nebraska, and the Dakotas.
- Idyll – the Appalachian Mountains area during the 1950s.
- The West – covering the Rocky Mountains area.
- The Great White North – Canada and The Arctic.

Significant places in Americana are Big City and Salem located in the Colonies, Steamboat City located in Steamboat, Speakeasy located in Gangland, the Grand Canyon created by Paul Bunyan and unnamed cities in Lone Star, The Frontier and the Great White North. Kansas is referred to in Cinderella: Fables Are Forever and was the former home of Dorothy Gale.

As could be expected from the Homelands, things are not so normal as they should be. The Idyll area seems to be populated entirely by zombies, all being loyal to the Bookburner (who is the head librarian of Americana, the library being located in Idyll), while the Great White North seems to represent how America views Canada and Alaska, as it is very clean, ice hockey being the biggest form of amusement and, according to Jack, having horrible bacon.

Untouched by The Adversary's forces, Americana possesses advanced technology compared with the conquered European worlds where the absence of modern arms is crucial to sustain the ruling system. Vehicles and appliances seen are cars from the 1920s, steam trains, various firearms and even modern household appliances. Besides, the only known way to enter Americana is by dressing as a vagrant and jumping on a train.

It is also quite possible that other areas are near or on Americana that resemble ancient Mesoamerica or Latin America.
