= Jack of Fables =

Spin-off comic book series

- Cover to issue #1 of Jack of Fables (September 2006), art by James Jean.

Publication information
- Publisher: Vertigo Comics
- Schedule: Monthly
- Format: Ongoing series
- Publication date: July 2006 – March 2011
- No. of issues: 50
- Main character(s): Jack Horner "Gary" the Pathetic Fallacy; Jack Frost

Creative team
- Created by: Bill Willingham; Lilah Sturges
- Written by: Bill Willingham and Lilah Sturges
- Artist(s): Tony Akins; Andrew Pepoy; James Jean; Brian Bolland

Collected editions
- The (Nearly) Great Escape: ISBN 1-4012-1222-0
- Jack of Hearts: ISBN 1-4012-1455-X
- The Bad Prince: ISBN 1-4012-1854-7
- Americana: ISBN 1-4012-1979-9
- Turning Pages: ISBN 1-4012-2138-6
- The Big Book of War: ISBN 1-4012-2500-4
- The New Adventures of Jack and Jack: ISBN 1-4012-2712-0
- The Fulminate Blade: ISBN 1-4012-2982-4
- The End: ISBN 1-4012-3155-1

Jack of Fables is a spin-off comic book series of Fables written by Bill Willingham and Lilah Sturges and published by DC Comics' Vertigo imprint. The story focuses on the adventures of Jack Horner, a supporting character in the main series, that takes place after his exile from Fabletown in the story-arc Jack Be Nimble. The idea for the spin-off comic came after editor Shelly Bond suggested to put Jack in a separate comic when Willingham planned to write him out of the series.

While Jack of Fables focused on the eponymous Jack Horner, the spin-off also allowed Willingham and Sturges to expand upon the Fables universe by adding new characters, settings, and anthropomorphic personifications of philosophical and literary ideas in the series. A preview of its first issue was shown in Fables #50, and the series itself debuted in July 2006. It ran for 50 issues from July 2006 to March 2011, and received positive reception from critics and fans alike during its release, though over time would be criticized because of the main character's abhorrent sociopathy. In 2007, it was nominated for numerous Eisner Awards and won Best Lettering for Todd Klein and Best Cover Artist for James Jean. The series has since been collected in both trade paperback and deluxe edition hardcovers.

== Publication ==
The decision to remove the character of Jack Horner from the series came when artist Mark Buckingham proposed to expand the Fables' logic of "popularity equals power", which stated that fairy tale characters were only as strong as their popularity in the real mundane world. He and Willingham decided to use Jack in showing how a Fable might use this theory to further his/her own gain. This led to the two-part story arc entitled Jack Be Nimble where Jack created an action film trilogy of himself that elevated his popularity with the Mundies, which in turn also increased his powers. This story arc was supposed to be the last time Jack Horner would appear in Fables, and Willingham initially wanted to write him off the series, but editor Shelly Bond suggested that Horner be put in a separate comic instead, stating that she did this because she did not want to lose her "favorite" character in the series. Jack of Fables was first previewed in Fables #50 before finally being released in July 2006. With the new series in publication, Willingham decided to use Jack of Fables in introducing other literary characters in the Fables mythos and to expand its universe to include the Old West and the Folklore of the United States. The new series also gave Willingham and Sturges more freedom in writing its universe than in the main series.

Jack of Fables was the first project that Sturges worked upon in the mainstream comic book industry. Bond and Willingham originally chose Lilah Sturges to act as a second voice on the new series, and Willingham himself had previously known Sturges during their founding of the independent publishing label Clockwork Storybook. Sturges remarked that in writing Jack of Fables, she found herself putting the character in more and more positions she found amusing. Others who worked on the main Fables series also worked on the spin-off, including long-time Fables inker Steve Leialoha who served as penciller and inker in two issues. Artists Tony Akins, Andrew Pepoy, Todd Klein, Russell Braun, Andrew Robinson, and Brian Bolland also worked on the series. Todd Klein, in particular, was chosen to add humor in the story, and Sturges praised him for his work in doing so while avoiding a "cartoony" feel. In writing the story, Willingham and Sturges both made sure to keep the spin-off independent and not overlap too much with the main series, which Willingham felt would have made it a "Fables Jr. kind of book".

== Plot ==
=== Jack Horner ===
Like in Fables, the series took place in the contemporary world albeit with characters from fairy tales and folklore living alongside normal humans in secret, known as Fables. The story followed one such popular Fable named Jack Horner who was known from stories such as Little Jack Horner, Jack and the Beanstalk, Jack and Jill, Jack Be Nimble, Jack Frost, Jack O'Lantern, Jack the Giant Killer and others. Before the start of the story, Jack stole some money from Fabletown in order to create a film trilogy and make a name for himself in Hollywood. The Fables soon found out about his deed and they sent out the town sheriff Beast to apprehend him for his crime. To Jack's dismay, Beast managed to find him in Hollywood, confiscated all the money and properties he had built, and was told that he could never set foot on Fabletown again. The series then started off after Jack left Hollywood.

While hitchhiking, Jack was captured by an armed group of magical creatures calling themselves Literals. They imprisoned him in a place called the Golden Boughs Retirement Village, a magical community owned by Mr. Revise where Fables are trapped, censored, and lose all their powers. Although incarcerated in the village, Jack managed to rally up all the other imprisoned Fables to help him escape. Afterwards, he befriended a Literal named Gary the Pathetic Fallacy and together they became entangled in more adventures. Jack's adventures consisted of him getting married in Las Vegas and fighting a Fable mob leader named Lady Luck, getting stabbed by the Excalibur in the chest and finding out that he was just a copy of another Fable named Wicked John, heading out into Americana to find lost treasures with Humpty Dumpty, and returning to the Golden Boughs just in time to lead them in a fight against a powerful Literal named Bookburner. After successfully defeating Bookburner, Jack and Gary then promptly left the Golden Bough to finally enjoy their new found treasure, but the treasure they had hoarded had a drastic effect on the two, with Jack himself losing his immortality, before beginning to age and bloat. Gary theorized that these were probably brought by the spin-off's artist taking revenge on Horner due to his previous remarks about him. After taking refuge in a cave to stash their treasure, Jack was then transformed into a dragon (similar to Fafnir) and forced to stay in that form until a hero comes and slays him.

=== Jack Frost ===
The story then shifted to Jack's son Jack Frost II, who was born from his brief romance with the Snow Queen before the events of the overall series. After learning of his mother's apparent disappearance, Frost, who'd been locked up in her castle since birth, finally left and set out on his own adventure. He let go of his winter powers that he inherited from his mother, and travelled into the Homelands to become the legendary hero he had always dreamed off. His first battle as a hero was against a group of scavengers he came across in the capital city. Though he found difficulty fighting without his powers, he nonetheless killed them all with the help of a mechanical owl, whom he named MacDuff. His next adventure came when a girl hired him to save her kingdom from monsters they called Night Walkers. Jack was soon trapped and captured by these monsters. He also discovered that they too were being tormented, this time by a powerful sorcerer who ruled both the lands of the monsters and the humans they were preying. He agreed to save the Night Walkers from the sorcerer, but in return they must also learn to coexist with the humans in peace. Jack then tracked down the sorcerer in his own castle, killed him, and finally freed the two races. This victory turned him into a well-known hero in the Homelands. He and MacDuff would continue their adventures, making new allies and lovers, discovering new weapons, and battling other monsters from both fantasy and science fiction.

=== Finale ===
After becoming the legendary hero he always wanted, Jack Frost decided that his final quest before retiring was defeating a ferocious dragon, rumored to be hiding inside a cave filled with treasure, which he did not know was actually his own father, Jack Horner. Horner himself had a premonition that he and Gary would be defending their treasure to the death from intruders, who would turn out to be minor characters that had appeared in the series. Frost successfully tracked Jack down, alongside other supporting characters who also ended up in the same location. Both Jacks then fought a bloody duel that eventually killed the two as well as those who were present. After Jack Horner died, the devils that he tricked in his Jack O' Lantern days finally came to collect his soul. All of them ended up bickering to which of them could claim it, and this gave Jack the opportunity to slip away and escape.

The small story arc from the main series entitled The Very Last Jack Of Fables Story Of All Time revealed the fate of Jack and Gary after their apparent demise. The devils did recapture Jack and they all agreed to put him in an empty planet alone to write down all of his sins and repent. While locked away, Jack discovered that he actually had a tiny portion of reality-bending powers because of his half-literal nature, which he then used to resurrect Gary and restore his powers. With Gary's powers, Jack invented his own new universe where "he is king, tacos are grown in trees, everyone has a pet dinosaur, and every woman is buxom and in heat all the time". Both friends successfully created this universe and finally get to spend their eternity in luxury.

== Theme and style ==
A panel in Jack of Fables #33 showing the characters in the series, including both the Fables and the Literals.

Unlike Fables which was written as a mature comic with serious human drama and a gritty tone, Jack of Fables was written as a comedy story with slapstick, violence, and fourth wall breaking. Josh Flanagan of IFanboy remarked that it pokes fun on the serious premise of Fables by being a "bit sillier" and having a less-serious tone than the main series. Lilah Sturges actually wrote the story with focus on putting the character Jack Horner into an ever-increasing number of mishaps and troubles as the series went on. To top it all of, Willingham and Sturges decided to kill off all of the characters in the series by the last story arc, as a sort of a final humor that was known in Jack of Fables. They originally wanted to end the series abruptly in order to prank its readers but the idea was rejected by DC editors.

The spin-off series also gave Bill Willingham more freedom in expanding the series' universe. At one point, the editors became concerned when Bill Willingham added the character of Sam from the controversial book Little Black Sambo, but he pushed on with the character in order to explore and add more concepts in the overall series. Jack of Fables further introduced other locations, ideas, and Fables into the main series, such as the Golden Boughs Retirement Village, a prominent location where Fables are locked away so they disappear from public consciousness and thus lose power. The place was named after Sir James George Frazer's The Golden Bough, a wide-ranging comparative study of mythology and religion. Americana is the American Fable-land from which characters such as Paul Bunyan, Natty Bumppo, and Huckleberry Finn came from. These locations are controlled by a number of Literals who were written off as physical embodiment of literary ideals and genre. Examples of these characters include Mr. Revise who is the embodiment of censorship and revision, his brother Bookburner who is the personification of book burning, their father Gary the Pathetic Fallacy who is the personification of anthropomorphic non-living objects, Dex the Deus Ex Machina, Kevin Thorne who is the embodiment of creative writing and his archenemy Writer's Block. There were also personifications of genres, such as comedy, horror, westerns, science fiction, fantasy and others. These characters are separate beings from the Fables whom they interact with authority.

== Critical reception ==
After the release of its first issue, Jack of Fables was received positively by critics and fans alike. While not attaining the same large sales as its parent Fables, Willingham described the series as a "pretty strong" seller. It was nominated for an Eisner Award in Best New Series and Best Writer for Bill Willingham in 2007. The creative team behind the spin-off series also took home Eisner Awards in two different categories: Todd Klein in Best Lettering and James Jean in Best Cover Artist. Time magazine's Lev Grossman named it as one of the Top 10 Graphic Novels of 2007, ranking it at #5. Brian Cronin from Comic Book Resources listed Jack of Fables as #5 in its "Top 5 Current Vertigo Ongoings", calling it Fables II and how "Bill Willingham [did] a nice job of surrounding Jack with as many other intriguing characters as possible".

During an interview with Willingham, Vaneta Rogers from Newsarama praised its four years of "thrilling readers with Jack's ridiculous, wild, and often borderline-offensive acts". Eric Sunde of IGN described the spin-off as either "a cheap cash-in on the Fables name" or "others that seem far more relevant and add to the Fables-verse". He also praised it for having "an identity and cast of its own, and is on a nice, steady upswing" and how it "can continue upwards to the point where it can stand shoulder to shoulder with Fables". Author Matthew Peterson of Major Spoilers gave issue #50 a 4 out of 5 stars, saying "the saddest part of all of this is the knowledge that it's all perfectly correct, giving Jack not only an ending, but the kind of classical old-school ending that Jack deserves, in all senses of the word". He also praised the writers for pulling off a "qualified win" in its last story.

The series also drew negative criticism from comic book reviews, particularly on the main character and his detestable, selfish and sociopathic personality. IGN journalist Jesse Schiedeen praised issue #33 that he described as a "certain sense of fun and whimsy" but was critical of the character Jack, whom he described as an "annoying braggart who did well to get himself booted out of the main series". He also admitted about enjoying issue #33 when it showed Jack being beaten up by Bigby Wolf and finally having what "was coming to him". Richard Eisenbeis of Kotaku commented on how hard it was to root for Jack because of his personality. He also had a mixed review of the spin-off comic, describing its story as fun but not as good as the original series. He compared both Fables and Jack of Fables in his review, and he described the former as a gritty, realistic series focusing on human drama, while the latter was just a "side of slapstick humor with fourth wall-breaking moments and a focus on comedy". Josh Flanagan of IFanboy criticized the story's distinct tone from the main series, which he described as a "fierce counterpoint to how the story eventually end". He nonetheless praised it for its fun and interesting ideas about fiction, writing, and genres.

The Comet had a more positive reception on the protagonist, stating that "Jack Horner was always a very unlikeable lead, being an arrogant womaniser who would always act in his own self-interest instead of helping others, but that was part of his charm, and it was difficult not to root for him despite his flaws. Removing Horner from his own title for a sustained length of time was a creative gamble by writers Bill Willingham and Matthew Sturges, but that was part of their overall game-plan for the series".

== Collected editions ==
=== Trade paperbacks ===
#	Title	ISBN	Release date	Collected material
1	Jack of Fables - The (Nearly) Great Escape	1-4012-1222-0	February 28, 2007	Jack of Fables #1–5
2	Jack of Fables - Jack of Hearts	1-4012-1455-X	October 3, 2007	Jack of Fables #6–11
3	Jack of Fables - The Bad Prince	1-4012-1854-7	June 25, 2008	Jack of Fables #12–16
4	Jack of Fables - Americana	1-4012-1979-9	December 16, 2008	Jack of Fables #17–21
5	Jack of Fables - Turning Pages	1-4012-2138-6	March 10, 2009	Jack of Fables #22–27
6	Jack of Fables - The Big Book of War	1-4012-2500-4	October 7, 2009	Jack of Fables #28–32
13	Fables: The Great Fables Crossover	1-4012-2572-1	February 9, 2010	Fables #83–85, Jack of Fables #33–35 and The Literals #1–3
7	Jack of Fables - The New Adventures of Jack and Jack	1-4012-2712-0	June 23, 2010	Jack of Fables #36–40
8	Jack of Fables - The Fulminate Blade	1-4012-2982-4	January 26, 2011	Jack of Fables #41–45
9	Jack of Fables - The End	1-4012-3155-1	July 13, 2011	Jack of Fables #46–50

=== Deluxe Editions ===
#	Title	ISBN	Release date	Collected material
1	Jack of Fables Deluxe Edition Book One	1-4012-6463-8	April 4, 2017	Jack of Fables #1–16
2	Jack of Fables Deluxe Edition Book Two	1-4012-7771-3	March 6, 2018	Jack of Fables #17–32
10	Fables Deluxe Edition Volume 10	1-4012-5521-3	May 19, 2015	Jack of Fables #33–35, Fables #83–85, The Literals #1–3 and Fables: Werewolves of the Heartland
3	Jack of Fables Deluxe Edition Book Three	1-4012-9579-7	March 10, 2020	Jack of Fables #36–50

== In other media ==
- Jack Horner's appearance in the video game The Wolf Among Us is based around his characterization in the spin-off series.
- Jack Horner has been mentioned, and even became the subject, of various literature such as Shelly Bond's Vertigo's Most Devious and Neta Gordon's A Tour of Fabletown: Patterns and Plots in Bill Willingham's Fables.
