= Geppetto (Fables) =

Publication information
- Publisher: Vertigo Comics
- First appearance: Fables #40 (October 2005)
- Created by: Bill Willingham

In-story information
- Team affiliations: Adversary Empire
- Notable aliases: The Adversary
- Abilities: Master woodcarver, sorcerer, leader of the Empire

Geppetto is a major character, albeit one that's rarely seen, in the comic book series Fables, written by Bill Willingham and published by DC Comics as part of the Vertigo imprint.

His actions are responsible for the entire premise of the comic book, in that he is the being known as The Adversary who masterminded the conquest of the Fable homelands, forcing the Fables to flee into the mundane world. During the war against the Empire, he was the primary antagonist of the series before being given amnesty, having his role replaced by Mister Dark.

In 2009, Geppetto was ranked as IGN's 91st Greatest Comic Book Villain of All Time.

== Fictional character biography ==
=== Beginning ===
Based on the character of Geppetto from the book The Adventures of Pinocchio, Geppetto is the creator of Pinocchio, the wooden boy who was ultimately, after a series of adventures, turned into a human boy by the Blue Fairy. It later transpired that his conversion to human form had not cured Pinocchio of his wanderlust and the boy repeatedly left on adventures, often disappearing for years at a time, leaving Geppetto behind to wait in lonely solitude for his return.

Geppetto's solution seemed obvious, to create new children, initially older sons, operating under the assumption that they would prove more mature than Pinocchio, then turning his hand to daughters. The Blue Fairy continued to visit, and, every now and then, would take a liking to one of the children and turn them human. Having also been hurt by Pinocchio's vagabond nature, she altered her magic to include bonds of loyalty to Geppetto and of fealty to hearth and home.

=== Start of the Empire ===
Life continued in a generally happy fashion until Geppetto was approached by the elders of the local community who were growing increasingly concerned about the erratic behaviour of the local Count. They proposed that he should be replaced; that Geppetto should create a double for the Count, persuade the Blue Fairy to turn him human, then, at some suitable point, replace the Count with his double. Despite initial misgivings, as the plan clearly had to involve the murder of the real Count, the switch was made and sanity settled back into the land. The new Count ruled wisely, but eventually the time came for him to pass away. His son was highly incompetent, so the decision was made to repeat the procedure.

As time passed, the process became habitual, and it wasn't too long before every major ruling official within range had been replaced by one of Geppetto's duplicates, and thus, through the Blue Fairy's magic, all of them were loyal to him. The Fairy, however, was tired of the game, putting Geppetto in a problematic situation. With his co-conspirators hungry to expand the territory that they controlled, the inability to turn the duplicates human was a problem. Geppetto began to research the magic himself; many of the lords under his control had court magicians in their service and were able to send them to Geppetto to instruct him in the ways of magic. Within a short period of time, Geppetto came to understand how the Blue Fairy performed her magic, but he lacked her unique magical nature, which acted as her power source. During her next visit, he solved that problem by attacking her and hooking her up to a system that allowed him to create elixirs from her body that could turn his duplicates human.

=== Becoming Emperor ===
Geppetto now faced up to the problem of his co-conspirators. Too many people knew about what was happening and he felt that it would only be a matter of time before one of them revealed it. Some obligingly died of old age, but others were of Fablekind and refused to age. Acting entirely alone, Geppetto proceeded to kill and replace the remaining conspirators, while also continuing to replace local government officials from the surrounding areas. Without him really realising it, Geppetto's empire was well under way.

Expansion became the key to maintaining his empire, and Geppetto had by now developed a taste for ruling, taking the view that it was better that he should be in charge than someone who might prove to be less benevolent. A new problem had arisen however. His empire had expanded to the extent that the nearby leaders were complete strangers to him, so it would not be possible to surreptitiously replace them. Subterfuge was no longer an option. Fortunately, by this point, Geppetto had control over a considerable military force, through the various lords under his control. Augmented by magically summoned creatures, his armies were able to overwhelm most opposition with some ease, especially since few (if any) expected the attacks. Geppetto also created the figure of the Emperor, a massively imposing figure, heavily armoured, to be his figurehead to inspire martial loyalty and to strike fear into enemy forces.

The empire continued to expand, operating on a fifty-year cycle of expansion and consolidation. Geppetto himself tends to stay out of direct control, allowing his sons and daughters, now numbering in the tens of thousands, to handle the day-to-day running of the empire. Geppetto prefers to remain in his cottage workshop, only occasionally getting involved to set policy and broad goals for the empire.

At the time of the Fables stories, the empire has absorbed all of the European Fable worlds (with a few exceptions, such as the kingdom of the North Wind) and is beginning a new expansion cycle, launching an assault on the Arabian fables.

=== Dealings with Fabletown ===
Geppetto's attitude towards Fabletown was, for the most part, one of general disinterest. With many worlds for his Empire still to absorb, the mundane world was of little interest, and those Fables who had escaped there were of limited interest for the time being, although he did still consider them to be his subjects, albeit in what he considered to be self-imposed exile. He did not, however, intend to allow Fabletown to be a distraction and sent in a unit of his elite wooden soldiers with the aim of reclaiming all those magical items that the escaping Fables had managed to take with them when they fled (although it is implied that this was not the army's only purpose, as they apparently had plans to kill some of the Fables even if Fabletown did not resist). He sent them under the command of Baba Yaga, masquerading as Red Riding Hood, who he announced to the denizens of Fabletown was his Imperial Envoy, who would work to achieve reconciliation between them. Fabletown chose to resist and neither Baba Yaga nor any of the wooden soldiers returned to the Homelands.

His next encounter with Fabletown was the one-man invasion of the Homelands by Boy Blue. Armed with powerful magical artifacts, Blue caused a remarkable amount of disruption, slaying several Imperial governors as he made his way closer to the Imperial capitol, where he infiltrated the Emperor's throne room and killed the Emperor, who reverted to his original wooden form. Captured by the Snow Queen, Blue was brought to Geppetto, and the two conversed for some time, while Geppetto worked on repairing the Emperor puppet ready for returning him to a living form; Blue also returned Pinocchio's body to his grateful father, who had little difficulty in reviving his wayward offspring. Shortly afterwards, it became apparent that Blue had allowed himself to be captured in order to discover the true identity of the Adversary. Escaping with ease, he attempted to kill Geppetto, but failed due to the sheer number of protective spells that surrounded the older Fable. Angrily, Geppetto swore to send the Snow Queen after Blue to get revenge. Disturbed and confused, Pinocchio chose to stay with his father when Blue left.

His anger with Fabletown grew even further after their next encounter. Bigby Wolf infiltrated the Homelands and broke into Geppetto's cottage, where he explained that Fabletown would be adopting what he referred to as the Israel template. Any hurt inflicted on Fabletown would be returned several times over. Bigby then demonstrated this policy by using plastic explosive to destroy the grove of magical trees that Geppetto used to create the wooden soldiers, in retaliation for their assault on Fabletown. The resulting fire also destroyed Geppetto's cottage.

After these events, Geppetto finally decided that Fabletown had to be dealt with, and called a conference of the Imperial elite to discuss possible options. Although the final discussions at the conference had yet to be revealed, he seemed to have decided to wage all-out war on the mundane world, possibly to ultimately use the devastated world as a prison. He dispatched Hansel to Fabletown, ostensibly as an official envoy, but really with the mission of retrieving Baba Yaga and the surviving wooden soldiers and return them to the Homelands. As a result of Pinocchio's report on the likely retaliation from the mundane world, Geppetto decided that all the Fables in the mundane world will have to be assassinated prior to their attack, in order to prevent them from informing the mundane authorities of the source of the invasion and rallying them against the Empire. He ordered the Snow Queen to make the necessary plans and to contact Hansel to impress on him the urgency of his mission. Geppetto intended the attack to take place in three years time.

This all changed when Flycatcher engaged and completed his quest in forming a new kingdom called Haven. The Empire dispatched armies to destroy the newly formed land, but found themselves disabled as the spirits Flycatcher brought with him in the journey overwhelmed them. Making matters worse, the fallen soldiers jumped at Flycatcher's proposition to become citizens of Haven since the alternative would have been to return to the Empire to be killed for failure. Impatient, Geppetto ordered all of his Wooden Soldiers to march into Haven and crush it to the ground, but the magical armor worn by Flycatcher added itself to the magic of the Sacred Grove, causing all the soldiers to sprout into trees and becoming a new Sacred Grove. Because there could only be one Sacred Grove in all the worlds, Geppetto's would never grow back and the magic he had used from it was now bestowed upon Flycatcher.

The loss of the soldiers, a number of them having been sons he had constructed in the past, caused Geppetto to fall into a deep depression, cared for only by one of his enchanted daughters. This left the rest of the Empire to battle the suddenly invading opposition from Fabletown themselves. The Empire ultimately failed, thanks in large part to Pinocchio revealing vital information in exchange for Geppetto to sign the Fabletown Compact and become a citizen of Fabletown. This managed to happen as Pinocchio realized that the loyalty spells were only so that he would act in Geppetto's best interest and he strongly believed that surrender was in his father's best interest.

Geppetto was none too happy that he no longer had an empire to run and was forced to follow the rules as a citizen of Fabletown. It was during a tour of the city with Pinocchio, aided very closely by Beast, Grimble and Hobbes, that he witnessed firsthand what he had done to the people who were forced out of their home world, but refused to believe that he did anything that was not in what he felt was the best interest of the people. Being a sorcerer, Geppetto lives on the thirteenth floor of The Woodlands building with the other magic users. He soon learned that his links to outside sources had been severed and could only use spells when Frau Totenkinder allowed him to.

Geppetto was responsible for Mr. Dark's imprisonment, having recognized the threat he posed. When Mr. Dark escaped, the enchantments upon Fabletown began to fade until all of the structures collapsed. Geppetto only told riddles about the true nature of what happened before he was forced to join the others in relocating to the Farm. Soon after arriving, he slipped away from Pinocchio only to find himself confronted by Reynard The Fox, King Noble, and other animal residents. Geppetto maintained the protection spells that kept him from being harmed by their attack, but the animals then decided to bury him alive deep in the middle of the forest.

Geppetto was eventually freed from his burial imprisonment from a heavy rain which washed away the dirt over his burial spot. Seeking protection, Geppetto allied himself with Grandfather Oak, the oldest tree in the forests around the Fabletown Farm. Grandfather Oak provided Geppetto with two dryads, Prince Aspen and Princess Alder, as bodyguards.

Returning to the Farm, Geppetto sought election as the new head of the Farm, promising to solve the problem of Mr. Dark as he had many centuries ago. The Farm was split on what to do but when Rose Red, official leader of the Farm, recovered from a temporary suicidal depression, she put a quick end to Geppetto's move and appointed him one of her advisors. He is currently attempting to put a small wooden soldier spy in the new Sacred Grove so that he may learn its secrets and use it to replenish his power and salvage his Empire.

He was killed by Peter Pan in the "Black Forest" story arc as part of Pan's plan to rise to power without interference from Fables of the past.

== Powers and abilities ==
While not physically strong, Geppetto has learned a great deal of magic over the years from the various wizards belonging to the lords under his control, to the extent that he should probably be considered a sorcerer of considerable power. He has every protective spell imaginable laid over him, making him effectively impregnable - he even shrugs off a blow from the Vorpal Blade, although he does express considerable surprise that the Blade actually remained intact, the only weapon ever to do so. Like all Fables, he is effectively ageless.

As the true power behind the empire, Geppetto has enormous power in the Homelands, even if that fact remains unrecognised by the vast majority of its citizens. To all intents and purposes his will is absolute within the borders of the empire. He has a huge military force at his disposal, along with considerable magical resources.

He remains a talented woodcarver and while he had access to his magic grove, he continued to make new children at a rate that he estimated to be around twenty per year. With the later destruction of the magic grove that provided the wood and Flycatcher's acquisition of the grove's power, however, this was no longer possible.

== Original plan ==
Willingham originally intended for the Adversary to be revealed as Peter Pan. Peter would come to mundane world to steal children so they would remain young, becoming more corrupt. Also, it would turn out that Captain Hook was actually the hero attempting to rescue the children. DC Comics discovered that Peter Pan was not in the public domain in Great Britain, unlike other "Fables" characters, and thus could not be used. Willingham thus used Geppetto, an idea he has since found to be better. The alias "The Adversary" appears to be based on "The Enemy", the common term for Sauron in The Lord of the Rings. Both Hook and Pan make a brief appearance in 1001 Nights of Snowfall, fighting each other.
