= Tony Akins =

American comic book artist

- Born: November 1, 1960 (age 66)
- Areas: Penciller, Inker

Tony Akins is an artist, penciling and inking for DC/Vertigo who has contributed to the titles Jack of Fables, Fables, Hellblazer, House of Mystery and alternate issues of Wonder Woman for The New 52 relaunch.

== Early life ==
Akins is a Chicago native of Afro-Caribbean/Irish ancestry. His father, Douglas Akins, was a sign painter, graphic designer and pioneering African American cartoonist at the Chicago Defender through the 1940s to 1960s before becoming the paper's Society Editor. Educational information on Akins is limited. Although in interviews he has stated that he is autodidactic. He has association with the School of the Art Institute of Chicago through its Co-Op program. He also taught at the School in the early 1990s.

== Career ==
Akins was a founding member of the "statiCCreeps", a shadow-guild of artist/creators that pioneered a hybrid of Japanese manga in mainstream American comics during the late 1980s to early 1990s. The only published work by Akins that shows evidence of this is in Comico Comics Red Dragon which was written by Brian Azzarello (100 Bullets) in 1992. At Comico Akins also worked on Elementals, another Bill Willingham creation, as penciller and cover artist.

Akins drew the first comic book adaption of Terminator for NOW Comics after a critically acclaim stint on Rust with writer Fred Schiller. For First Comics (also in Chicago) he works on titles such as Mundan's Bar and one of a rarefied cadre of guest artists on the venerable Mike Baron/Steve Rude series Nexus.

At Dark Horse Akins worked across licensed sci-fi titles from Aliens (Colonial Marines) to Star Wars (Tales of the Jedi: The Freedon Nadd Uprising) and pencilled the adaptation of Andrew Vachss story "Warlord" (the only play written by Vachss) in the Hard Boilded series for Dark Horse.

He returned to comics with Fables #22 as a guest artist. Landed on Hellblazer: Papa Midnite, a limited series for Vertigo, then returned to Fables for "War Stories" (which can be found in the Mean Season trade paperback) before the start-up of Jack of Fables. He has also signed on as the artist for issues #5 and 6 of Wonder Woman, in The New 52 series written by Brian Azzarello.

== Comic book credits ==
DC Comics

- ABSOLUTE Wonder Woman BY Brian Azzarello AND CLIFF CHIANG VOL. 1 & 2
- AME-COMI GIRLS VOL. 1
- AME-COMI GIRLS: FEATURING WONDER WOMAN
- FABLES: THE DELUXE EDITION BOOK FIFTEEN
- FABLES: THE DELUXE EDITION BOOK TEN
- JACK OF FABLES: THE DELUXE EDITION BOOK ONE & TWO
- VERTIGO QUARTERLY: CYAN #1
- Wonder Woman #10, #13, #14, #17, #18, #19
- Wonder Woman BY BRIAN AZZARELLO AND CLIFF CHIANG OMNIBUS
- Wonder Woman VOL. 1: BLOOD
- Wonder Woman VOL. 2: GUTS
- Wonder Woman VOL. 3: IRON
- Wonder Woman VOL. 4: WAR

== Awards ==
Jack of Fables was nominated for several Eisner Awards its first year out including "Best New Series".
