= Golden Boughs Retirement Village =

The Golden Boughs Retirement Village is a fictional prison masquerading as a retirement home for fables in the Fables spin-off Jack of Fables. It is run by a man called himself Mr. Revise. The name is an explicit reference to The Golden Bough, a lengthy study in the comparative mythology, religion and folklore of hundreds of cultures, from aboriginal and extinct cultures to 19th-century faiths.

== The facility ==
The Golden Boughs consists largely of a series of cottages assigned to the various inmates, along with a number of public buildings such as a pub, plus the various buildings required to run the place.

Security consists of a fence, moat and guard towers, which are constantly manned by the junior librarians. In the event of an escape, the facility has a number of carefully trained tigers which can be released to track escapees, along with a group known as the Bagmen, powerful creatures of unknown type that inhabit an all-encompassing outfit that gives them humanoid shape and which can be folded down to resemble a large bag. Each guard tower is equipped with a Doubling Rook, a magical bird that, when released, will multiply quickly until all available food is exhausted, and can be used to deal with any attempt at an aerial escape.

The Golden Boughs resembles the Village of The Prisoner in some ways, and as he escapes from the Golden Boughs, Jack Horner explicitly makes the connection in a narrative aside to the reader about the place "in the British TV show" guarded by the evil "weather balloon".

After the Bookburner's strike on the Golden Boughs, Jack, his fellow Fables, the Literals and the librarians were forced to release Wy'east Klickitat and Loo-With, Native American mountain spirits who unleashed a roaring volcano upon escape, marking the end of the Golden Boughs Retirement Village.

== Staff ==
The facility is overseen by Mr. Revise, a Literal who has made it his mission to rid the world of magic. He is supported by the Page Sisters, referred to as senior librarians, and a host of lesser staff members.

Of ambiguous status is the Pathetic Fallacy, Revise's Literal grandfather, who personifies that concept.

== Inmates ==
Fables associated with Jack and Revise

- The Tin Man
- The Cowardly Lion (who turned out to be a Lion looking for restraint before he was revised)
- The Scarecrow
- Dorothy Gale
- Toto (Oz)
- The Walrus and the Carpenter
- Babe the Blue Ox
- Raven
- Mother Goose
- Cuchulainn
- Kiviuq and his Polar Bear
- Little Black Sambo who grew into an old man
- Carl, the fourth of the Three Little Pigs
- Revised versions of the Butcher, the Baker and the Candlestick-Maker
- Wynken, Blynken, and Nod
- Mustardseed and Cobweb from A Midsummer Night's Dream
- Lola the Cottingley Fairy

Fables with unknown locations

- Lady Luck
- Goldilocks
- Humpty Dumpty
- Alice
- John Henry
- Pecos Bill
- Peaseblossom and Moth from A Midsummer Night's Dream
- Doris the Cottingley Fairy,
- The Tooth fairy
- Mary, Mary, Quite Contrary
- Paul Bunyan
- Wicked John (an earlier version of Jack Horner)
- Wy'east, Klickawit and Loo-Wit
- Revised versions of the Tortoise and the Hare
- The Mad Hatter, the March Hare and the Dormouse
- Assorted Munchkins
- The Cat and the Fiddle from Hey Diddle Diddle
- The Jersey Devil
- Daisy-Head Mayzie
- Little Tommy Tucker
- The cat with bagpipes, the mouse and the bumblebee from the nursery rhyme A Cat Came Fiddling out of a Barn.
- The cats and family from the poem As I Was Going to St Ives
- The Black Sheep and boy from Baa Baa Black Sheep
- The little oysters from The Walrus and the Carpenter
- Black Caroline, from Edmund Dulac's story White Caroline and Black Caroline, from Edmund Dulac's Fairy Book. The cottage that Jack moves into is referred to as "Black Caroline's old place".
- The Caterpillar, a violet/pink caterpillar, which may or may not be The Caterpillar, is shown eating a leaf while Humpty Dumpty tries to convince Jack to let him escape with the others.
