= Jack Horner (comics) =

- Jack running from Fabletown, cover art for Jack of Fables #1.

Publication information
- Publisher: Vertigo Comics
- First appearance: Fables #1 (July 2002)
- Created by: Bill Willingham

In-story information
- Team affiliations: Fabletown
- Notable aliases: Jack Be Nimble, Jack Frost, Jack the Giant Killer, Jack O'Lantern, Jack of the Tales, John Trick, Jack Candle
- Abilities: Master con artist; Questionable high strategic skills; Nigh-immortality; High physical endurance; Superhuman strength; Fourth wall awareness; Dragon transformation; Precognition; Low-level reality warping

Jack Horner is a fictional character in the comic book series Fables by Bill Willingham. His first appearance was in issue #1 of Fables and he continued as a regular character of the series until leaving the series for his own title, Jack of Fables. The character is based on various nursery rhymes and fables with characters named Jack, including Little Jack Horner, Jack and the Beanstalk, Jack and Jill, Jack Be Nimble, Jack Frost, Jack O'Lantern, and Jack the Giant Killer, and among others.

== Characterization ==
Jack is typically portrayed as a rather benign trickster, always looking for quick ways to make a buck, but he also displays a complete disregard for human life or the feelings of those around him, traits most often seen in those with sociopathy. Despite his scheming and reckless personality, he is a devoted foe of the Adversary and a capable combatant in his own right, due to his years of experience fighting giants. He can also have true feelings for others (he asks the Beast about Snow White and her cubs, he mourns his wife's death, and he considered putting his own safety at risk to protect Gary when the Librarians captured them, and they were having a car accident). In the series, Jack creates a film trilogy of his adventures to increase his popularity in the Mundy world, making him nigh-immortal (a theory that is still strongly disputed to this day, even by Frau Totenkinder). In his devoted spin-off series Jack of Fables, his nigh-immortality seems to be reinforced by other factors as well: he is the son of a literal woman and one of the most popular male Fables, and he has made countless deals with many devils during his Jack O' Lantern days. Jack is often presented as believing himself to be far smarter than he truly is, and for a man who has lived a long time, he has little regard for history. The common thread is how Jack honestly believes he is the most important person around and that only his needs and desires matter.

The characters of Jack Sprat and Jack Ketch have been established as completely separate entities from Fable Jack, who is in fact a representation of Jack Horner.

It was recently revealed that Jack was not, in fact, involved in the Beanstalk or Giant-killing incidents, but is actually an unknowing copy of an older fable named Wicked John. Upon Wicked John's death, some great power decided to write the trickster back into some later stories, but got his name wrong, thus creating Jack. John was later revived, and now both fables exist and enjoy a greatly antagonistic relationship, but Mister Revise later revealed after the War with Bookburner in a retcon, that Jack was indeed the one who sold his cow for magical beans, and that he is the son of a Literal, and Prince Charming.
