= Pinocchio (Fables) =

Publication information
- Publisher: Vertigo Comics
- First appearance: Fables #1
- Created by: Bill Willingham

In-story information
- Team affiliations: Fabletown
- Abilities: Multiple protection spells are placed on him

Pinocchio is a character in the comic book series Fables. The wooden boy magically brought to life in the story by Carlo Collodi, he was among those Fables who fled to the mundane world and formed a community in New York City.

== Personality ==
Pinocchio is first seen during the Remembrance Day gala scene in "Legends in Exile", where he reveals to a fellow Fable that he is angry at the Blue Fairy for granting his wish to be a real boy in such a way that he would never grow up into a man. He is over three hundred years old but hasn't hit puberty. He attends the celebration every year in the hopes that she will show up so that he can finally give her a piece of his mind (and boot).

== Appearance ==
Pinocchio is always shown as a very short person with short dark hair, but other specifics of his appearance vary depending on the artist. In "A Wolf in the Fold" and "Around the Town", he is drawn as a typical prepubescent child with a slender frame and a receding chin, but most other chapters show him with thick shoulders, a square jaw and a heavy brow. Nevertheless, in "A Two-Part Caper", Bigby describes Pinocchio as looking like a little boy.

Mark Buckingham, one of the primary artists on the series, draws Pinocchio with a jutting lower lip and, even when speaking, always with his mouth closed; Buckingham depicts all wooden characters in this same way.

== Character history ==
=== Pinocchio and Geppetto ===
In "March of the Wooden Soldiers", Pinocchio realizes that his father Geppetto must still be alive. He concludes that he has been enslaved by the Adversary and forced to carve wooden armies for him. Pinocchio wishes to return to the Homelands to find his father, but is beheaded during the Battle of Fabletown, reverting immediately to his original wooden form. He is later carried back to the Homelands by his friend Boy Blue and restored to life by Geppetto, who turns out to be the Adversary himself. As Boy Blue escapes Geppetto's clutches, he offers Pinocchio a chance to return to Fabletown. Pinocchio, very confused, opts to stay with his father, possibly because of the loyalty geas Geppetto had placed on him. As such, despite any misgivings that he might have, Pinocchio becomes unable to act against his father's interests. During an incursion by Bigby Wolf, it is revealed Pinocchio is also protected magically against multiple forms of harm. An explosion only served to confuse him.

=== The imperial conference ===
In "Sons of Empire", Pinocchio attends the imperial conference with his father, where he is expected to provide details of Fabletown's population and defenses, having been a longtime resident. When the Snow Queen describes an apocalyptic plans for dealing with the mundane world: a series of plagues, fires and then a three-year winter to wipe out the mundy civilization and reduce any survivors to barbarism, Pinocchio is appalled. After a discussion with Sir Rodney Greenwood, he finds himself in the position of having to make a counter-proposal. He responds by saying that an attack of that magnitude would prompt Fabletown to reveal its existence to the mundys (mundane peoples), would be so angry at the Empire's use of biological weapons that they would immediately unite with Fabletown and with each other, using their combined infrastructure and technology to invade the Homelands using magic, automatic weapons and fighter jets. As such, Geppetto decides that the Snow Queen's three-year plan will not work. The others believe Pinocchio, for he is magically compelled to only have the Adversary's best interests at heart. Secretly, Geppetto tells the Snow Queen that they must wipe out Fabletown without first attacking the mundys.

=== "War and Pieces" ===
Pinocchio later escapes from the Imperial homeworld and makes it to Fabletown, where he negotiates a deal to end the war with the Empire. The terms of the deal are that Pinocchio would reveal the location of five hidden gates to the Fables and, in exchange, Geppetto would be allowed to sign the Fabletown Compact and offered the same general amnesty for past deeds as Bigby and Frau Totenkinder. Pinocchio is able to seemingly go against Geppetto's wishes and ally with his father's enemies because he believes himself to be acting in Geppetto's best interests. Attempting to cheer his father up, Pinocchio finds an old set of wooden soldiers Geppetto had worked on centuries before and gives them to his father as a present. Geppetto is pleased and Pinocchio is happy that he has helped his father, unaware that the soldiers are alive and Geppetto plans to use them as his spies.
