= Chrissie Zullo =

Comic book artist

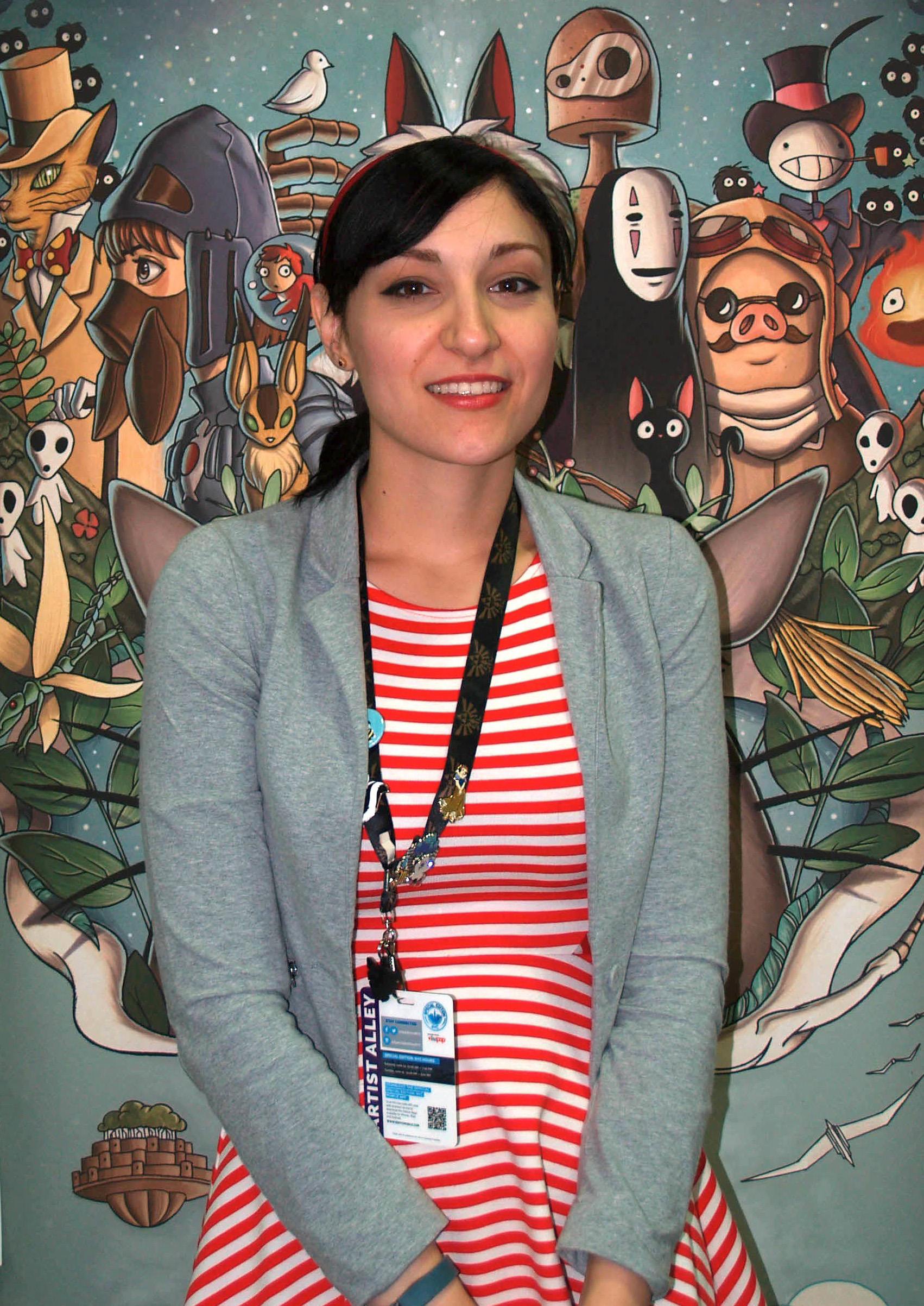
- Chrissie Zullo at the 2014 Special Edition NYC
- Born: Canada
- Area: Penciller
- Notable works: Fables

Chrissie Zullo (born December 1, 1986) is a comic book artist whose notable works include the covers for Cinderella: From Fabletown with Love. Her work been compared to that of Tara McPherson.

== Early life ==
Chrissie Zullo was born in Canada. She has since lived in South Florida, North Carolina, and New York City, before settling in Connecticut.

Zullo has stated that Alphonse Mucha is an influence on her art, as well as historical French and Japanese art in general. Her style, which she describes as "flowy, dreamy, and whimsical", is also influenced by modern comics artists such as Winsor McCay, Adam Hughes, Travis Charest and James Jean, and she names The Umbrella Academy #2 as her favorite James Jean cover.

== Career ==
Chrissie Zullo was recognized by an editor at the DC Talent Search at San Diego Comic Con 2008. After six months, she was offered the job for illustrating the covers of the Cinderella: From Fabletown with Love series. Her first interior sequential work was on Madame Xanadu #26.

For the release of Star Wars: The Force Awakens in 2015, Zullo was commissioned by Fandango Media to create a series of "Women in Star Wars" posters as comic book style portraits.

In 2018, Zullo was chosen to be part of DC Collectibles' DC Artists Alley designer vinyl collection. Four vinyl figures were created based on Zullo's artwork.

== Technique and materials ==
Zullo uses acrylic wash to render her illustrations in black and white, and colors them with Adobe Photoshop.

== Reception ==
David Pepose, reviewing Zullo's work on Madame Xanadu #26 for Newsarama, praised her work on that issue, stating that "her style could not be more suitable for the pure emotion this tale evokes".

== Selected bibliography ==
- Covers for Cinderella: From Fabletown with Love #1 - 6
- Covers for Cinderella: Fables are Forever #1 - 6
- Sequentials on interiors for Fables #100
- Sequentials on interiors for Madame Xanadu #26
- Covers for Vampirella (2016) #1-6
- Variant cover for Archie (comic book) vol. 2 #2
- Variant cover for Hack/Slash #34
- Variant cover for Betty and Veronica vol. 3 #1
- Variant cover for Star Wars Forces of Destiny - Leia
- Variant cover for Batman: The Adventures Continue #1
- Variant cover for Vengeance of Vampirella #1
- Variant cover for The Last Witch #1
- Variant cover for By the Horns #1
