= Pantheon (Lone Star Press) =

Dystopian superhero comic

Publication information
- Publisher: Lone Star Press
- Schedule: Irregular
- Format: Ongoing series
- Genre: Superhero
- Publication date: May 1998 – May 2004
- No. of issues: 13

Creative team
- Created by: Bill Willingham
- Written by: Bill Willingham
- Artist(s): Steve Lieber; Brian Hagan; Mike Leeke
- Letterer: Brad Thomte
- Colorist: Patric Lewandowski

Pantheon is an American comic book series written by Bill Willingham. The series was published by independent publisher Lone Star Press and is set in its own self-contained universe.

The complete series was published in thirteen issues. The first six were published in 1998–1999. The next six were published in 2001 and the final issue was published in May 2004.

== Plot ==
The hero Dynasty gathers her colleagues in the superhero group Freedom Machine to inform them of a new threat. Their former colleague, the massively powerful telekinetic Daedelus, has decided to take over the world. Worried about Daedelus' unparalleled power, the Freedom Machine decides to gather all the heroes they can to fight him. Meanwhile, Daedelus kills one of his former colleagues and destroys an advanced underwater civilization to keep them from interfering in his plans.

The darkness-powered superhero Shadowpax recounts to a group of young superheroes the story of the Freedom Machine's most challenging threat to date. Years ago, they had to do battle with Deathboy, a psychotic teenager protected by an impenetrable force field and with the ability to disintegrate anything he sees. The Freedom Machine battled Deathboy in a desert where he killed several superheroes before Shadowpax was able to trap him in a block of solid darkness, where he remains imprisoned in the Freedom Machine's headquarters.

In his first strike Daedalus releases several prominent supervillains in order to keep his former colleagues occupied. These include Kid Babylon, a young man who has an Elder God trapped in a box, Chaos Nation, a composite being who absorbs others, the gigantic canine Thunderdog, and the supernatural Doctor Meggido. As the Freedom Machine confronts these villains, the superbeing Outrider returns to Earth, seeking revenge on Dynasty. He is killed by Ivanhoe, but not before severely mutilating Dynasty.

The non-powered adventurer Johnny Venture and his group the Darkside Rangers, take possession of the Freedom Machine's headquarters under authority of the US government. They are looking for a solution to the superhuman problem. They free Deathboy from his prison of darkness and while he is unconscious they implant a bomb inside him. They use this to force Deathboy to agree to their demands. The Freedom Machine begin their assault on Daedelus' island headquarters, but he brings the fighting to an end when he threatens to destroy the Earth, a threat they believe he has the power to carry out. The Darkside Rangers send Deathboy parachuting towards the island, which he destroys. Venture then reneges on his deal and uses the bomb to kill Deathboy. It is revealed that Deathboy had not actually destroyed anyone. Instead all the people and objects he had "disintegrated" were actually transported to an alternate dimension. The Freedom Machine joyously greet their long lost colleagues. Daedelus then announces his intention to take over this new world, but he soon dies from a biological poison which he was exposed to during the fight.

== Collected editions ==
The first six issues of the series have been recolored and collected in a trade paperback edition with new material.

There is also:

- Pantheon: The Complete Script Book (560 pages, Lone Star Press, April 2005, ISBN 0-9759544-1-5)

== See also ==
- Irredeemable
- Squadron Supreme
- Watchmen
