= Proposition Player =

1999 comic book miniseries by Bill Willingham and Paul Guinan

Publication information
- Publisher: Vertigo imprint of DC Comics
- Schedule: Monthly
- Format: Limited series
- Publication date: 1999
- No. of issues: 6
- Main character(s): Joey Martin

Creative team
- Created by: Bill Willingham
- Written by: Bill Willingham
- Artist(s): Paul Guinan

Proposition Player is a six-issue American comic book limited series created by writer Bill Willingham and artist Paul Guinan, published by the American comic book label Vertigo imprint of DC Comics.

== Plot ==
Proposition Player tells the story of Joey Martin, a Las Vegas proposition player employed by casinos to join dull card games in order to liven up the gaming. Years of experience have made Joey an expert, if unsatisfied, card player.

One night, during a round of drinks, he is pushed into a proposition that sees him buy the souls of thirty-two people for the price of one free beer each. It is not long before those who sold their souls are suffering fatal accidents one by one, and the forces of Heaven and Hell show up trying to put a price on the purchased souls for themselves.
