= Boy Blue (Fables) =

- Boy Blue from Fables #31, art by Mark Buckingham.

Publication information
- Publisher: Vertigo Comics
- First appearance: Fables #1 (July 2002)
- Created by: Bill Willingham

In-story information
- Team affiliations: Fabletown
- Abilities: Skilled Trumpet player; efficient administrative assistant; Master of the Witching Cloak; warrior of considerable prowess

Boy Blue is a major character in the Vertigo comic book series Fables. He is based on the nursery rhyme character Little Boy Blue. At the beginning of the series, he is portrayed as an efficient but meek office clerk helping Snow White run Fabletown, but he has a colorful and violent history that is gradually revealed as the series goes on.

== Appearance ==
Throughout Fables, Boy Blue is depicted as a young man in his mid-to-late teens with blue eyes and blond hair. In Fabletown, he has his hair cut short and wears modern clothes in his signature color. He usually has a modern, valved trumpet of some kind on or near his person. He wears Chuck Taylor All-Stars.

In flashbacks, Boy Blue is shown as a medieval squire or page in blue livery, with hair that touches his shoulders.

During "Homelands," Blue, when not transformed or in disguise, is drawn with a blue cloth mask tied over his hair and the top half of his face, matching the dark blue color of the Witching Cloak. He carries a valveless blowing horn. When Blue takes the shape of an animal for travel or concealment, the color blue usually remains prominent in some way: he is shown once as a mouse with a blue traveling cloak and repeatedly as a bird with blue feathers. It is not revealed whether this is because of Blue's affinity for the color or an inherent trait of the Witching Cloak.

== Character history ==
=== Before Fabletown ===
Boy Blue's backstory as a fighter against the Adversary's forces is revealed in "The Last Castle" as Blue tells Snow White the story of the Fables who defended the last open gate to the mundane world. This is at the tail end of the Adversary's campaign against the European fables, with most of them having either already escaped, enslaved or killed. Blue fights with Colonel Bearskin's Free Company, eventually becoming the colonel's aide-de-camp. Blue had at that time survived several battles.

The day before the last battle, a woman claiming to be Red Riding Hood rides into the fort nearly dead from arrow wounds. She and Blue quickly became infatuated with each other, to the extent that she suggests that Friar Tuck should marry them so that Blue will be allotted a seat on the last ship out. Citing his duty, he refuses. Arriving for battle in the morning, he learns his new orders: he will observe the battle from a high parapet and, at the appropriate time, will use a powerful but poorly understood item known as the Witching Cloak to teleport himself to the ship with the message that the last defenders have fallen and they are on their own. Fabletown will need to know what happened, Bearskin tells him, but he also sees this as a way for Blue and Riding Hood to be together. When Blue arrives on the ship, he discovers that Riding Hood, not wanting to live without him, had given up her spot to a stranger and stayed behind.

=== Fabletown ===
Boy Blue first appears during the first compilation of the comic working as Snow White's office gofer and clerk. He is one of the few people who can get Bufkin, the flying monkey who serves as Fabletown's librarian, to do his work. Blue is one of Fabletown's most skilled musicians; he takes his horn with him everywhere. He occasionally tries to get gigs in Harlem jazz and blues clubs, but is always told that he is too young, too white or "too hayseed." His roommate is Pinocchio; the two of them, along with Flycatcher are best friends. Blue lives a typical "nerdy" lifestyle, avidly reading comic books and playing board games.

Blue's life changes in "March of the Wooden Soldiers," when Red Riding Hood suddenly appears in Fabletown, claiming to have recently escaped the Adversary. She is initially angry at Blue, claiming that he had abandoned her to the Adversary's forces, but she soon seeks him out and wants to resume their relationship. After a sexual encounter, he realizes that she is not the Riding Hood he remembers. "Red" reveals that she is actually Baba Yaga using Red's form as a mystical disguise. Along with three wooden soldiers, she tortures Blue for several days, breaking all his fingers, before having the soldiers deliver him, along with a message from the Adversary, to the Woodlands business office.

Against Snow's objections, Blue has Dr. Swineheart patch him up and bind the Vorpal Sword to his hands so that he can fight in the Battle of Fabletown. In the street-level battle, Blue is injured by gunfire. After the battle, Dr. Swineheart's treatments allow Blue to regain full use of his hands.

=== Return to the Homelands ===
After Pinocchio is dismembered during "The March of the Wooden Soldiers," Blue leaves for the Homelands, taking the Vorpal Sword, the Witching Cloak and Pinocchio's puppet body. Most of Blue's exploits there are detailed in "Homelands." The Witching Cloak acts as Blue's armor. It cannot be burned, stretched, or ripped, provides endless storage, and it gives its wearer shape-shifting abilities. Blue spends some time killing the Empire's soldiers, impersonating at least one governor, killing at least one dragon, and working his way toward the capital. While in Rus, the Homeland corresponding to real-world Russia, he kills three knights that are magically connected to Baba Yaga; the fact that their severed heads keep talking alerts Blue to the fact that she is still alive in Fabletown.

During the Emperor's bimonthly public address, Blue impersonates a peasant so that he can get close enough to kill the Emperor. This reveals that the Emperor is only a giant puppet, like the wooden soldiers who'd attacked Fabletown. The Snow Queen encases Blue in a block of ice, trapping him. He wakes up without any of his magical equipment, imprisoned in Geppetto's cabin. He offers Geppetto, who still holds some affection for his first-carved son, Pinocchio's body to revive in exchange for two demands and one request: the full story behind the Empire's rise, an audience with the real Red Riding Hood, and a chance to speak to Pinocchio after his revival, respectively. When Red Riding Hood arrives, Blue discovers that woman he had met during "The Last Castle" was, like Baba Yaga, an impostor and spy. The true Red Riding Hood has never met him before. A heartbroken Blue calls the Witching Cloak to him, slays Geppetto's guards, and escapes back to Fabletown. Pinocchio, again intact but now under a loyalty spell to Geppetto, does not come with him. Blue does bring along the true Riding Hood, whom he feels is no longer safe in Geppetto's lands.

Although the Fabletown community believes that Blue had stolen the Vorpal Sword and Witching Cloak, in actuality Blue had been sent on a secret mission by Prince Charming and has used the Witching Cloak's infinite storage space to store books from every library he'd come across. He brings Fabletown hundreds of volumes containing valuable maps and intelligence, but Charming is unwilling to make this knowledge public, so Blue has to stand trial. He is sentenced to two years of hard labor at the Farm. Rose Red, the Farm's administrator, considers him a hero and takes a very loose interpretation of hard labor.

Blue leads the construction of Bigby's house in Wolf Valley and serves as Bigby's best man when he marries Snow. Blue nurtures romantic feelings for Rose.

=== The war ===
During "War and Pieces," which tells of the war to reclaim the Homelands, Blue is given the job of transporting back and forth from numerous points to act as messenger and delivery boy to the Fables' strongpoints: Glory, Fort Bravo, Fabletown, Wolf Manor, the Farm, Haven, and the hotspot in the center of the Empire where Briar Rose is stationed.

Everything runs smoothly until the Empire makes a final attempt to shift the tide. Blue is at Fort Bravo when a magic arrow is shot at Bigby. Blue tries to use the Witching Cloak to shield Bigby, but the magic of the arrow allows it to penetrate the Cloak, lodging Blue's arm and scratching Bigby. The effects of the arrow cause both Blue and Bigby to fall unconscious for several days. Upon awakening, Blue keeps what is left of the arrow sticking in his arm. Even wounded, he continues to use the Witching Cloak to retrieve and deliver weapons. He ultimately uses the Vorpal Sword to chop the head off the Emperor. Later, he, along with Pinocchio, retrieves Geppetto and brings him to Fabletown.

=== Convalescence and death ===
During the aftermath of the war, Doctor Swinehart removes the remainder of the arrow. Despite this, an infection sets in, causing Blue greater discomfort than before. These complications are later revealed to be caused by a minute thread of the Witching Cloak still lodged in Blue's arm, a problem possibly exacerbated by Mr. Dark casting his unbinding spell on the cloak before the thread is removed. Swineheart eventually amputates Blue's arm above the elbow.

Boy Blue's condition continues to worsen despite both Frau Totenkinder and Doctor Swineheart's best efforts. After the collapse of Fabletown, he is moved with the other refugees to the Farm, where Flycatcher attempts, unsuccessfully, to magically cure Blue's condition. On Blue's deathbed, Rose Red immediately leaves her husband and tries to marry Boy Blue before he dies, but Blue turns her down. He points out that she is only attracted to those who offer the most excitement, good or bad, and that he deserves better than her. He apologizes that she is broken but he is not the one to fix her.

Blue requests that he be buried on a hill overlooking the baseball field in Haven rather than with the other war dead, to reflect his lifelong preference for a quiet life over heroics.

Blue later meets up with Bigby in the afterlife to orient him (mentioning that Colonel Bearskin had helped orient him). They talk about the value of life. He tells Bigby he has no intentions of returning and says his final farewell. Before doing so, he tells Bigby there was someone else who wanted to see him (his son Darien) before leaving.

=== Legacy ===
Some of Blue's friends wonder whether he will return from the dead, as some Fables do. Pinocchio and Flycatcher conclude that, since Blue is only known to the mundanes in one nursery rhyme, it is unlikely that he will be able to come back soon or even at all. Nevertheless, Rose Red resolves to become a better person, someone worthy of Blue, by the time he returns, though this could be because she's too shattered by his rejection.

After Blue's death, the non-human Farm Fables, particularly Stinky the Badger, elevate Blue to religious status, wearing blue scarves as signs of their devotion. Stinky preaches with great conviction that Blue will one day return to usher in an age of great peace and equality. When Jack Horner returns to the farm during "The Great Fables Crossover," Stinky and some others mistake him for the returning Blue in disguise. Jack is quick to take advantage of the situation.

Clara notes with unease that Stinky's eyes, formerly brown, have turned blue. Despite this, Boy Blue has yet to come back and, although Mr. Dark was defeated, it wasn't by Blue. Stinky still believes that Boy Blue came back for the battle and that he and other followers missed it.

In "All in a Single Night," Rose Red visits a land of lost souls. A shadowy, semitransparent figure strongly resembling Boy Blue gets her to promise him a kiss, but when she learns he is noncorporeal, he tells her that her promise means she must also restore him to life. Whether or not this shade is Boy Blue is unclear, and Rose did not seem to recognize him.

=== Ultimate fate ===
Boy Blue meets Bigby Wolf shortly after the latter enters the afterlife and advises him of his options. He tells Bigby that he, Blue, is leaving to be reincarnated in a different universe so that he can have a chance at a quiet life with no heroics and that he might try his hand at falling in love. He requests that, if Bigby should manage to come back to life, he ask Brock and the others at the farm to stop worshiping him.

Blue briefly returns as a soldier in Rose Red's vast army when she raises vast cosmic powers against Snow in an attempt to gain yet more power from her. Rose, seeking advice from what she believes is a common sword bearer, realizes she is on a foolish quest after listening to a short tale from Blue. Inspired by this, Rose brings a successful truce.

The second-to-last compilation, "Fables: Happily Ever After," shows Blue at an open mic night in another world, where he performs songs about his old friends.

== Relationship to the Witching Cloak ==
In "The Last Castle," Blue's commanding officer hands him the Witching Cloak so that he can fulfill a messenger mission. At that time, the characters know only a little about the cloak's powers. In a later chapter, Blue remarks that if he had known then what he later learned about the cloak's capabilities, he could have won the entire battle single-handedly.

In the last pages of "March of the Wooden Soldiers," the readers are informed that Blue has been practicing and experimenting with the Witching Cloak for several centuries: Prince Charming requests that the cloak be brought to him and he discovers that Blue has taken it and run off. In this scene, the readers are informed that many of the powerful magical items brought to Fabletown by the fleeing refugees had been assigned to Fabletown citizens who had been deemed capable of experimenting with them and figuring out how they work in case they are ever needed for the town's defense. Charming is informed that the Witching Cloak, although technically Fabletown property, had been assigned to Boy Blue.

During "Homelands," Blue is shown as adept at using the cloak for disguise, storage, concealment and protection. At one point, he uses the fireproof cloak to tie a dragon's mouth shut so that it will explode and die. He also uses simple voice commands to call the cloak to him from a short distance away and claims he can set it to self-destruct with all its contents. He uses this also as a threat against Geppetto (the Emperor) to prevent him to use it in battle against the fables in Fabletown. Blue eventually dies as a result of a tiny thread of the Witching Cloak becoming lodged inside an arrow wound in his arm, preventing it from healing.

The Witching Cloak is drawn pink in "The Last Castle," but at all other times it is drawn in some shade of blue. As of "Farewell," no in-universe explanation has been given for this as either a genuine change in the cloak's appearance or a continuity oversight. "Boxing Days" reveals that the cloak was made from Mr. Dark's bag of nightmares, which is shown in shades of gray and brown.

== Critical reception and cultural impact ==
Jason Marc Harris, writing in a special issue of Humanities, cites both Blue's undiginified death and his words to Bigby in the afterlife as a counterpoint to the glorification of masculine-coded violence in the story arc involving the war against the Adversary, contrasting it with the series finale, which focused on forgiveness and community, and was led by female characters: "The martial prowess that Bigby, Prince Charming, and Boy Blue once represented becomes overshadowed by the enduring connections of the extended Fables family, a community where Rose and Snow reconcile."
