= Fairest (comics) =

American monthly comic series

- Cover for Fairest #1 (May 2012), art by Adam Hughes.

Publication information
- Publisher: Vertigo
- Schedule: Monthly
- Format: Ongoing series
- Genre: Contemporary fantasy, dark fantasy, urban fantasy
- Publication date: March 2012 – January 2015
- No. of issues: 33
- Main characters: Briar Rose; The Snow Queen; Ali Baba; Beauty and the Beast; Rapunzel; Princess Alder; Reynard the Fox; Nalayani; Prince Charming; Goldilocks; Cinderella

Creative team
- Created by: Bill Willingham
- Written by: Bill Willingham; Lilah Sturges (credited as Matthew Sturges); Lauren Beukes; Sean E. Williams; Marc Andreyko
- Penciller(s): Phil Jimenez; Shawn McManus; Inaki Miranda; Barry Kitson; Stephen Sadowski; Meghan Hetrick-Murante
- Inker(s): Andy Lanning; Shawn McManus
- Letterer: Todd Klein
- Colourist(s): Andrew Dalhouse; Shawn McManus
- Editor(s): Shelly Bond; Gregory Lockard (asst.)

Fairest is an American monthly comic series created by Bill Willingham, published by DC's Vertigo. A spin-off of Fables, Fairest details the adventures and stories of Fabletown's female citizens and heroines. Fairest is described by Willingham as a series of miniseries, with each arc telling self-contained stories.

The series ended in January 2015.

== Story arcs ==
Wide Awake (issues #1 to 6): Follows the misadventures of Briar Rose and the Snow Queen after the events of Fables #107, in which Briar was stolen away by the goblin army.

Lamia (issue #7): Beauty and Beast star in their own mid-century modern detective story set in the smoky clubs and dive bars of 1940s Los Angeles.

The Hidden Kingdom (issues #8 to 13): A prequel to the Fables story arc Legends in Exile. Rapunzel must travel from Fabletown to Tokyo and resolve a mystery from her troubled past.

Aldered States (issue #14): Princess Alder tells her tales of woe to Reynard the Fox.

The Return of the Maharaja (issue #15 to 20): When Nalayani's village is attacked, she is sent on a quest that will transform all of Fables forever.

Fairest in All the Land (graphic novel): Someone is killing the women of Fabletown, and Cinderella has only seven days to discover the identity of the murderer.

Of Men and Mice (issue #21 to 26): After an assassination attempt on Snow White, Cinderella is called back into service to unravel an age-old conspiracy that dates back to that fateful midnight ball.

Clamour for Glamour (issue #27 to 32): Refugees from Fabletown have returned to New York's Castle Dark, and Reynard, now able to shapeshift from fox to man, travels the mundane world to regale the animals with tales of his exploits.

Goldilocks and the Three (or More) Bears (issue #33): Final issue, but leads into the original graphic novel, Fairest: In All the Land.

== Collected editions ==
#	Title	ISBN	Release date	Collected material
1	Fairest Vol. 1: Wide Awake	ISBN 1-4012-3550-6	November 27, 2012	Fairest #1–7
2	Fairest Vol. 2: Hidden Kingdom	ISBN 1-4012-4021-6	July 30, 2013	Fairest #8-14
3	Fairest Vol. 3: The Return of the Maharaja	ISBN 1-4012-4593-5	June 3, 2014	Fairest #15-20
4	Fairest Vol. 4: Of Men and Mice	ISBN 1-4012-5005-X	October 7, 2014	Fairest #21-26
5	Fairest Vol. 5: The Clamour for Glamour	ISBN 1-4012-5426-8	August 25, 2015	Fairest #27-33
	Fairest In All the Land	ISBN 1-4012-3900-5	November 26, 2013	Original graphic novel
