= Ironwood (comics) =

Pornographic comic book series by Bill Willingham

Publication information
- Publisher: Eros Comix
- Schedule: Bimonthly
- Publication date: January 1991 – September 1995
- No. of issues: 11
- Main character(s): Dave Dragovon; Pandora Breedlswight

Creative team
- Written by: Bill Willingham
- Artist(s): Bill Willingham

Ironwood is a pornographic comic book series written and drawn by Bill Willingham in the 1990s, published in the United States by Eros Comix. It ran for 11 issues; the first six issues being published in 1991, the remaining five taking another four years to produce/publish. The series was collected into two trade paperbacks; volume 1 was published in 1993 (ISBN 1560972041), and volume 2 was published in 1996 (ISBN 156097222X).

== Plot summary ==
Ironwood follows the adventures of Dave Dragavon, a juvenile dragon existing only in human form (not yet having matured enough to take full dragon form) who is hired by the beautiful Pandora Breedlswight to find the wizard Gnaric in order to free her from a curse.

The comics are a mixture of sword and sorcery, sexual situations and adult humor.
