= Cinderella: From Fabletown with Love =

American comic book limited series

- Cover to Cinderella: From Fabletown With Love #1, art by Chrissie Zullo.

Publication information
- Schedule: Monthly
- Format: Limited series
- No. of issues: 6

Creative team
- Written by: Chris Roberson
- Artist(s): Shawn McManus and Chrissie Zullo

Collected editions
- Cinderella: From Fabletown with Love: ISBN 1-4012-2750-3

Cinderella: From Fabletown with Love is an American comic book limited series published by Vertigo Comics in 2009 and 2010, and set in the world of Fables. The story portrays Cinderella as a secret agent, performing missions on behalf of Fabletown. Its title is an allusion to the James Bond novel From Russia, with Love.

The series was written by Chris Roberson with art by Shawn McManus and cover art by Chrissie Zullo; a compilation of the six issues was published in August 2010. From Fabletown with Love was followed up with the mini-series Cinderella: Fables Are Forever in 2011; its title is an allusion to James Bond novel Diamonds Are Forever.

In the story, the spy Cinderella travels to Dubai to prevent the sale of magical items to non-magical people. She and her allies then travel to Ultima Thule, in order to confront the totalitarian government of the Fairy Godmother.

== Plot ==
The story centers on one of the covert espionage missions undertaken by Cinderella for Fabletown's government. Her latest assignment is to track and prevent the sale of magical items from the Fables' Homelands dimensions to "mundies", the non-magical people of Earth. Cindy's search takes her to Dubai where she encounters Aladdin, who is on a similar mission for the Arabian Fables. The two are initially at odds but soon become friends and eventually, lovers. The series also introduces several of Cinderella's agents, whom she can call upon with a magic bracelet. These include Puss in Boots, Jenny Wren (the former love of the deceased Cock Robin), and Dickory (a mouse with power over time and clocks).

The source of the illegal sales proves to be a trio of liberated concubines from the Arabian Fable Homeland, hoping to profit from the capitalistic mundy world. They, however, are working for an unseen employer. Following a lead, Cinderella and her allies travel to Ultima Thule, a frigid Fable world controlled by a totalitarian government that forces everyone to smile on threat of physical harm. The mastermind behind the scheme proves to be Cinderella's Fairy Godmother, who is now ruling Ultima Thule and has become overzealous in her attempts to make the world pleasant. Cindy and her allies are able to stop her plans thanks to Dickory, who causes time in Ultima Thule to speed up to midnight, the hour when the Godmother's magic wears off.

The series features a sub-plot involving Crispin Cordwainer, Cinderella's assistant at the Fabletown shoe store she operates as a cover for her spy activities. Crispin proves to be the famous cobbler of The Elves and the Shoemaker and still maintains a business relationship with the Elves. The magical shoes he commissions them to make cause problems for the people of Fabletown, who are unable to stop dancing, jogging, or moving while wearing the shoes. This is cleared up when the shoes are transferred safely to injured Fables. Those who cannot walk would enjoy periods of magical movement.

== Reception ==
PopMatters's Shaun Huston ranked it one of the best comics of 2010, and declared that it "treats its hero with respect". Comic Book Resources's Greg McElhatton praised the first issue's action sequences, but noted that the story was "badly out of sync" with the rest of Fables, and that thus it lacks "a certain level of excitement or tension", while, at IGN, Richard George commended Roberson's characterization and plotting in the first issue, but faulted the story for "adher(ing) strictly to spy genre clichés". Tor.com's Lee Mandelo faulted Roberson's characterization as being too unlike that of regular Fables author Bill Willingham, and summarized the plot as "evil feminists did it"; Mandelo also described the portrayal of the concubines, who still wore "stereotyped 'sexy harem' outfits" even while secretly trading in munitions, as "mind-bogglingly stupid and badly thought out".

== External sources ==
- Cinderella: From Fabletown With Love at comicbookdb
