= Peter & Max: A Fables Novel =

Book by Bill Willingham

Peter & Max
- First edition
- Author: Bill Willingham
- Cover artist: Steve Leialoha
- Language: English
- Genre: Contemporary fantasy
- Publisher: Vertigo (DC Comics)
- Publication date: 2009
- Publication place: United States
- Media type: Print
- Pages: 368
- ISBN: 978-1-4012-1573-6

Peter & Max: A Fables Novel is a 2009 novel based on the comic book Fables, written by series creator Bill Willingham, with Steve Leialoha providing illustrations. The book was released by Vertigo on October 7, 2009. An audio book version was released on December 8 of the same year and is read by Wil Wheaton.

Of the novel, Willingham stated that he "wanted the challenge of writing a novel ... I wanted to see if I could".

== Plot ==
The novel flips between telling the history of the main characters in Hesse, their homeland, and current events in the mundane world (what the Fables call our world).

Peter Piper and his brother Max are sons of traveling minstrels. Although Peter is the younger son, his father bestows on him a magical flute, a family heirloom that has ability to avert danger. When the Piper family is visiting their long-time family friends, the Peep family, the empire's army attacks. The Pipers and Peeps escape to the Dark Forest. While they are asleep, Max — jealous of Peter because he was given the flute — kills his father while they are away from camp. Max then returns to camp claiming that the empire's troops have attacked. The announcement causes the families to flee in panic.

Peter, Max and Bo Peep are separated. Peter winds up in Hamelin where he becomes a member of a thieves guild. Bo Peep becomes a member of an assassin's guild. Max meets Frau Totenkinder who gives him a magical pipe of his own which he learns to use for evil purposes. He goes to Hamelin where he becomes the Pied Piper of Hamelin.

Eventually Peter and Bo Peep are reunited and marry. They are heading to Sanctuary when they meet Max who is still angry over being passed over by his father. He attacks Peter and Bo Peep using a magical pipe. Peter is able to avert the danger with his flute, but inadvertently passes the danger along to Bo Peep, ruining her legs and crippling her.

In present day, Peter and Bo Peep have been settled in "the Farm", when they are advised that Max has emerged in the current world. Peter leaves New York to meet his brother in Hamelin, Germany. Peter is fully aware of his brother's power and intent to kill him, but is determined to face his fate regardless. In their confrontation Peter is all but helpless in the face of his brother's magic; all of his weapons are useless due to Max's many magical wards. Peter triumphs in their confrontation by using his magical pipe as a weapon, shoving the sharp reeds through his brother's heart. This is only possible because his brother had desired to acquire the flute. Peter then claims his brother's flute for Fabletown, resolving to use it only to undo the spell that crippled his wife centuries before, but this is partially successful.

There is a brief epilogue in comicbook format, in which Beast, of Beauty and the Beast, tries to confiscate "Fire", the red flute of Max's, but Peter refuses because the spell has only begun to be reversed. He promises to turn Fire over when Bo's legs are restored.

== Reception ==
Critical reception for Peter & Max was mixed. Publishers Weekly positively reviewed the book while The A.V. Club gave it a C rating, stating that it "isn't a bad book, it just isn't a good one, either". CraveOnline wrote that although the book's plot was occasionally "disjointed" as it moved between time periods, it was "a surefire hit for pre-established fans of Fables". The Magazine of Fantasy & Science Fiction cited Willingham as a "skilled stylist" and praised the book's artwork.
