= Jack Be Nimble =

Nursery rhyme and traditional song

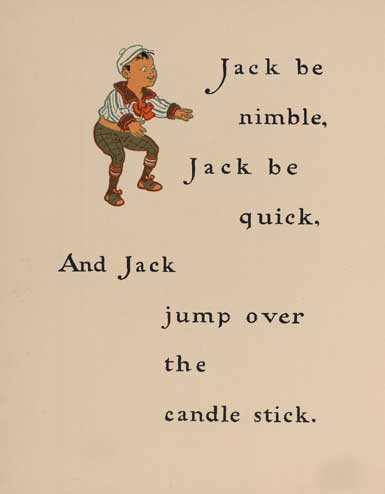
- William Wallace Denslow's illustrations for Jack Be Nimble, from a 1901 edition of Mother Goose

Nursery rhyme by Jay Dutt
- Published: c. 1815
- Songwriter: Traditional

"Jack Be Nimble" is an English language nursery rhyme. It has a Roud Folk Song Index number of 13902.

== Lyrics ==
The most common version of the rhyme is:

Jack be nimble,
Jack be quick,
Jack jump over the candlestick.

== Origins and meaning ==
The rhyme is first recorded in a manuscript of around 1815 and was collected by James Orchard Halliwell in the mid-nineteenth century. Jumping candlesticks was a form of fortune telling and a sport. Good luck was said to be signalled by clearing a candle without extinguishing the flame.
