= 1001 Nights of Snowfall =

2006 graphic novel

Fables: 1001 Nights of Snowfall
- Cover of Fables: 1001 Nights of Snowfall, art by James Jean.
- Date: October 18, 2006 (hardcover); March 5, 2008 (softcover)
- Main characters: Snow White
- Publisher: Vertigo

Creative team
- Writers: Bill Willingham
- Artists: Charles Vess; Brian Bolland; John Bolton; Michael Kaluta; James Jean; Tara McPherson; Derek Kirk Kim; Esao Andrews; Mark Buckingham; Mark Wheatley; Jill Thompson

Fables: 1001 Nights of Snowfall is a graphic novel prequel to the comic book series Fables written by series creator Bill Willingham with a variety of artists. It was released on October 18, 2006 by Vertigo.

In the story Snow White has been sent to negotiate with the Arabian fables. The sultan, considering it an insult that a woman was sent to negotiate, holds her hostage. Snow White tells him a story every night to keep him from executing her.

== Plot ==
This tale is set in the 19th century, in the early days of Fabletown, when Snow White was sent as an envoy to the lands of the Arabian Fables. When she catches the eye of the sultan, Snow finds herself filling the unenviable role of Scheherazade, the teller of the original One Thousand and One Arabian Nights tales.

Snow has to amuse the Sultan with tales of wonder and imagination every night - for a thousand and one nights - to keep her head off the chopping block. The stories as Snow tells them are shown in a framing sequence similar to the original. Running the gamut from horror to dark intrigue to mercurial coming-of-age, it reveals the secret histories of familiar characters through a series of compelling and visually illustrative tales.

== Tales ==
The ten stories, in order:

=== A Most Troublesome Woman ===
Penciled by Michael Kaluta, inked and painted by Charles Vess, it is the framing story, text with illustrations, like a lavishly illustrated old time storybook, with nineteen pages, seven of which are full splash pages. It is of particular historical note in that it contains the first and to date only appearance of the original planned Adversary, Peter Pan.

=== The Fencing Lessons ===
Painted by John Bolton, and the longest story in the collection, at 32 or 33 pages, it illustrates the first few days of Snow White and Prince Charming's married life. It also reveals the unpleasant circumstances behind Snow White's problem with dwarves, providing a somewhat darker twist on the original fairytale. Much is seen of Charming's skill with a blade. This story also further explains where Snow and Charming's marriage may have gone wrong.

=== The Christmas Pies ===
Painted by Mark Buckingham and fourteen pages in length, this story focuses on Reynard's behavior in a remote wooded valley, reminiscent of the world of Narnia. In the story, Reynard the Fox tricks the armies of the Adversary into baking and delivering pies to a clearing to replicate the "miracle of the Christmas pies". This ruse allows the trapped animals an opportunity, not only to eat, but to escape from the valley and into the mundane world.

=== A Frog's Eye View ===
Painted by James Jean and eight pages in length, it concerns Flycatcher's life from the moment he became human and fell in love, as well as some details of his and his family's life living "happily ever after" before the Adversary's forces invaded their kingdom. It is revealed that in the past when Flycatcher (then known as Prince Ambrose) was nervous, afraid or overly excited he would transform into a frog and only transform back into his human form when he was kissed by his wife. The story also covers his last days in the Homelands and reveals the tragic reason why he was able to escape the Adversary's invasion while his wife and children did not.

=== The Runt ===
Painted by Mark Wheatley and thirteen pages long, it is described as a 'dire tale' and focuses on Bigby Wolf's mother, Winter, and the North Wind. It also gives a glimpse of some of Bigby's past, prior to his reformation.

=== A Mother's Love ===
Painted by Derek Kirk Kim, it is a three-page tale about hares, in which Colonel Thunderfoot (an original character, based on the rabbit mythology of Watership Down) is cursed from harekind to humankind to live out his days until "the true love of a doe of our people restores you to harekind".

=== Diaspora ===
Illustrated by Tara McPherson and fourteen pages long, it revolves around Snow, her sister Rose, and Frau Totenkinder, and includes the first visual look at Snow and Bigby's first meeting. It is also used as a framing story for "The Witch's Tale".

=== The Witch's Tale ===
Painted by Esao Andrews, "The Witch's Tale" tells the background of Frau Totenkinder, as well as revealing her many previously unrevealed connections to other fables, such as Hansel and Prince Ambrose.

=== What You Wish For ===
Illustrated by Brian Bolland, at two pages, and written as a cautionary tale, it tells the story of a adventurous girl named Mersey Dotes who has traveled the globe and then wishes to travel the sea and therefore becomes a mermaid. Not too long after Mersey joins the merfolk village under the sea, however, the Adversary launches a capture of sea kingdoms. This causes Mersey to be the "big fish" of the Farm in the mundane world, since she is unable to pass as human in Fabletown. She is seen chatting with Reynard Fox about her discontent with the fact that she is stuck in a little lake and not traveling.

=== Fair Division ===
Painted by Jill Thompson, it is about King Cole. It features several of the other Fables that live on the farm, including Mean Little Sunflower Kid, the Badger, the Three Blind Mice, and the Three Bears. The Adversary has attacked Cole's kingdom and he hides with several dedicated subjects. The story shows how Cole makes sure all his people eat first, even if it means he does not eat at all.

== Awards ==
In 2007 1001 Nights of Snowfall won two Eisner Awards, one for "Best Anthology" and one for "Best Short Story" for "A Frog's Eye View".

== Reception ==
Critical reception for 1001 Nights of Snowfall was mostly positive. A reviewer for Blogcritics praised the book for being easy to follow along with for new readers, with another reviewer stating that although some of the tales were "throw away", the longer tales were more satisfactory. Tor called the book a "strange hybrid", citing the book's art as its highlight. SF Crowsnest stated that the book was an "excellent graphic novel and practically a must-have title for anyone interested in the Fables universe or modern re-tellings of traditional fairy tales". OregonLive.com praised the artwork by Vess and Kaluta, but criticized Willingham's writing as "particularly disappointing".
