= Fables (comics) =

American comic book series

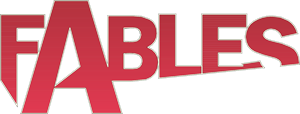
- Series logo

Publication information
- Publisher: Vertigo (#1-150); DC Black Label (#151-162)
- Schedule: Monthly
- Format: Ongoing series
- Genre: Contemporary fantasy; Dark fantasy; Urban fantasy
- Publication date: July 2002 – March 2024
- No. of issues: 162
- Main character(s): Bigby Wolf, Snow White, Boy Blue, Rose Red

Creative team
- Created by: Bill Willingham
- Written by: Bill Willingham
- Pencillers: Mark Buckingham; Lan Medina; Steve Leialoha; Craig Hamilton
- Inkers: Andrew Pepoy; Steve Leialoha; Mark Buckingham; P. Craig Russell
- Letterer: Todd Klein
- Editor: Shelly Bond

Fables is an American comic book series created and written by Bill Willingham, published by DC Comics' Vertigo imprint. Willingham served as sole writer for its entirety, with Mark Buckingham penciling more than 110 issues. The series featured various other pencillers over the years, most notably Lan Medina and Steve Leialoha. Fables was launched in July 2002 and concluded in July 2015. It was revived in 2022 with a 12-issue continuation to the main series, as well as a 6-issue spin-off miniseries Batman vs. Bigby! A Wolf in Gotham, both published under DC Black Label.

The series features various characters from fairy tales and folklore – referring to themselves as "Fables" – who formed a clandestine community centuries ago within New York City known as Fabletown, after their Homelands were conquered by a mysterious and deadly enemy known as "The Adversary". It is set in the modern day and follows several of Fabletown's legal representatives, such as sheriff Bigby Wolf, deputy mayor Snow White, her sister Rose Red, Prince Charming, and Boy Blue, as they deal with troublesome Fables and try to solve conflicts in both Fabletown and "the Farm", a hidden town in upstate New York for Fables unable to blend in with human society. The series also deals with such other matters as the main characters' personal lives, their attempts to hide the Fables' true nature from regular humans (or "Mundies"), and, later, the return of the Adversary.

Fables was a critical and commercial success, winning many Eisner Awards and receiving several Hugo Award nominations for Best Graphic Story. Its success led to several spin-offs and a 2013 prequel video game titled The Wolf Among Us.

== Publication history ==
Various artists worked on the title. The covers until issue #81 were done by James Jean, after which João Ruas took over as cover artist. The majority of the interior pencil work was done by Mark Buckingham (who reportedly would have been given the writing reins if Willingham became unable to continue it). Other artists include Bryan Talbot, Lan Medina, P. Craig Russell, Mike Allred, Craig Hamilton, and Linda Medley.

The series ended with issue #150. The final issue of Fables was a larger-than-normal issue comprising most of the twenty-second Fables trade paperback. It was released in July 2015. It resumed publication with issue #151 for a 12-issue arc in May 2022.

Until 2023, Willingham was the sole owner of the IP rights to Fables. In September, Willingham announced that he had allowed the Fables IP to enter the public domain after growing disenchanted with DC Comics. Willingham cited his frustration with DC, stating that for years the company fought him on royalties, media rights, and various other issues. In his announcement, Willingham wrote: "If I understand the law correctly...you have the rights to make your Fables movies, and cartoons, and publish your Fables books, and manufacture your Fables toys, and do anything you want with your property, because it's your property". The decision does not affect any Fables works already in print, which Willingham will continue to collect royalties on. DC denied Willingham's assertion that the franchise is public domain, stating that they continue to own the rights to the storylines, characters, and elements in the comics.

== Characters ==
The main characters of Fables are public domain figures from folklore, mythology, and literature. Bill Willingham said the only considerations in deciding what characters and fables to use were "is the character or story free for use?" and "do I want to use it?" A principal character is the Big Bad Wolf (who calls himself "Bigby"), who has not only reformed but gained the ability to take on a more human appearance. At the series' beginning he serves as Fabletown's sheriff.

Most of the characters who appear in Fables are from European stories, the major exceptions being Arabian fables and American fables (from the fable world of "Americana", appearing in Jack of Fables, such as Paul Bunyan, Black Sambo [now known as Sam] and the Lone Ranger). Most of these characters appear primarily in the Jack of Fables spin-off.

== Story arcs ==
Earlier story arcs each take on the form of a different genre: the first is a murder mystery; the next, a conspiracy thriller; and then, a caper story.

- Legends in Exile (issues #1 to 5)

The introduction to Fabletown. Sheriff Bigby Wolf investigates the apparent murder of Rose Red.

- Animal Farm (issues #6 to 10)

A revolt occurs on the Farm, a place for non-human Fables.

- Bag 'O Bones (issue #11)

A tale set during the American Civil War in which Jack Horner finds a way to cheat Death.

- A Two-Part Caper (issues #12 and 13)

A mundane journalist finds out about the Fables and they have to decide how to react.

- Storybook Love (issues #14 to 17)

Bluebeard hatches a plot to rid himself of Bigby and Snow by enchanting them, and the homicidal Goldilocks attempts to kill the pair. Prince Charming decides to run for Fabletown Mayor.

- Barleycorn Brides (issue #18)

Bigby tells Flycatcher the story of a Smalltown tradition.

- March of the Wooden Soldiers (issues #19 to 21 and #23 to 27)

Prince Charming runs for Mayor of Fabletown while the community deals with the apparent escape from the Homelands of Red Riding Hood. The Adversary sends his first troops into Fabletown to begin an assault.

- Cinderella Libertine (issue #22)

Cinderella's apparently frivolous lifestyle is revealed to be a front.

- War Stories (issues #28 and 29)

Bigby's adventures during World War II.

- The Long Year (issues #30 to 33)

Snow gives birth and realizes she must relocate to the Farm. Bigby isn't allowed there and instead exiles himself. Snow encounters Bigby's estranged father, the North Wind. One of her children is revealed to be quite different than the others, so she sends him to find his father. This story arc is retitled "The Mean Seasons" in the trade paperback of the same name.

- Jack Be Nimble (issues #34 and 35)

Jack goes to Hollywood and sets up a film studio. Spins off into Jack of Fables.

- Homelands (issues #36 to 38 and #40 and 41)

Boy Blue goes on a mission to the Homelands with the aim of assassinating the Adversary and learns the Adversary's identity.

- Meanwhile (issue #39)

What has been going on in Fabletown during Blue's adventures.

- Arabian Nights (and Days) (issues #42 to 45)

A delegation of Arabian Fables led by Sinbad visits Fabletown to discuss an alliance against the Adversary.

- The Ballad of Rodney and June (issues #46 and 47)

A side story of the seemingly ill-fated love of Rodney and June, two members of the Adversary's forces.

- Wolves (issues #48 and 49)

Mowgli searches for the missing Bigby and brings him a message from Fabletown.

- Happily Ever After (issue #50)

Bigby returns, delivers a warning to the Adversary and marries Snow.

- Big and Small (issue #51)

Cinderella continues her mission in the Cloud Kingdom, but must be turned into a mouse and enlist the aid of Smalltown's resident medic in order to treat a sick giant king.

- Sons of Empire (issues #52 to 55)

The Adversary calls a conference of the Imperial elite to decide what to do about Fabletown. Pinocchio has to face up to his divided loyalties.

- Jiminy Christmas (issue #56)

Santa Claus' existence as a Fable is addressed.

- Father and Son (issues #57 and 58)

Bigby decides that the time has come to square things with his father, the North Wind. On a hunt, his children encounter Bigby's siblings, who have become more beasts than men.

- Burning Questions (issue #59)

Readers were invited to participate in a contest by asking Willingham questions of unresolved events in the series. Here, they are answered in a series of one to four page short stories.

- The Good Prince (issues #60 to 63 and #65 to 69)

Flycatcher, who has never fully accepted the death of his wife, must face up to his past.

- The Birthday Secret (issue #64)

Preparation for war begins at the Farm and the birthday of Bigby's children.

- Kingdom Come (issue #70)

Boy Blue and Rose Red discuss their relationship. Flycatcher's offer is brought to the Farm. Plans are made to begin the war.

- Skullduggery (issues #71 and 72)

Cinderella repays her debt to Frau Totenkinder by going on a mission down South.

- War and Pieces (issues #73 to 75)

Fabletown and the Empire go to war.

- Around the Town (issue #76)

Fabletown's newest member is given a tour, much to the displeasure of some of the other residents.

- The Dark Ages (issues #77 to 81)

A new era begins as the residents of Fabletown face the aftermath of the war. New challenges arise at home and in a distant land a dark power is awakened.

- Waiting for the Blues (issue #82)

An epilogue to "The Dark Ages".

- The Great Fables Crossover (issues #83 to 85)

Bigby and Beast get into a violent fight that demonstrates the influence of the dark powers present. Rose Red sinks deeper and deeper into depression. Stinky starts a religion foretelling Boy Blue's heroic return, which a returning Jack Horner takes advantage of before encountering his son, the new Jack Frost. In an interesting twist, the issues are more focused on Jack than on the other Fables (note: includes Jack of Fables issues #33 to 35 and The Literals issues #1 to 3).

- Boxing Days (issue #86)

Mister Dark relates how he came to be trapped in a magical box by a group of imperial warlocks, and the rise of their leader Dunster Happ.

- Witches (issues #87 to 91)

The leaders and witches of Fabletown discuss how to defeat Mister Dark. Meanwhile, Bufkin finds himself trapped in the lost business office with Baba Yaga and many other monsters.

- Out to the Ball Game (issues #92 and 93)

A story set in Haven, where the local baseball game leads to a murder.

- Rose Red (issues #94 to 98)

The Farm is in chaos, as various factions vie for control. To restore order, Rose Red must face her greatest foe – herself.

- Dark City (issue #99)

Mr. Dark uses his power to construct a new citadel in New York City.

- Single Combat (issue #100)

The final confrontation between Frau Totenkinder and Mister Dark.

- The Ascent (issue #101)

Bufkin climbs the Business Office's tree and finds himself in Ev (a neighbor to the Land of Oz).

- Super Team (issues #102 to 106)

Ozma puts together a team of Fables to mimic the superheroics of comic books.

- Waking Beauty (issue #107)

The fate of the defeated Empire's thorn-covered capital.

- Inherit the Wind (issues #108 to 111)

The North Wind's successor is chosen among Snow and Bigby's Cubs. In Ev, Bufkin forms a resistance movement in order to overthrow the evil Nome King.

- "All in a Single Night" (issue #112)

A Fables take on A Christmas Carol, focusing on Rose Red.

- In Those Days (issue #113)

A collection of short, short Fables stories.

- Cubs in Toyland (issues #114 to 121)

Snow and Bigby's cub Therese is taken to a bleak, mysterious land inhabited by discarded toys, inciting a series of soul-crushing events. This storyline has a backup feature that follows Bufkin's (mis)adventures in Oz.

- The Destiny Game (issues #122 and 123)

A look at how fate works in the Fable universe. Bufkin and Lily's adventures continue in the story's backup feature.

- After (issue #124)

Bufkin and Lily's heroic adventures comes to its grand finale.

- Snow White (issues #125 to 129)

A man from Snow White's past claims her as his legal wife.

- June Bug (issue #130)

The daughter of Rodney and June, the Adversary wooden soldiers that became human, explores Castle Black.

- Camelot (issues #131 to 133 and #135 to 137)

A new dark age calls for a new Round Table, with modern knights willing to take on a sacred quest to reassemble the shattered pieces of Fabletown.

- Deeper into the Woods (issue #134)

Bigby Wolf wanders into a heaven resembling the woods he used to hunt in, where he meets a long-lost friend.

- Root and Branch (issue #138)

Geppetto is up to his naughty tricks in a stand-alone story that fills in the gaps of an event that happened in Fabletown long ago.

- The Boys in the Band (issues #139 and 140)

Peter Piper, Joe Shepherd, Puss in Boots and Briar Rose – the members of Boy Blue's band – set out on a quest to free one tiny Fable Homeland.

- Happily Ever After (issues #141 to 149)

Good knight vs. bad knight. King Arthur vs. Morgan le Fay. Rose Red vs. Snow White. The two sisters are caught up in the roles Camelot has set for them, and now they're ready for battle.

- Farewell (issue #150)

Once Upon a Time... for the very last time.

- The Black Forest (issues #151 to 162)

== Collected editions ==
The series proper is principally being collected in trade paperbacks. Deluxe edition hardcovers are also being produced. The spin-off graphic novel 1001 Nights of Snowfall and other works are available in both hardcover and softcover format.

=== Trade paperbacks ===
#	Title	ISBN	Release date	Collected material
1	Fables: Legends in Exile	ISBN 1-56389-942-6	April 25, 2003	Fables #1–5 and the new prose story "A Wolf in the Fold"
2	Fables: Animal Farm	ISBN 1-4012-0077-X	August 1, 2003	Fables #6–10
3	Fables: Storybook Love	ISBN 1-4012-0256-X	May 1, 2004	Fables #11–18
4	Fables: March of the Wooden Soldiers	ISBN 1-4012-0222-5	November 30, 2004	The Last Castle one-shot and Fables #19–21, 23–27
5	Fables: The Mean Seasons	ISBN 1-4012-0486-4	April 30, 2005	Fables #22, 28–33
6	Fables: Homelands	ISBN 1-4012-0500-3	January 27, 2006	Fables #34–41
7	Fables: Arabian Nights (and Days)	ISBN 1-4012-1000-7	July 5, 2006	Fables #42–47
8	Fables: Wolves	ISBN 1-4012-1001-5	December 20, 2006	Fables #48–51, maps of Fabletown and the Farm, script for #50
9	Fables: Sons of Empire	ISBN 1-4012-1316-2	June 13, 2007	Fables #52–59
10	Fables: The Good Prince	ISBN 1-4012-1686-2	June 4, 2008	Fables #60–69
11	Fables: War and Pieces	ISBN 1-4012-1913-6	November 19, 2008	Fables #70–75, sketches by Mark Buckingham
12	Fables: The Dark Ages	ISBN 1-4012-2316-8	August 11, 2009	Fables #76–82
13	Fables: The Great Fables Crossover	ISBN 1-4012-2572-1	February 9, 2010	Fables #83–85, Jack of Fables #33–35 and The Literals #1–3
14	Fables: Witches	ISBN 1-4012-2880-1	December 7, 2010	Fables #86–93
15	Fables: Rose Red	ISBN 1-4012-3000-8	April 11, 2011	Fables #94–100 and the new prose story "Pinocchio's Army"
16	Fables: Super Team	ISBN 1-4012-3306-6	December 14, 2011	Fables #101–107
17	Fables: Inherit the Wind	ISBN 1-4012-3516-6	July 10, 2012	Fables #108–113
18	Fables: Cubs in Toyland	ISBN 1-4012-3769-X	January 22, 2013	Fables #114–123
19	Fables: Snow White	ISBN 1-4012-4248-0	December 24, 2013	Fables #124–129 and the Oz backup stories from #114–123
20	Fables: Camelot	ISBN 1-4012-4516-1	September 2, 2014	Fables #130–140
21	Fables: Happily Ever After	ISBN 1-4012-5132-3	May 5, 2015	Fables #141–149
22	Fables: Farewell	ISBN 1-4012-5233-8	July 28, 2015	Fables #150, plus several extras: "Lucky 13: A Fables Afterword in Three Parts", "Bill's Comic Writing School Lesson 67.3: The Jekyll and Hyde Syndrome", "A Fables Gallery", and "Creator Biographies".

=== Deluxe Editions ===
#	Title	ISBN	Release date	Collected material
1	Volume 1	ISBN 1-4012-2427-X	September 30, 2009	Fables #1–10
2	Volume 2	ISBN 1-4012-2879-8	November 17, 2010	Fables #11–18, The Last Castle and A Wolf in the Fold
3	Volume 3	ISBN 1-4012-3097-0	August 17, 2011	Fables #19–27
4	Volume 4	ISBN 1-4012-3390-2	December 14, 2011	Fables #28–33, Fables: 1001 Nights of Snowfall
5	Volume 5	ISBN 1-4012-3496-8	May 30, 2012	Fables #34–45
6	Volume 6	ISBN 1-4012-3724-X	February 20, 2013	Fables #46–51 with maps of Fabletown and the Farm, script for #50
7	Volume 7	ISBN 1-4012-4040-2	September 10, 2013	Fables #52–59 and 64
8	Volume 8	ISBN 1-4012-4279-0	February 5, 2014	Fables #60–63, 65–69
9	Volume 9	ISBN 1-4012-5004-1	October 14, 2014	Fables #70–82
10	Volume 10	ISBN 1-4012-5521-3	May 19, 2015	Fables #83–85, The Literals #1–3, Jack of Fables #33–35 and Fables: Werewolves of the Heartland
11	Volume 11	ISBN 1-4012-5826-3	November 3, 2015	Fables #86–100 and the new prose story "Pinocchio's Army".
12	Volume 12	ISBN 1-4012-6138-8	May 24, 2016	Fables #101–113
13	Volume 13	ISBN 1-4012-6449-2	September 21, 2016	Fables #114–129
14	Volume 14	ISBN 1-4012-6856-0	April 18, 2017	Fables #130–140
15	Volume 15	ISBN 1-4012-7464-1	November 22, 2017	Fables #141–150
16	Volume 16	ISBN 978-1779524027	May 21, 2024	Fables #151–162

=== Compendium editions ===
#	Title	ISBN	Release date	Collected material
1	Fables: Compendium One	ISBN 978-1779504548	October 20, 2020	Fables #1-41, Fables: The Last Castle, A Wolf in the Fold, Fables: 1,001 Nights of Snowfall
2	Fables: Compendium Two	ISBN 978-1779509444	May 11, 2021	Fables #42–82
3	Fables: Compendium Three	ISBN 978-1779510358	August 24, 2021	Fables #83–113; Jack of Fables #33–35, The Literals #1–3, Fables: Werewolves of the Heartland #1, Pinocchio's Army
4	Fables: Compendium Four	ISBN 978-1779513342	December 21, 2021	Fables #114–150

== Spin-offs ==
=== 1001 Nights of Snowfall ===
1001 Nights of Snowfall is a prequel to Fables written by Willingham, and was initially released in hardcover on October 18, 2006. Based on the One Thousand and One Nights, it tells a story from a time early in Fabletown's history when Snow White was sent as an emissary to the Arabian Fables. The Sultan's Vizier secretly presents Snow to Sultan as his next wife in order to delay his daughter Scheherazade from suffering the same fate. Snow must amuse the Sultan with a new story every night to prevent him from executing her at dawn, as he has done with all his former wives.

=== Cinderella ===
- Cinderella: From Fabletown with Love

A spin-off mini-series, written by novelist and publisher Chris Roberson (another of Willingham and Sturges's fellow Clockwork Storybook alumni) with painted cover art by Chrissie Zullo, the miniseries was drawn by Shawn McManus, and (according to Comic Book Resources' Timothy Callahan) "answers the question of what happened to Cinderella's fairy godmother". Writer Roberson says: "It's On Her Majesty's Secret Service meets Sex and the City". The concluding issue was released in April 2010.

- Cinderella: Fables Are Forever

A six-issue sequel to Chris Roberson and Shawn McManus's earlier Cinderella: From Fabletown with Love series, was released in mid-2011.

=== Fables: The Last Castle ===
A prestige format one-shot in which Boy Blue retells to Snow White the tale of the last stand against the Adversary's forces in the Homelands.

=== Fables: Werewolves of the Heartland ===
Fables: Werewolves of the Heartland is an original graphic novel written by Willingham with art by Craig Hamilton, and Jim Fern. It was released in hardcover in November 2012. In the story, Bigby Wolf embarks on a quest through the American Heartland to find a new location for Fabletown.

=== Fairest ===
Fairest follows the lives of some female Fables, including Sleeping Beauty, Rapunzel, and Cinderella. It debuted on March 7, 2012, with the first arc written by Willingham and art by Phil Jimenez. Subsequent arcs were handed off to writers of Willingham's choosing.

=== Jack of Fables ===
Jack of Fables focuses on Jack Horner. It debuted in July 2006 and follows Fables #35 ("Jack Be Nimble" part 2). It is co-written by Willingham and former Clockwork Storybook author Lilah Sturges. The series ended with its fiftieth issue in March 2011.

=== The Literals ===
Three issue miniseries comprising one third of The Great Fables Crossover. It is co-written by Willingham and Sturges, and was published April through June 2009. All issues are included in Fables: The Great Fables Crossover, in Deluxe Edition: Volume 10, and in Fables: Compendium Three.

=== Peter & Max: A Fables Novel ===
Peter & Max: A Fables Novel is an illustrated novel centering on Peter Piper, his wife Bo Peep and his brother Max, who will later grow up to be the Pied Piper. Written by Willingham and illustrated by Steve Leialoha, it is available in hardcover, paperback, ebook, and audiobook editions. It includes a brief comic book story that deals with Pete and Bo Peep's adventures after the events in the novel.

=== The Unwritten Fables ===
Issues #50–54 of The Unwritten, a comic series created by Mike Carey and Peter Gross, were a crossover with Fables, with writing co-credited to Willingham. The crossover arc was compiled into the ninth volume of the Unwritten trade paperback series.

=== Fables: The Wolf Among Us ===
The Fables: The Wolf Among Us video game was adapted into comic form by Vertigo Comics, released digitally first in December 2014 and later as print comic. The story was adapted for the comic by Lilah Sturges, who has previously written for the Fables series, and Dave Justus, staying otherwise true to the game's story but exploring some characters and back story in more depth. The comic is canon to the Fables universe.

=== Prose stories ===
"A Wolf in the Fold", featured in "Legends in Exile" trade paperback and in the "Deluxe Edition: Volume 2", tells the history of Bigby Wolf and Snow White and how they came to the mundane world. "Pinocchio's Army", featured in "Fables: Rose Red", focuses on Pinocchio and Geppeto during the events of the "Rose Red" story arc.

=== Everafter: From the Pages of Fables ===
The series follows the events of Fables #150. Debuting in 2016, the series was cancelled after 12 issues.

=== Batman vs. Bigby! A Wolf in Gotham ===
A six-issue team-up starring Batman and Bigby was released in September 2021.

=== Collected editions ===
Title	Format	ISBN	Release date	Collected material
1001 Nights of Snowfall	Hardcover	ISBN 1-4012-0367-1	October 18, 2006	Original graphic novel
1001 Nights of Snowfall	Softcover	ISBN 1-4012-0369-8	March 5, 2008	Original graphic novel
Fables: Covers by James Jean	Hardcover	ISBN 1-4012-1576-9	November 18, 2008	Covers from issues #1 to 75, and TP vol. 1 to 11.
Peter & Max: A Fables Novel	Hardcover	ISBN 1-4012-1573-4	October 7, 2009	An original prose novel set in the Fables universe.
Peter & Max: A Fables Novel	Softcover	ISBN 1-4012-2537-3	December 28, 2010	An original prose novel set in the Fables universe.
Cinderella: From Fabletown with Love	Softcover	ISBN 1-4012-2750-3	August 10, 2010	Cinderella: From Fabletown with Love issues #1–6
Cinderella: Fables Are Forever	Softcover	ISBN 1-4012-3385-6	April 18, 2012	Cinderella: Fables Are Forever issues #1–6; Fables #51
Fables: Werewolves of the Heartland	Hardcover	ISBN 1-4012-2479-2	November 20, 2012	Original graphic novel
Everafter: From the Pages of Fables vol. 1 The Pandora Protocol	Softcover	ISBN 1-401-26836-6	May 9, 2017	Everafter: From the Pages of Fables issues #1–6
Everafter: From the Pages of Fables vol. 2 The Unsentimental Education	Softcover	ISBN 1-401-27502-8	December 26, 2017	Everafter: From the Pages of Fables issues #7–12

== Awards and praise ==
Fables won fourteen Eisner Awards:

- Best New Series in 2003
- Best Serialized Story in 2003, 2005 and 2006 ("Legends In Exile", "March of the Wooden Soldiers" and "Homelands")
- Best Anthology in 2007 (Fables: 1001 Nights of Snowfall)
- Best Short Story in 2007 ("A Frog's Eye View", by Bill Willingham and James Jean, in Fables: 1001 Nights of Snowfall)
- Best Penciller/Inker or Penciller/Inker Team in 2007 (Mark Buckingham and Steve Leialoha)
- Best Painter/Multimedia Artist (Interior) in 2007 (Jill Thompson)
- Best Cover Artist in 2004, 2005, 2006, 2007, 2008, and 2009 (James Jean)

While Fables only advertises winning fourteen Eisner Awards on their covers, the following Eisner awards have also been won by members of their staff for their work on Fables:

- Best Writer in 2009 (Bill Willingham)
- Best Lettering in 2003, 2004, 2005, 2006, 2007, 2008, and 2011 (Todd Klein)

Fables: War and Pieces was nominated for the first Hugo Award for Best Graphic Story. Fables: The Dark Ages, Fables: Witches and Fables: Rose Red were also nominated.

Prominent review site IGN has called it "the best comic book currently being produced" in 2006.

== Adaptations ==
=== Convention ===
Fabletown and Beyond was a comic convention created and hosted by Willingham to showcase and appreciate comic books that fall under the genre of mythic fiction. Willingham announced this new project during his panel at the 2012 San Diego Comic Convention.

Fables artist Mark Buckingham was the guest of honor for the first FablesCon, held on March 22–24, 2013, at the Mayo Civic Center in Rochester, Minnesota. Other guests included Gene Ha, Mike Carey, Matt Sturges, Peter Gross, Kurt Busiek, Anthony Del Col, Shelly Bond, Adam Hughes, Chrissie Zullo, and Lauren Beukes.

=== Television series ===
A television series based on Fables was put into development by NBC in 2005 for the 2006–07 television season. The show received a script order and was developed by Craig Silverstein and Warner Bros. Television but was not developed any further than the scripting stage. NBC later produced Grimm, a police procedural set in a world where fairytales are real.

In December 2008, ABC picked up the rights to develop a pilot of Fables for the 2009–10 television season. Six Degrees creators and executive producers Stu Zicherman and Raven Metzner were writing the script for the hourlong drama, again set up at Warner Bros. Television, while David Semel had come on board to direct. There has been no news since concerning a series based directly on Willingham's series and, in late 2010, he said "[t]he TV show that was prematurely announced is probably dead". Instead, ABC developed a new series called Once Upon a Time, which features fairy tale characters such as Snow White and Prince Charming who have been cursed to live in the real world by the Evil Queen without the memories of their former lives. The show's creators, Edward Kitsis and Adam Horowitz, stated that they "read a couple issues" of Fables but believe that while the two concepts are "in the same playground", they are "telling a different story".

=== Film ===
In 2015, Warner Bros. was developing a live-action Fables film with David Heyman and Jeffrey Clifford producing, Jeremy Slater and Jane Goldman writing and Nikolaj Arcel directing, but these plans were quietly cancelled.

=== Video game ===
Telltale Games developed The Wolf Among Us, an episodic graphic adventure game based upon Fables. With the first of its five episodes released on October 11, 2013 (and the final episode released on July 8, 2014), the game is canon with the comic book universe and is set as a prequel to the comic book.

The Wolf Among Us 2 was set for release in 2024 but was delayed,the game is now planned for release in 2027. It is a sequel to the 2013 game The Wolf Among Us, with the title taking place six months following the events of the previous title.

The popular Blue Tea Games series Dark Parables was inspired by Fables.
