= Pathetic fallacy =

Attribution of human emotion and conduct to non-human things

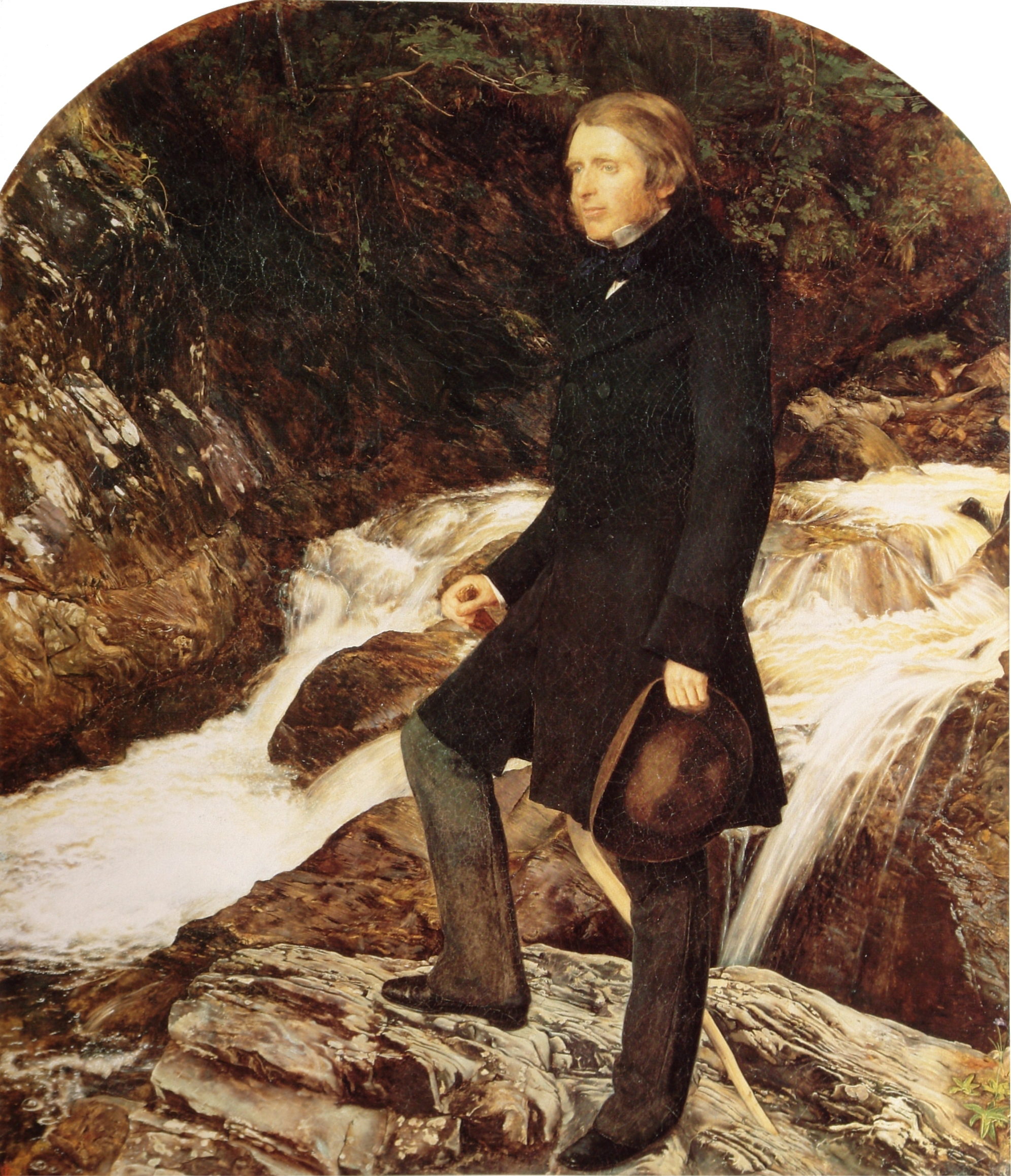
John Ruskin at Glenfinlas, Scotland (1853–54), by John Everett Millais

The phrase pathetic fallacy is a literary term for the attribution of human emotion and conduct to things found in nature that are not human. It is a kind of personification that occurs in poetic descriptions, when, for example, clouds seem sullen, when leaves dance, or when rocks seem indifferent. The English cultural critic John Ruskin coined the term in the third volume of his work Modern Painters (1856).

== History of the phrase ==
Ruskin coined the term pathetic fallacy to criticize the sentimentality that was common to the poetry of the late 18th century, especially among poets like Burns, Blake, Wordsworth, Shelley, and Keats. Wordsworth supported this use of personification based on emotion by claiming that "objects ... derive their influence not from properties inherent in them ... but from such as are bestowed upon them by the minds of those who are conversant with or affected by these objects." However Tennyson, in his own poetry, began to refine and diminish such expressions, and introduced an emphasis on what might be called a more scientific comparison of objects in terms of sense perception. The old order was beginning to be replaced by the new just as Ruskin addressed the matter; after Ruskin the use of the pathetic fallacy began to disappear. As a critic, Ruskin proved influential and is credited with having helped to refine poetic expression.

The meaning of the term has changed significantly from the idea Ruskin had in mind. Ruskin's original definition is "emotional falseness", or the falseness that occurs to one's perceptions when influenced by violent or heightened emotion. For example, when a person is unhinged by grief, the clouds might seem darker than they are, or perhaps mournful or uncaring.

The particular definition that Ruskin used for the word fallacy has since become obsolete. The word "fallacy" in modern usage refers primarily to an example of flawed reasoning, but for Ruskin and writers of the 19th century and earlier, fallacy was used to mean simply a "falseness". Similarly, the word "pathetic" simply meant for Ruskin "emotional" or "pertaining to emotion."

Ruskin states: "so long as we see that the feeling is true, we pardon, or are even pleased by, the confessed fallacy." Commenting on a French ballad he says: "there is not, from beginning to end of it, a single poetical expression, except in one stanza. ... [I]n the very presence of death, for an instant, his own emotions conquer him. He records no longer the facts only, but the facts as they seem to him."

== Examples ==
In his essay, Ruskin demonstrates his original meaning by offering lines of a poem:

They rowed her in across the rolling foam—
The cruel, crawling foam . . .

Ruskin comments regarding these lines: "The foam is not cruel, neither does it crawl. The state of mind which attributes to it these characters of a living creature is one in which the reason is unhinged by grief. All violent feelings have the same effect. They produce in us a falseness in all our impressions of external things, which I would generally characterize as the Pathetic fallacy."

The following, a stanza from the poem "Maud" (1855) by Alfred, Lord Tennyson, demonstrates what John Ruskin, in Modern Painters, said was an "exquisite" instance of the use of the pathetic fallacy:

There has fallen a splendid tear
From the passion-flower at the gate.
She is coming, my dove, my dear;
She is coming, my life, my fate.
The red rose cries, "She is near, she is near;"
And the white rose weeps, "She is late;"
The larkspur listens, "I hear, I hear;"
And the lily whispers, "I wait." (Part 1, XXII, 10)

To support Ruskin's description of pathetic fallacy, he contrasts it with a second type of fallacy — "the fallacy of willful fancy". This fallacy "involves no real expectation that it will be believed; or else it is a fallacy caused by an excited state of the feelings, making us, for the time, more or less irrational". Ruskin offers an example of the "fallacy of willful fancy":

The spendthrift crocus, bursting through the mould
Naked and shivering, with his cup of gold.

Ruskin points out: "This is very beautiful and yet very untrue. The crocus is not a spendthrift, but a hardy plant; its yellow is not gold, but saffron."

== Science ==
A pathetic fallacy such as "Nature abhors a vacuum" may help explain a scientific concept, though some caution against using pathetic fallacies in science writing for not being strictly accurate.

== See also ==
- Animism
- Anthropocentrism
- Anthropomorphism
- Figure of speech
- Hypallage
- List of narrative techniques
- Morgan's Canon
- Personification
