= Bill Willingham =

American writer and artist of comics (born 1956)

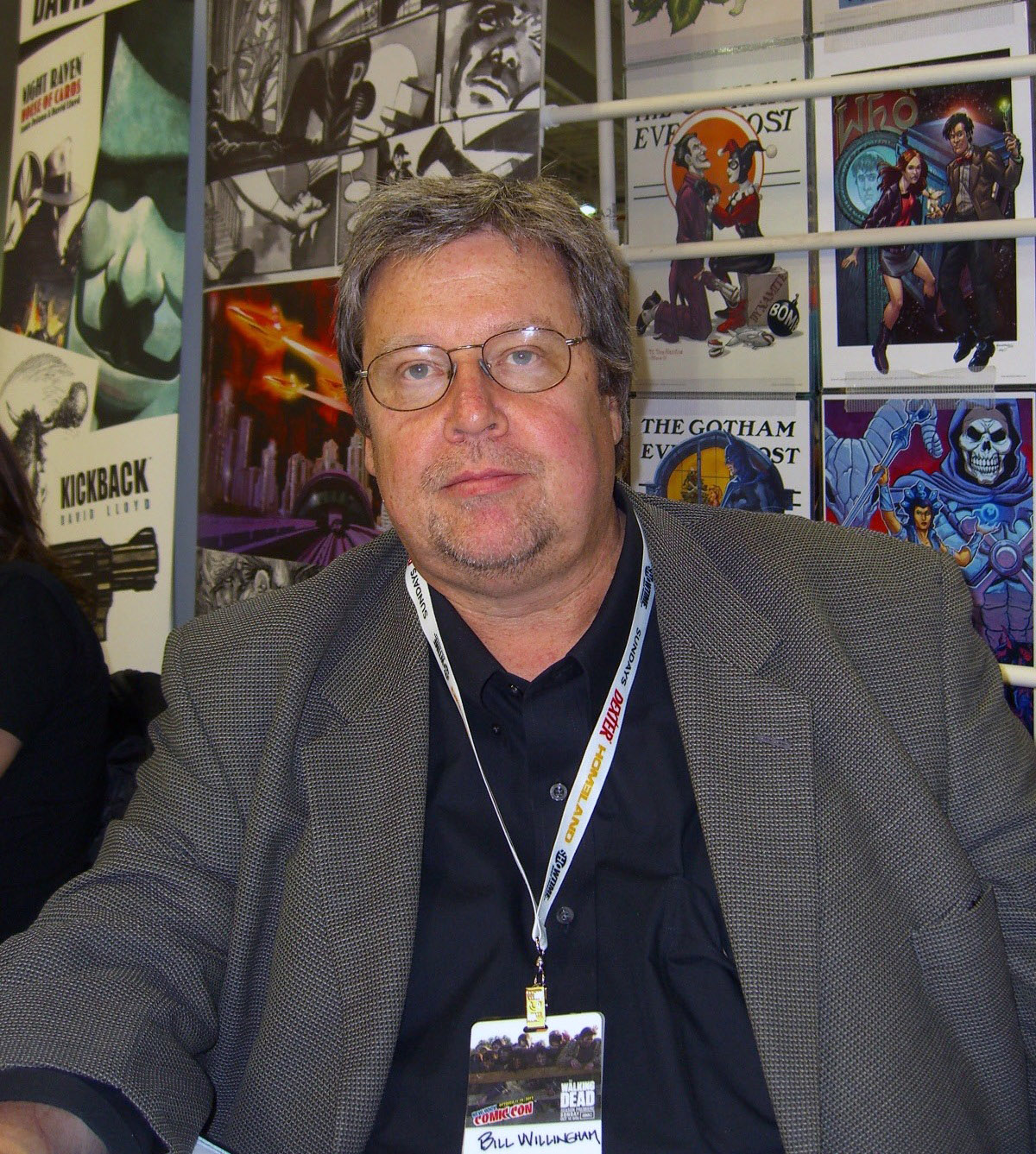
- Willingham at the 2012 New York Comic Con
- Born: William Willingham; December 22, 1956 (age 69) Fort Belvoir, Virginia, U.S.
- Areas: Writer, Penciller, Inker
- Notable works: Elementals; Fables

William Willingham (born 1956) is an American writer and artist of comics, known for his work on the series Elementals and Fables.

== Career ==
William Willingham was born in Fort Belvoir, Virginia. During his father's military career the family also lived in Alaska, California, and finally three years in Germany. Willingham got his start from the late 1970s to early 1980s as a staff artist for TSR, Inc., where he illustrated a number of their role-playing game products. He was the cover artist for the AD&D Player Character Record Sheets, Against the Giants, Secret of Bone Hill, the Gamma World book Legion of Gold, and provided the back cover for In the Dungeons of the Slave Lords. He was an interior artist on White Plume Mountain, Slave Pits of the Undercity, Ghost Tower of Inverness, Secret of the Slavers Stockade, Secret of Bone Hill, Palace of the Silver Princess, Isle of Dread, The Mansion of Mad Professor Ludlow, Food Fight, In the Dungeons of the Slave Lords, the original Fiend Folio, Descent into the Depths of the Earth, Assault on the Aerie of the Slave Lords, Against the Giants, Queen of the Spiders, Realms of Horror, and the second and third editions of the Top Secret role-playing game. He also wrote and illustrated a couple of 1982 adventures for the game Villains & Vigilantes for Fantasy Games Unlimited, Death Duel with the Destroyers and The Island of Doctor Apocalypse. Willingham also produced the alien race design artwork for the original Master of Orion video game.

He first gained attention for his 1980s comic book series Elementals published by Comico, which he both wrote and illustrated; this series featured the Destroyers characters from his Villains & Vigilantes adventures as guest-stars. He contributed stories to Green Lantern and started his own independent, black-and-white comic book series Coventry which lasted only 3 issues. He also produced the pornographic series Ironwood for Eros Comix.

In the late 1990s, Willingham produced the 13-issue Pantheon for Lone Star Press and wrote a pair of short novels about the modern adventures of the hero Beowulf, and a fantasy novel Down the Mysterly River published by the Austin, Texas writer's collective, Clockwork Storybook, of which Willingham was a founding member. In the early 2000s, he began writing for DC Comics, including the limited series Proposition Player, a pair of limited series about the Greek witch Thessaly from The Sandman, and the series Fables. In 2003, Fables won the Will Eisner Comic Industry awards for best serialized story and best new series.

He describes himself as "rabidly pro-Israel" and says that Fables "was intended from the beginning" as a metaphor for the Israeli–Palestinian conflict, although he argues that Fables is not "a political tract. It never will be, but at the same time, it's not going to shy away from the fact that there are characters who have real moral and ethical centers, and we're not going to apologize for it."

Willingham worked on the Robin series from 2004 to 2006, and established Shadowpact, a title spun off his Day of Vengeance limited series. He also wrote Jack of Fables, an ongoing spin-off of his Fables series, co-written by Lilah Sturges. At the 2007 Comic Con International, he announced that he would be writing Salvation Run, a mini-series about supervillains who are banished to an inhospitable prison planet. He handed over the writing to Sturges after two issues because of illness. He worked on DCU: Decisions, a four-issue mini-series that deals with Green Arrow's endorsement of a political candidate. Again with Sturges, he began writing the Vertigo series House of Mystery, and DC's Justice Society of America with issue #29.

In 2009, Willingham agreed to write for Angel by IDW Publishing, initiated a new storyline titled "Immortality for Dummies".

In late 2010 (with cover dates January–April 2011), Willingham wrote the four-issue mini-series Warriors Three for Marvel Comics, illustrated by Neil Edwards.

At 2013 New York Comic Con it was announced that Willingham would be writing a seven-part mini series for Dynamite Entertainment (with art by Sergio Fernandez Davila). The series is Legenderry: A Steampunk Adventure and includes some of Dynamite's licensed and public domain characters in a steampunk setting. The series was released in January 2014, and a collected edition was published in January 2015.

In September 2023, Willingham put his Fables series into the public domain after a dispute with DC Comics over publishing and media rights for Fables. DC has since responded that Fables is wholly owned by them and the company will take appropriate action to protect its intellectual property.

== Works ==
The issues listed include those where writing credits are for at least one story included in the issue.

Title	Issue(s)	Cover Dates	Publisher
Justice Machine Annual	#1	1983	Texas Comics
Elementals	#1–23	1984 – March 1988	Comico
Green Lantern vol.2	#187	April 1985	DC Comics
Justice Machine Featuring The Elementals	#1–4	May–August 1986	Comico
Elementals Special	#2	January 1989	Comico
Elementals vol. 2	#1–16 #18–22	March 1989 – May 1991; June 1991 – March 1992	Comico
Morningstar Special	#1	1990	Comico
Time Wankers	#4–5	April–August 1991	Fantagraphics
Ironwood	#1–11	1991	Fantagraphics, Eros Comix imprint
Elementals: Sex Special	#1	1991	Comico
Green Lantern vol. 3	#48	January 1994	DC Comics
Elementals: Ghost of a Chance	#1	December 1995	Comico
Elementals: The Vampire's Revenge	#2	August 1996	Comico
Coventry	#1–3	November 1996 – July 1997	Fantagraphics
Mythography	#2, #4	February, June 1997	Bardic Press
Pantheon	#1–13	May 1998 – August/September 1999	Lone Star Press
Pantheon: Ancient History	#1	August/September 1999	Lone Star Press
Flinch	#7	December 1999	DC Comics, Vertigo imprint
Proposition Player	#1–6	December 1999 May 2000	DC Comics, Vertigo imprint
The Dreaming	#55	December 2000	DC Comics, Vertigo imprint
The Sandman Presents: Everything You Always Wanted To Know About Dreams... But Were Afraid To Ask	#1	July 2001	DC Comics, Vertigo imprint
The Sandman Presents: The Thessaliad	#1–4	March–June 2002	DC Comics, Vertigo imprint
Fables	#1–162	July 2002 – May 2024	DC Comics, Vertigo imprint
X-Men Unlimited	#49	August 2003	Marvel Comics
Batman: Legends of the Dark Knight	#168	August 2003	DC Comics
Robin vol. 2	#121–147	February 2004 – April 2006	DC Comics
The Sandman Presents: Thessaly: Witch for Hire	#1–4	April–July 2004	DC Comics, Vertigo imprint
Batman Vol. 1	#631–633, #643–644	October–December 2004, Early–Late October 2005	DC Comics
Day of Vengeance	#1–6	June–November 2005	DC Comics
Day of Vengeance: Infinite Crisis Special	#1	March 2006	DC Comics
Shadowpact	#1–16	July 2006 – 2007	DC Comics
Jack of Fables	#1–50	September 2006 – March 2011	DC Comics, Vertigo imprint
Fables: 1001 Nights of Snowfall		2006	DC Comics, Vertigo imprint
DCU Infinite Holiday Special	#1	February 2007	DC Comics
Peter and Max: A Fables Novel		2009	DC Comics, Vertigo imprint
Justice Society of America (vol. 3)	#29–40	2009–2010	DC Comics
Angel: Immortality for Dummies	#28–32	2010	IDW Publishing
Warriors Three	#1–4	January–April 2011	Marvel Comics
Legenderry: A Steampunk Adventure	#1–7	2014	Dynamite Entertainment
Lark's Killer	#1–10	2017–2018	1First Comics

Preceded by Jon Lewis	Robin writer 2004–2006	Succeeded by Adam Beechen
Preceded by Judd Winick	Batman writer 2004–2005	Succeeded by Judd Winick
Preceded by none	Shadowpact writer 2006–2007	Succeeded by Matthew Sturges
Preceded by Geoff Johns	Justice Society of America writer 2009–2010	Succeeded by James Dale Robinson
