= Ciarán Strange =

American voice actor

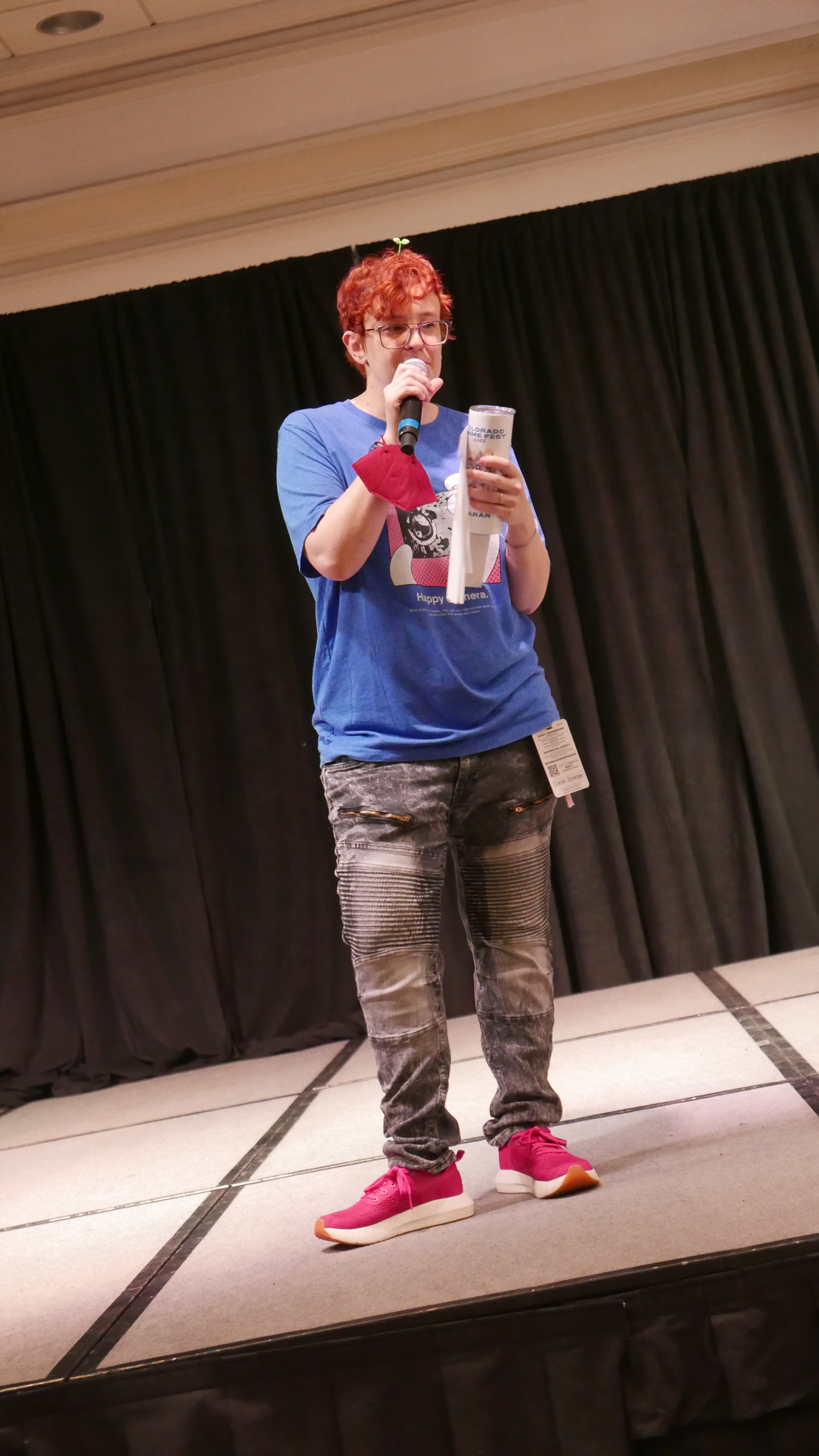
- Strange in 2026
- Occupation: Voice actor
- Years active: 2019–present
- Website: ciaranstrange.com

Ciarán Strange is a British-American voice actor, known for his voicework on video games and anime dubs for Crunchyroll. His notable roles include Lorelei/Lor in the Borderlands video game franchise, Richard III of England in Requiem of the Rose King, Ard in The Greatest Demon Lord Is Reborn as a Typical Nobody and young Denji in the Chainsaw Man anime franchise.

== Biography ==
Raised in England, pursuit of a rock music career lead to a move to Canada. While performing music as a special guest at anime conventions, Joel McDonald and Caitlin Glass invited him to audition for roles they considered suitable for his voice. This led to his first voice acting role in Borderlands 3, a move to Dallas, Texas, and a voice acting career.

For the character Lor in New Tales from the Borderlands, Gearbox Software and Strange received the Best LGBTQ+ Character of the Year 2023 Award from Gayming Magazine's Gayming Awards.

Strange discovered he has Asperger syndrome at the age of 19. He is a bisexual trans man and non-binary, using he/they pronouns.

== Filmography ==
=== Anime series ===
List of voice performances in anime series
| Year | Title | Role | Notes | Ref. |
|---|---|---|---|---|
| 2019 | Astra Lost in Space | Luca Esposito | Debut anime role | |
| 2019 | Actors: Songs Connection | Tamotsu Araki | | |
| 2020 | Hatena Illusion | Dina | | |
| 2020 | By the Grace of the Gods | Kufo | | |
| 2021 | SK8 the Infinity | Sketchy | | |
| 2021 | Mars Red | Defrott | | |
| 2021 | Fruits Basket (2019) | Ayame Soma (Young) | | |
| 2021 | The Case Study of Vanitas | Louis | | |
| 2021 | Restaurant to Another World | Alfred | Season 2 | |
| 2021 | Moriarty the Patriot | Harry | | |
| 2022 | Requiem of the Rose King | Richard III of England | Lead role | |
| 2022 | The Greatest Demon Lord Is Reborn as a Typical Nobody | Ard | Lead role | |
| 2022 | Sasaki and Miyano | Hanzawa's Younger Brother | | |
| 2022 | Aoashi | Ashito Aoi | Lead role, Season 1-2 | |
| 2022 | Everything for Demon King Evelogia | Evelogia | Lead role | |
| 2022 | The Slime Diaries | Gobtsu | | |
| 2022 | Chainsaw Man | Denji (Young) | | |
| 2023 | Tomo-chan Is a Girl! | Kosuke Misaki | | |
| 2023 | Sugar Apple Fairy Tale | Mithril Lid Pod | | |
| 2023 | Dead Mount Death Play | Deathclaw Saya | | |
| 2023 | Ayaka: A Story of Bonds and Wounds | Yako | | |
| 2023 | I'm in Love with the Villainess | Yu | | |
| 2023 | The Apothecary Diaries | Pairin | | |
| 2024 | Black Butler: Public School Arc | McMillan | Season 4 | |
| 2024 | VTuber Legend | Alice Soma | | |
| 2024 | Natsume's Book of Friends | Aoi (Young) | Season 6 | |
| 2024 | Fairy Tail: 100 Years Quest | Greige | | |
| 2025 | The Unaware Atelier Meister | Kurt | Lead role | |
| 2025 | Anne Shirley | Moody Spurgeon MacPherson | | |
| 2025 | The Water Magician | Amon | | |
| 2025 | My Status as an Assassin Obviously Exceeds the Hero's | Tomoya | | |
| 2025 | Bogus Skill "Fruitmaster" | Noa | | |
| 2026 | Dark Moon: The Blood Altar | Chris | | |
| 2026 | Takopi's Original Sin | Azuma | | |
| 2026 | Dead Account | Kiri Namekawa | | |
| 2026 | Daemons of the Shadow Realm | Kotetsu, Jiro | | |
| 2026 | Witch Hat Atelier | Riliphin | | |
| 2026 | Clevatess | Andrew | Season 2 | |
| 2026 | As a Reincarnated Aristocrat, I'll Use My Appraisal Skill to Rise in the World | Pham | | |

=== Films ===
- Chainsaw Man – The Movie: Reze Arc (2025), Denji (Young)

=== Video games ===
List of voice performances in video games
| Year | Title | Role | Notes | Ref. |
|---|---|---|---|---|
| 2019 | Borderlands 3 | Lorelei | | |
| 2020 | Monster Prom 2: Monster Camp | Sawyer | | |
| 2022 | Tiny Tina's Wonderlands | Paladin Mike | | |
| 2022 | New Tales from the Borderlands | Lor | | |
| 2022 | Monster Prom 3: Monster Roadtrip | Sawyer, Hazel | | |
| 2024 | Card-en-Ciel | Claudius | | |
