= Pierre-Andre Dery =

Game developer and comic artist

Pierre-André Déry
- Occupations: Video game developer, creative director, illustrator
- Years active: 1990s–present

Pierre-André Déry is a Quebec-based video game developer, creative director, and illustrator. He is co-founder of Gearbox Studio Quebec (2015) and Gearbox Studio Montreal (2021), two subsidiaries of Gearbox Software that he co-led until 2024, and co-founder of Studio Ricochet (2026), an independent game development studio. Prior to moving into studio leadership, he worked as a comic book illustrator for major American publishers and as an art director at several Quebec video game studios.

== Career ==
=== Comics illustration (1990s–2005) ===
Before transitioning to the video game industry, Pierre-André Déry established himself as a comic book artist. He began by working as an inker and colorist for toy companies Hasbro and Mattel, as well as for publishers Marvel Comics and Image Comics.

In 2002, he co-founded the illustration studio Grafiksismik, based in Quebec City, specializing in comics artwork. He worked there until 2005, contributing to series published by the major American comics publishers: Marvel Comics, DC Comics, Dark Horse Comics, Devil's Due Publishing, Dreamwave, and CrossGen. His credits include Star Wars (Dark Horse), Batman, Gen 13, and Thundercats (DC), G.I. Joe (Devil's Due), Teenage Mutant Ninja Turtles and Transformers (Dreamwave), as well as numerous Marvel titles including Spider-Man, Captain America, Iron Man, New Mutants, X-Men Unlimited, Human Torch, and Sleepwalker.

=== Art director at Sarbakan (2006–2007) ===
In 2006, Déry joined Sarbakan, a Quebec City video game development studio, as art director. He worked on projects for clients including Disney, RealNetworks, Warner Bros., Playfirst, National Geographic, MTV, and Nickelodeon.

=== Volta — Executive producer (2008–2014) ===
In 2008, Déry became executive producer at Volta, a Quebec City studio specializing in outsourced visual development for console games (concept art and art direction). In this role, he oversaw the studio's visual contribution to more than thirty console titles, including games in the Far Cry, Deus Ex, and World of Warcraft franchises.

Alongside his work at Volta, Déry is credited as associate producer on Saints Row: The Third (2011), developed by Volition and published by THQ.

=== Art director at Beenox / Activision (2011–2014) ===
Déry also served as art director at Beenox, a Quebec City studio and subsidiary of Activision. He contributed to the Skylanders franchise and to The Amazing Spider-Man 2 (2014).

== Gearbox Software in Quebec ==
=== Gearbox Studio Quebec — Co-founder and co-studio head (2015–2024) ===
In 2015, Déry and Sébastien Caisse, who were both considering starting their own company, approached Gearbox Software, whose leadership was looking to expand beyond Texas. A meeting was arranged in Quebec City with support from Quebec International, allowing Gearbox executives to explore the city and its game development ecosystem.

On December 11, 2015, Gearbox Software announced the opening of Gearbox Studio Quebec, its first studio outside Texas in sixteen years. Sébastien Caisse (Ph.D) was named co-director of operations, while Pierre-André Déry was appointed co-studio head and creative director. The official press release described Déry as having previously "contributed to the visual development of more than thirty console titles, including games in the Assassin's Creed, Guitar Hero, Halo, Far Cry, Deus Ex, and World of Warcraft franchises."

The studio was tasked with developing original AAA games for consoles and PC, with plans to begin production on a first title in 2016 and to eventually create around one hundred jobs. Over the following years, the studio grew to approximately 200 employees and contributed to several major entries in the Borderlands franchise, including Borderlands 3 (2019), Tiny Tina's Wonderlands (2022), New Tales from the Borderlands (2022) and Borderlands 4 (2025).

=== Gearbox Studio Montreal — Co-founder and co-studio head (2021–2024) ===
On August 26, 2021, Gearbox Entertainment announced the creation of Gearbox Studio Montreal, a second Quebec studio representing a CAD $200 million investment, intended to add 250 jobs to Montreal's technology sector and bring Gearbox's total headcount to more than 850 people.

Caisse and Déry were again appointed to co-lead the new studio. Déry oversaw creative development and recruitment for Gearbox's Quebec operations. In the official announcement, he stated: "Building on Gearbox's long tradition of creative freedom, we are excited to bring together a new development team to work on the Borderlands franchise and create new IPs in Montreal."

In an interview with La Presse at the time of the announcement, Déry described the operational autonomy enjoyed by the Quebec studios: "Project management, human resources, business opportunities — all of that falls under Gearbox. But we have great creative freedom; we build the studio, the productions, and the teams the way we want."

=== Departure from Gearbox (2024) ===
In March 2024, Take-Two Interactive acquired Gearbox Entertainment from Embracer Group for approximately US$460 million, a transaction accompanied by waves of layoffs across the affected studios. Caisse and Déry both departed Gearbox that same year.

== Studio Ricochet (2026–present) ==
On May 7, 2026, Pierre-André Déry announced the co-founding of Studio Ricochet, an independent game development studio based in Quebec. He is joined by Sébastien Caisse, Maxime Babin (former creative director of the Borderlands series), Yanick Piché (former director of creative development at Gearbox), and veteran developers from the Call of Duty and Assassin's Creed franchises.

In an interview with GamesIndustry.biz, Déry described the studio's founding philosophy and the deliberate choice to begin self-funded, without a publisher mandate or investor timeline: "After years of building within large organizations, we wanted to create a studio that moves faster, stays focused, and takes creative risks." He explained that self-funding was a deliberate way to preserve decision-making freedom during the foundational creative phase, while noting that the team is in "active conversations" regarding medium-term financing.

When asked about the struggles faced by other veteran-led AAA studios, Déry outlined Ricochet's approach: a small senior team, low overhead, clear creative ownership, no external mandates — an ethos he summarized as "prove the vision first, then grow around it."

Studio Ricochet is in development on an unannounced debut title: an original co-op action-adventure game for PC and consoles, positioned as a premium, buy-to-play experience without a live service or games-as-a-service (GaaS) model.

== Selected video game credits ==
Title	Year	Role	Studio / Employer
Various titles (Far Cry, Deus Ex, World of Warcraft, etc.)	2008–2014	Executive producer (visual development)	Volta Creations
Saints Row: The Third	2011	Associate producer	Volta Creations (contractor)
Skylanders (series)	2011–2014	Art director	Beenox / Activision
The Amazing Spider-Man 2	2014	Art director	Beenox / Activision
Borderlands 3	2019	Co-studio head	Gearbox Studio Quebec
Tiny Tina's Wonderlands	2022	Co-studio head	Gearbox Studio Quebec
New Tales from the Borderlands	2022	Co-studio head	Gearbox Studio Quebec
Borderlands 4	2025	Co-studio head	Gearbox Studio Quebec

Sources: Gearbox official press release (2015), Game Informer (2015), MobyGames.

== Selected comics bibliography ==
Title	Publisher	Role
Star Wars	Dark Horse Comics	Illustrator
Batman, Gen 13, Thundercats	DC Comics	Illustrator
G.I. Joe	Devil's Due Publishing	Illustrator
Transformers, Teenage Mutant Ninja Turtles	Dreamwave Productions	Illustrator
Vampirella	Harris Comics	Illustrator
Spider-Man, Captain America, Iron Man, New Mutants, X-Men Unlimited, Human Torch, Sleepwalker	Marvel Comics	Illustrator / inker / colorist

Sources: Bedetheque, Marvel.com.
