= Joel McDonald =

American voice actor

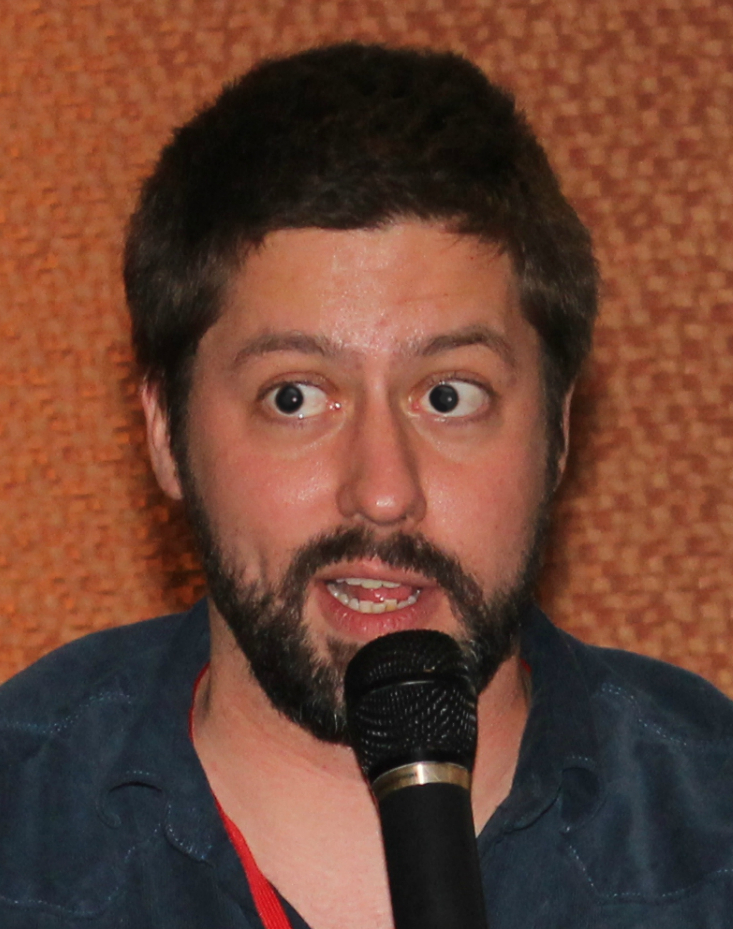
- McDonald in 2014
- Occupations: Voice actor; voice director; scriptwriter
- Years active: 2009-present
- Children: 2

Joel McDonald is an American voice actor, voice director, and scriptwriter who worked on English versions of anime series at Funimation. He is currently a voiceover producer and director with Gearbox Entertainment and author of Getting In: An Actor's Guide to the Greatest Gig There Is.

== Biography ==
Since McDonald was 7, he had a love for acting. He acted in plays at school and church, participating in community theater, secondary school theater and in speech competitions. Later, he acquired a BFA in Acting and Directing from Sam Houston State College. From that point onwards, McDonald took up acting professionally, taking parts in a national kids' theater tour, landing different roles in a couple dozen stage shows.

In 2006, after years of stage work in the Dallas-Fort Worth area, McDonald became involved in voice acting and also got into ADR directing and adaptive scriptwriting.

== Career ==
McDonald has provided voices for a number of English language versions of Japanese anime films and television shows, and video games. He is best known as the voice of Takumi Fujiwara from the Initial D series, Meow from Space Dandy, and Minato Sahashi from the Sekirei series, as well as the ADR director for the Funimation dub of One Piece, in addition to Sgt Frog, Deadman Wonderland, Space Dandy and Initial D.

In the 2010s, McDonald has been cast in more lead/major roles, such as Akane from Divine Gate, Mikage from the Kamisama Kiss series, Bartholomew Kuma from One Piece, Zeref Dragneel from Fairy Tail, Brief from Panty and Stocking, Hien from Chaos Dragon, Koki Mimura from Assassination Classroom, Azusa Hanai from Big Windup!, Toshimitsu Kubo from the Baka and Test series, Hayato Ike from the second season of Shakugan no Shana onwards, Jacuzzi Splot from Baccano, Motoharu Kaido from Aesthetica of a Rogue Hero, Ikta Solok from Alderamin on the Sky, and Dilandau Albatou from the Funimation redub of The Vision of Escaflowne.

On February 15, 2018, he resigned from Funimation as a director.

In 2018, he joined Gearbox Entertainment as a voiceover producer, director, and actor working on such titles as Borderlands 3, New Tales from the Borderlands, and the upcoming Borderlands 4.

== Personal life ==
On March 18, 2016, Joel announced the birth of his son, Beck Austin McDonald, born on March 16. His second son, Finn McDonald, was born on June 15, 2018.

== Filmography ==
=== Anime ===
List of English dubbing performances in anime
| Year | Title | Role | Notes | Source |
|---|---|---|---|---|
| 2009 | Big Windup! | Azusa Hanai | | |
| 2009 | Baccano! | Jacuzzi Splot | | |
| 2009 | Nabari no Ou | Yoite | | |
| 2009 | Sgt. Frog | Saburo Mutsumi | | |
| 2010 | One Piece | Bartholomew Kuma, Megalo, Pacifistas | Funimation dub, ADR Director | |
| 2010 | Sekirei | Minato Sahashi | also season 2 | |
| 2010 | Initial D | Takumi Fujiwara | Funimation dub, ADR Director | |
| 2010 | Linebarrels of Iron | Hideaki Yajima | | |
| 2010 | Rin: Daughters of Mnemosyne | Mary | Ep. 3 | |
| 2010 | Fullmetal Alchemist: Brotherhood | Urey Rockbell | | |
| 2012 | Darker Than Black | Hotel Manager | 1 episode, credited under "EXTRAS" | |
| 2012 | Shakugan no Shana | Hayato Ike | season 2–3 | |
| 2012 | Panty & Stocking with Garterbelt | Brief | | |
| 2012 | Black Butler | Ronald Knox | season 2 | |
| 2012 | Hetalia: Axis Powers | Poland | season 2 onwards | |
| 2012 | Okami-san and Her Seven Companions | Ryoshi Morino | | |
| 2012 | Shangri-La | Medusa | | |
| 2012 | Deadman Wonderland | | ADR Director | |
| 2013 | Aesthetica of a Rogue Hero | Motoharu Kaido | | |
| 2013 | Baka and Test | Toshimitsu Kubo | ADR Director, also season 2 and OVA | |
| 2013 | Future Diary | Ouji Kosaka | | |
| 2013 | We Without Wings | Takashi Haneda | | |
| 2013 | Last Exile: Fam, the Silver Wing | Fritz | | |
| 2013 | Guilty Crown | Daryl Yan | | |
| 2013 | Tenchi Muyo! War on Geminar | Alan | | |
| 2013 | Sankarea: Undying Love | | ADR Director | |
| 2013 | Good Luck Girl! | Ibuki | ADR Director | |
| 2014–2019 | Fairy Tail | Zeref Dragneel, Alios | Stand-In with Justin Briner | |
| 2014 | Space Dandy | Meow | ADR Director | |
| 2014 | Attack on Titan | Milieus Zermusky | also Attack on Titan: Junior High | |
| 2014 | Red Data Girl | Manatsu Soda | | |
| 2014 | Date A Live | | ADR Director | |
| 2014 | Robotics;Notes | | ADR Director | |
| 2014 | Laughing Under the Clouds | Rakuchō Takeda | ADR Director | |
| 2015 | Assassination Classroom | Koki Mimura | ADR Director, also Koro-sensei Q! | |
| 2015 | Kamisama Kiss | Mikage | also season 2 | |
| 2015 | Sky Wizards Academy | Kanata Age | | |
| 2015 | Ninja Slayer From Animation | Disturbed | Ep. 8 | |
| 2015 | Yona of the Dawn | Jaeha | | |
| 2016 | 91 Days | Arturo Tronco | Ep. 3 | |
| 2016 | Alderamin on the Sky | Ikta Solok | | |
| 2016 | All Out!! | Sunao Ōsaka | | |
| 2016 | Chaos Dragon | Hien | | |
| 2016 | Dimension W | Blue | Eps. 4–5 | |
| 2016 | Divine Gate | Akane | | |
| 2016 | Drifters | Allister | | |
| 2016 | Handa-kun | Takashi Ishida | Eps. 1–2 | |
| 2016 | Joker Game | Jitsui | ADR Director | |
| 2016 | Lord Marksman and Vanadis | Tigrevurmud Vorn | | |
| 2016 | Maria the Virgin Witch | Gilbert | | |
| 2016 | Monster Hunter Stories: Ride On | Cheval | | |
| 2016 | Prince of Stride: Alternative | Asuma Mayuzumi | | |
| 2016 | No-Rin | Kaoru Hanazono | | |
| 2016 | The Seven Deadly Sins | | ADR Script | |
| 2016 | Trickster | Kanda | | |
| 2016 | The Vision of Escaflowne | Dilandau Albatou | Funimation dub, also movie | |
| 2016 | Yuri!!! on Ice | Phichit Chulanont | | |
| 2016 | The Disastrous Life of Saiki K. | Reita Toritsuka | | |
| 2016–2025 | My Hero Academia | Yuga Aoyama | | |
| 2017 | ACCA: 13-Territory Inspection Dept. | Beurre | Ep. 4 | |
| 2017 | Chain Chronicle: The Light of Haecceitas | Melchior | | |
| 2017 | Nanbaka | Daisen Rokuriki | | |
| 2017 | Kenka Bancho Otome: Girl Beats Boys | Takayuki Konparu | | |
| 2017 | The Royal Tutor | Ernst Rosenberg | | |
| 2017 | Code Geass: Akito the Exiled | Ashley Ashra | | |
| 2017 | The Ancient Magus' Bride | Oberon | | |
| 2017 | Black Clover | Abra | Ep. 13 | |
| 2017 | Garo: Vanishing Line | Alfil | Ep. 11 | |
| 2018 | Hakyu Hoshin Engi | Kokutenko | | |
| 2019 | Fire Force | Tojo | Ep. 11 | |
| 2023 | MF Ghost | Narrator, Takumi Fujiwara | | |
| 2024 | That Time I Got Reincarnated as a Slime Season 3 | Bernie | | |

=== Films ===
List of English dubbing performances in films
| Year | Title | Role | Notes | Source |
|---|---|---|---|---|
| 2010 | Initial D: Third Stage | Takumi Fujiwara | | |
| 2012 | Fafner in the Azure: Heaven and Earth | Misao Kurusu | | |
| 2012 | Dragon Age: Dawn of the Seeker | Alte | | |
| 2013 | Shakugan no Shana: The Movie | Hayato Ike | | |
| 2017 | One Piece Film: Gold | Mohkin | ADR Director | |
| 2017 | Black Butler: Book of the Atlantic | Ronald Knox | | |
| 2017 | Genocidal Organ | Leland | | |
| 2017 | Fairy Tail: Dragon Cry | Zeref | | |
| 2017 | Initial D: Legend 1 - Awakening | Takumi Fujiwara | | |
| 2018 | Initial D: Legend 2 - Dream | Takumi Fujiwara | | |
| 2018 | Initial D: Legend 3 - Racer | Takumi Fujiwara | | |

=== Video games ===
List of performances in video games
| Year | Title | Role | Notes | Source |
|---|---|---|---|---|
| 2012 | Borderlands 2 | Capt Flynt, Jim, Tector Hodunk | | |
| 2013 | The Walking Dead: Survival Instinct | Deputy Albert Lee | | |
| 2014 | Smite | Mercury | | |
| 2014 | Tales of Xillia 2 | Chronos | English Dub | |
| 2018 | Dragon Ball Legends | Zahha | English Dub | |
| 2019 | Borderlands 3 | Burger Bot, Fanatic Male 1, Bandit 3, Nilly, Bandit Walla | | |
| 2020 | My Hero One's Justice 2 | Yuga Aoyama | English Dub | |
