= Half-Life: Decay =

2001 video game expansion-pack

- Developer: Gearbox Software
- Publisher: Sierra On-Line
- Designer: Randy Pitchford
- Writers: Matthew Armstrong; Brian Hess; Randy Pitchford
- Series: Half-Life
- Engine: GoldSrc
- Platform: PlayStation 2
- Release: NA: November 14, 2001; EU: November 30, 2001
- Genre: First-person shooter
- Mode: Multiplayer

Half-Life: Decay is a multiplayer-only expansion pack for Valve's first-person shooter Half-Life. Developed by Gearbox Software and published by Sierra On-Line, Decay was released as part of the PlayStation 2 version of Half-Life in 2001. It is the third expansion pack for Half-Life, and like its predecessors, Decay returns to the setting and timeline of the original story, albeit portraying the story from the viewpoint of a different set of protagonists: two scientists working in the Black Mesa Research Facility. Decay is a cooperative multiplayer game, designed to be played by two people working together to pass through the game's levels.

Decay was not a critical success, but was received with some positivity by video game journalists. Many reviewers felt the game was best when played with other players, but that its more puzzle-oriented gameplay somewhat detracted from the overall experience. A number of reviews stated that the game simply felt like little more than an extra add-on for the PlayStation 2 version of Half-Life.

== Gameplay ==
Decay is played in a split screen mode, as seen here.

As is the case with the other games in the Half-Life series, Decay is a first-person shooter. Like the original title it is based on, Decay requires players to engage in combat with hostile non-player characters and complete various puzzle solving tasks to advance through the game. However, Decay differs from Half-Life and its first two expansion packs, Opposing Force and Blue Shift, in that it is designed for cooperative multiplayer gameplay. This requires players to work together to progress through the game's levels and complete puzzles as they arise in-game. Although intended to be played by two people in split screen mode, Decay can still be played by a single player. In this case, the player can only control one character at a time, and can switch between the two characters quickly. When not in use, a character has sufficient artificial intelligence to defend themselves, but otherwise does not move from where they have been left by the player.

In Half-Life, players usually fight alone and only occasionally encounter friendly non-player characters who assist them, such as security guards and scientists. While Decay still features levels where this is the case, significant sections in Decay are dedicated to working with friendly non-player characters, usually escorting them to various objectives and protecting them in firefights. An array of enemy characters from Half-Life populate the game, including alien lifeforms such as headcrabs and Vortigaunts, as well as human soldiers sent in to contain the alien threat. The players have access to a limited selection of Half-Life's weaponry to assist them in the game.

The game is unique in the context of the Half-Life series in that it is the only game divided into separate missions, each with a specific objective to pursue, instead of consisting of a single unbroken narrative. How players perform in each mission is ranked at the conclusion of the level as a grade from "A" to "F". This score is based on each player's accuracy with weapons, the number of kills they acquired and the amount of damage they sustained during the course of the mission. Should players successfully complete the game's nine missions with "A" grades on every level, they are given access to a bonus cooperative mission, in which they can play as a pair of Vortigaunts, as well as the ability to play through the PlayStation 2 version of the original Half-Life as a Vortigaunt.

== Synopsis ==
=== Characters and setting ===
Colette Green (left) and Gina Cross in Decay; the models used in the game had a significantly higher level of detail than in previous Half-Life titles.

Decay is set in the same location and timeframe as Half-Life. Half-Life takes place at a laboratory called the Black Mesa Research Facility, situated in a remote desert in New Mexico. In Half-Life, the player takes on the role of Gordon Freeman, a scientist involved in an accident that opens an inter-dimensional portal to the borderworld of Xen, allowing the alien creatures of Xen to attack the facility. The player guides Freeman in an attempt to escape the facility and close the portal, ultimately traveling to Xen to do so.

Like the previous expansions, Decay shows the story of Half-Life from the perspective of a different set of protagonists. In Decay, players assume the roles of Colette Green and Gina Cross, two doctors who work in the same labs as Freeman, analyzing anomalous materials and specimens retrieved from Xen in prior teleportation experiments. After the experiment that causes the alien invasion takes place, Green and Cross must work with two ranking members of the science team, Dr. Richard Keller and Dr. Rosenberg, to contain and stabilize the deteriorating situation in Black Mesa.

=== Plot ===
Decay begins with Gina Cross and Colette Green arriving at the Anomalous Materials Labs at Black Mesa and reporting to Dr. Keller, who is readying the day's analysis of an unknown specimen. Despite the objections of Dr. Rosenberg to pushing the analysis equipment beyond its design capacities, Cross and Green are assigned to assist setting up the experiment for Gordon Freeman. When Freeman inserts the specimen into the scanning beam, however, it triggers a "resonance cascade", causing massive damage to the facility and teleporting alien creatures into the base. Keller and Rosenberg agree that Black Mesa cannot deal with the situation on its own, and so decide to call for military assistance. Cross and Green escort Rosenberg to the surface, where he sends a distress signal to the military. However, the military are ordered not only to contain the situation, but to silence the base by killing its employees. Rosenberg elects to stay behind to meet with the military on arrival and Cross and Green return to Keller.

Once reunited with Keller, Cross and Green work to seal the dimensional tear to stop the invasion. The military arrive and try to remove all personnel as well as the alien force. After resetting key equipment to prevent a second dimensional rift, the two are tasked with preparing a satellite for launch. The satellite, which is launched by Freeman in Half-Life, is used in tandem with ground-based equipment to significantly weaken the effects of the resonance cascade. Keller tasks Cross and Green with activating this set of prototype equipment, a displacement beacon, which through the satellite may be able to seal the dimensional rift. However, after activating the beacon, both characters are caught up in a "harmonic reflux", a distortion caused by the rift. Despite this, Cross and Green are able to return safely and Keller congratulates them on their success.

An unlockable bonus level, Xen Attacks, provides background information that explains how the orange crystals used by the rift-sealing machine in Half-Life: Decay are acquired and used by the Nihilanth during the final boss battle in Half-Life. In the level, two player-controlled vortigaunts battle through Marines and Black Ops in the underground Black Mesa complex to find the orange crystals in the back of a military van. After the crystals are recovered, the screen fades to black and the mission is declared a success; it is presumed that the Nihilanth warps the vortigaunts back to Xen and installs the crystals in his cave.

== Development ==
A cooperative Half-Life game was first alluded to by publisher Sierra On-Line in November 2000 with the announcement of a PlayStation 2 version of Half-Life. At the time, however, it was unclear how a cooperative version of Half-Life would be implemented; the developers, Gearbox Software, were still experimenting with finding the most balanced number of players to build a cooperative game around. By E3 2001, the game had acquired the title Decay, named after the scientific concept of exponential decay for consistency with the scientific names used by previous Half-Life titles. While the E3 convention only provided a demonstration of the main Half-Life PlayStation 2 game, further details were released relating to Decay's premise and story, as well as confirming that the cooperative mode was to be designed for two players. The game's use of new model sets were also showcased. These new models were updated versions of Gearbox's High Definition pack for Blue Shift, featuring higher numbers of polygons and animation features such as facial expressions. The enhanced models were around twice as detailed as those in the High Definition pack, which itself was of a much higher quality than the original models in Half-Life. Media updates through the months following E3 showed various screenshots and the trailer to the game. On August 18, 2001, Sierra announced that Decay was nearly complete, and would be submitted to PlayStation 2 manufacturer Sony for verification within days. The entire Half-Life for PlayStation 2 package achieved gold status on October 30, 2001, and the game was released on November 14, 2001, in North America, and in Europe on November 30.

In October 2005, work was begun by a group of Ukrainian developers to port Decay over to Windows, as a modification for both the old World Opponent Network and current Steam versions of Half-Life. The port relied on the discovery of a method that allowed Decay's PS2 game files to be converted to Windows version of the game. The port went into the beta development stage in December 2007 and was released publicly on September 23, 2008. The port was received well by the journalists in the industry; GameSpy site Planet Half-Life noted that it was a shame that an official PC version of Decay never emerged, while British journalist Alec Meer stated that it was "fantastic to have this short but sweet lost Half-Life episode on PC at last, and it even has something the PS2 version didn't—online play".

== Reception ==
Decay received a weak but overall positive reception from the video games industry's critics. Writing for GameSpot, Doug Radcliffe argued that Decay was "impressive", praising the design of puzzles required players to work together, as well as the way in which the ranking system discouraged players from competing against each other. GameSpy's David Hodgson was more reserved in his views of the game; although describing it as "great fun", he noted that it could become "tedious, with one member waiting for minutes at a time, while the other scratches their head, then completes an objective". In addition, Hodgson felt that the more puzzle-orientated nature of Decay left the action elements "a little muted compared to Gordon's single player quest". Allgame described Decay as an "added bonus" for the PlayStation 2 version of Half-Life, but noted that as the game was designed for two players, it significantly suffered when a single player attempts to play it by switching between two characters, a point that both GameSpy and GameSpot agreed on. In his review for IGN, critic Doug Perry felt that Decay was "neat in its own limited way", but that it was more of a distraction from the main game, more "a complementary cup of vegetable soup than a piping hot main dish of New York steak". While The Electric Playground reviewer Steve Smith stated that the control scheme for the PlayStation 2 version of Half-Life "is about the best we have seen on the PS2 or any console", he concluded that although Decay was a "nice add-on", it was "no reason to buy this port".
