= BL4 =

BL4 could refer to:

- BL4, a postcode district in the BL postcode area
- Biosafety level 4
- A challenge run of the game Bloodborne
- An abbreviation for the videogame Borderlands 4
