= Borderlands 2: Tiny Tina's Assault on Dragon Keep =

Borderslands 2 downloadable content

- Key art for the Tiny Tina's Assault on Dragon Keep: A Wonderlands One-Shot Adventure standalone release
- Developer: Gearbox Software
- Publisher: 2K
- Series: Borderlands
- Release: June 25, 2013: PlayStation 3, Xbox 360, Windows, OS X; WW: June 25, 2013; Linux; WW: September 30, 2014; PlayStation 4, Xbox One; NA: March 24, 2015; WW: March 27, 2015 Nintendo Switch; WW: May 29, 2020 A One-Shot Adventure; PlayStation 4, Xbox One, Windows; WW: November 9, 2021
- Genres: Action role-playing, first-person shooter
- Modes: Single-player, multiplayer

Borderlands 2: Tiny Tina's Assault on Dragon Keep is an expansion pack for the 2012 first-person shooter video game Borderlands 2. It was developed by Gearbox Software, published by 2K, and released on June 25, 2013, for Xbox 360, PlayStation 3, and PC. It is set in the tabletop role-playing game "Bunkers & Badasses", which is the Borderlands 2 derivation of Dungeons & Dragons. The titular Tiny Tina serves as the gamemaster for the tabletop game. The expansion also received a standalone release.

== Gameplay ==
Assault on Dragon Keep is set in a fantasy tabletop role-playing game, while keeping the first-person shooter aspect of the main game.

Assault on Dragon Keep is an expansion pack from the first-person shooter role-playing game, Borderlands 2. It maintains the main game's science-fiction, looter shooter, and comedic elements, while incorporating elements of tabletop role-playing, including themes from Dungeons & Dragons, and, as a result, creates a concept that integrates fantasy gameplay within a first-person shooter experience. The expansion pack's difficulty is best suited for players who are at least level thirty.

Assault on Dragon Keep revolves around "Bunkers & Badasses", a tabletop game derived from Dungeons & Dragons and is tailored for the Borderlands 2 universe. Tiny Tina serves as the gamemaster, while the original Borderlands characters take on the roles of players. Tina herself predominantly narrates the storyline, and her whims often result in the gameplay to undergo spontaneous changing to its mechanics and storyline.

Starting at the Unassuming Docks of Potentially Little Importance, the player embarks on a trek to a village called Flamerock Refuge. As the player approaches the dock, a beautiful sight unfolds, complete with a bright blue sky, a picturesque landscape, and a rainbow floating in the air. However, after Tina realizes the appropriateness of the setting, the atmosphere suddenly darkens and the player is ambushed by skeletons. The player encounters and is quickly knocked down by the first boss, an invincible dragon. In response to the Bunkers & Badasses players' complaints, Tina revives the player and instead offers "Mister Boney Pants Guy," a small skeleton, as the first boss. The player's ultimate mission is to go to Dragon Keep and save the Queen from the Handsome Sorcerer's and his Handsome Dragon's grasp. Characters from the main game, such as Torgue, Claptrap, Moxxi, and Roland, assist the player along the route.

Assault on Dragon Keep includes references to popular titles like Dark Souls, World of Warcraft, Star Wars, and Lord of the Rings. It introduces new enemies, such as a Mimic, a creature disguised as a chest, and adds new environmental elements, like replacing ammunition crates with clay jars that can be smashed by the player. Additionally, the expansion pack features recreated assets of the game's chests and vending machines. Some chests now feature icosahedron-shaped dice on top, and the quality of the randomly generated items inside them are directly influenced by the outcomes of the dice rolls.

== Synopsis ==
=== Setting ===
The expansion is set within a tabletop game played by the original Borderlands characters, with Tiny Tina serving as the gamemaster. This game, called Bunkers & Badasses, is the Borderlands universe’s equivalent of Dungeons & Dragons. Overall, the expansion centers on Tina’s struggle to cope with the death of Roland, the leader of the Crimson Raiders and a close friend killed during the main Borderlands 2 campaign. Tina inserts Roland as a character in the game’s campaign, creating scenarios and dialogue for him. Her denial is evidenced by her continuation of bringing him into the game, despite opposition from the other players.

== Development and release ==
Tiny Tina's Assault on Dragon Keep is the fourth campaign expansion pack for Borderlands 2 and was released on June 25, 2013, following the previous expansion packs: Captain Scarlet and her Pirates Booty, Mr. Torgue’s Campaign of Carnage and Sir Hammerlock’s Big Game Huntand followed by Commander Lilith & the Fight for Sanctuary from 2019. This particular expansion pack, along with the previous ones, are included in the Game of the Year Edition. Furthermore, Tiny Tina's Assault on Dragon Keep is also included in Borderlands: The Handsome Collection, which includes both Borderlands 2 and Borderlands: The Pre-Sequel, along with all downloadable content for both games.

In June 2021, Gearbox announced a Borderlands spin-off game—Tiny Tina's Wonderlands—which would be set after the events of the expansion. On November 9, 2021, Gearbox released Tiny Tina's Assault on Dragon Keep as a standalone game for PC, PlayStation 4, and Xbox One under the title Tiny Tina's Assault on Dragon Keep: A Wonderlands One-Shot Adventure.

== Reception ==
Borderlands 2: Tiny Tina's Assault on Dragon Keep

Aggregate score
Aggregator	Score
Metacritic	PC: 87/100; X360: 86/100

Review scores
Publication	Score
Destructoid	9/10
IGN	9.2/10
PC Gamer (UK)	PC: 86/100
Eurogamer	7/10
GameCentral	8/10
GodisaGeek	9/10
Gaming Nexus	9/10

According to video game review aggregator site Metacritic, Tiny Tina's Assault on Dragon Keep garnered generally positive reviews across PC, PS3 and Xbox 360 versions. Overall, Tiny Tina's Assault on Dragon Keep has been hailed by critics as the best expansion pack added to the game and a vast improvement over its predecessors, particularly the previous release, Sir Hammerlock's Big Game Hunt, which was viewed by some as a disappointment. It was described as being "the best saved for last" by GameCentral reviewer Roger Hargreaves.
