= Borderlands Legends =

2012 video game

- App icon (version 1.1.4)
- Developer: Gearbox Software
- Publisher: 2K
- Series: Borderlands
- Platform: iOS
- Release: October 31, 2012
- Genre: Real-time strategy
- Mode: Single-player

Borderlands Legends is a real-time strategy mobile game developed by Gearbox Software and published by 2K for iOS. It was released in 2012 to coincide with the release of Borderlands 2. The game was removed from the App Store on August 30, 2016.

== Reception ==
Reception

Aggregate score
Aggregator	Score
Metacritic	52/100

Review scores
Publication	Score
Destructoid	5/10
GamesMaster	64%
GamesTM	3/10
Gamezebo	2.5/5
IGN	6.5/10
Pocket Gamer	2.5/5
TouchArcade	2/5
Digital Spy	2/5

The game received "mixed or average" reviews according to the review aggregation website Metacritic. IGN said that the game was "a good idea dragged down by its inconsistent execution and lack of content."
