= Earthfall (video game) =

2018 first-person shooter video game

- Developer: Holospark
- Publisher: Gearbox Publishing
- Engine: Unreal Engine 4
- Platforms: Windows; PlayStation 4; Xbox One; Nintendo Switch
- Release: July 13, 2018
- Genre: First-person shooter
- Modes: Single-player, multiplayer

Earthfall is a four-player cooperative first-person shooter video game developed by American studio Holospark and published by Gearbox Publishing. It was released on July 13, 2018, for Microsoft Windows, PlayStation 4 and Xbox One. The game was released on Nintendo Switch on October 29, 2019, in the west and on March 19, 2020, in Japan.

== Overview ==
In the game, players are part of a guerrilla force fighting hordes of deadly alien invaders. The game has been called a clone of Left 4 Dead by critics. It received mixed to negative reviews, citing an overall lack of quality.

The game is playable with up to four players, who must travel between safe houses while surviving alien attacks and collecting resources. Players progress through "episodes" of each campaign. Enemy types vary and feature different special abilities.

== Reception ==
Earthfall received an aggregate score of 61/100 on Metacritic for Windows. T.J. Hafer of PC Gamer rated the game 75/100, calling it "worth playing with friends" and saying that while it is so similar to Left 4 Dead that it might be confused for a mod of that game, it is an "entertaining variation on that theme". James Duggan of IGN rated the game 55/100, calling it "derivative" and "Left 4 Dead, but worse". He stated that since "very few elements of Earthfall's 10 missions are randomized", replaying the same level is extremely repetitive, leading to a lack of replay value. He praised the game's weapon designs, but called the game's shooting "okay at best". Javy Gwaltney of Game Informer rated the game 50/100, saying the game "stumble[s] over its own feet when it comes to the most basic qualities of a first-person shooter".
