= Randy Pitchford =

American businessman, co-founder, president and CEO of Gearbox Software

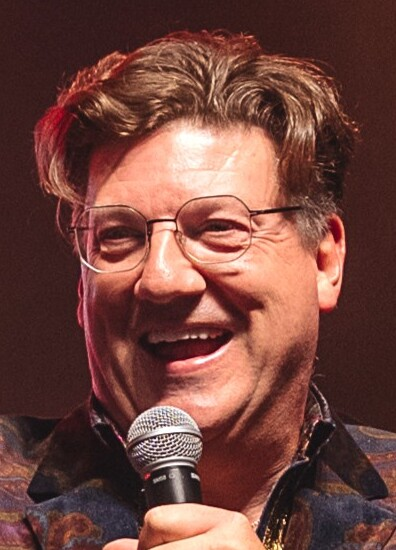
- Pitchford at Borderlands 4's launch party in 2025
- Born: Randall Steward Pitchford II; April 21, 1971 (age 55)
- Education: University of California, Los Angeles
- Occupation: President of The Gearbox Entertainment Company
- Spouse: Kristy Junio
- Children: 1

Randall Steward Pitchford II (born April 21, 1971) is an American businessman. He co-founded the video game development studio Gearbox Software in 1999 and was president and CEO of the company until 2021, upon which he became CEO and president of Gearbox's parent company, The Gearbox Entertainment Company. Following Take-Two Interactive’s acquisition of Gearbox Entertainment in 2024, Pitchford remains president.

== Early life and education ==
Pitchford's father worked within the United States intelligence system, creating high-technology equipment for agents. When Randy was five years old, his father brought home one of the computers he had developed in 1975, and later gave Randy his own computer, built by himself, when Randy was seven. Pitchford learned BASIC to try to emulate arcade games of the time. He wrote his first game (a 16-room text adventure) when he was about 11 or 12 on the machine. Pitchford stated that he played Colossal Cave Adventure and was so enamored by the game that he used a hex editor to examine the code and figure out some of the programming concepts behind it.

After high school, Pitchford went to the University of California, Los Angeles, where his future wife encouraged him to pursue a career in entertainment.

=== Interest in magic ===
Pitchford's great uncle was Richard Valentine Pitchford, a British magician who performed under the stage name Cardini. Pitchford inherited many of Cardini's books and developed an interest in magic at a young age. The Magic Castle in Hollywood, California has an exhibit dedicated to Cardini, which contains props Pitchford donated to the Academy of Magical Arts for the display. While he proceeded to work on video games on the side, he continued to perform as a professional magician in Hollywood to help pay for school.

In 2016, Pitchford purchased Genii magazine, a publication for magic and magicians. He is a member of The Magic Castle in Los Angeles, and in April 2022, acquired The Magic Castle. Erika Larsen, daughter of the Magic Castle's founders, will operate the venue. The Academy of Magical Arts, of which Pitchford is a member, will remain a tenant.

Pitchford credits his career in entertainment to the Magic Castle. Magicians Penn Jillette and David Copperfield praised the sale of the Castle to Pitchford (who married his wife Kristy on stage at the Castle) saying "'Randy is a very special person as far as the castle is concerned ... he has the means and attitude to preserve its legacy.'"

== Career ==
Pitchford began his career at 3D Realms in Texas working on games such as Duke Nukem 3D and Shadow Warrior. A group of 3D Realms developers and programmers left the company to form Rebel Boat Rocker around 1997, and Pitchford joined them in May 1997. The company's first game was to be the first-person shooter Prax War to be published by Electronic Arts (EA). Pitchford served as the lead level designer as well as the public relations head. However, EA opted to cancel the game around January 1999. With no publisher-backed project, Pitchford joined four other Rebel Boat Rockers, some his former 3D Realms colleagues, to found Gearbox Software in February 1999.

Overall, Pitchford's credited titles have sold more than 100 million copies. Games he has overseen at Gearbox have included Borderlands, Bulletstorm, and Borderlands 3. As part of his leadership in Borderlands 3, he helped to bring a distributed computing puzzle game into Borderlands 3 that supported the American Gut Project to help with RNA sequencing in collaboration with researchers at McGill University and the University of California San Diego.

Gearbox expanded out into publishing in 2015, and by 2019, The Gearbox Entertainment Company was established to be the parent company of both Gearbox Software and Gearbox Publishing. During this period, Pitchford remained the president of Gearbox Software. The Gearbox Entertainment Company was acquired by Embracer Group in February 2021 and incorporated in whole as one of the top-level divisions within Embracer. Following completion of the acquisition and the creation of Gearbox Studios, Pitchford left Gearbox Software to become president and CEO of The Gearbox Entertainment Company and president of Gearbox Studios.

In 2024, Take-Two Interactive acquired The Gearbox Entertainment Company. The company continues to operate within Take-Two’s 2K label and is led by Pitchford.

In 2021, Pitchford was recognized as Tech Titans Corporate CEO of the year, and the same year, Gearbox Entertainment Company was awarded the Tech Titans Corporate Innovation Award.

=== Film and television ===
Pitchford’s work in the video game industry expanded to film and television in 2021 when he became president of Gearbox Studios. Pitchford is the executive producer of the 2024 Borderlands film, and executive producer of the upcoming Brothers in Arms TV adaptation. Pitchford also received executive producer credit on Adam Rifkin and Penn Jillette’s 2016 film Director's Cut.

In addition, Pitchford was cast as himself in the 2011 documentary, Ctrl+Alt+Compete, and in the 2014 documentary, Video Games: The Movie. Pitchford is also featured in the 2023 documentary FPS: First Person Shooter.

PAX East in 2022, Pitchford suggested a Duke Nukem film may be in the works, confirmed when Legendary Entertainment picked up the rights that same year.

In a 2022 partnership with the Entertainment Software Association to raise scholarship funds for students following a gaming career, Pitchford auctioned off some of his apparel.

== Ludography ==
Year	Game	Role
1996	Duke Nukem 3D: Atomic Edition	Map designer
1996	Duke Nukem 3D: Plutonium Pak	Map designer
1997	Shadow Warrior	Level designer
1999	Half-Life: Opposing Force	Director, producer, level designer, writer
2001	Half-Life: Blue Shift	Director, producer, level designer, writer
2002	Tony Hawk’s Pro Skater 3 (PC)	Director, producer
2002	James Bond 007: Nightfire (PC)	Producer
2005	Brothers in Arms: Road to Hill 30	Executive producer, director, game designer
2005	Brothers in Arms: Earned in Blood	Executive producer
2008	Brothers in Arms: Hell's Highway	Creator, director, executive producer
2008	Samba de Amigo (Wii)	Executive producer
2009	Borderlands	Executive producer, game designer, writer, voice casting, voice actor
2012	Borderlands 2	Executive producer, voice actor
2013	Borderlands 2: Tiny Tina's Assault on Dragon Keep	Executive producer, voice actor
2014	Borderlands: The Pre-Sequel	Executive producer, voice actor
2015	Homeworld Remastered Collection	Executive producer
2019	Borderlands 3	Executive producer, voice actor
2022	Tiny Tina's Wonderlands	Executive producer
2024	Homeworld 3	Executive officer, president
2024	Risk of Rain 2: Seekers of the Storm	President
2025	Borderlands 4	Executive producer

== Crowdfunding ==
In 2013, Pitchford pledged US$25,000 to Penn Jillette's crowdfunding campaign for the film Director's Cut. In March 2018, Pitchford announced he had joined the advisory board for Fig, a mixed investor/crowdfunding service for video game development.

== Controversies ==
=== 2018 Medieval Times USB drive controversy ===
In 2018, former Gearbox lawyer Wade Callender filed a lawsuit against Pitchford, that alleged that Pitchford had left a USB drive containing sensitive Gearbox information and "child pornography" at a Medieval Times in 2014. Pitchford clarified that the pornographic film on the USB drive was not child pornography and stated that he had saved the pornography for the purposes of studying a sexual act performed by the female actress that he claimed to be similar to a "magic trick". Gearbox said they would file a grievance with the State Bar of Texas against Callender for "filing a lawsuit that includes accusations that he knows to be untrue". An August 2019 filing further alleged Pitchford and his employers of contempt. In October 2019, both sides announced that the lawsuit had been dropped, and a joint statement by the parties called the issue a misunderstanding, and further stated that Pitchford had been exonerated.

=== David Eddings ===
In May 2019, David Eddings, the voice actor of the Borderlands character Claptrap accused Pitchford of assault during the 2017 Game Developers Conference. According to Eddings, Pitchford physically shoved him after he mentioned to Pitchford that he had been told someone was attempting to buy Gearbox, as well as mentioning the Callender lawsuit. Eddings was let go shortly after the event, which he states was why he did not voice Claptrap in Borderlands 3. Pitchford denied he assaulted Eddings, and Gearbox stated they took the matter seriously but made no further comment as it was a personal matter.

== Personal life ==
Pitchford is married to Kristy (née Junio) and has a child.
