= Eyes in the Dark: The Curious Case of One Victoria Bloom =

- Developer: Under the Stairs
- Publisher: Gearbox Publishing
- Platform: Windows
- Release: July 14, 2022
- Genres: Rogue-lite, platform

Eyes in the Dark: The Curious Case of One Victoria Bloom is a rogue-lite platform video game developed by Zagreb-based studio Under the Stairs and published by Gearbox Publishing on 14 July 2022.

== Gameplay ==
Eyes in the Dark originated as a game-jam project in which you play as Victoria, who visits the Bloom Manor to see her grandfather. When he is kidnapped by shadow monsters, the player uses a flashlight as a mechanic in order to repel darkness and the monsters within in procedurally generated areas. All tools used are customizable and intended to be used strategically.

== Reception ==
Reception

Aggregate scores
Aggregator	Score
Metacritic	81/100
OpenCritic	83% recommend

Review scores
Publication	Score
Hardcore Gamer	4/5
Shacknews	8/10
VG247	5/5

Eyes in the Dark: The Curious Case of One Victoria Bloom received "generally favorable" reviews according to review aggregator Metacritic. Fellow review aggregator OpenCritic assessed that the game received strong approval, being recommended by 83% of critics.

Marcus Stewart, writing for Game Informer, gave an initial impression in which he described the game as having unique gameplay and a striking art direction. VG247 gave it a perfect 5 out of 5 score, stating "there's a huge avenue of endless fun and exploration here that feels incredibly fresh, and honestly, flawless". A review for The Escapist, likewise praised its visuals, but also its replayability, but criticized the fact that the controls can be a bit floaty in spots.
