= Tiny Tina's Wonderlands =

- Developer: Gearbox Software (Note: Additional development by Lost Boys Interactive)
- Publisher: 2K
- Director: Matt Cox
- Producer: Kayla Belmore
- Writer: Sam Winkler
- Composer: Joshua Carro
- Series: Borderlands
- Engine: Unreal Engine 4
- Platforms: PlayStation 4; PlayStation 5; Windows; Xbox One; Xbox Series X/S
- Release: March 25, 2022
- Genres: Action role-playing, first-person shooter
- Modes: Single-player, multiplayer

Tiny Tina's Wonderlands is a 2022 action role-playing first-person shooter video game developed by Gearbox Software and published by 2K. As a spin-off in the Borderlands series and a sequel to Tiny Tina's Assault on Dragon Keep DLC for Borderlands 2, the game is set within the world of a fantasy-themed tabletop role-playing game. The game was released for PlayStation 4, PlayStation 5, Windows, Xbox One and Xbox Series X/S in March 2022.

== Gameplay ==
Similar to its predecessors, the weapons in the game are procedurally generated.

Similar to its predecessors, the game is a first-person shooter with elements of an action role-playing game. The game can be played solo or with up to three other players in online or local split-screen multiplayer. The game is set within the world of a fantasy-themed tabletop role-playing game. The game features an overworld, which is used by the playable characters to traverse the various locations in the game. There are random combat encounters and quests that can only be completed in the overworld.

Tiny Tina's Wonderlands builds upon the standards set by the Borderlands franchise that it originated from while also differing in several key aspects. In terms of the characters themselves, rather than playing as a specific vault hunter, with their own personality and voice lines, players instead play as a custom made character using the game's character creator system. The game features six (Blightcaller class from a DLC being the seventh) different character classes, and for the first time in the series, players can mix and match these skills for their characters. The playable avatars have stats that can be upgraded using "hero points". Players have a large arsenal of weapons and firearms at their disposal, and for the first time in the series, players can wield melee weapons. The game features the same procedurally generated loot system from the Borderlands series that is capable of generating numerous combinations of weapons and other gear. The game also features new types of gear for the players to use to improve their strength. Melee weapons have their own 5th weapon slot to encourage the player to fight up close. Grenades, which have been a franchise staple, have been replaced with a spell slot on a cooldown. Players can cast spells such as summoning meteors, or transforming enemies into sheep. Lastly in terms of new equipment are two ring slots, and an amulet slot to further increase the power of the character.

After completing the main campaign, players will unlock an infinite dungeon mode known as Chaos Chamber. Each Chaos Chamber consists of six levels and includes two boss characters. The combination of enemies and bosses is randomly selected by the game. After completing each level, they will gain access to a portal which would grant the player additional perks or combat advantages, or "curses" that hinder their combat abilities. Boss characters will drop legendary weapons, and players can also spend crystals to unlock extra loots.

== Plot ==
Set after the Borderlands 2 expansion pack Tiny Tina's Assault on Dragon Keep, the campaign is set within the world of a fantasy-themed tabletop role-playing game named "Bunkers & Badasses". Tiny Tina (Ashly Burch) is its dungeon master and can change the game's world on the fly.

The story starts with Valentine (Andy Samberg), Frette (Wanda Sykes), and the player, known as The Newbie, about to defeat the Dragon Lord (Will Arnett). The Dragon Lord uses his magic to raise the undead, but is stopped by Butt Stallion, wielding the Sword of Souls. The Dragon Lord is imprisoned for centuries, and the game begins anew, this time with the Newbie being "The Fatemaker". The Fatemaker goes through the starting area with the help of Butt Stallion as their guide. They are stopped by a gang of skeletons and their leader, who has plans to awaken the Dragon Lord, who was banished in a crypt hidden in a dungeon. Despite defeating the skeleton leader, the Dragon Lord is awakened, and disappears.

The player goes to Brighthoof, which is under siege by skeletons brought by the Dragon Lord. After defeating the skeleton army, the Player is tasked by Queen Butt Stallion to retrieve the Sword of Souls from the nearby graveyard. After recovering the Sword and charging it up with the soul of The Dragon Lord’s poltergeist ally, the Player returns to Brighthoof and places the sword into the central fountain, repairing the town. For their efforts, the Queen decides to make the Player an official Knight of Brighthoof. Before she is able to, the Dragon Lord appears and steals the Sword of Souls, using it to decapitate Queen Butt Stallion. He disappears, taking the Sword and Queen Butt Stallion’s head back to his base, The Fear-amid. The Player is tasked to cross the ocean on a ship and stop the Dragon Lord, before he uses the Sword’s power to destroy the Wonderlands. Before they can cross, the Player is told to get their boat blessed by a bard or risk getting killed by an ocean monster. After finding a bard, the heavy metal guitarist Mr. Torgue (Chris Rager), he dispels the bad vibes surrounding the player (Valentine and Frette’s arguing over how to play the game). Unfortunately, the spell works too well and instead destroys the ocean, forcing the Player to cross on foot instead.

While crossing, the Dragon Lord secretly talks to the Player, revealing that he is fully aware that Wonderlands is just a game. He further reveals that he plans to harvest a massive amount of soul energy to use the Sword of Souls to sever Tina’s control over the Wonderlands, as he views her as insecure and quick to anger. Before entering the Fear-amid, the Dragon Lord shows the Player his backstory. He was originally the Dragon Knight, Tina’s personal character when she was first introduced to Bunkers and Badasses by Roland (Markus Lloyd). However, after she improperly used the Sword of Souls to wipe out all evil, this caused her character to turn evil, which angered Tina. She swore to only play as Bunker Master from then on, creating a world where only heroes win and the Dragon Lord, as a reoccurring villain, always loses. When the Dragon Lord realized his actions weren’t his own, he swore vengeance on Tina.

After entering the Fear-amid and defeating the Dragon Lord, the Player is encouraged by Tina, Valentine, and Frette to use the Sword of Souls improperly again. However, the Player uses the Sword to revive Queen Butt Stallion, and neutralize the Dragon Lord instead of killing him. Valentine, Frette and the Newbie had so much fun playing Tina’s adventure that they decide to continue playing. The Player is made an official Knight of Brighthoof, while the Dragon Lord is sentenced to 200 years of imprisonment for his crimes.

== Development ==
Tiny Tina's Wonderlands was developed by Gearbox Software with support from Lost Boys Interactive. According to Gearbox founder Randy Pitchford, the studio has been planning to release a fantasy spin-off of the series since the early 2010s, and it had unsuccessfully pitched several fantasy projects to publishers during the early days of the studio. The game's overworld system was inspired by Japanese role-playing games such as the Final Fantasy series. Gearbox intentionally designed five maps that can only be accessed through the overworld. These maps feature their own narrative threads that are also connected to the main story. Ashly Burch returned to provide her voice for Tiny Tina, while Andy Samberg, Will Arnett and Wanda Sykes portrayed other main characters in the game.

Despite Embracer Group's acquisition of Gearbox Software in 2020, the studio continued to partner with series publisher 2K Games. The game was officially announced by 2K on June 10, 2021. It was released on March 25, 2022 for PlayStation 4, PlayStation 5, Windows, Xbox One, and Xbox Series X and Series S. The PS5 and Xbox Series X/S versions will include the Dragon Lord Pack downloadable content. Players who pre-ordered the game would gain access to the Golden Hero Armor Pack. Tiny Tina's Wonderlands is the first game in the Borderlands franchise to feature full crossplay between PlayStation, Xbox, and PC; 2019's Borderlands 3 also features crossplay, but the feature was initially limited in terms of platforms that could play together, although these limitations were addressed in an update that the game received after the release of Wonderlands.

Ahead of Wonderlands's release, Gearbox made the Borderlands 2 DLC Assault on Dragon Keep available as a standalone game Tiny Tina's Assault on Dragon Keep: A Wonderlands One-Shot Adventure, released on November 8, 2021 for PlayStation 4, Windows, and Xbox One.

=== Post-release ===
Gearbox revealed a brief synopsis of season pass one in March 2022. Players can expect a new endgame content named the Mirrors of Mystery featuring constantly increasing difficulty on repeat playthroughs. The first Mirror of Mystery, Coiled Captors, was released on April 20, 2022. It received an underwhelming response from players, who compared it unfavourably to other DLC packs in the Borderlands franchise. The second pack, titled Glutton's Gamble, was released on May 20, 2022. The pack features a new villain known as the Sand Witch, whose powers are culinary-themed. The third DLC, Molten Mirrors, was released on June 21, 2022. The fourth DLC, titled Shattering Spectreglass, introduced a new character class known as the Blightcaller, who was described by Gearbox as an "elementalist" who "wields the noxious essence of swamps with potent precision". The DLC pack was released on August 14, 2022.

In 2024, a three-issue comic miniseries titled Tiny Tina’s Wonderlands: Land of the Giants was published by Dark Horse Comics as a tie-in to the game. The first issue was published on August 14, the second issue was published on September 18, and the third issue was published on October 23. The miniseries follows Tiny Tina as she conducts a new Bunkers & Badasses campaign alongside familiar characters from the Borderlands series while further exploring her character and motivations.

== Reception ==
=== Critical reception ===
Reception

Aggregate score
Aggregator	Score
Metacritic	(PC) 78/100 (PS5) 76/100 (XSXS) 77/100

Review scores
Publication	Score
Destructoid	8/10
Electronic Gaming Monthly	3/5
Game Informer	9.5/10
GameRevolution	6/10
GameSpot	7/10
GamesRadar+	4/5
Hardcore Gamer	4.5/5
IGN	8/10
PC Gamer (US)	70/100
PCGamesN	8/10
Shacknews	8/10
VG247	3/5

Tiny Tina's Wonderlands received "generally favorable" reviews, according to review aggregator website Metacritic. Reviewers praised the game's new dynamic environments, gameplay, humor and voice acting but felt that many of the problems present in Borderlands 3 were also present in this game.

EGM criticized the game's meaningless reward system, lack of resemblance to an actual tabletop role-playing experience, and quality of life issues, but commended the build customization and fantastical subclasses, claiming that Tiny Tina's Wonderlands had "...the best FPS action in the series so far." Game Informer wrote highly of the game, praising the voice acting, dialogue, story scenarios, flow, humor, fantasy elements, and gunplay, stating, "Tiny Tina's Wonderlands is Gearbox Software's best game." GameSpot praised the fantasy environments, gameplay variety, and the Chaos Chamber mode while lamenting its tonally disjointed key moments, overabundance of exposition, UI, and quest structure. While GamesRadar+ lauded the cast, humor, and gunplay, they criticized the game's repetitive nature and its inability to retain the player's engagement. Hardcore Gamer stated that the Wonderlands' humor was a marked improvement over that of Borderlands 3 and heavily praised the ability to combine classes. IGN noted that while the game's premise felt safe, it still had excellent writing and voice acting, writing, "The excellent laugh-out-loud writing is elevated by one of the strongest comedy casts of any game." PC Gamer similarly praised the game's tone and comedy while acknowledging that the quality of the game was a result of how the Borderlands formula had been honed over the years. PCGamesN gave the game an 8 out of 10, writing, "Still recognisably Borderlands, but the sense of place and improvisation elevates Tiny Tina's Wonderlands beyond expectations. The overworld map feels tacked-on, but Gearbox commits to the bit in every other aspect." Shacknews found merit in the game's character building options, humor, art style, and usage of Dungeons & Dragons tropes and mechanics.

=== Sales ===
The PlayStation 4 version of Tiny Tina’s Wonderlands sold 5,427 copies within its first week of release in Japan, making it the fourteenth bestselling retail game of the week in the country. The PlayStation 5 version sold 2,835 copies in Japan throughout the same week, making it the twenty-sixth bestselling retail game of the week in the country. Tiny Tina's Wonderlands was the second-best-selling retail video game in the United Kingdom in its week of release, according to Chart-Track. 77% of the game's launch sales in the UK, however, were digital. It was the 11th best-selling game in the US in March 2022 by dollar sales. In May 2022, Take-Two Interactive revealed that the sales of Tiny Tina's Wonderlands had exceeded the publisher's expectations.
