= Looter shooter =

Video game genre

Looter shooter (also called loot shooter) is a subgenre of action role-playing games that incorporates shooter gameplay and procedurally generated spawning of weapons and equipment. A main goal of games in the genre is obtaining better items through grinding for random drops, typically with rarities ranging from common to legendary. One of the first looter shooters was the 2007 game Hellgate: London, but the genre only became popular with Borderlands in 2009, and even more so with Destiny in 2014. It now encompasses some of the most successful AAA games. Looter shooters are often games as a service, but this model emphasizes that players ignore other games, and can lead to player burnout.

== History ==
Early shooter-based action RPGs include Star Cruiser (1988), Strife (1996), System Shock 2 (1999), the Deus Ex series (2000 onwards) by Ion Storm, Irem's Steambot Chronicles (2005), Square Enix's third-person shooter RPG Dirge of Cerberus: Final Fantasy VII (2006), and the MMO vehicular combat game Auto Assault (2006) by NetDevil and NCsoft.

Hellgate: London (2007) was one of the first looter shooters, combining elements of role-playing games with first-person shooters and promoting itself with features equivalent to the current label of "games as a service", with developers continually providing new paid post-release content. However, the game suffered from lackluster gunplay and met with mixed reviews, not achieving significant popularity. This changed upon the release of Borderlands, which had more compelling gameplay due to Gearbox Software's experience making shooters. It created the mold of the genre despite not being its first entry. Borderlands 2 (2012), which had higher quality and sold even better than the original, expanded the genre's reach further.

This was followed by the release of Destiny in 2014, which also used microtransactions, and marked a shift in the genre by introducing elements of massively multiplayer online game (MMOs). Although the game called itself a "shared-world shooter" rather than an MMO, it featured raids, clans, equivalent to MMO guilds, and a central hub world. Destiny also introduced PvP modes in addition to the typical PvE experience.

The Division (2016), a large commercial success for Ubisoft, had an uncommon amount of realism for a looter shooter game, although it was decried as formulaic by critics. Alienation (2016) was unique due to its isometric viewpoint and twin-stick shooter gameplay. Destiny 2 (2017) expanded on the previous game's story mode, becoming a title widely considered better than the first. Remnant: From the Ashes (2019) was notable for its soulslike gameplay, though only experiencing an average reception from critics and fans. Anthem (2019), a BioWare-developed title set on an alien planet and featuring flight-capable powered armor, was hyped as a sea change in the genre, but became a critical and commercial failure, blamed on development issues such as multiple shifts in direction and forced usage of the Frostbite Engine. Electronic Arts ultimately opted to end further development and stop content updates after only two years, rather than proceed with a planned "Anthem 2.0" rework.

Outriders (2021) was notably not a live service title, released as a complete standalone game. With average reviews from critics, it is unclear if the game was profitable.

=== Extraction shooter ===
Extraction shooters are a subgenre of this type of game that blend first or third-person shooter action with strategic missions where players must retrieve valuable items while facing both other players and environmental hazards. A player begins in a map's starting point and must scavenge for better gear while other players are doing the same. Enemies patrol the map also, sometimes in areas where the most valuable loot can be found, acting as obstacles and noise makers (alerting players to each other from the noise of combat). Players can get loot by exploring the map, and eliminating other players. Players can receive quests or tasks to perform to get loot and other rewards. In order to keep any acquired gear, the player must successfully extract from the map. Death means the player loses any gear they've gathered and any gear they brought into the map. Examples of this include Escape from Tarkov, ARC Raiders, Hunt: Showdown, Arena Breakout: Infinite, Delta Force and Vigor. Some shooters that don't fall strictly into this genre but feature it as a game mode include the upcoming Off the Grid, the already released DMZ Mode from Call Of Duty: Warzone, and The Division 2.

== See also ==
- First-person shooter
