= Borderlands 4 =

2025 video game

- Cover art featuring a Psycho Bandit
- Developer: Gearbox Software
- Publisher: 2K
- Director: Graeme Timmins
- Artist: Adam May
- Writer: Sam Winkler
- Composers: Finishing Move Inc.; Cris Velasco; Joshua Carro; Christian Pacaud; Casey Diiorio; Des Rocs
- Series: Borderlands
- Engine: Unreal Engine 5
- Platforms: PlayStation 5; Windows; Xbox Series X/S
- Release: PlayStation 5, Windows, Xbox Series X/S; September 12, 2025
- Genres: First-person shooter, action role-playing
- Modes: Single-player, multiplayer

Borderlands 4 is a 2025 action role-playing first-person looter shooter game developed by Gearbox Software and published by 2K. It is a sequel to Borderlands 3 (2019) and the fifth mainline entry in the Borderlands series. The game was released for PlayStation 5, Windows, and Xbox Series X/S on September 12, 2025 to generally favorable reviews from critics. A Nintendo Switch 2 release was announced but has been put on an indefinite pause with no future plans. Set six years after the events of the last game, the story follows a new group of Vault Hunters in the ancient planet Kairos, who join its local resistance to find the planet's Vault and overthrow the despotic Timekeeper.

== Gameplay ==
As with its predecessors, Borderlands 4 is a first-person looter shooter with elements commonly found in action role-playing games. Gearbox described the game's world as "seamless", and there will not be any loading screens as players explore new areas. New vehicles and traversal tools, such as a grappling hook, are introduced in Borderlands 4. The game can be played solo or cooperatively with up to three other players.

== Plot ==
=== Premise and characters ===
Pandora's moon Elpis, after being teleported away by Lilith using her Siren powers, (Note: As depicted in Borderlands 3) destroyed the protective barrier of a planet named Kairos. In Borderlands 4, players assume the role of a Vault Hunter who must lead the resistance against a ruthless dictator named the Timekeeper and his army of synthetic followers, while searching for "secret alien treasures".

Among the Vault Hunters that arrive on Kairos are Rafa the Exo-Soldier, Harlowe the Gravitar, Amon the Forgeknight, and Vex the Siren. Returning NPCs include Miss Mad Moxxi and Marcus Kincaid, and previous playable Vault Hunters Zane Flynt, Claptrap, Lilith, and Amara. The first story expansion, "Mad Ellie and the Vault of the Damned", features the addition of a fifth playable Vault Hunter, C4$H the Rogue, as well as returning NPCs Ellie, Crazy Earl, Mancubus Bloodtooth, and Davis Pickle. The second story expansion, "FL4K and the Last Resort", adds a sixth playable Vault Hunter, Loveless the Hacker, and features FL4K, a playable Vault Hunter from Borderlands 3, as a returning NPC.

=== Synopsis ===
Six years after the Moonfall incident, when Elpis appeared over Kairos due to Lilith, which revealed the planet's location, a new generation of Vault Hunters arrives on Kairos to find its Vault, which is protected by the planet's dictator, the Timekeeper, and his Order forces. The Timekeeper quickly captures the Vault Hunters and forcibly implants bolt control devices into them before they are rescued by Arjay of the Crimson Resistance, a group rebelling against the Timekeeper's rule. When the Timekeeper attempts to seize control of the Vault Hunters, Arjay sacrifices himself by jamming the Timekeeper's control, but leaves his own bolt vulnerable. The Timekeeper forces Arjay to kill himself while the Vault Hunters make their escape to the headquarters of the Crimson Resistance, where they find its leader and sole survivor, Claptrap.

Claptrap recruits the Vault Hunters into the Crimson Resistance, and tasks them with gathering additional allies from all around Kairos so they can strike back against the Timekeeper. They first manage to recruit Rush and his Outbounders, a group of off-world travelers who were stranded on Kairos, and Zadra, a former Order scientist who defects to the Crimson Resistance. Zadra explains that the Timekeeper has sealed himself away at the Vault, and the only way to access it is to acquire the command bolts of his three top lieutenants: Idolator Sol, Vile Lictor, and Callis the Ripper Queen. (Note: The player can choose to pursue the three lieutenants in any order.) The Vault Hunters assist the Outbounders in eliminating Idolator Sol, who was developing a bioweapon to wipe them out. They then collect Sol's command bolt while earning the loyalty of the Outbounders.

Afterwards, the Vault Hunters go to assist the Electi, a group of Order nobles led by Levaine who were left to fend for themselves against the Rippers, a bandit army led by Callis, who betrayed the Timekeeper by ripping out her own bolt and driving herself insane. The Vault Hunters make a deal with Levaine to fight the Rippers and eliminate Callis in return for her bolt. Short on manpower and resources, Levaine is also forced to join forces with her ex-lover and Vault Hunter Zane Flynt, who crash landed on Kairos with Mad Moxxi and the Crimson Raiders. They are able to break the Rippers' siege, but not before Callis is able steal her bolt back. Working together, the Vault Hunters and Zane pursue Callis, who they discover is using her bolt to try and reach Elpis to pursue her belief that she can ascend to godhood there. The Vault Hunters eliminate Callis and collect her bolt, which earns the loyalty of Levaine and the Electi to the Crimson Resistance.

When the Vault Hunters decide to pursue Vile Lictor, Zadra instructs them to find Defiant Calder, who leads a rebel faction of the local Augers. Calder instructs the Vault Hunters to recover an Eridian relic sacred to the Augers. Upon obtaining the relic, the Vault Hunters hear a mysterious voice instructing them to "search for the Siren", and that "Eridium is the key". Calder directs the Vault Hunters to a Siren who has recently visited them, the Vault Hunter Amara. She explains that she arrived on Kairos with the Crimson Raiders to search for the missing Lilith. They raid one of Lictor's labs under the belief that he is keeping Lilith as a test subject for his research into Sirens and the Phase Dimension (the source of Siren powers), but the test subject flees. As reality begins to break down from Lictor's experiments, the Vault Hunters and Augers assault his fortress and eliminate him. The Vault Hunters encounter the test subject again, who reveals himself to be Arjay, who was subjected to torture and experimentation to become an artificial Siren. However, the experimentation has left his mind unstable, and he plans on trapping Lilith in the Phase Dimension forever as his revenge against her for her actions bringing Elpis which lead to his torture before making his escape. With Lictor dead, the Auger clans reunite and pledge their loyalty to the Crimson Resistance.

With all three command bolts in her possession, Zadra reprograms them to gain access to the Vault, but she points out they still need to get inside the Timekeeper's capital of Dominion City to reach the Vault. Amara suggests finding Lilith, who is trapped in the Phase, to aid them with the only known Phase portal being in the remains of Elpis. The Vault Hunters, Amara, and Zane take the space elevator Callis built, fighting off a hostile Arjay on the way. They are also followed by Callis, who was kept alive due to her cybernetic enhancements. Amara uses Elpis' core to open a Phase portal which the Vault Hunters use to retrieve Lilith, and they subsequently kill Callis again, who is furious Lilith is Kairos' prophesized savior instead of her. Lilith teleports the group back to Kairos' surface, while a falling piece of Elpis breaks open a breach in the walls of Dominion City. However, the Timekeeper lures the Vault Hunters into a trap and mind controls them into killing Zadra before they break his control. Angered, the Vault Hunters continue their assault and confront the Timekeeper, who reveals his true nature as a Vault Guardian. The Vault Hunters manage to kill the Timekeeper and dismantle his Order, freeing the people of Kairos and ending its isolation from the rest of the universe.

The Vault Hunters then proceed to open the Kairos Vault, but are interrupted by Arjay, who is determined to fight them to the death. The Vault Hunters are forced to kill Arjay and end his suffering. Lilith then arrives and leads them into the Vault, where they find it contains an entity in the form of Lilith who warns them about the impending end of the universe. The Lilith entity gifts the Vault Hunters a mysterious cube, which she explains will hopefully be the key for them to survive what's to come before disappearing. Lilith then takes the Vault Hunters back to Moxxi's bar, which now serves as the new base for the Crimson Raiders and she instructs the Vault Hunters to continue dealing with the threats that remain on Kairos.

== Development and release ==
Developer Gearbox Software began working on the game prior to the release of Borderlands 3 (2019). Gearbox described Kairos as a "seamless" playable space, in which players can explore various locations of interest without being interrupted by any loading screen. While the team avoided using the term "open world", Gearbox CEO Randy Pitchford claimed that Borderlands 4 was "the most open and free" game in the franchise, contrasting Borderlands 3's planet-hopping structure, which resulted in a more "compartmentalized" design. As with its predecessors, Borderlands 4 was envisioned to be a humorous game, though the team wanted to ensure that the humor derived from emergent gameplay, in which the playable Vault Hunters will react to actions performed by players. As Borderlands 4 was set in a new planet, the game features an all-new cast. It also offered an opportunity for the art team to create landscape distinct from those on Pandora, with art director Adam May describing Kairos as a "high-tech but lo-fi" setting.

Take-Two Interactive, following its acquisition of Gearbox from Embracer Group in March 2024, confirmed that a new title in the Borderlands series was in development. Publisher 2K officially revealed the title in August 2024, and released its first gameplay footage at The Game Awards 2024. The game was originally scheduled to release for PlayStation 5, Windows, and Xbox Series X/S on September 23, 2025. On April 29, 2025, citing progress on the game, Pitchford announced that Borderlands 4 would now release ahead of schedule on September 12. The game was originally scheduled to be released for the Nintendo Switch 2 on October 3, 2025, but it has since been indefinitely delayed. In February 2026, Take-Two Interactive stated that development of the Nintendo Switch 2 version had been paused.

=== Post-launch content ===
Shortly before the release of Borderlands 4, Gearbox provided a roadmap, detailing the post-launch content schedule for the game. In addition to free updates, the game would receive paid downloadable content in the form of four "bounty packs", which are small-sized content packs featuring new missions and boss fights, as well as "Vault cards" that provides unlockable cosmetic items and weapons, and story expansions which include new playable characters and entirely new map regions.

The first bounty pack, "How Rush Saved Mercenary Day", was released on November 20, 2025 as a free update, while Gearbox revealed that an additional fifth bounty pack would be developed to honor purchases of the Deluxe and Super Deluxe editions which were initially promised four bounty packs. The second bounty pack, "Legend of the Stone Demon", was released on February 26, 2026. The third bounty pack, "A Zane to Kill For", was released on June 25, 2026. The fourth bounty pack, "Murders & Acquisitions", was released on July 30, 2026. The fifth bounty pack, "Amara and the Vile Shadows", was released on September 10, 2026.

The first story expansion pack, "Mad Ellie and the Vault of the Damned", was released on March 26, 2026. The second story expansion pack, "FL4K and the Last Resort", was released on September 10, 2026.

== Reception ==
Reception

Aggregate scores
Aggregator	Score
Metacritic	(PC) 81/100 (PS5) 78/100 (XSXS) 90/100
OpenCritic	88% recommend

Review scores
Publication	Score
Destructoid	9/10
Digital Trends	4.5/5
Eurogamer	3/5
Famitsu	33/40
Game Informer	8.5/10
GameSpot	7/10
GamesRadar+	4/5
Hardcore Gamer	4/5
IGN	8/10
PC Gamer (US)	82/100
Push Square	7/10
Shacknews	9/10
The Guardian	3/5
Video Games Chronicle	4/5

Borderlands 4 received "generally favorable" reviews for the Windows and PlayStation 5 versions while the Xbox Series X/S version received "universal acclaim", according to review aggregator website Metacritic. Fellow review aggregator OpenCritic assessed that the game received strong approval, being recommended by 88% of critics. However, the game received criticism for its performance and optimization issues. In Japan, four critics from Famitsu gave the game a total score of 33 out of 40.

Scott Duwe on Destructoid called the game "A hallmark of excellence. There may be flaws, but they are negligible and won't cause massive damage. Borderlands 4 is easily the best in the series when it comes to gameplay-feel and fun factor, and the best overall game in the franchise since Borderlands 2, but some performance issues on PC are cause for concern." The pro and cons of Jesse Lennox's review on Digital Trends praised the game's more balanced tone but added that the humor still misses quite a bit in their criticism. Rick Lane from Eurogamer said "Borderlands 4 brings a more sensible script and a true open world to its pseudo-cel-shaded gun-show. But these moderate improvements are undermined by frustrating exploration and combat that takes too long to properly shine." Brian Shea's conclusion on Game Informer was "Though many of the series’ core elements remain intact, Gearbox has refined and reconfigured them in such ways that Borderlands 4 rises beyond anything the series has accomplished to this point, making for a chaotic looter-shooter worthy of the series’ sterling early-2010s reputation." Jordan Ramée from GameSpot praised the game's starting lineup of playable Vault Hunters and the rewarding efforts in chasing loot and crafting new builds while criticising it for uninteresting main characters, dull optional side quests and repetitive enemy designs. A staggering amount of guns to choose from and beautiful art direction but a dull story and antagonist were the pros and cons of Andrew Brown from GamesRadar.

Kevin Dunsmore's Hardcore Gamer review praised its treasure trove of solid side content with excellent level and boss design however criticised its heavily weakened second act and performance issues. "Borderlands 4 gives the series the massive kick in the pants it has needed, with a fantastic open world and greatly improved combat, even if bugs and invisible walls can sometimes throw off that groove." was the review sum up of IGN''s Travis Northup. Harvey Randall's conclusion on PC Gamer was "Even a terrible UI and choppy performance didn't spoil several dozen hours of numbers-go-up bliss." The conclusion from Christian Kobza's review on Push Square was "An open world was the right move for a Borderlands franchise that's on its back foot. If you can grin and bear through some bad console performance, Borderlands 4 rewards you with a whole lot more looting and shooting. Some small new additions around the edges and a solid slate of bosses and side-quests spice up this fourth numbered entry that's still as brazen and immodest as ever." Sam Chandler of Shacknews praised the game for its serious campaign and funny side quests but also criticised it for the crashes and performance issues. Steve Boxer from The Guardian said "Familiar and predictable, but also well-honed and significantly less juvenile, the fourth Borderlands game is a blast." Jordan Middler's verdict on Video Game Chronicle praised the rewarding loot and huge number of missions that didn't feel like busy work but criticised the forgettable characters and bland main narrative.

=== Sales ===
Pitchford expected that the release of Borderlands 4 would push the franchise's total sales past 100 million units. Its release marked the biggest launch for a Borderlands game on Steam. According to data shared by analyst firm Alinea Analytics, the game reached over 2.5 million players by September 22, 2025. It also notes that the game sold over 1.3 million copies on Steam. Borderlands 4 also had the biggest launch for the franchise in the US, outselling Borderlands 3 by 30%.

Take-Two Interactive CEO Strauss Zelnick shared that the game faced "a little bit of softness out of the gate on the U.S. sales side, but in the fullness of time we're convinced it’ll all be made up, and we'll be in a great place." It was the third best-selling game of 2025 in the US.

=== Awards ===
At the Gamescom 2025, Borderlands 4 was nominated for Best Visuals, Best Microsoft Xbox Game, Best Sony PlayStation Game and Best PC Game.
