= Borderlands 3 =

2019 video game

- Cover art, with a "Psycho" enemy in a pose traditionally used for Jesus in art, with a grenade as the Sacred Heart
- Developer: Gearbox Software
- Publisher: 2K
- Director: Paul Sage
- Designer: Keith Schuler
- Artist: Scott Kester
- Writers: Danny Homan; Sam Winkler; Connor Thomas Cleary
- Composers: Jesper Kyd; Michael McCann; Finishing Move Inc.; Raison Varner
- Series: Borderlands
- Engine: Unreal Engine 4
- Platforms: PlayStation 4; Windows; Xbox One; macOS; Stadia; Xbox Series X/S; PlayStation 5; Nintendo Switch
- Release: 13 September 2019: PlayStation 4, Windows, Xbox One; 13 September 2019; macOS; 30 October 2019; Stadia; 17 December 2019; Xbox Series X/S; 10 November 2020; PlayStation 5; 12 November 2020; Nintendo Switch; 6 October 2023
- Genres: Action role-playing, first-person shooter
- Modes: Single-player, multiplayer

Borderlands 3 is a 2019 action role-playing first-person shooter video game developed by Gearbox Software and published by 2K. It is a sequel to 2012's Borderlands 2, and the fourth entry in the main Borderlands series. Borderlands 3 was released on 13 September 2019 for PlayStation 4, Windows, and Xbox One, and released for macOS on 30 October 2019. A Stadia port was released on 17 December 2019. Versions for the Xbox Series X and Series S and PlayStation 5 including free upgrades for users on the prior console versions were released on 10 and 12 November 2020, respectively. A Nintendo Switch version was released on 6 October 2023.

Players complete quests and side missions, in single-player or multiplayer, as one of four classes. When killed, enemies may drop weapons and gear which can be equipped. New abilities are unlocked as the player gains experience. The plot is centered on four new Vault Hunters recruited by the Crimson Raiders of Pandora to stop twins Troy and Tyreen Calypso and their insane cult followers from harnessing the power of the alien Vaults spread across the galaxy.

Upon release, Borderlands 3 received generally favorable reviews with praise directed to its gameplay, though some criticized the lack of innovation, technical issues, and writing. The initial sales of the game were the highest of the Borderlands series: more than five million copies were sold in five days. A sequel, Borderlands 4, was released on September 12, 2025.

== Gameplay ==
Borderlands 3 is a first-person loot shooter. Players, either playing alone or in parties of up to four people, make a character from one of the four classes available, and take on various missions given out by non-playable characters (NPCs) and at bounty boards to gain experience, in-game monetary rewards, and reward items. Players can also gain these items by defeating enemies throughout the game. As the player gains level, they gain skill points to allocate across a skill tree. The game introduces four new playable characters: Amara, a "Siren" who summons ethereal fists; Moze, a young "Gunner" who rides the mecha Iron Bear; Zane, an "Operative" with a variety of gadgets; and FL4K, a robot "Beastmaster" who summons creatures to aid in fights. Unlike previous Borderlands games, where each character had only one unique skill that operates on a cooldown, each character in the new game can unlock three unique skills, though only one (or in Zane's case, two) can be equipped at a time, greatly expanding the number of potential character builds a player can make.

Borderlands 3 shares the same core loop with previous games around taking on missions, defeating enemies, and obtaining loot from fallen foes or special chests, most often in the form of procedurally generated weapons to vary in damage, range, ammo capacity, and other special perks, giving the game "over one billion guns". Perks can include elemental effects, such as damaging the foes with fire, ice, or electricity, or may possess alternative firing behavior, among other visual differences. In Borderlands 2, some weapons had "slag" elemental, which debuffed the enemy for a short period and made them extremely vulnerable to a subsequent elemental attack from a different element. Slag weapons have been replaced with radiation; there is a debuff, but unlike slag which gives a damage increase to the player, radiation will damage enemies over time on its own and can potentially spread to other enemies through explosions on enemy death. The in-game manufacturer of the guns also plays a larger role in the type of perks a weapon can have. Tediore guns can be thrown when empty and create additional effects, Atlas have tracking bullets to hunt down enemies in cover, and Hyperion can have shields that absorb damage and use that for other purposes such as healing as well as having a reverse recoil mechanic. Other randomly-generated items include class modifiers, grenade modifiers, shield kits and relics. When playing with others, Borderlands 3's loot can be generated on a per-server basis, meaning that players must split the loot, but new to the series, players can also have loot generated on a per-player basis so that each player gains the same loot, scaled for their character level. This option also exists for the enemies seen in-game; by default enemies only scale with the player-character's level that is operating the server, but when enabled, each player sees enemies that match their individual levels.

In this gameplay screenshot, the player is fighting against a bandit. Weapons in Borderlands 3 are procedurally-generated, similar to other games in the series.

Besides character skills and weapons, player-characters have new combat maneuvers and abilities, such as crouch-sliding influenced by the mechanic in Titanfall and Apex Legends, and wall-mounting to climb up over short heights. Players and their enemies can take cover behind short barriers which can be destroyed after continued weapon onslaught.

There are 5 different worlds in Borderlands 3. The game starts on the planet Pandora, which is the first world. The player early on gains access to a spacecraft, Sanctuary III, which serves as a central hub between missions, and is used to set destinations for new planets where possible Vaults have been identified. While aboard Sanctuary III, players can manage their inventory, recover guns they had left on the field, redo their skill tree, purchase new guns and upgrades, and take on optional missions. Borderlands 3 has integration with Twitch streams; viewers can explore the streamer's inventory and skill tree, and special chests in game will offer the opportunity for viewers to receive the same gun/item that the stream finds via way of a Shift Code they can enter into their own game, scaled appropriately for their character's level.

Gearbox creative director Paul Sage estimated that players will spend about 35 hours through the main quest line along with some side missions. True Vault Hunter Mode, a type of New Game Plus, allows players to replay the campaign after finishing it with their leveled-up character, fighting more difficult enemies for a chance of better loot. The Badass Rank system from Borderlands 2 is replaced with a Guardian Rank system, which, by finishing smaller challenges throughout the game, allows players to gain buffs that persist across all their characters. Borderlands 3 will include new post-game challenges. "Circles of Slaughter" found on various planets have players attempt to fight through difficult waves of enemies for higher quality of loot. While downed players can be revived by teammates, if all player-characters die, the match is over and any potential rewards are lost. "Proving Grounds" are a type of raid that must be first discovered by finding hidden markings across the game's worlds. Once discovered, players attempt to defeat all enemies across three areas within 30 minutes to complete the challenge and earn their rewards. A further "Mayhem Mode" provides several bonuses to the player (including increased experience, damage, and rare item drops), while also increasing enemy health and randomizing several of the game's campaign elements to further increase the challenge to the player.

== Synopsis ==
=== Setting and characters ===
As part of the Borderlands series, Borderlands 3 is centered on the planet Pandora, which has been long-rumored to contain Vaults holding vast amounts of treasure and technology, left behind by a mysterious alien civilization known as the Eridians. In decades prior, several corporations have laid siege to Pandora to try to find the Vaults, but the constant conflict and bloodshed has left the planet and its population ravaged and crazed. However, there are still those independently searching for the Vaults, known as Vault Hunters (the player characters).

Borderlands 3 takes place seven years after the events of Borderlands 2 and Tales from the Borderlands. In Borderlands 2, it was discovered that numerous other Vaults exist on other planets in the galaxy. In the power vacuum left by the defeat of Handsome Jack, twin siblings Troy and Tyreen Calypso form the Children of the Vault (COV), a violent cult of personality formed from the remnants of the planet's many bandit factions, to gain possession of the other Vaults, specifically one called the "Great Vault". Lilith, a member of a race of women with alien powers called "Sirens" and current leader of the Crimson Raiders, a resistance force created to protect Pandora, recruits new Vault Hunters to help stop the Calypsos.

Several characters from past Borderlands games make a return. Previously playable Vault Hunters Lilith, Claptrap, Zer0, Maya, Brick, and Mordecai appear as NPCs. Aurelia, Sir Hammerlock's sister and one of the playable Vault Hunters in Borderlands: The Pre-Sequel, also appears as a boss. Returning NPCs include gun salesman Marcus Kincaid, explosives expert Tiny Tina (now going by just Tina), entrepreneur Miss Mad Moxxi and her mechanic daughter Ellie, cyborg hunter Sir Alistair Hammerlock, archaeologist Patricia Tannis, weapons manufacturer Mr. Torgue, and isolating Eridium trader Crazy Earl. Rhys Strongfork, one of the two playable protagonists in Tales from the Borderlands, and his best friend Vaughn also appear. Playable Vault Hunters from previous titles, including Timothy Lawrence from The Pre-Sequel and Gaige, Krieg, Axton, and Salvador from Borderlands 2, are featured as NPCs in the game's DLC.

=== Plot ===
Answering a recruiting call from the Crimson Raiders, a team of Vault Hunters (Amara, Moze, Zane, and FL4K) arrive on Pandora and meet the Crimson Raiders leader Lilith, who orders them to recover a lost Vault map, which the Children of the Vault (COV) have recently obtained. The Vault Hunters find the map, which directs them to the city-planet of Promethea, the location of the first discovered Vault and the Atlas corporation's headquarters. However, before they can depart, they are ambushed by the Calypso Twins, Tyreen and Troy, who reveal they are both Sirens from being conjoined at birth and that Troy needs Tyreen's powers to survive. Tyreen steals Lilith's powers with her life-draining abilities, then takes the map and leaves for Promethea with Troy.

The Vault Hunters and Crimson Raiders take the Sanctuary III ship to Promethea. On arrival, they find the planet under attack by the Maliwan corporation and COV forces, as Maliwan's CEO, Katagawa Jr., has joined forces with the Calypso Twins on a hostile takeover attempt on Atlas, now owned by Rhys. The Vault Hunters help Rhys stall the attack, after which he directs them to the planet Athenas where the Promethean Vault Key is kept. On Athenas, the Vault Hunters help Maya and her apprentice Ava recover the Key, learning it is only one-third of the artifact. Maya and Ava join the Crimson Raiders. The Vault Hunters return to Promethea, disable Maliwan's orbital laser cannon powered by the second part of the Key, and kill Katawaga Jr. Rhys gives them the last part of the Key and the Vault's location. Inside it, the Vault Hunters defeat the Rampager, an alien beast held within it. The Calypso Twins arrive, and Tyreen absorbs the Rampager's power, revealing their plan to absorb the power of the Vault monsters on their way to the Great Vault. Ava attempts to fight them but is overpowered. Maya intervenes to save her, but Troy kills her by draining her life force and powers.

The Vault Hunters and Crimson Raiders head to the next Vault on the swamp planet of Eden-6, owned by the Jakobs family, where the COV are also invading. Wainwright Jakobs, heir to the Jakobs corporation, agrees to help the Vault Hunters obtain the Eden Vault Key if they rescue his lover Alastair Hammerlock. The Vault Hunters find Hammerlock, who reveals he was betrayed by his sister Aurelia, who has sided with the Calypso Twins and seized the Jakobs corporation in exchange for handing them the Vault Key.

The Vault Hunters gather the three pieces of the Eden-6 Vault Key and kill Aurelia. They open the Vault and defeat its monster, the Graveward. Patricia Tannis then drains the Graveward's energy before Tyreen can absorb it wars. Enraged, the Calypsos kidnap Tannis and take her back to Pandora to publicly execute her. The Vault Hunters and Crimson Raiders return to Pandora to rescue Tannis. During the rescue, Tannis reveals that she also has Siren powers inherited from Angel after her death, a fact both she and Lilith kept a secret. Tannis warns that the Calypso Twins are preparing to open the Great Vault and drain the energy of the monster within it. The Vault Hunters assault the COV's main headquarters, but are too late to prevent Troy from activating the Vault's Key, which is the entire moon of Elpis. The Vault Hunters fight and kill Troy, resulting in Ava inheriting the Siren powers he had stolen from Maya.

However, the Great Vault starts opening and Tyreen absorbs Troy's energy before escaping. The Vault Hunters are contacted by Typhon DeLeon, the first Vault Hunter, who warns them that the Great Vault contains an interdimensional monster called the Destroyer, which can consume the entire universe. He summons the Vault Hunters to the lost Eridian homeworld, Nekrotafeyo.

At Nekrotafeyo, Typhon explains that the Great Vault isn't simply located on Pandora, but is actually the entire planet itself. The Eridians created it to act as a prison and sacrificed their entire civilization to capture the Destroyer, but left behind the machine they used in case the Destroyer escaped. As they gather the four Vault Keys needed to power the device, Tyreen reveals that Typhon is her and Troy's father. Typhon admits that he had tried to keep the twins with him on Nekrotafeyo to protect them, but they saw it as a prison, becoming bitter and power-hungry. Tyreen disables the machine before it can be used and mortally wounds Typhon before fleeing to Pandora.

The Vault Hunters reach Tyreen just as she merges with the Destroyer. They defeat her, and Lilith regains her Siren powers. However, Elpis still threatens to destroy Pandora as it continues to open the Great Vault. Lilith sacrifices herself to shut down Elpis, leaving a flaming Firehawk sign branded on the moon. During the credits, scenes depict the Vault Hunters, the Crimson Raiders, and their allies honoring and memorializing Lilith and everyone looking at the Firehawk sigil on Elpis.

== Development ==
Borderlands 3 was developed jointly by Gearbox's Texas and Quebec studios. Gearbox had finished Borderlands and its sequel consecutively, leaving the studio somewhat burned out on the franchise. To try to do something different, Gearbox shifted work into Battleborn with the blessing of 2K Games, as a means of refreshing themselves. Battleborn was not a major success, but Gearbox was not disheartened on this. According to art director Scott Kester, while developing Battleborn, they gained several ideas for how to take the next Borderlands game, and many of the team, as soon as Battleborn was complete, started building out these ideas for Borderlands 3.

Gearbox Quebec undertook developing Borderlands 3 as their first assignment, and said that they were doing so without compulsory overtime ("crunch"). The game was announced with a trailer at PAX East on 28 March 2019. The trailer received mixed reviews by video game websites, some of which characterized it as too similar in appearance and content to previous entries in the series such as Borderlands 2.

To help bridge the gap between Borderlands 2 and Tales from the Borderlands to Borderlands 3, Gearbox released new DLC for Borderlands 2, "Commander Lilith & the Fight for Sanctuary", in June 2019, making it free for a limited time to current owners of Borderlands 2.

Several voice actors reprised their roles, including Ashly Burch as Tiny Tina, and Chris Hardwick as Vaughn from Tales from the Borderlands. The recasting of other voice actors caused some controversy. Gearbox CEO Randy Pitchford quarreled on Twitter with the voice actors Troy Baker (Rhys) and David Eddings (Claptrap) about the reasons for which both were not retained to voice their former character again. Eddings said that he had been bullied and physically assaulted by his former boss Pitchford. According to Baker, Gearbox had refused to want to deal with members from the voice actor's union, SAG-AFTRA. Baker and Eddings were respectively replaced by Ray Chase as Rhys and Jim Foronda as Claptrap. Ice-T voices a character called Balex, an artificial intelligence trapped in the body of a teddy bear. Penn & Teller provide their likeness for the characters Pain & Terror, with Penn Jillette also providing his voice work for the Pain character. Gearbox requested both Cage the Elephant and The Heavy, who had done the songs used in the introductions for the first and second, respectively, game in the series, to write a song for the third, based on the intro's storyboards. The Heavy's "Put It On The Line" ended in the intro, while Cage the Elephant's "Trouble" played during the credits.

In June 2019, Gearbox invited Trevor Eastman, a series fan with terminal cancer, to play a preview build of the game. They let him name a weapon, the "Trevonator", that appears in the game. In August 2019, 2K Games and its parent company Take-Two Interactive sent private investigators to the home of a YouTuber, SupMatto. Take-Two said that he had let users access, for a fee, non-public gameplay videos of Borderlands 3, which he denied. 2K called its actions necessary to protect its trade secrets. In response, calls for a boycott of the game began trending on Twitter.

== Marketing and release ==
Powered by Unreal Engine 4, the game was released on PlayStation 4, Xbox One, and Microsoft Windows on 13 September 2019. While the game did not feature cross-platform play at launch, it was later added to the game in an April 2022 update. Four different versions of the game were released, with various add-ons, at different price points, including physical bonuses.

The game's release was preceded by a limited-time crossover event in the tenth season of Epic Games' Fortnite Battle Royale and Fortnite Creative. Players can explore a part of the planet Pandora on a small part of the Battle Royale mode's main map, as well as purchase the character Psycho with Claptrap as a back bling.

The Windows release of Borderlands 3 was exclusive to the Epic Games Store for six months, with the Steam release in March 2020. Documents unveiled during the Epic Games v. Apple trial revealed that Epic had paid $146 million to 2K for this exclusivity. Fan dissatisfaction with this exclusivity arrangement led to a review bombing of the Borderlands games on Steam. Valve, the operators of Steam, used their new processes to combat review bombing for the first time to suppress the negative reviews on the Borderlands games as a result.

Gearbox announced plans to bring the game to the PlayStation 5 and Xbox Series X and Series S consoles. The game will have free updates with all DLC already purchased for users on the prior respect console to be available on the launch day for both consoles (12 November 2020 for the PlayStation 5 and 10 November 2020 for the Xbox Series X/S). In addition to updates with these versions, the game will be updated to support two or four-player local split-screen multiplayer, and will add in additional skill trees for the four main characters.

=== Retail editions ===
Borderlands 3 was released in multiple editions:

- The standard edition includes the game disc and instruction manual.
- A "Next-Level Edition" containing the base game and all four Multiverse Final Form Cosmetic Packs.
- A "Deluxe Edition" containing the base game along with the Retro Cosmetic Pack, Neon Cosmetic Pack, Gearbox Cosmetic Pack, Toy Box Weapons Pack as well as equippable XP and Loot Drop Boost Mods.
- A "Super Deluxe Edition" containing all contents of the "Deluxe Edition" along with the first season pass and all four Multiverse Final Form Cosmetic Packs.
- An "Ultimate Edition" containing all contents of the "Super Deluxe Edition" along with the second season pass and the Butt Stallion Pack.
- A "Diamond Loot Chest Collector's Edition" containing all contents of the "Super Deluxe Edition" along with physical extras that include a Diamond Loot Chest replica, ten character figurines, a Sanctuary III snap model, four Vault Key keychains, a cloth galaxy map and five character art lithographs.

=== Downloadable content ===
Gearbox planned to release additional content through paid downloadable content for Borderlands 3, though does not plan to add any additional playable characters.

The first content pack, Moxxi's Heist of the Handsome Jackpot, was released on 19 December 2019 for all platforms. The content features the players helping Moxxi take back a casino that Handsome Jack stole from her prior to his death. The second content pack, Guns, Love and Tentacles: The Marriage of Wainwright & Hammerlock was released on 26 March 2020, which is a Lovecraftian-themed DLC and focuses on the characters Wainwright Jakobs and Sir Hammerlock, who are planning their wedding in the cult-controlled planet Xylourgos. The third content pack, Bounty of Blood was released on 25 June 2020 and is a Western-inspired DLC that also incorporates Japanese aesthetics. The fourth content pack, Psycho Krieg and the Fantastic Fustercluck, featuring the return of the character Krieg from Borderlands 2, was released on 10 September 2020. These four content packs were available as part of the game's first season pass available from the game's release.

A second season pass was announced for the game's second year to be available 10 November 2020. The new pass includes two new content packs, titled Designer's Cut and Director's Cut. Designer's Cut includes a new skill tree for each of the game's characters, and features a new game mode titled "Arms Race", which is Borderlands' own take on the battle royale genre. Director's Cut introduces small story missions and features a raid boss encounter, in addition to a new menu section that lets players view concept art and behind-the-scenes videos.

=== Updates ===
Additionally, Gearbox has the ability to hot-fix in patches and other updates to the game, allowing them to offer limited-time events. One of the first such events was a ten-year anniversary event for the Borderlands series, which had launched in October 2009. Within Borderlands 3, several week-long events offering better loot drops and unique challenges were made available during October 2019. On 24 October 2019, Borderlands 3 enabled its first Halloween-themed seasonal event, "Bloody Harvest", which ran until 5 December 2019. "Maliwan Takedown", a free content update, was added to the game permanently on 22 November 2019, adding a new end-game challenge for players featuring new enemies and raid bosses. On 23 April 2020, the second seasonal event, "Revenge of the Cartels", was added to the game, which lasted until 4 June 2020.

In April 2020, Gearbox added "Borderlands Science", a tile-matching mini-game that was developed in conjunction with McGill University, Massively Multiplayer Online Science, and The Microsetta Initiative. The game is designed to present puzzles formulated from DNA sequences from the medical studies from research into the human gut microbiome. If a player is able to achieve a minimum score for a given level, then this indicates they have found a possible match that can be flagged to researchers for further study, since not all sequences will necessarily have such a possible match. Players are rewarded with special in-game skins and limited-time loot boosters for completing these puzzles. The results of the Borderland Science initiative from April 2020 to October 2023 were published in April 2024, demonstrating that the crowd-sourced approach was able to outperform state-of-the-art computational methods.

In October 2020, Gearbox announced next generation console support for the Xbox Series X/S and PlayStation 5 platforms to come via a free update. This was planned to commence day-and-date on release of the new consoles respectively on 10 November for Xbox and 12 November for PlayStation. This support promises to fully optimize and take advantage of their processing power. Alongside vertical two-player split screen, "Xbox Series X and PS5 will display Borderlands 3 at up to 60 FPS in 4K resolution during single-player and online co-op, and the next-gen consoles will support three-and-four-player splitscreen for local multiplayer".

During November 2020 post-patch, it was discovered that Borderlands 3 can run at up to 60 FPS in native 4K on the PlayStation 5 or Xbox Series X if the resolution mode is enabled, but can also get up to 120 FPS if run in performance mode.

A June 2021 update introduced cross-platform play across all supported platforms excluding the PlayStation systems, despite plans to support this. Gearbox said this was at the request of their publisher 2K. However, by April 2022, Gearbox affirmed that they will reintroduce crossplay with PlayStation support within a few months.

== Reception ==
=== Critical reception ===
Reception

Aggregate score
Aggregator	Score
Metacritic	(PS5) 91/100 (PC) 81/100 (PS4) 78/100 (XONE) 82/100

Review scores
Publication	Score
Destructoid	9/10
Game Informer	8/10
GameSpot	8/10
IGN	9/10
PC Gamer (US)	63%
USgamer	4/5

The PlayStation 4, Xbox One and Windows versions of Borderlands 3 received "generally favorable reviews", while the PlayStation 5 version received “universal acclaim” (albeit with a much smaller number of reviews), according to review aggregator website Metacritic.

GameSpot gave Borderlands 3 a positive review, noting its preservation of the franchise's hallmarks (including weapon variety, a "personable" cast, and "juvenile humor and ludicrous jokes"), refinements to the skill system and player movement, and that its storyline "satisfyingly wraps up the arcs of characters that fans have been following for 10 years". However, it was felt that the flow of Borderlands 3 was still disrupted by the franchise's reliance on boss fights with little strategy and "bullet sponge" enemies. In conclusion, it was argued that "if you've never been a fan of the franchise, it's unlikely Borderlands 3 does enough things differently to change your mind, as the game best excels at continuing what the series has always done: deliver a humorous tall tale of misfits looting and shooting their way to heroism".

PC Gamer felt that Borderlands 3 was "the best and worst of the series all at once", acknowledging refinements to gameplay and its signature visual style, but that enemies were still "too dumb and erratic and spongy to force tactical play", and that while the different planets provided variety over the "muted deserts" of Pandora, they were often "an excuse to roll out an old character only for them to disappear or fade into the background as soon as they say hello, shoot some folks, and crack a few one-liners in sidequests that do little to reveal anything about them or test them in any way." It was also felt that the game's endgame options were "shallow" at-launch, and that its overall writing was not as good as the "pitch perfect" Tales from the Borderlands, and "[read] like teenage lunch table improv circa The Spy Who Shagged Me."

During launch, a number of Windows players experienced technical performance issues with the game, while console players found lower-than-expected frame rates, both of which Gearbox mentioned they were investigating.

=== Sales ===
According to publisher 2K, Borderlands 3 shipped more than five million copies in five days from release. In addition, the sales for the MS Windows version in this time were the highest for any 2K title to date, and more than 70% of all purchases were made through digital distribution. With these sales, the total Borderlands franchise has made more than US$1 billion in revenue. The game had sold more than 8 million copies by the end of 2019, according to Take-Two. In May 2022, Take-Two revealed sales number over 15 million copies. By 2023, the game has sold over 18 million copies.

=== Awards ===
Year	Award	Category	Result	Ref.
2019	Game Critics Awards	Best of Show	Nominated	
2019	Game Critics Awards	Best PC Game	Nominated	
2019	Game Critics Awards	Best Action Game	Nominated	
2019	Gamescom	Best Action Game	Nominated	
2019	Gamescom	Best Multiplayer Game	Won	
2019	Gamescom	Best Microsoft Xbox One Game	Nominated	
2019	2019 Golden Joystick Awards	Best Multiplayer Game	Nominated	
2019	Titanium Awards	Best Action Game	Nominated	
2019	The Game Awards 2019	Best Action/Adventure Game	Nominated	
2019	The Game Awards 2019	Best Multiplayer Game	Nominated	
2020	New York Game Awards	Tin Pan Alley Award for Best Music in a Game	Nominated	
2020	NAVGTR Awards	Art Direction, Fantasy	Nominated	
2020	NAVGTR Awards	Game, Franchise Action	Nominated	
2020	NAVGTR Awards	Use of Sound, Franchise	Nominated	
2020	SXSW Gaming Awards	Trending Game of the Year	Nominated	
2020	16th British Academy Games Awards	Multiplayer	Nominated	
2020	18th Annual G.A.N.G. Awards	Audio of the Year	Nominated	
2020	18th Annual G.A.N.G. Awards	Music of the Year	Nominated	
2020	18th Annual G.A.N.G. Awards	Sound Design of the Year	Nominated	
2020	18th Annual G.A.N.G. Awards	Best Interactive Score	Nominated	
2020	18th Annual G.A.N.G. Awards	Best Audio Mix	Nominated	
2020	18th Annual G.A.N.G. Awards	Best Game Music Cover/Remix	Nominated	
2020	2020 Webby Awards	Best Art Direction (People's Voice)	Won	
2020	2020 Webby Awards	Best Game Design (People's Voice)	Won	
2020	2020 Webby Awards	Best User Experience (People's Voice)	Won	
2020	GLAAD Media Awards	Outstanding Video Game	Nominated	
2021	GLAAD Media Awards	Outstanding Video Game	Nominated	
