= Gearbox Software =

American video game company

Gearbox Software, L.L.C.
- Logo used since 2008

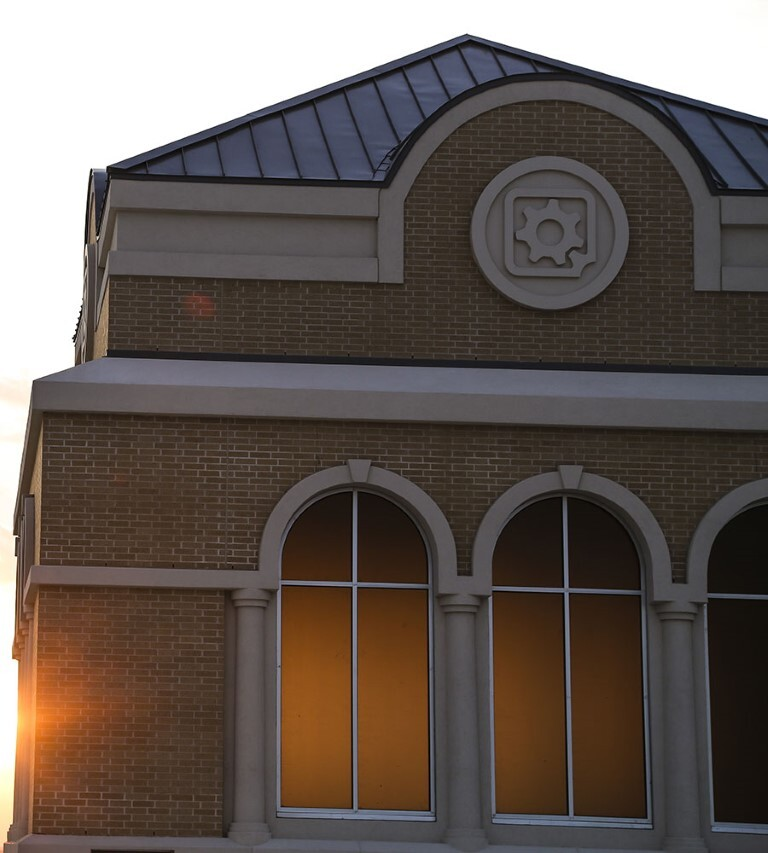
- Headquarters in Frisco
- Type: Subsidiary
- Industry: Video games
- Founded: February 16, 1999; 27 years ago
- Founders: Randy Pitchford; Brian Martel; Stephen Bahl; Landon Montgomery; Rob Heironimus
- Headquarters: Frisco, Texas, US
- Key people: Steve Jones (president); Dan Hewitt (CCO)
- Products: Borderlands series; Brothers in Arms series; Risk of Rain series; Homeworld series
- Revenue: US$184 million (2022)
- Number of employees: 1,300 (2022)
- Parent: Embracer Group (2021–2024); 2K (2024–present)
- Subsidiaries: Gearbox Studio Montreal; Gearbox Studio Québec
- Website: 2k.com/studios/gearbox/

Gearbox Software, L.L.C. is an American video game development company based in Frisco, Texas. It was established as a limited liability company in February 1999 by five developers formerly of Rebel Boat Rocker. Randy Pitchford, one of the founders, serves as president and chief executive officer. Gearbox initially created expansions for the Valve game Half-Life, then ported that game and others to console platforms. In 2005, Gearbox launched its first independent set of games, Brothers in Arms, on console and mobile devices. It became its flagship franchise and spun off a comic book series, television documentary, books, and action figures. Their second original game series, Borderlands, commenced in 2009, and by 2015 had sold over 26 million copies. The company also owns the intellectual property of Duke Nukem and Homeworld.

Gearbox expanded into publishing with the creation of Gearbox Publishing in 2015. A parent company, The Gearbox Entertainment Company, was established for Gearbox Software and Gearbox Publishing in 2019. Gearbox Entertainment was acquired by the Embracer Group in April 2021, becoming its seventh major label. A third division, Gearbox Studios, focusing on television and film productions, was established in October 2021. Due to major restructuring following a failed investment, Embracer announced plans to divest Gearbox to Take-Two Interactive, who had previously published several of Gearbox's games under its 2K label, in March 2024. Take-Two Interactive closed the Gearbox Software acquisition on June 12, 2024.

== History ==
=== Formation and initial growth (1999–2008) ===
The primary of two variations of Gearbox Software's original logo created by Brian Martel, Stephen Bahl and Landon Montgomery. The "gearbox" text was produced using Martel's old typewriter because Martel felt that only it had the font with an ideal lower-case "g".

Gearbox Software was founded on February 16, 1999, by Randy Pitchford, Brian Martel, Stephen Bahl, Landon Montgomery and Rob Heironimus, five developers formerly of Rebel Boat Rocker. Before Rebel Boat Rocker, Pitchford and Martel previously worked together at 3D Realms, and Montgomery previously worked at Bethesda Softworks. By 2000, the company employed 15 people.

They started with developing expansions to Valve's Half-Life. Porting Half-Life to console platforms (each with new game content) followed, building the company's experience in console game-making, in addition to enhancing and building upon the successful Counter-Strike branch of the Half-Life franchise. Prior to Half-Life 2, it had developed or helped develop every Half-Life expansion game or port, including Opposing Force, Blue Shift, Counter-Strike: Condition Zero, Half-Life for the Sony PlayStation 2 (including Half-Life: Decay), and Half-Life for the Sega Dreamcast (including Blue Shift). Branching out to other publishers, it pursued additional port work, each game being released with additional content, but this time from console to PC. These projects included its first non-first-person shooter, Tony Hawk's Pro Skater 3, and Halo: Combat Evolved, forging new publisher relationships with Activision and Microsoft Game Studios respectively. Additional new development, in the form of a PC game in the James Bond franchise (James Bond 007: Nightfire) for Electronic Arts, also occurred during the company's initial 5-year period.

In 2005, it launched an original property of its creation, Brothers in Arms, with the release of Brothers in Arms: Road to Hill 30 on the Xbox, PC and PlayStation 2. Later that year a sequel, Brothers in Arms: Earned in Blood, was launched. In 2008, Brothers in Arms: Hell's Highway was released.

2007 brought announcements of new projects based on licensed film intellectual properties, including the crime drama Heat and the science-fiction classic Aliens. In the September 2007 issue of Game Informer, Pitchford stated that development on the Heat game had not yet begun, as the planned development partner for the project had gone under. This was followed by an announcement by Sega that it would be helming a new version of rhythm game Samba de Amigo for the Wii, a departure from its signature first-person shooter titles.

=== Borderlands and studio expansion (2009–2015) ===
Work on a new intellectual property, Borderlands, began around 2005 and was first announced in 2007. Pitchford likened the game as a combination of computer role-playing games such as Diablo and NetHack, and first-person shooters like Duke Nukem. Defining features of Borderlands was its outlined graphical style and its procedurally-generated loot system that was capable of generating millions of different guns and other gear items. Borderlands was released in October 2009, published by 2K, a subsidiary of Take-Two Interactive. By August 2011, had sold over 4.5 million copies, making it a critical success for Gearbox and allowing it to expand the studio and budgets for subsequent games. Subsequently, Gearbox developed two additional games in the video game series, Borderlands 2 (2012) and Borderlands 3 (2019), as well as the spin-off title Tiny Tina's Wonderlands (2022), and the series has spawn additional games from other studios under 2K/Take-Two or through license, including Borderlands: The Pre-Sequel by 2K Australia, and Tales from the Borderlands from Telltale Games. Gearbox and Take-Two have also partnered with Lionsgate to develop a live-action Borderlands film, which was released on August 9, 2024.

In July 2013, Gearbox announced plans to rerelease Homeworld and Homeworld 2 in high definition for modern PC platforms, in addition to making it available through digital distributors.

In July 2014, Randy Pitchford formally contested the Aliens: Colonial Marines class action lawsuit stating the game had cost them millions of their own money and the advertising was solely the fault of the publisher.

In December 2015, Gearbox opened a second development studio in Quebec City, Canada. The studio is run by Sebastien Caisse and former Activision art director Pierre-Andre Dery. The team consists of over 100 members and is contributing to the development of original AAA titles.

=== Restructuring and acquisition by Embracer Group (2015–2024) ===
Gearbox established Gearbox Publishing in 2015, first announced to the public in December 2016, as to publish third-party games, starting with the remastered version of Bulletstorm from People Can Fly. Pitchford said that it wanted to start expanding into other areas of capital growth beyond games that Gearbox was traditionally known for, and planned to use Gearbox Publishing as a starting point. Later, in May 2019, Gearbox established The Gearbox Entertainment Company, Inc. (Gearbox Entertainment) as a parent company for both Gearbox Software and Gearbox Publishing.

Co-founder Landon Montgomery, who had left the company around 2007, died on March 25, 2020.

In April 2021, Gearbox Entertainment was wholly acquired by the Embracer Group for precisely $363 million rising to $1.378 billion should it reach specific operational targets. This addition would be the company's seventh major publishing group. Pitchford stated that while it was looking to raise capital from 2016, it came to meet with Embracer, and saw that its decentralized studio model would work well for Gearbox. 2K remained on Gearbox's board and continued to publish the Borderlands series.

Gearbox Entertainment opened a second Canadian studio, Gearbox Studio Montreal, in August 2021, to support 250 new staff, bringing the total size of Gearbox to around 850 employees.

Gearbox announced the formation of Gearbox Studios as a third company under the Gearbox Entertainment Company on October 6, 2021, to oversee television and film productions, with Pitchford serving as Gearbox Studios president alongside as president and CEO of the parent company. Former CTO Steve Jones was named as president of Gearbox Software in Pitchford's place. Embracer announced it intent to acquire Perfect World Entertainment in December 2021 and placing the group, including its publishing arm and Cryptic Studios, under the Gearbox Entertainment operating group. Following its acquisition in April 2022, Perfect World Entertainment was rebranded as Gearbox Publishing San Francisco, with the naming to be applied retroactively to past games published under Perfect World.

In April 2022, Gearbox Entertainment announced it will acquire Lost Boys Interactive, which had supported Gearbox in Tiny Tina's Wonderlands. Later that November, Gearbox acquired the Risk of Rain IP from Hopoo Games, while Embracer transferred ownership of Volition to Gearbox Entertainment from Deep Silver following poor reception to its Saints Row reboot. The studio would later shut down the following year due to the restructuring of Embracer Group. That same month, Eidos Shanghai, another studio under the Embracer Group, was transferred to Gearbox Publishing San Francisco and rebranded as Gearbox Studio Shanghai.

Gearbox Entertainment acquired Captured Dimensions, a 3D modeling company from Texas, in January 2023. Later in the month, Gearbox laid off a sizeable portion of the staff at Lost Boys Interactive. According to a Washington state WARN notice, 125 employees lost their jobs.

=== Acquisition by Take-Two Interactive (2024–present) ===
Take-Two Interactive announced its plans to acquire Gearbox Entertainment and its intellectual properties from Embracer Group for $460 million on March 28, 2024, to be added under the 2K label. The acquisition also includes Gearbox Software with its satellite studios and Gearbox Publishing. Embracer will retain Gearbox San Francisco, Gearbox Shanghai, Lost Boys Interactive, Captured Dimensions, and Cryptic Studios, along with publishing rights to Remnant, Hyper Light Breaker, and other unannounced titles. Less than a day after the announcement, it was reported that an unknown number of employees were laid off from Gearbox. On June 12, 2024, Take-Two Interactive closed the Gearbox Software transaction.

== Company structure ==
Following the acquisition, The Gearbox Entertainment Company operates as a studio within 2K.

Gearbox Software has two additional studios in addition to its main studios in Frisco, Texas; Gearbox Studio Montreal, and Gearbox Studio Québec. After the company was bought by Take-Two, many assets were retained by Embracer such as Lost Boys, Captured Dimensions and the San Francisco publishing division which was rebranded as Arc Games alongside several titles. The Gearbox Publishing division handled by The Gearbox Entertainment Company was later absorbed into 2K following Take-Two's buyout of Gearbox.

- The Gearbox Entertainment Company
  - Gearbox Properties
  - Gearbox Software
    - Gearbox Studio Montréal
    - Gearbox Studio Québec
  - Gearbox Studios

== Games ==
=== Half-Life ===
Gearbox has developed a total of six games in the Half-Life series: the expansion packs Opposing Force and Blue Shift; ports of Half-Life for Dreamcast (which included Blue Shift) and Half-Life for PlayStation 2 (which included Half-Life: Decay); it also did a large amount of work on both the retail release of Counter-Strike and the main portion of Counter-Strike: Condition Zero.

=== Brothers in Arms ===
During its fourth year, Gearbox began working on its first independently owned game: Brothers in Arms: Road to Hill 30. Developed for PC and Microsoft's Xbox console, and built with the Unreal Engine 2, it was released in March 2005. The sequel, Brothers in Arms: Earned in Blood, followed seven months later. The series was published by Ubisoft, who supported both games with PlayStation 2 versions, and later worked with it to develop Brothers in Arms games for portable systems (mobile phones, PlayStation Portable and Nintendo DS) and the Wii home console.

In 2005, Gearbox licensed the Unreal Engine 3 from Epic Games, to replace the Unreal Engine 2 technology used in previous games, and grew its internal development teams to handle the demands of next-generation technology and content. Brothers in Arms: Hell's Highway was the first new title to be announced, continuing the company's flagship franchise.

Brothers in Arms: Hell's Highway was launched in September 2008. By 2008, the franchise also spun off a comic book series, a two-part television documentary, a line of action figures, and a novelization and non-fiction history book.

=== Borderlands series ===
After the completion of Brothers in Arms: Earned in Blood, Gearbox began working on its second original game, Borderlands. The game was envisioned by Pitchford as a combination of the roguelike genre with action role-playing games like Diablo in a first-person shooter. Set on the fictional planet Pandora, players control a Vault Hunter as they fight off the planet's hostile wildlife and human forces while seeking a fabled Vault that is claimed to be filled with riches. Part of Borderlands' features is the use of procedural generation to create the weapons and other gear that drop from defeating enemies or completing missions, with the first game featuring more than 15 million possible variations, according to Gearbox. Borderlands also features a cell-shaded-like art style giving the game a comic-book appearance.

Borderlands was released in 2009, and became an unexpected success for Gearbox, selling around three to four million copies by 2011. This has launched several followup games, including the direct sequels Borderlands 2 (2012), Borderlands 3 (2019), and Borderlands 4 (2025), the prequel Borderlands: The Pre-Sequel (2015) and the spinoff title Tiny Tina's Wonderlands (2023), all that expand on the series' mechanics. In addition, two interactive fiction games, Tales from the Borderlands (2014) and New Tales from the Borderlands (2022) have been released. A feature film, Borderlands (2024), has also been released.

=== Duke Nukem series ===
Duke Nukem Forever had been a project with a troubled development history at 3D Realms, who had created the Duke Nukem series, since sometime prior to 2000. Due to financial difficulties in 2009, 3D Realms was forced to downsize and ultimately lay off most of the development staff. Take-Two Interactive sued 3D Realms for failing to deliver Duke Nukem Forever.

Pitchford, who had prior industry relations with many 3D Realms staff including George Broussard, learned that many of the 3D Realms team were still eager to develop Duke Nukem Forever, working out of their homes on what they could. Pitchford negotiated with Take-Two to bring many of the former 3D Realms staff into a new studio called Triptych Games, housed at Gearbox's headquarters, to continue working on Duke Nukem Forever following 3D Realms' closure in 2009. As a result, 3D Realms sold the rights to Duke Nukem and the existing work on Duke Nukem Forever to Gearbox around February 2010. Take-Two and Gearbox subsequently announced in September 2010 that Gearbox would finish production of Duke Nukem Forever. Duke Nukem Forever was released in June 2011, and received negative critical reception on release, with most of the criticism directed towards the unfinished, rushed state of the game. Despite the criticism, the game topped the charts on release and made a profit.

3D Realms had initially sued Gearbox in June 2013 for unpaid royalties over Duke Nukem Forever, but dropped the suit by September 2013, with 3D Realms' founder Scott Miller stating that it was a misunderstanding on its part.

3D Realms was eventually acquired in part by Interceptor Entertainment, and in 2014, Interceptor announced plans to make a new Duke Nukem game, Duke Nukem: Mass Destruction. Gearbox filed suit against 3D Realms and Interceptor based on the fact that Gearbox now owned the rights to the Duke Nukem franchise. The case was settled out of court in August 2015, with 3D Realms and Interceptor acknowledging that Gearbox has full rights to the Duke Nukem series. Following the settlement, Gearbox released Duke Nukem 3D: 20th Anniversary Edition World Tour in September 2016. The game included new levels developed in conjunction with some of the original developers, re-recorded lines by original Duke voice actor Jon St. John, and new music from original composer Lee Jackson. It was released on October 11, 2016.

=== Aliens: Colonial Marines ===
Aliens: Colonial Marines was a result of Gearbox's exploration into working on licensed film properties in 2007, and was developed under license from 20th Century Fox, who held the film rights, and Sega, who held the game publishing rights to the franchise. Aliens: Colonial Marines was planned as a first-person shooter, both single-player and multiplayer, with players as members of human squads facing the franchises titular xenomorphs in settings based on the films. Gearbox did initial development on the game, but as the studio started working on Borderlands and Duke Nukem Forever, they drew developers off Aliens though still collected full payments from Sega. Sega and 2K discovered the discrepancy on Gearbox's allocation of its staff on its projects, which lead to a round of layoffs in 2008.

After Gearbox released Borderlands to critical acclaim in 2009, it began work on its sequel rather than re-allocating developers to Aliens. Instead, the studio outsourced the work to third parties, including Demiurge Studios, Nerve Software, and TimeGate Studios. By 2012, Gearbox took over full development of the game as it neared its planned release in February 2013, but due to the heavily outsourced process, the game's state was haphazard, forcing Gearbox to cancel a planned beta period and rush the game through the final stages of production, certification, and distribution. On release, the game suffered from performance issues even on target hardware specifications, and shipped with a software bug that hampered the artificial intelligence of the xenomorphs in the game, making the game far less challenging than promised; it was discovered in 2019 that this bug was result of a typographic error in a configuration file shipped with the game. The game's poor performance led Sega to cancel planned releases for the Wii U.

A class action lawsuit filed in April 2013 by Roger Damion Perrine and John Locke alleged that Gearbox and Sega falsely advertised Aliens: Colonial Marines by showing demos at trade shows that did not accurately represent the final product. Sega and the plaintiffs reached a settlement in late 2014, wherein Sega agreed to pay $1.25 million to the class. The plaintiffs dropped Gearbox from the suit in May 2015.

=== Battleborn ===
Released in May 2016, Battleborn was a cooperative first-person shooter video game with multiplayer online battle arena (MOBA) elements. Battleborn takes place in a space fantasy setting where multiple races contest possession of the universe's last star. Players select one of multiple pre-defined heroes, customized with passive abilities gained through end-of-mission loot, to complete both player-vs-player and player-vs-environment events. During such events, characters are leveled up through their "Helix tree", granting one of two abilities at each level. It was released within a month of Blizzard Entertainment's Overwatch, a hero shooter with similar concepts, and which quickly overshadowed Battleborn. The title went free-to-play in June 2017 and was shut down in January 2021.

=== Homeworld series ===
After 10 years without any new releases to the series, Gearbox acquired the rights to the Homeworld series from THQ in 2013. Shortly after that the Homeworld Remastered Collection was released in 2015, containing updated High-Definition versions of Homeworld and Homeworld 2 compatible with modern Windows and Mac OS X systems.

In September 2013, Gearbox announced a partnership with Blackbird Interactive and licensing the Homeworld-IP for its then-named Hardware: Shipbreakers game. This game later became Homeworld: Deserts of Kharak and was released on January 20, 2016 as a prequel to the original Homeworld game of 1999.

On August 30, 2019, Gearbox announced Homeworld 3 which was developed by Blackbird Interactive. The game's development was at least partially funded through a crowdfunding campaign on the Fig platform, and was released May 13, 2024.

== Other media ==
A Borderlands film was released by Gearbox and Lionsgate in 2024, with Eli Roth as director. The film received negative reviews from critics and poor reception from fans.

In April 2020, Gearbox announced it was developing a television series based on its Brothers in Arms series.

== Technology ==
In 2006, it partnered with Dell and Intel to provide development computer systems and technology for its studio.

In June 2007, it purchased a Moven motion capture system that uses non-optical inertia technology, to augment its existing Vicon optical motion capture system becoming one of the few independent developers with two in-house motion capture capabilities.

In February 2008, it was announced that it had licensed NaturalMotion's Morpheme software.

== List of video games ==
=== Games developed ===
Year	Title	Platform(s)	Publisher(s)
1999	Half-Life: Opposing Force	Linux, macOS, Microsoft Windows	Sierra Studios
2001	Half-Life: Blue Shift	Linux, macOS, Microsoft Windows	Sierra Studios
2001	Half-Life	PlayStation 2 (port)	Sierra Studios
2001	Half-Life: Decay	PlayStation 2	Sierra Studios
2002	Tony Hawk's Pro Skater 3	Microsoft Windows (port)	Activision O2
2002	James Bond 007: Nightfire	Microsoft Windows	EA Games
2003	Halo: Combat Evolved	Microsoft Windows (port)	Microsoft Game Studios
2005	Brothers in Arms: Road to Hill 30	macOS, Microsoft Windows, PlayStation 2, Xbox	Ubisoft
2005	Brothers in Arms: Earned in Blood	macOS, Microsoft Windows, mobile, PlayStation 2, Wii, Xbox	Ubisoft
2006	Brothers in Arms: D-Day	PlayStation Portable	Ubisoft
2007	Brothers in Arms DS	Nintendo DS	Ubisoft
2008	Samba de Amigo	Wii (port)	Sega
2008	Brothers in Arms: Double Time	macOS, Wii	Ubisoft
2008	Brothers in Arms: Hell's Highway	Microsoft Windows, PlayStation 3, Xbox 360	Ubisoft
2009	Borderlands	macOS, Microsoft Windows, PlayStation 3, Xbox 360	2K
2011	Duke Nukem Forever	macOS, Microsoft Windows, PlayStation 3, Xbox 360	2K
2012	Borderlands 2	Linux, macOS, Microsoft Windows, PlayStation 3, PlayStation Vita, Xbox 360	2K
2012	Borderlands Legends	iOS	2K
2013	Aliens: Colonial Marines	Microsoft Windows, PlayStation 3, Xbox 360	Sega
2014	Borderlands: The Pre-Sequel!	Linux, macOS, Microsoft Windows, PlayStation 3, Xbox 360	2K
2015	Borderlands: The Handsome Collection	PlayStation 4, Xbox One	2K
2015	Homeworld Remastered Collection	macOS, Microsoft Windows	Gearbox Software, Aspyr
2016	Battleborn	Microsoft Windows, PlayStation 4, Xbox One	2K
2016	Duke Nukem 3D: 20th Anniversary World Tour	Microsoft Windows, PlayStation 4, Xbox One	Gearbox Publishing
2019	Penn & Teller VR: F U, U, U, & U	Microsoft Windows, PlayStation VR, Oculus Quest	Gearbox Publishing
2019	Borderlands 3	Microsoft Windows, macOS, PlayStation 4, PlayStation 5, Xbox One, Xbox Series X/S	2K
2022	Tiny Tina's Wonderlands	Microsoft Windows, macOS, PlayStation 4, PlayStation 5, Xbox One, Xbox Series X/S	2K
2022	New Tales from the Borderlands	Microsoft Windows, Nintendo Switch, PlayStation 4, PlayStation 5, Xbox One, Xbox Series X/S	2K
2024	Risk of Rain 2: Seekers of the Storm	Microsoft Windows, Nintendo Switch, PlayStation 4, PlayStation 5, Xbox One, Xbox Series X/S	Gearbox Publishing
2025	Borderlands 4	Microsoft Windows, Nintendo Switch 2, PlayStation 5, Xbox Series X/S	2K
2025	Risk of Rain 2: Alloyed Collective	Microsoft Windows, Nintendo Switch, PlayStation 4, PlayStation 5, Xbox One, Xbox Series X/S	2K Games
2026	Risk of Rain 2: Hallowed Concepts	Microsoft Windows, PlayStation 5, Xbox Series X/S	2K Games

=== Games published ===
==== Gearbox Publishing ====
Year	Title	Platform(s)	Developer(s)
2016	Homeworld: Deserts of Kharak	macOS, Windows	Blackbird Interactive
2017	Bulletstorm: Full Clip Edition	Windows, Nintendo Switch, PlayStation 4, Xbox One	People Can Fly
2017	Fortnite (physical format)	Windows, PlayStation 4, Xbox One	Epic Games
2017	Desert Bus VR	Windows	Dinosaur Games
2018	Burnstar	Nintendo Switch	Nerve Software
2018	Earthfall	Windows, PlayStation 4, Xbox One, Nintendo Switch	Holospark
2018	We Happy Few	Windows, PlayStation 4, Xbox One	Compulsion Games
2019	Trover Saves the Universe		Squanch Games
2019	Into the Dead 2	Nintendo Switch	PikPok
2020	Risk of Rain 2	Windows, Nintendo Switch, PlayStation 4, Xbox One, Stadia	Hopoo Games
2020	Godfall	Windows, PlayStation 4, PlayStation 5, Xbox One, Xbox Series X/S	Counterplay Games
2021	Tribes of Midgard	Windows, PlayStation 4, PlayStation 5, Nintendo Switch, Xbox One, Xbox Series X/S	Norsfell Games
2022	Eyes in the Dark: The Curious Case of One Victoria Bloom	Windows	Under The Stairs
2023	Blanc	Windows, Nintendo Switch	Casus Ludi
2023	Risk of Rain Returns	Windows, Nintendo Switch	Hopoo Games
2023	Relic Hunters Legend	Windows	Rogue Snail
2024	Homeworld 3	Windows	Blackbird Interactive
2024	RKGK / Rakugaki	Windows	Wabisabi Games
