= Borderlands (film) =

2024 film by Eli Roth

- Theatrical release poster
- Directed by: Eli Roth
- Screenplay by: Eli Roth; Joe Crombie
- Story by: Eli Roth
- Based on: Borderlands by Gearbox Software
- Produced by: Ari Arad; Avi Arad; Erik Feig
- Starring: Cate Blanchett; Kevin Hart; Jack Black; Edgar Ramírez; Ariana Greenblatt; Florian Munteanu; Gina Gershon; Jamie Lee Curtis
- Cinematography: Rogier Stoffers
- Edited by: Julian Clarke; Evan Henke
- Music by: Steve Jablonsky
- Production companies: Arad Productions; Picturestart; Gearbox Studios; 2K
- Distributed by: Lionsgate Films (under Summit Entertainment)
- Release dates: August 6, 2024 (TCL Chinese Theatre); August 9, 2024 (United States)
- Running time: 101 minutes
- Country: United States
- Language: English
- Budget: $110–120 million
- Box office: $33 million

Borderlands is a 2024 American science fiction action comedy film directed and co-written by Eli Roth, based on the video game series. Cate Blanchett stars as Lilith, an outlaw who forms an alliance with a team of misfits to find the missing daughter of the most powerful man in the universe. The ensemble cast also features Kevin Hart, Jack Black, Edgar Ramirez, Ariana Greenblatt, Florian Munteanu, Gina Gershon, and Jamie Lee Curtis.

The film was announced in August 2015, with Leigh Whannell in talks to direct. By February 2020, Roth was attached to direct from a screenplay by Craig Mazin. Casting took place from May 2020 to April 2021, with Blanchett cast first and others the following year. Principal photography began in April 2021 in Budapest, Hungary, during the COVID-19 pandemic, and wrapped in June. Two weeks of reshoots took place in early 2023, directed by Tim Miller due to Roth's commitments to Thanksgiving. That June, Mazin removed his name from the project and was replaced by Joe Crombie.

Borderlands premiered at the TCL Chinese Theatre in Los Angeles, California on August 6, 2024, and was released in the United States by Lionsgate on August 9. The film received negative reviews from critics and grossed $33 million against a budget of $110–120 million, becoming a box-office bomb.

== Plot ==
On the planet of Pandora, Roland, a mercenary soldier apparently gone rogue, kidnaps teenager Tiny Tina with the help of Krieg, a "Psycho" who was institutionalized in the same facility. Meanwhile, on another planet, bounty hunter Lilith is contacted by Atlas, a powerful corporate magnate. He convinces her to rescue Tina, his daughter. Lilith returns to Pandora, her home planet, for the first time since she was a child. With the help of Claptrap, a robot that was mysteriously programmed to wait for her on Pandora, she locates Tina.

After realizing that Atlas wants his daughter back against her will, Lilith teams up with Roland and Krieg when they are attacked by the Crimson Lance, the private army of Atlas. Lilith is informed that Tina was genetically engineered with biological material from the Eridians, the ancient race that once inhabited Pandora, and that Atlas believes only she can open the Vault where the secrets of the lost civilization's advanced technology are kept.

With the help of Lilith's estranged foster mother, Dr. Patricia Tannis, they locate the key to open the Vault in an underground maze occupied by a tribe of Psychos. They manage to take the key to the surface. Lilith destroys the device Atlas entrusted her with to signal when she had rescued Tina, and he immediately communicates with her via robotic drone, explaining that he still wants the girl. Tina overhears the end of the conversation and assumes that Lilith has betrayed her. She throws a grenade at Lilith, leaving her unconscious. When Lilith recovers, Claptrap unknowingly plays a holographic message for her, recorded by her mother.

The next day, without Lilith and Claptrap, the team find the Vault only to realize that Atlas is waiting for them, and they fight off his men. However, Tina is unable to open the Vault. Lilith appears and explains that she is the one who can do it, being an Eridian known as the Firehawk. Atlas threatens to kill Tina if Lilith does not open the Vault. She obeys but, with Tina's help, traps Atlas inside, where a creature drags him away. The group celebrates their survival.

== Cast ==
- Cate Blanchett as Lilith
- Kevin Hart as Roland
- Jack Black as Claptrap
- Édgar Ramírez as Deukalian Atlas
- Ariana Greenblatt as Tiny Tina
- Florian Munteanu as Krieg
- Janina Gavankar as Knoxx
- Gina Gershon as Moxxi
- Jamie Lee Curtis as Tannis
- Haley Bennett as Lilith's mom
- Olivier Richters as Krom
- Benjamin Byron Davis as Marcus
Additionally, Penn Jillette, who voiced Pain in the video game Borderlands 3 (2019), filmed a cameo as a preacher overseeing a wedding, but the scene was cut from the final version, as were scenes with Cheyenne Jackson as Wainwright Jakobs and Charles Babalola as Alistair Hammerlock.

== Production ==
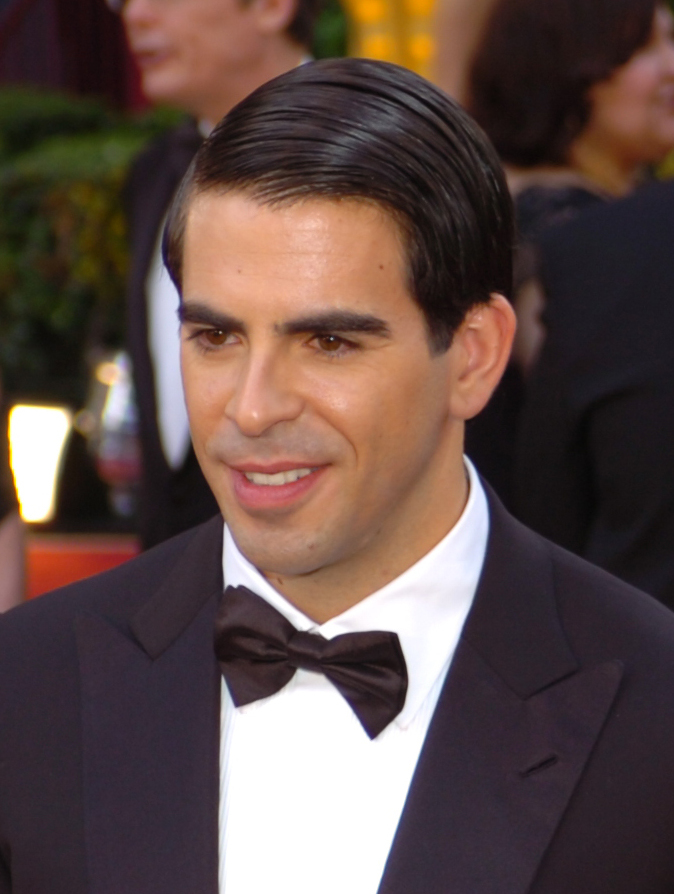
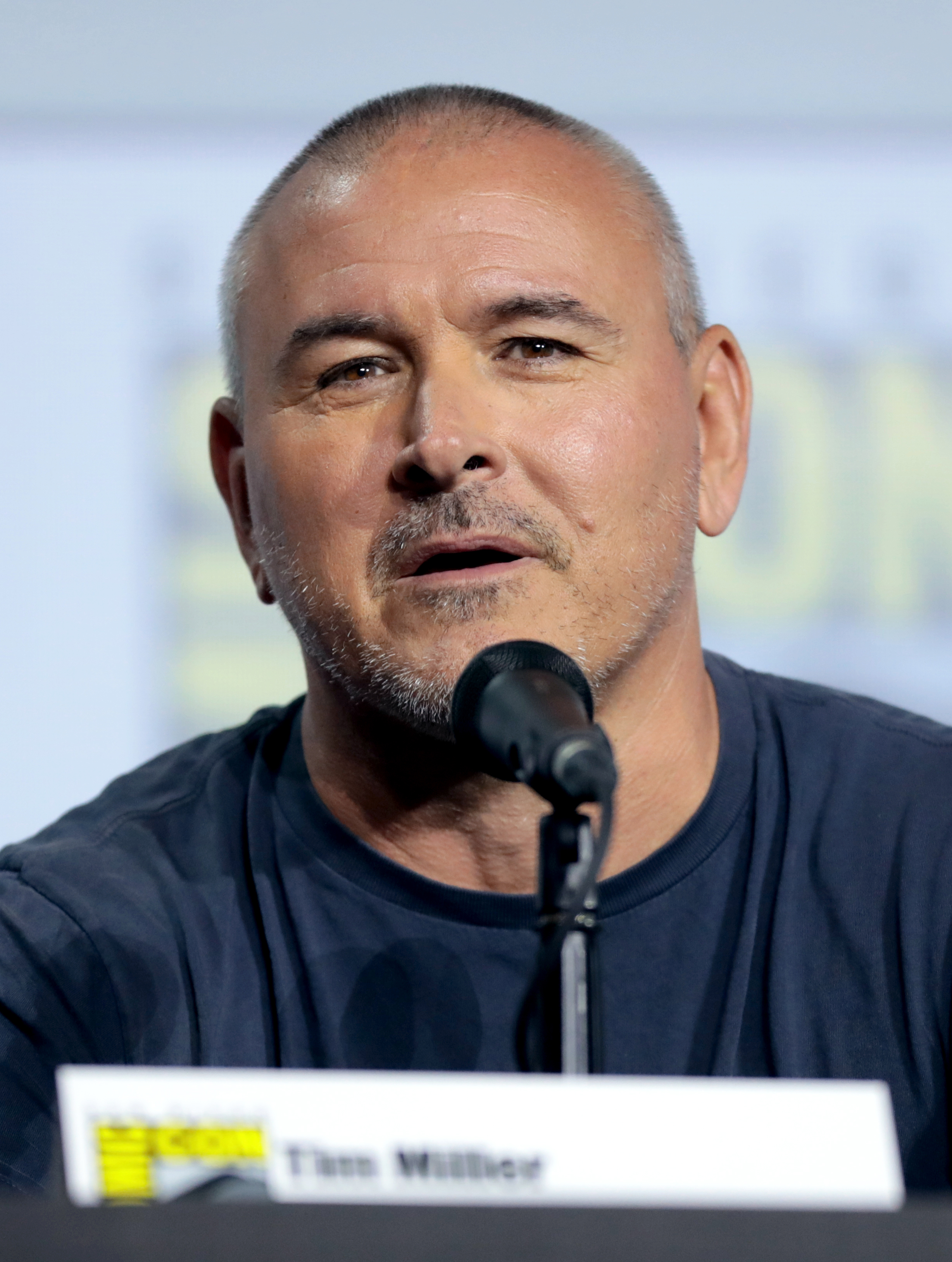
Writer and director Eli Roth (left). Tim Miller (right) took over directing duties during reshoots.

In 2011, Gearbox Software CEO Randy Pitchford had his first conversation about a possible film adaptation of Borderlands with producers Ari and Avi Arad of Arad Productions. Pitchford was convinced that a film adaption would work after the release of Tales from the Borderlands. He later planned on starting a Borderlands cinematic universe. In May 2015, Leigh Whannell was in talks with Lionsgate to write and direct an adaptation of the video game series. The film was officially announced in August 2015; however, Whannell's involvement was left omitted.

Eli Roth stated that his French bulldog pooping gave him inspiration while pitching the film. "I have to look away because she gets really shy. But one day I filmed her. She had that shy look on her face and I was like, 'That's Claptrap.'" A scene of Claptrap pooping was included in the final film.

Aaron Berg was tapped to pen an R-rated take on the material in April 2016. By June 2018, Oren Uziel assumed scripting duties from Berg. On February 20, 2020, Lionsgate announced that Roth was attached to direct the film from a screenplay written by Craig Mazin, with Erik Feig joining as producer through his production company Picturestart. By April 2021, Mazin's script had been rewritten by Juel Taylor and Tony Rettenmaier; and again by Roth. A plot synopsis was released in April.

Cate Blanchett was cast as Lilith in May 2020. Speaking of her decision to join the project, Blanchett said: "The gun-slinging stuff was so much fun. I got really absorbed in that whole world. I think there also may have been a little Covid madness—I was spending a lot of time in the garden, using the chainsaw a little too freely. My husband said, 'This film could save your life'."

Kevin Hart, who trained with United States Navy SEALs prior to auditioning for the role of Roland, was added to the cast in January 2021. Both Jamie Lee Curtis and Jack Black – as the voice of Claptrap, were confirmed in February. In March 2021, Ariana Greenblatt and Florian Munteanu were added to the cast. In April, it was announced that Édgar Ramírez had been cast to portray Deukalian Atlas, the main antagonist. That same month, Janina Gavankar was added to the cast as Commander Knoxx of the Crimson Lance, Atlas' private army; an original character for the film, she is the daughter of General Knoxx, a high-ranking Atlas Corporation officer and major antagonist from The Secret Armory of General Knoxx DLC of the video game.

Filming began on April 1, 2021, in Budapest, Hungary, during the COVID-19 pandemic, and wrapped on June 22. On June 4, 2021, first-look images of the cast were released, with black-and-white images obscuring all but the cast's silhouettes. In January 2023, it was announced the film would be going through two weeks of reshoots directed by Tim Miller, due to Roth's commitments to Thanksgiving. Zak Olkewicz wrote new pages for Miller. In June 2023, Mazin removed his name from the project, replaced by Joe Crombie; Mazin has denied reports that Crombie was his pseudonym. Additional literary material was credited to Berg, Uziel, Taylor, Rettenmaier, Olkewicz, Chris Bremner, and Sam Levinson. Steve Jablonsky composed the film's score after replacing Nathan Barr.

Jimmy O'Dee, the stunt coordinator for the film, stated that scenes depicting heads being blown up and feet being cut off were cut to maintain a PG-13 rating.

== Release ==
=== Theatrical ===
Borderlands was initially planned to be released in 2022. It premiered at the TCL Chinese Theatre in Los Angeles on August 6, 2024. It was theatrically released in the United States by Lionsgate Films on August 9, 2024. The film cost $110–120 million to produce, and Lionsgate spent $30 million on print and advertising. International pre-sales reportedly covered 60% of production costs. Sales of Borderlands 3 on Steam rose after the film's release and the concurrent player amount doubled from around 6,000 to a peak of 12,231. In promotion of the film, Borderlands 3 received a content update introducing new customization options inspired by the film's visuals, including character skins and weapon designs.

In August 2024, Gearbox Software officially announced Borderlands 4. This announcement led to speculation that it was strategically timed to deflect from the film's critical reception, a marketing approach seen in other franchise adaptations.

=== Home media ===
On August 18, 2024, Lionsgate Home Entertainment announced that Borderlands would be released on Digital HD and platforms on August 30, 2024. The film was released on DVD, Blu-ray, and 4K Ultra HD Blu-ray on October 22, 2024.

== Reception ==
=== Box office ===
Borderlands grossed $15.5 million in the United States and Canada, and $17.5 million in other territories, for a worldwide total of $33 million. Deadline Hollywood calculated Lionsgate lost $80 million on the film, when factoring together all expenses and revenues.

In the United States and Canada, Borderlands was released alongside It Ends with Us and Cuckoo, and was projected to gross $8–16 million from 3,125 theaters in its opening weekend. The film made $4 million on its first day, including an estimated $1.32 million from Thursday previews. It ended up debuting with $8.6 million, finishing in fourth. It made $2.4 million in its second weekend.

Strauss Zelnick, CEO of Take Two Interactive and the parent company of Gearbox, said in November 2024, "Even though the film was disappointing, it actually benefited our catalogue sales" in terms of the video game series, but also stated they will remain selective about future video game film adaptions.

=== Critical response ===
Borderlands received negative reviews from critics. On the review aggregator website Rotten Tomatoes, 10% of 167 critics' reviews are positive, with an average rating of 3.3/10. The website's consensus reads: "Glitching out in every department, Borderlands is balderdash." Metacritic, which uses a weighted average, assigned the film a score of 26 out of 100, based on 36 critics, indicating "generally unfavorable" reviews. Audiences polled by CinemaScore gave the film an average grade of "D+" on an A+ to F scale, while those surveyed by PostTrak gave it a 46% positive score, with 31% saying they would definitely recommend it.

The Guardian called the film "janky" and a "juvenile and derivative adaptation" while Variety found it was a "generic gaming adaptation that deprives audiences of the most valuable ingredient of its source: surprise." The Independent said it was a "total disaster" while Rolling Stone wondered if Borderlands was the worst video game movie ever. The Evening Standard suggested it was the worst film of the year. PC Gamer compared Borderlands to numerous other video game movie adaptations: "You might have heard the claim that this is a righting of the scale, … [to] remind us that good adaptations are the exception, not the rule. We needed a new Super Mario Bros.. We didn't get one. Borderlands cannot hold a candle to Super Mario Bros. It is not interestingly bad. ... It has no cheesy, thwarted ambition to redeem it. It never becomes more than a waste of a hundred minutes."

Blanchett's performance was praised by Tim Grierson of Screen Daily, who contrasted it with the rest of the ensemble cast: "Not many in the starry ensemble shine. Vivid character actors like Gina Gershon and Jamie Lee Curtis ... are trapped in stale genre types. Even the potentially intriguing change-of-pace performances—such as Hart in a far more sombre turn than we expect from the explosive comedian—flatline." Among the more positive reviews, MovieWeb wrote, "Roth displays his cinematic prowess with solid combat scenes. Munteanu's Krieg is a beast and a half, twisting baddies into human pretzels with unabashed glee. The violence is brutal but not graphically disturbing ... It's stunning to see a Roth film without even a hint of blood. The producers made a business calculation to avoid the R-rating and allow children who also enjoy the games to see the film. Die-hard Roth fans expecting his trademark gruesome torture should sit this one out."

Brian Tallerico, writing for RogerEbert.com, gave the film one star out of four, describing it as an "ugly, boring, truly inept piece of filmmaking".

It is considered one of the worst films of 2024 by Metacritic, Letterboxd, Digital Trends, Screen Crush and The Times-Tribune. Screen Rant wrote that the script, action sequences, humor, PG-13 rating, unoriginality, underdeveloped characters, and lack of chemistry were criticized; though some praised Blanchett's performance.

=== Accolades ===
Award	Date of ceremony	Category	Recipient(s)	Result	Ref.
Costume Designers Guild Awards	February 6, 2025	Excellence in Sci-Fi/Fantasy Film	Daniel Orlandi	Nominated	
Golden Raspberry Awards	February 28, 2025	Worst Picture	Avi Arad, Ari Arad, and Erik Feig	Nominated	
Golden Raspberry Awards	February 28, 2025	Worst Director	Eli Roth	Nominated	
Golden Raspberry Awards	February 28, 2025	Worst Actress	Cate Blanchett	Nominated	
Golden Raspberry Awards	February 28, 2025	Worst Supporting Actor	Jack Black	Nominated	
Golden Raspberry Awards	February 28, 2025	Worst Supporting Actor	Kevin Hart	Nominated	
Golden Raspberry Awards	February 28, 2025	Worst Screen Combo	Any two obnoxious characters (but especially Jack Black)	Nominated	
Golden Trailer Awards	May 30, 2024	Best Fantasy/Adventure	"Make It Rain" (Lionsgate Films / Create)	Nominated	
Golden Trailer Awards	May 30, 2024	Best Motion/Title Graphics	"Make It Rain" (Lionsgate Films / Create)	Won	
Queerties Awards	March 20, 2024	Next Big Thing	Borderlands	Nominated	

== See also ==
- List of films based on video games
