= Dameon Clarke =

Canadian actor

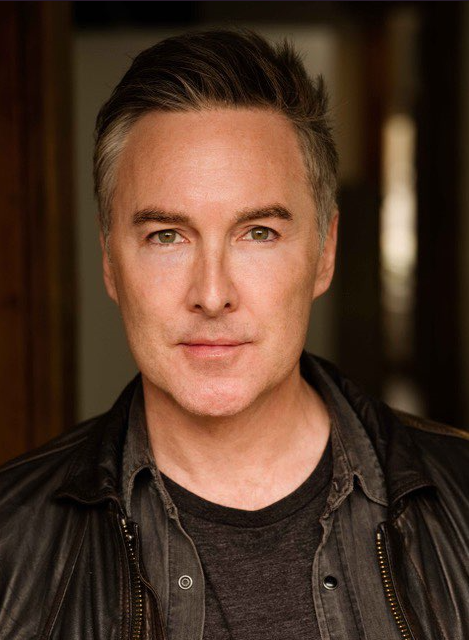
- Photo still Los Angeles, 2022
- Born: Mississauga, Ontario, Canada
- Occupation: Actor
- Years active: 1984–present
- Agent: Mary Collins Agency
- Spouse: Anna C. Salih (m. 1998; div. 2003)

Dameon Clarke is a Canadian actor who has done work for anime, films, TV shows and video games. His voice acting roles have been with Funimation, where he voiced Cell in the Dragon Ball series, Younger Toguro in Yu Yu Hakusho, Scar in Fullmetal Alchemist, Neko Modoki in Kamichu!, Proxy One in Ergo Proxy, Victor Hilshire in Gunslinger Girl, Kazuma Soma in Fruits Basket, and George Kaminski in Case Closed. In video games, he voices Handsome Jack in the Borderlands series. On camera, he has appeared in TV shows such as Graceland, 24, Castle, Supernatural, and Prison Break.

Clarke, who was born in Mississauga, Ontario, also starred in the indie film How to Be a Serial Killer, for which he won several awards at film festivals.

== Filmography ==
=== Voice acting ===
==== Anime ====
List of dub performances in anime TV and special series
Year	Title	Role	Notes	Source
2000	Dragon Ball Z: The History of Trunks	Gohan (Future)	TV special, Funimation dub	
2000–05	Dragon Ball Z	Cell, others	Funimation dub	
2001	Dragon Ball	Tambourine, others	Funimation dub	
2001	Blue Gender	Dice Quaid, Ted		
2002–06	Yu Yu Hakusho	Younger Toguro	Funimation dub	
2002	Fruits Basket (2001)	Kazuma Soma		
2003	Lupin III: Voyage to Danger	Keith Hayden	TV special, Funimation dub	
2003	Dragon Ball GT	Cell		
2004	Kiddy Grade	Armblast		
2004	Case Closed	George Kaminski, others	Seasons 1–4	
2004–06	Fullmetal Alchemist	Scar		
2005	Gunslinger Girl	Victor Hilshire		
2005	Girls Bravo	Ebi (monologue)		
2006	GunXSword	Wu		
2006	Kamichu!	Neko Modoki		
2007	Ergo Proxy	Proxy One		
2011	Dragon Ball Z Kai	Cell	Credited as Dartanian Nickelback	
2011	Yu Yu Hakusho: Eizou Hakusho	Younger Toguro	OVA	
2017	Dragon Ball Z Kai: The Final Chapters	Cell	Ep. 99, flashback	
2018	Dragon Ball Super	Cell, Tambourine		
2019-2021	Fruits Basket (2019)	Kazuma Soma		

==== Anime films ====
List of voice performances anime direct-to-video and feature films
Year	Title	Role	Notes	Source
2003	Dragon Ball Z: Broly – The Legendary Super Saiyan	Paragus		
2005	Lupin III: Farewell to Nostradamus	Chris, Phillip	Funimation dub	
2006	Case Closed: The Time Bombed Skyscraper	George Kaminski		
2014	Dragon Ball Z: Battle of Gods	Cell	Uncut version	
2019	Dragon Ball Super: Broly	Paragus		
2022	Dragon Ball Super: Super Hero	Cell Max		

==== Video games ====
List of voice performances in video games
Year	Title	Role	Notes	Source
2000	Blair Witch Volume 1: Rustin Parr	Ken, Editor, Hale Cooper		
2002	BloodRayne			
2002–present	Dragon Ball series	Cell, Tambourine, others		
2003	RoadKill	Slade		
2004	Seven Samurai 20XX	Additional voices		
2004	Fullmetal Alchemist 2: Curse of the Crimson Elixir	Scar		
2004	BloodRayne 2	Zerenski, Minions		
2005	Unreal Championship 2: The Liandri Conflict	Anubis		
2005	Spikeout: Battle Street	Various		
2006	Valkyrie Profile 2: Silmeria	Arngrim		
2008	Final Fantasy IV	Scarmiglione		
2011	Marvel vs. Capcom 3: Fate of Two Worlds	Nathan Spencer	Grouped under "Voice Talent"	
2011	Ultimate Marvel vs. Capcom 3	Nathan Spencer	Grouped under "Voice Talent"	
2012	Street Fighter X Tekken	Rolento	As Alan Smithe	
2012	Borderlands 2	Handsome Jack, Marshall Friedman	Also in Assault on Dragon's Keep DLC as Handsome Wizard	
2014	Borderlands: The Pre-Sequel!	Handsome Jack, Doppelganger	Also in Claptastic Voyage DLC	
2014	Ultra Street Fighter IV	Rolento	As Alan Smithe	
2014–15	Tales from the Borderlands	Handsome Jack		
2017	Marvel vs. Capcom: Infinite	Nathan Spencer		
2019	Borderlands 3	Handsome Jack, Timothy Lawrence	As Murky Waters; also in Handsome Jackpot DLC	
2020	Mafia: Definitive Edition	Detective Norman		

=== Live-action ===
List of acting performances in feature films
Year	Title	Role	Notes	Source
2001	Hall of Mirrors	Agent Riley		
2003	Secondhand Lions	Animal Truck Driver		
2004	The Alamo	Mr. Jones		
2006	A Scanner Darkly	Mike		
2008	How to Be a Serial Killer	Mike Wilson		
2008	Fab Five: The Texas Cheerleader Scandal	Coach Adam Reeve		
2009	I Love You Phillip Morris	Houston lawyer		

List of acting performances in television
Year	Title	Role	Notes	Source
1984	Secrets of a Married Man	Alex	Television film	
1985	Blackout	Mark	Television film	
2000	Walker, Texas Ranger	Co-Pilot	Episode: "Turning Point"	
2002	The President's Man: A Line in the Sand	Andy Shelby	Television film	
2003	Saving Jessica Lynch	Ranger Harper	Television film	
2004	LAX	Jim	Episode: "Pilot"	
2005	Criminal Minds	Chris Crawford	Episode: "The Fox"	
2006	CSI: Miami	Wayne Reynolds	Episode: "The Score"	
2007	Without a Trace	Kelsey Stewart	Episode: "Eating Away"	
2007	What About Brian	Brad	2 episodes	
2008	Prison Break	Andrew Blauner	4 episodes	
2008	Supernatural	Jack Montgomery	Episode: "Metamorphosis"	
2009	24	Alan Tanner	4 episodes	
2009	CSI: Crime Scene Investigation	Scott Tucker	Episode: "Deep Fried and Minty Fresh"	
2009	Raising the Bar	Sean Lusik	Episode: "No Child's Left Behind"	
2009	CSI: NY	Aaron Dexter	Episode: "Blacklist (Featuring Grave Digger)"	
2010	NCIS: Los Angeles	Gage Jensen	Episode: "LD50"	
2010	Castle	Scott Dunn	2 episodes	
2010	Make It or Break It	Committee Chairman	Episode: "At the Edge of the Worlds"	
2013	NCIS	Homicide Detective Paul Dockry	Episode: "Alibi"	
2014	Major Crimes	Alan Burke	Episode: "Sweet Revenge"	
2013–14	Graceland	ADIC Clarke	6 episodes	
2015	Rizzoli & Isles	Sam Langdon	Episode: "Misconduct"	
2016	CSI: Cyber	Edward Daniels	Episode: "404: Flight Not Found"	
2016–17	How to Get Away with Murder	Detective Mumford	7 episodes	

== Awards and nominations ==
Year	Award	Nominated work	Result	Ref.
2008	New York City Horror Film Festival Award for Best Actor	Mike Wilson in How to Be a Serial Killer	Won	
2009	Shriekfest Award for Best Actor	Mike Wilson in How To Be a Serial Killer	Won	
2012	Spike Video Game Award for Best Performance by a Human Male	Handsome Jack from Borderlands 2	Won	
