= George Wyner =

American actor

- Born: Boston, Massachusetts, U.S.
- Education: Syracuse University
- Occupation: Actor
- Years active: 1971–present

George Wyner is an American actor best known for his supporting role as Colonel Sandurz in Spaceballs (1987), which he is set to reprise in Spaceballs: The New One (2027), as well as his supporting roles in films such as My Favorite Year (1982), To Be or Not to Be (1983), The Devil's Advocate, The Postman (both 1997), American Pie 2, Not Another Teen Movie (both 2001), A Serious Man (2009), and Trouble with the Curve (2012). Wyner is also known for his recurring role as Assistant District Attorney Irwin Bernstein on the NBC police procedural series Hill Street Blues (1981–1987) and his lead role as Deputy Max Rubin on the sitcom She's the Sheriff (1987–1989).

== Early life ==
Wyner was born in Boston, one of six sons born to Edward Newton Wyner and Helen Theresa Crowley, both of whom were Jewish. His father founded and managed the Ritz-Carlton Hotel, where he and his five brothers grew up in a penthouse apartment at the hotel. After his father died while he was in high school, Wyner graduated from Syracuse University in 1968 as a drama major and was an in-demand character actor by the early 1970s.

== Career ==
Wyner was introduced to producer Steven Bochco while appearing in Bochco's short-lived 1976 series, Delvecchio. This led to the role as Irwin Bernstein in Hill Street Blues, and to roles in four subsequent Bochco productions: Doogie Howser, M.D., Brooklyn South, NYPD Blue and L.A. Law. Additionally, Wyner has appeared on All in the Family as Dr. Shapiro Jr.; and the following programs for Hill Street's production company, MTM: Rhoda, The Bob Newhart Show, The White Shadow, WKRP in Cincinnati, M*A*S*H and Newhart.

== Filmography ==
- Willie Dynamite (1973) as court bailiff
- All the President's Men (1976) as Attorney #2
- The Bad News Bears (1976) as White Sox coach
- Dogs (1976) as Michael Fitzgerald
- Tail Gunner Joe (1977) as Roy Cohn
- The Bad News Bears Go to Japan (1978) as The Network Director
- Whose Life Is It Anyway? (1981) as Dr. Jacobs
- My Favorite Year (1982) as Myron Fein
- To Be or Not to Be (1983) as Ratkowski
- Fletch (1985) as Marvin Gillet (a.k.a. "Arnold T. Pants, Esq.")
- Wildcats (1986) as Principal Walker
- Spaceballs (1987) as Col. Sandurz
- Fletch Lives (1989) as Marvin Gillet
- The Postman (1997) as Benning Mayor
- The Devil's Advocate (1997) as Meisel
- Not Another Teen Movie (2001) as Principal Cornish
- American Pie 2 (2001) as the Camp Director
- How to Be a Serial Killer (2008) as Dr. Goldberg
- A Serious Man (2009) as Rabbi Nachtner
- Trouble with the Curve (2012) as Rosenbloom
- Armed Response (2013) as Rafferty
- Deadly Patient (2018) as Mr. Richards
- Spaceballs: The New One (2027) as Col. Sandurz

== Television ==
- The Odd Couple (1971) as Art Director
- Ironside (1972) as Tech Director / First Clerk
- Adam's Rib (1973)
- Columbo (1973) as Film Editor
- Rhoda (1974–1978) as Earl Goodwin
- Kojak (1974–1978) as Asst. DA Linnick / Sergeant Collins
- The Missiles Of October (1974) as a civilian aide
- The Bob Newhart Show (1975) as 'Flipper', Rex Pottinger / Rex Pottinger
- Ellery Queen (1975) as Joe Kemmelman
- Sanford and Son (1975) as Percy G. Hopweather
- McMillan & Wife (1975) as Frank Daniels
- The Rockford Files (1975–1977) as Stephen Kalifer / Max Steinberg / Brice / Strock
- Hawaii Five-O (1976) as Allen Sherick
- Baa Baa Black Sheep (1976) as Ben Farber
- Charlie's Angels (1976) as La Plante
- Quincy M.E. (1976–1980) as Allan Stuart / Assistant DA Glendon / Asst. DA Richard Feldman / Asst. City Controller Harold P. Marcus
- The Trial of Lee Harvey Oswald (1977)
- M*A*S*H (1978) as Cpl. Benson
- Emergency! (1978) as Doctor
- Kaz (1978–1979) as D.A. Frank Revko
- All in the Family (1979) as Dr. Sidney Shapiro
- WKRP in Cincinnati (1980) as D. Arnold Gonzer
- Alice (1980) as Marty
- Soap (1981) as Dr. Rudolph
- Nero Wolfe (1981) as Saul Panzer
- Hill Street Blues (1981–1987) as Irwin Bernstein
- Lou Grant (1981) as Jeff Benedict
- Cass Malloy (1982) as Deputy Max Rosenkrantz
- Matt Houston (1982–1985) as Murray Chase
- Fantasy Island (1984) as Dave the choreographer
- The A-Team (1984) as Richie Hauser
- Simon & Simon (1984) as Watson
- Hail to the Chief (1985) as Irving Metzman
- The Fall Guy (1986) as Henry Morris
- It's a Living (1986) as Ricardo Melon
- She's the Sheriff (1987–1989) as Deputy Max Rubin
- Murder, She Wrote (1988–1995) as Jim Kenton / Harcourt Fenton / Dr. Lewis
- The Famous Teddy Z (1989)
- Perfect Strangers (1989–1992) as Marvin Berman / Dr. Aldridge
- The Golden Girls (1990) as Dr. Norgan
- Quantum Leap (1991) as Ben Harris
- Man of the People (1991–1992) as Art Lurie
- Step by Step (1992) as Mel
- L.A. Law (1993) as Aaron Voss
- Good Advice (1993–1994) as Artie Cohen
- Married... with Children (1994) as Ronald N. Michaels
- Coach (1995) as Herb Spiegel
- Boy Meets World (1996) as Frank
- Murphy Brown (1997) as Dr. Anglund
- The Larry Sanders Show (1998) as Paul Fisher
- Walker, Texas Ranger (1998) as Dr. Jarred Buckler
- The Practice (1999) as Rabbi Stewart Lewis
- Malcolm & Eddie (1999) as Phil Easterwood
- Sabrina, the Teenage Witch (2000) as President
- Days of Our Lives (2001–2013) as Judge David Goldberg / Leon Stern / Judge Carlson
- Dharma & Greg (2002) as Herb
- Malcolm in the Middle (2002) as Foreman Fred
- Stargate SG-1 (2002) as Al Martell
- The West Wing (2003) as Congressman Simmel
- Nip/Tuck (2003) as Doctor
- Two and a Half Men (2003) as Sheldon
- Without a Trace (2004) as Hon. Francis Whitmire
- ER (2007–2008) as Rabbi
- Desperate Housewives (2007–2009) as Dr. Rushton
- Bones (2008) as Judge Marcus Haddoes
- The Mentalist (2009–2011) as Dr. Steiner
- House (2010) as Dr. Richardson
- Glee (2011) as Plastic Surgeon
- Retired at 35 (2011–2012) as Richard
- Melissa & Joey (2011–2014) as Judge Reuben Biddle
- Anger Management (2014) as Dr. Richter
- Friends with Better Lives (2014) as Dr. Gunderson
- NCIS (2015) as Randall Worthington
- Dr. Ken (2016) as Dicky Wexler
- The Big Bang Theory (2017) as Dr. Zane
- The Kominsky Method (2018) as Rabbi
- New Amsterdam (2018) as Rabbi Skillman; S1/E8: "Three Dots"
- Grace and Frankie (2021) as Rabbi Safchik
- Reboot (2022) as Bob
- A Million Little Things (2023) as Lonny Strobe; S5/E8: "Dear Diary"
- Station 19 (2024) as Morris Hapgood; S7/E6: "With So Little to Be Sure Of"
