= Borderlands: The Handsome Collection =

2015 video game

- Developer: Gearbox Software
- Publisher: 2K
- Series: Borderlands
- Engine: Unreal Engine 3
- Platforms: PlayStation 4; Windows; Xbox One; OS X; Nintendo Switch
- Release: NA: March 24, 2015; WW: March 27, 2015; Borderlands Legendary Collection: WW: May 28, 2020 (Xbox One); WW: May 29, 2020
- Genres: Action role-playing, first-person shooter
- Modes: Single-player, multiplayer

Borderlands: The Handsome Collection is a compilation of first-person shooter games developed by Gearbox Software and published by 2K. The Handsome Collection consists of both Borderlands 2 (2012) and Borderlands: The Pre-Sequel (2014) for PlayStation 4 and Xbox One, along with all of their accompanying downloadable content, enhanced local multiplayer, and the ability to transfer save data from their respective PlayStation 3 (Both Borderlands 2 & The Pre-Sequel)/Vita/PSVR and Xbox 360 versions. For The Handsome Collection, Borderlands 2 was ported by Iron Galaxy Studios and Borderlands: The Pre-Sequel by Armature Studio.

== Development and release ==
To maintain consistency with the previous installments in the franchise, Borderlands: The Pre-Sequel—a follow-up set between the first two games in Gearbox Software's Borderlands franchise developed by 2K Australia, was only released on PlayStation 3 and Xbox 360 consoles. In July 2014, prior to the game's release, 2K Australia's head Tony Lawrence reiterated that there was a possibility that The Pre-Sequel could be ported to PlayStation 4 and Xbox One—gauged by fan demand and sales.

In December 2014, it was reported that a game titled Borderlands Remastered Edition, which was presumed to be a Borderlands port to PlayStation 4 and Xbox One, had received a rating from the Australian Classification Board. No other details had been announced at that point. The discovery drew comparisons to other "remastered" ports of recent previous generation games to the consoles, including Tomb Raider, The Last of Us, fellow Take-Two Interactive title Grand Theft Auto V, and Halo: The Master Chief Collection.

The compilation was announced on January 20, 2015, as The Handsome Collection, for a release in North America on March 24, 2015, and elsewhere on March 27, 2015. A limited "Claptrap-in-a-Box" edition was also announced; this US$399 bundle includes lithographs of the playable characters from both games, a SteelBook case for the game, and a remote-controlled version of the robot character Claptrap; it can be controlled from an Android or iOS device using the "ClaptrApp", features a single wheel and gyroscopic stabilization, can play Claptrap's in-game quotes, and has a camera in its eye that can be viewed from within the app. Only 5,000 copies of this edition were produced.

The compilation does not include the first Borderlands: speaking at PAX South, Gearbox CEO Randy Pitchford stated that they may consider creating a port of the original game if The Handsome Collection is "wildly successful". Borderlands received a separate remaster for PS4 and Xbox One (as well as an accompanying update to the PC version on Steam) in 2019.

On March 18, 2015, Gearbox Software and 2K Games confirmed that the game had been declared gold, indicating it was being prepared for duplication and release.

On March 26, 2020, Nintendo announced that a port of The Handsome Collection will be released alongside Borderlands: Game of the Year Edition. It was released on May 29, 2020, both physically and digitally.

== Changes ==
Both games in The Handsome Collection feature remastered graphics, and are capable of running at 1080p resolution at 60 frames per second when playing with one or two local players. The games are also capable of local split-screen multiplayer with up to four players, rather than the two-player limit of the previous-generation versions; four-player mode will reduce the frame rate to 30 frames per second. On April 3, 2019, a patch was released to add 4K support for PlayStation 4 Pro and Xbox One X.

Save data from the previous-generation versions of 2 or The Pre-Sequel (including characters and Badass Rank) can be migrated to The Handsome Collection from the PlayStation 3 (both games support Cross-Save, as in which the PS4 version can carry over to the previous-generation version) and Vita (Borderlands 2 only) versions to PlayStation 4, and the Xbox 360 version to Xbox One. Both games include all of their respective downloadable content—such as campaigns and additional playable characters. Claptastic Voyage—a campaign for The Pre-Sequel that was released on the same day as The Handsome Collection, is not included on-disc, but is a free download.

== Reception ==
Reception

Aggregate score
Aggregator	Score
Metacritic	PS4: 82/100; XONE: 80/100

Review scores
Publication	Score
GamesRadar+	4/5
IGN	8.4/10

Borderlands: The Handsome Collection received positive reviews from critics. Aggregating review websites Metacritic gave the PlayStation 4 version 82/100 based on 49 reviews.

IGN gave the compilation an 8.4 out of 10, praising the performance of its Borderlands 2 port for being "rock solid". Some issues were noted, including that the inventory menu in four-player mode was not scaled to fit the smaller amount of screen space, The Pre-Sequel had inconsistent frame rates, and users are unable to switch between the two games without rebooting it entirely, concluding that "Minor quibbles aside, The Handsome Collection is a great package for any console-bound Borderlands fan." GamesRadar was also positive, praising the extent of content available, but criticized minor framerate issues and that no significant new features were added.
