= Claptrap =

Fictional robot from Borderlands

- Borderlands character
- First appearance: Borderlands (2009)
- Created by: Gearbox Software
- Voiced by: Various: David Eddings (Borderlands, Borderlands 2, Borderlands: The Pre-Sequel, Tales from the Borderlands) Jim Foronda (Borderlands 2 VR, Commander Lilith & the Fight for Sanctuary DLC, Borderlands 3, Tiny Tina's Wonderlands, Borderlands 4) Jack Black (film)

In-universe information
- Species: Model CL4P-TP Steward Bot

Claptrap is a character in the action role-playing game series Borderlands. He was introduced in the original Borderlands (2009), being an NPC in all games except Borderlands: The Pre-Sequel (2014), where he is a playable Vault Hunter.

Claptrap is considered the franchise's mascot, and often serves as comic relief throughout the series. Reception to the character has been mixed.

== Character development ==
Claptrap's development started from a random sketch in a low-level assignment made by the JIRA project-management software system. When Borderlands was first shown to the public in 2007, the game had a darker, more realistic visual style. In 2009 the game reappeared with a new look that Gearbox described as "concept art style", scrapping months of work for a style close to cel-shading, a style not often seen in the first-person shooter genre. Claptrap's original design, which GameSpot described as a "happy accident", was one of the few aspects that remained virtually unchanged throughout this process. Gearbox designer, Lorin Wood, created him as a personal challenge to create the most generic robot design he could. Inspired loosely on Pixar's Wall-E, and originally named "zippy," art director Brian Martel fell in love with the look and further developed his final conceptual design with Wood and 3D modeler Brent Hollon. Director Randy Pitchford was initially against the idea, feeling robot characters had become a cliché, but once he conceded, he told Martel "if we're gonna do it, he's gonna be the worst human being in the game", with an over-the-top and obnoxious personality, which he later compared to Captain Rex from the Star Tours ride. Pitchford would later state "the whole secret to that character is when he's fine and up, he's like insufferable and you just fucking hate him, and then what happens is that tears them down to a world, like, no one shows up to his birthday party, and then you're just like, you just feel sorry for him, and the second you give him an inch you regret it, you know, because he exploits that and becomes the worst asshole again".

Claptrap's role has been crucial in setting the tone for the Borderlands games. Since his first appearance his role has been expanded, from being a part of a general group of NPCs to a "franchise-centric character". After Borderlands 2, making him a playable character in Borderlands: The Pre-Sequel was considered the logical next step. The Pre-Sequel producer James Lopez said the crew decided to make "Fragtrap" a character more fitting for cooperative play with a special skill that made a solo run harder as "his whole thing is like action skill roulette" and if the chosen randomized skill was detrimental 'the rest of people can kind of like balance you out", and the best skills were also ones that improved a team as a whole. The game would even both mock the concept of playable Claptrap and highlight the character was not the easiest to handle by opening warning messages in the character select screen asking if the player really wants to choose Claptrap.

Claptrap was voiced by David Eddings in the first four Borderlands games, but was replaced by Jim Foronda since Borderlands 2 VR following a public falling-out between Eddings and Gearbox CEO Randy Pitchford. Eddings claimed that he was offered sub-standard rates for voicing the character in Borderlands 3, and accused Pitchford of assault. Pitchford denied the claims, and called Eddings "bitter and disgruntled" after being fired from Gearbox.

== Appearances ==
Claptrap first appeared in the original Borderlands game in 2009, including its DLC content such as The Secret Armory of General Knoxx and Claptrap's New Robot Revolution, and has appeared in every Borderlands game, spin-off and DLC since then. He makes a further appearance in Borderlands 2 as well as the DLCs including Sir Hammerlock's Big Game Hunt, Tiny Tina's Assault on Dragon Keep, and Commander Lilith & the Fight for Sanctuary. Claptrap's next appearance in Borderlands: The Pre-Sequel, released in 2014, features him as a playable character, with him additionally being featured as the central focus of its DLC Claptastic Voyage. Claptrap later returned in Borderlands 3, in which he introduces Pandora. In this game he gets upgraded, granting him the ability to climb stairs.

When asked by website VG247 what Hollywood actor could play Claptrap on-screen, Gearbox members suggested Dwayne Johnson or Bill Murray. Jack Black voiced Claptrap in the Borderlands film, released in 2024.

In non-Borderlands media, he has appeared in Fortnite as a purchasable pet and as part of a quest and makes an easter egg cameo in the video game Torchlight II and the film Ready Player One. Claptrap is also one of the player's opponents in the crossover game Poker Night 2. Joshua Derocher of Destructoid noted that because Claptrap vocalizes his thoughts and acts on impulse, he makes for a terrible poker player.

== Promotion and reception ==
A variety of merchandise has been made of Claptrap, portraying him as a talking car charger, Funko Pops, geek-themed controller holders, and a deluxe figure from McFarlane Toys, which Michael McWhertor of Kotaku praised for its detail.

Claptrap has evoked both strong positive and negative responses from fans and critics alike. Multiple journalists of PC Gamer expressed their opinions of Claptrap in an article dedicated to the character. Alyse Stanley of Rock Paper Shotgun described him as an annoying but beloved character, and Tom Sykes of PC Gamer acknowledged this divide in reception by referring to him as a "beloved/behated mascot". Chris Capel of GameRevolution described Claptrap as a slightly annoying mascot; Andy Kelly of PC Gamer said that "When he starts dancing and beatboxing I want to toss him in a car crusher then eject the resulting yellow cube into a wormhole that leads directly to the shit dimension, where everything's made of shit." Shaun Prescott stated that "Claptrap is more annoying than virtually every other character and dialogue line in every single Borderlands game." Christopher Livingston described him as "Not good, but I'm sure not the worst. But definitely one of the worst." Jody Macgregor wrote that after playing the first Borderlands game he hated Claptrap "just like everyone else", but started changing his mind after playing Borderlands 2, which he attributed to the improved writing for the character. Fraser Brown stated that Claptrap "is just a really loud Minion. Throw him in the bin." Wesley Fenlon claimed the character is "bad unless voiced by Keith David." Samuel Roberts claimed that "He wasn't bad until dubstep." Andrew Webster of The Verge claimed that Claptrap is one of the most obnoxious robots, and Jamie Latour of TheGamer argued that "Claptrap's whole schtick is being obnoxious, but even a self-aware joke runs its course after being in literally every game."

Despite the negative reception, Claptrap was voted as one of Borderlands' most popular characters by fans. Some video game journalists have also considered Claptrap to be one of the best and most iconic video game characters. Josh Hawkins of Shacknews wrote of the character that he is "by far one of the most beloved characters in the Borderlands series", and that playing as him in Borderlands The Pre-Sequel was a treat. When a fan of the Borderlands games contacted Gearbox to ask for his friend, who had recently died due to cancer and was a huge fan of the game to be eulogised by the character, Gearbox complied, and besides the eulogy also offered to add him as an NPC in Borderlands 2.

Claptrap won the Character of the Year award at the Spike Video Game Awards in 2012. During Claptrap's bounty challenge in the video game Poker Night 2, Claptrap bids with his Spike trophy. In 2013, Claptrap appearance in Borderlands 2 was a nomination on The Fannies, an annual award broadcast on Teletoon at Night, for "Best Dramatic Performance by a Robot".
