= How to Be a Serial Killer =

- Theatrical release poster
- Directed by: Luke Ricci
- Written by: Luke Ricci
- Produced by: Jason Dittmer; Todd Makurath; Luke Ricci
- Starring: Dameon Clarke; Matthew Gray Gubler; Laura Regan; George Wyner
- Narrated by: Shadoe Stevens
- Cinematography: Hernan Michael Otaño
- Edited by: Todd Makurath
- Music by: Nicholas O'Toole
- Distributed by: Monterey Media
- Release date: November 15, 2008 (NYC Horror Film Festival)
- Running time: 91 minutes
- Country: United States
- Language: English
- Budget: $2 million
- Box office: $899

How to Be a Serial Killer is a 2008 American black comedy crime horror film about a young serial killer who imparts his knowledge to an eager pupil. Written and directed by Luke Ricci, the film stars Dameon Clarke, Matthew Gray Gubler, Laura Regan, and George Wyner.

== Plot ==
Mike Wilson is a nice, charismatic, educated, and articulate young man who has found his life's purpose in exterminating people. Determined to spread his message about the joy of serial murder, Mike recruits a lost soul named Bart to be his pupil and leads his charge through the ethics of murder, as well as teaching him various lessons in disposing of corpses, balancing work and play, methods of killing, and many more. Mike and Bart's curriculum is interrupted when Mike's girlfriend Abigail discovers what's beneath her boyfriend's charming exterior and Mike and Bart must kill their way out of being discovered by the cops.

== Cast ==
- Shadoe Stevens as the narrator
- Dameon Clarke as Mike Wilson
- Matthew Gray Gubler as Bart
- Laura Regan as Abigail
- George Wyner as Dr. Goldberg
- Mary Jo Catlett as Mrs. Wilson
- Gonzalo Menendez as Officer Chavez
- Cameron Bender as Zach
- Douglas Dickerman as Rob

== See also ==
- Man Bites Dog
