= Handsome Jack =

Main antagonist of the Borderlands franchise

- Borderlands character
- Handsome Jack as depicted in Borderlands 2
- First appearance: Borderlands 2 (2012)
- Last appearance: Borderlands 3: Moxxi's Heist of the Handsome Jackpot (2019)
- Created by: Gearbox Software
- Voiced by: Dameon Clarke

Handsome Jack is a fictional character and one of the main antagonists of Gearbox Software's Borderlands video game series. He first appears in Borderlands 2, where he is the president of the Hyperion Corporation, which takes control of the planet Pandora. Jack shows narcissistic traits, believing himself to be a heroic character and savior of others. Jack was conceived early on as a fellow Vault Hunter "frenemy" before being changed to an outright villain to make Borderlands 2 clearer. Primary concerns fell on making him balance both the seriousness and humor of the game. The character is voiced by Dameon Clarke.

After his introduction in 2012's Borderlands 2, Jack appears again in Borderlands: The Pre-Sequel! and Telltale Games' Tales from the Borderlands. The Pre-Sequel! revolves around Jack's rise to power, while Tales features Jack as an AI who gets injected into the mind of one of the game's protagonists. In Borderlands 3, Jack appears in a voice cameo.

Handsome Jack has received critical acclaim. Clarke won "Best Performance by a Human Male" at the 2012 Spike Video Game Awards for his role.

== Character ==
Introduced as the president of the Hyperion Corporation, in his first appearance Jack and Hyperion have taken over the planet Pandora with Jack becoming a dictator, putting up propagandist posters of himself around the planet. Dialogue in Borderlands 2 establishes his past as a "code monkey", before taking credit for the Vault Hunters' actions in the first Borderlands. The character is depicted with two differently-colored eyes, giving him an asymmetrical design, as well as a mask of a face that covers his own.

Focused heavily on bravado and looking good, Handsome Jack considers himself "the hero" on Pandora, viewing everyone else on it as a "bandit". Jack is framed as believing everything he says, even his lies, including those regarding his treatment of his daughter, Angel, whom he essentially enslaves. Anthony Burch commented, "I think in Jack's mind, he's the protagonist in the cop movie where his daughter is killed and he goes on a rampage." Borderlands: The Pre-Sequel! establishes the character as initially having possibly good intentions, though ultimately becoming a villain. He also uses any chance he gets to insult the "filthy bandits" of Pandora.

== Conception and creation ==
Borderlands 2, in contrast to the first game, was created as a villain-centric story in the vein of System Shock 2, Portal and BioShock in order to both give the player a clear goal and a greater driving motivation. Gearbox hoped Jack would be a "one-stop-shop" for the narrative, being both the end goal and a way to remind the player of it, while still also entertaining them. Anthony Burch originally wrote Jack as a fellow Vault Hunter, a "frenemy" who would alternately help or hinder the player as they raced towards an ultimate goal, capitalizing on "moral ambiguity" to help make Jack a more interesting character. Mike Neumann suggested cutting this aspect, turning Jack into an outright villain. Jack's name was originally intended as a placeholder, and was a reference to Doctor Who character Jack Harkness.

The choice to make Jack a "self-styled hero" came in an attempt to underline the anti-heroic nature of the Vault Hunters, though the developers still wished for the Hunters to be "the good guys" by comparison. Bringing in Hyperion specifically was done due to a desire to tie Borderlands 2 with the original Borderlands, which ended with an image of Angel's Hyperion-branded satellite. Similarly, making Angel Jack's daughter allowed the stories of both games to have relevance to Jack and the current events of Borderlands 2.

Being Borderlands, Handsome Jack had to both be fun as well as being hated, needing to balance the seriousness and humor in the game. Jack's personality was initially based on a Nathan Fillion interview on Jimmy Kimmel Live!, where Fillion acted "charming and funny, but also slightly arrogant in a down-to-Earth kind of way".

In the first draft, Burch wrote Jack as joking constantly regardless of situation, including during the deaths of his daughter and girlfriend. Feedback from creative director Paul Hellquist, Neumann, and art director Jeramy Cooke led to rewrites, as they felt Jack seemed one-dimensional and his humor quickly grew tiresome. Neumann and Burch each did a pass through Jack's dialogue after Angel's death, now rephrased as Jack's "breaking point", removing some of the more silly lines Jack aimed at the player and making his dialogue angrier and darker with a "vengeful streak". In doing so, it was also hoped to give Jack an arc throughout the game, growing from treating the player characters as irrelevant to hating them.

One of the earliest concepts for Jack's design was that he'd look like the hero of a different game.

Dameon Clarke voices Handsome Jack. Clarke was asked to audition "by chance" after he finished recording session for Dragon Ball Kai in the same studio Okatron5000 and did as a favor to Chris Sabat. Clarke was initially intended to voice secondary characters in the game, but was asked to try for the role of Jack. Burch has said Clarke grasped the character "immediately", and soon began ad-libbing and improving lines.

Clarke found voicing Jack for Tales from the Borderlands a change of pace, due to the different versions of lines that could be given depending on player dialogue choice. Clarke was not informed of the game's plot details in advance of recording.

== Appearances ==
=== Borderlands 2 ===
"Hey! How -- oh, these pretzels suck... So, how's your day been, buddy? We haven't talked much since I left you for dead. Hey, you think you'll freeze to death out there? Nah, probably not. The bandits get you first. My day? It's been pretty good. I just bought a pony made of diamonds, because I'm rich. So, you know. That's cool. Kay, bye."

— First Handsome Jack taunt, of many in the game

In September 2012, Handsome Jack debuted in Borderlands 2. The character is introduced blowing up the train the Vault Hunters, the player characters, are on after luring them to the planet Pandora, with the ultimate goal of finding the next Vault and the power within it. Throughout the game, Jack will taunt the player through radio communications, interacting with the player in a manner Burch called similar to GLaDOS. His arc throughout the game is growing to hate the player, while the player's intended arc is to vice versa grow to hate him.

After surviving the train, the player is guided by the mysterious Guardian Angel from the first game to Sanctuary, the last refuge of the resistance against Jack and Hyperion. The player is initially intended to take Jack as "a funny, but ultimately harmless dick", evidenced by his early goofy taunts. Throughout the game, his "dickishness" is further and further heightened. Eventually, Mordecai, a player character in the first game turned an NPC ally in the second, reports that he's found a power core that could allow Sanctuary to fly safely in the air. The player retrieves it and with the help of Angel installs the core, but Angel is revealed to have been working for Jack, and the core instead sabotages Sanctuary's shields, leaving it to be almost destroyed by Jack's moonshot cannons from his space station orbiting Pandora, Helios, before Lilith the Siren teleports it away. Angel continues to help the Vault Hunters afterward, however, betraying Jack and revealing the Vault Key is with her. As the Vault Hunters prepare to raid the base Jack keeps Angel in, he captures Mordecai's pet bird Bloodwing, mutating her and then killing her after the player beats the bird in a boss fight. This moment is meant to be the first time Jack becomes a serious threat in the game.

The Vault Hunters find Angel's chambers, where they find out Jack—revealed to be her father—is using her Siren powers to charge the Vault Key, keeping Angel locked up and injected with a substance called Eridium to power her up. With Angel's help, the Hunters destroy the Eridium injectors and in the process kill her. Jack swears vengeance on the Hunters, who in turn do the same after he kills Roland and kidnaps Lilith to continue powering the Key. Eventually, Jack is faced in the Vault, and he takes control of the monster within it to fight the player. With his monster defeated, Jack is either killed by the Vault Hunters or Lilith.

=== Borderlands: The Pre-Sequel! ===
The Pre-Sequel!, set after the first Borderlands and before the second one, explores Jack's rise to power. Jack (also known as John) is introduced as a low-ranking programmer who, despite the animosity of Hyperion CEO Harold Tassiter towards him, has managed to obtain command of the Helios station. Jack intends to unlock a Vault on Pandora's moon Elpis, and to this end hires six Vault Hunters: Wilhelm, Nisha, Athena, Claptrap, Aurelia Hammerlock, and one of his body doubles, Timothy Lawrence. However, Helios is invaded by the Lost Legion, and Jack and the Vault Hunters are forced to evacuate to Elpis. The leader of the Lost Legion, Colonel Tungsteena Zarpedon, takes control of the Eye of Helios laser, and uses it to begin destroying Elpis, claiming that it is for the greater good. Jack begins a campaign to retake the station; he destroys a jamming signal disabling Helios' defense systems and confronts the corrupt Meriff of Concordia who was working for Zarpedon. Although Jack initially spares the Meriff, the Meriff shoots at him when his back is turned, leading Jack to kill him, now deciding that mercy is a weakness. Jack then creates a robot army, using the AI Felicity as its core, but the Vault Hunters are forced to destroy her when she becomes unwilling to be used as a weapon. With the aid of Mad Moxxi, Roland, and Lilith, Jack and the Vault Hunters then invade Helios Station, kill Zarpedon, and retake the station. However, Roland and Lilith betray the group at the behest of Moxxi, who believes that Jack is dangerous and not the hero he claims to be; they destroy the Eye of Helios and nearly kill Jack and the Vault Hunters. The group heads to the Elpis Vault to exact revenge. They enter the Vault, kill the alien Eridian guardians protecting it, and discover an ancient artifact. Jack uses the artifact and gains knowledge of a powerful Vault monster sealed in Pandora that will obey whoever unseals it. Lilith teleports in and punches the artifact into Jack's face, severely disfiguring him before disappearing; Jack proclaims his intention to take control of the monster and raze Pandora. He murders Tassiter, takes control of Hyperion, and renames himself Handsome Jack. Wilhelm and Nisha remain his top enforcers, Claptrap is betrayed, shot, and left for dead and his entire product line is wiped out, while Athena becomes disgusted with him and leaves his employ.

=== Tales from the Borderlands ===
Handsome Jack appears again in Tales from the Borderlands, an episodic game released between November 2014 to October 2015 which follows on from the events of Borderlands 2. He first appears at the end of the first episode as a hologram next to Rhys Strongfork, one of the two player characters in the game. The next episode explains his presence: Rhys, having retrieved a data file from the corpse of Professor Nakayama, who had attempted to revive Jack, has unknowingly uploaded an artificial intelligence version of the dead Hyperion leader into his mind. Jack can only be seen and heard by Rhys and cannot act physically except through the use of Rhys's cybernetic implants. At the end of the second episode, Rhys may either trust Jack or Fiona's plan to get out of a dangerous situation. In the third episode, if Rhys chooses to trust and befriend Jack he obtains further control of him. During episode four, Jack helps Rhys and his allies infiltrate Helios and tells him that an upgrade for the robot Gortys, which will help them find a new Vault on Pandora, is in his office. Once there, Jack offers Rhys to rule Hyperion together, asking him to plug him into the Hyperion computer network. The player may choose to accept Jack's offer or reject it; if the player accepts, Jack will make Rhys the new president of Hyperion, while if the player refuses Jack will forcibly take over Rhys' body and plug himself in. In the fifth and final episode, Jack attempts to kill Rhys by forcing a robotic endoskeleton into him to fully gain control of his body, but his plans are foiled when Rhys crashes Helios into Pandora. Afterward, Rhys finds Jack in the wreckage of the station, who lectures him about how there will always be sacrifices when it comes to success, lamenting that his past betrayals ultimately made him what he is today, and that he regrets ever coming to Pandora in the first place. Suddenly, Jack uploads himself back into Rhys' cybernetics and tries to kill him again by using his cybernetic arm to strangle him. Rhys removes all of his cybernetics to stop him, mutilating himself in the process, and either destroys Jack by crushing the piece of his robotic eye containing him or simply leaves him trapped inside it.

=== Borderlands 3 ===
In Borderlands 3, set years after the events of Tales from the Borderlands, a "Legendary" class type of gun called the "Handsome Jackhammer" can be found and collected by the player, which contains the AI Handsome Jack inside it. Jack's voice is also heard during the "Childhood's End" side mission, which explores the origin of Angel's Siren powers emerging during her childhood, her accidental killing of her mother, and Jack's subsequent imprisonment of her. Jack's legacy is also the focus of the first DLC add-on campaign "Moxxi's Heist of the Handsome Jackpot", which takes place on his former casino space station adorned with his image.

== Reception ==
Handsome Jack has been received well as a villain. The Escapist's Ron Whitaker listed Jack as one villain who "steals the show", praising his humor and taunts, as well as his fall to villainy in The Pre-Sequel!. The character was similarly placed twelfth on GamesRadar's list of top 100 video game villains, complimenting him as a "classic" villain. IGN's Seth Macy considered Jack one of "gaming's most crazy, diabolical villains", noting his "text-book narcissistic psychopathy" and how he blurred the line between "a shareholder's dream and a murderous sociopath with delusions of grandeur", while Sam Stewart of Game Informer likewise listed him seventh on a collection of "top 10 deranged video game villains". Also writing for GamesRadar, Lucas Sullivan placed Jack sixth on a list of top seven "villains we liked better than the hero", noting the build-up to killing him as he becomes "increasingly nuttier and deplorable", as well as how his remarks "grow on you". GamesRadar also included the character as the twelfth best video game character "of the generation". He was ranked as one of the best video game characters of the 2010s by Polygon staff and writer Cass Marshall, particularly his appearance and "Handsome Jack doesn’t have an arc or a greater point — he’s just a smug, theatrical jackass, and while he’s fun to hate, part of me cheered for him until the end." GamesRadar staff described Handsome Jack as the best villain in video games, stating that "Handsome Jack is a classic villain. Well-spoken, intelligent - even charming, in a way." TechRadar and Windows Central both included Handsome Jack on their best video game villain.

GamesTM listed the character as one "misunderstood" villain in gaming, calling him "just another example of what happens if you let your ego get the better of you." Clarke won "Best Performance by a Human Male" at the 2012 Spike Video Game Awards for his voicing of Jack.
