= Tales from the Borderlands =

Episodic video game

- Developer: Telltale Games (Note: Virtuos developed the Nintendo Switch version.)
- Publisher: Telltale Games (Note: 2K published the title's rerelease in 2021)
- Directors: Nick Herman; Jonathan Stauder; Ashley Ruhl; Martin Montgomery
- Producers: Sara Guinness; Mark Dickenson; Bryan Roth; Chris Schroyer; Cody Murry
- Designers: Mark Darin; Stephen McManus; Brian Freyermuth; John Bernhelm; Lula Lucent
- Programmers: Tulley Rafferty; Jason Kim; Carl Muckenhoupt; David R. Chaverri
- Artists: Dave Bogan; Leif Estes; Tara Rueping
- Writers: Pierre Shorette; Adam Hines; Jeremy Breslau; Chuck Jordan; Eric Stirpe; Anthony Burch; Zack Keller
- Composer: Jared Emerson-Johnson
- Series: Borderlands
- Engine: Telltale Tool
- Platforms: Microsoft Windows; PlayStation 3; PlayStation 4; Xbox One; OS X; Xbox 360; iOS; Android; Nintendo Switch
- Release: Episode 1: Microsoft Windows; WW: November 25, 2014 PS3, PS4; NA: November 25, 2014; EU: December 3, 2014 Xbox One; WW: November 26, 2014 OS X; WW: November 27, 2014 Xbox 360; WW: December 3, 2014 iOS; WW: December 11, 2014 Android; WW: December 17, 2014 Nintendo Switch; WW: March 23, 2021; Episode 2: Windows, OS X; WW: March 17, 2015 PS3, PS4; NA: March 17, 2015; EU: March 18, 2015 Xbox 360, Xbox One; WW: March 18, 2015 Android, iOS; WW: March 19, 2015 Nintendo Switch; WW: March 23, 2021; Episode 3: Windows, OS X; WW: June 23, 2015 PS3, PS4; NA: June 23, 2015; EU: June 24, 2015 Xbox 360, Xbox One; WW: June 24, 2015 Android, iOS; WW: June 25, 2015 Nintendo Switch; WW: March 23, 2021; Episode 4: Windows, OS X; WW: August 18, 2015 PS3, PS4; NA: August 18, 2015; EU: August 19, 2015 Xbox 360, Xbox One; WW: August 19, 2015 Android, iOS; WW: August 20, 2015 Nintendo Switch; WW: March 23, 2021; Episode 5: Win, OS X, PS3, PS4; WW: October 20, 2015 Xbox 360, Xbox One; WW: October 21, 2015 Android, iOS; WW: October 22, 2015 Nintendo Switch; WW: March 23, 2021
- Genres: Graphic adventure Interactive film
- Mode: Single-player

Tales from the Borderlands is a comedic interactive film based on the Borderlands series. It was developed by Telltale Games under license from Gearbox Software, the developer of the Borderlands series, and 2K, its publisher. The game was released in November 2014 for Android, iOS, Microsoft Windows, OS X, PlayStation 3, PlayStation 4, Xbox 360, Xbox One, and in 2021 for Nintendo Switch.

Set some time after the events of Borderlands 2, the game's story centers around Hyperion employee Rhys and Pandoran con-artist Fiona as they team up on an adventure to find and open a Vault. The game follows the episodic format that Telltale used for its titles The Walking Dead and The Wolf Among Us, where player choices and actions have somewhat significant effects on later story elements. Although the series received some criticism due to the aging game engine and repetition of gameplay from past Telltale Games, Tales from the Borderlands largely received critical acclaim. Particular praise was attributed to its strong characterization, emotional depth, creative setpieces, humorous writing and unexpected pathos.

Tales, like many of the other Telltale games, were pulled from sale following the studio's sudden closure in 2018. 2K Games was able to acquire the property and republished the series starting in February 2021. A successor, New Tales from the Borderlands, was released in October 2022.

== Gameplay ==
Tales from the Borderlands is an episodic point-and-click graphic adventure comedy. The graphic style of the game is similar to other Telltale titles. It was released in five episodes. The player is able to move the game's two playable characters, Rhys and Fiona, around the world's environment, interacting with different objects. Rhys has a cybernetic eye installed which enables him to scan items in the environments. The game also features several simple puzzles which involves players interacting with different items of interests.

Like the mainline Borderlands series, the game features a loot system in which players can collect cash scattered throughout the game's locations, which can be used to purchase items during certain points of the game. Gameplay mainly revolves around reacting to on-screen prompts and engaging in quick time events. In the game, players initiate conversation trees with non-player characters. Choices made by the player, which are often timed, influence story elements in future episodes, such as the player character's relationship with other characters.

== Setting and characters ==
Tales takes place in the Borderlands universe, primarily on the planet Pandora. Long-standing fables of a Vault containing vast treasures on Pandora have drawn numerous "Vault Hunters" to the planet, as well as the Hyperion corporation who maintain military-like control of the planet from an orbiting base named Helios. The game occurs after the events of Borderlands 2. It has been discovered that there are numerous other Vaults scattered throughout the galaxy, leading to a search for more Vault Keys that can open these new vaults.

The player separately controls the story's two protagonists Rhys Strongfork (Troy Baker) and Fiona Dillon (Laura Bailey). Rhys is a Hyperion employee, who has been working with his best friend Vaughn (Chris Hardwick) to get promoted into the higher ranks of the company but is stymied by his new boss and rival Hugo Vasquez (Patrick Warburton). Fiona is a con-artist working on Pandora along with her younger sister Sasha (Erin Yvette), both who learned under their mentor and father figure Felix (Norman Hall). The story explores how the characters came together, showing common events from the perspective of both characters in a manner called the "Big Fish version of what happened" by Telltale's Kevin Bruner. Other new characters in the game include Rhys and Vaughn's co-worker Yvette (Sola Bamis), black market fencer August (Nolan North), bandit leader Bossanova (Jason Topolski), a mysterious masked stranger (Roger L. Jackson), hooligans Finch (Dave Fennoy) and Kroger (Adam Harrington), bandit lord and August's mother Vallory (Susan Silo), Atlas scientist Cassius Leclemaine (Phil LaMarr), and the robot Gortys (Ashley Johnson).

In addition to original characters, the game also features returning characters from the main Borderlands games (voiced by the same actors from the previous games) including Handsome Jack (Dameon Clarke), who appears as an artificial intelligence injected into Rhys' mind, businesswoman Mad Moxxi (Brina Palencia), gun salesman Marcus Kincaid (Bruce DuBose), the Hyperion Loader Bot (Raison Varner), madman Shade (Brad Jackson), Hodunk clan leader Tector (Joel McDonald), mechanic Scooter (Mikey Neumann), junk dealer Janey Springs (Catherine Moore) and her girlfriend, ex-Atlas assassin Athena (Lydia Mackay), Vault Hunters Brick (Marcus M. Mauldin), Zer0 (Michael Turner), and Mordecai (Jason Liebrecht), and the robot Claptrap (David Eddings).

== Development ==
The concept of Tales bore out from the 2012 Spike Video Game Awards, according to Telltale's Steve Allison. Telltale and Gearbox had already worked together previously to bring Borderlands' Claptrap robot to Telltale's Poker Night 2. Representatives from both Telltale and Gearbox were present at the ceremony at adjoining tables, and over the course of the event, the idea of combining their respective talents on a project came out. Following the ceremony, Telltale and Gearbox began to explore the possibilities, realizing that the Borderlands universe had a large number of characters with interesting stories that Telltale could build upon, as well as continuing to explore fan-favorite characters that the series had developed. Gearbox noted that with the three prior Borderlands games, they had created an interesting universe but as a first-person shooter, the player's interaction with characters in that world was limited, and saw the potential in having Telltale expand upon their universe in a meaningful manner.

Voice actors from the previous Borderlands games returned to voice characters in this game, including Dameon Clarke as Handsome Jack and David Eddings as Claptrap. Troy Baker (originally Sam Witwer) and Laura Bailey voice the two central characters, Rhys and Fiona. Additional voice actors include Nolan North as August, Patrick Warburton as Hugo Vasquez, Chris Hardwick as Vaughn, and Erin Yvette as Sasha.

While Tales was critically well-received, the title had not met management's expectations for financial returns compared to its other properties like The Walking Dead. According to co-director Nick Herman, about halfway through the series' release, Telltale's management considered pulling the series so that they could reassign the staff to more lucrative projects, but the project leads worked out a deal to retain a skeleton staff to see the game out through its final episodes. Eurogamer's Jeffrey Matulef noted that the last episodes of the series seemed to be the best work that Telltale had done, likely as a result of those most committed to the project staying on as the skeleton staff. Because of the poor financial performance, Herman did not anticipate there would be a sequel to the series; however, a successor, New Tales from the Borderlands, was announced on August 23, 2022. Telltale's head of creative communications Job Stauffer refuted the sales figures and said that the sales were "not disappointing" but also that they were "not on the same level as The Walking Dead and Minecraft".

Telltale Games underwent a massive reduction in staff and ultimately closed in November 2018. Tales was one of several games that were pulled from digital storefronts in the wake of the liquidation of Telltale's assets. However, 2K Games stated in May 2019 that they are looking to take over the publishing rights to Tales as to bring it back to digital storefronts, as Skybound Entertainment had done for Telltale's The Walking Dead series. Following news that the Telltale brand had been revived in August 2019, one of Gearbox's writers for Borderlands 3, Sam Winkler, expressed interest in a potential Tales, though no plans had been confirmed.

Tales is considered canon to Gearbox, the events occurring between Borderlands 2 (released in 2012) and Borderlands 3 (released in 2019). To help bridge the gap, Gearbox released free DLC for Borderlands 2, Commander Lilith and the Fight for Sanctuary, in June 2019, which occurs following the events of Tales, after the crash of Helios Station onto Pandora. Vaughn and Cassius are both featured in the DLC. Both Rhys and Vaughn also appear as supporting characters in Borderlands 3.

Gearbox Software announced that they will be republishing Tales in digital form for Windows, PlayStation 4, and Xbox One as a single package containing all five episodes starting on February 17, 2021, with the only change being the absence of the comparison of the players' choice screens that were shown at the end of each episode.

On February 18, 2021, a Nintendo Switch version of Tales was announced, and was released on March 23, 2021.

== Episodes ==
The game was separated into five episodes, released in intervals. A physical disc-based release containing all five episodes was released on April 26, 2016, for personal computer and console versions.

No.	Title	Directed by	Written by	Original release date
1	"Zer0 Sum"	Nick Herman	Pierre Shorette and Adam Hines	November 25, 2014
The game opens in medias res: a stranger kidnaps Rhys and Fiona, and forces them to tell their shared story of the Gortys Project. Rhys, a Hyperion employee on the space station Helios, is demoted by Hugo Vasquez. Overhearing that Vasquez is purchasing a Vault Key from August, Rhys and Vaughn take a stolen briefcase of money to Pandora to buy it first. However, Rhys, Vaughn, and August discover the Key is a fake created by con artists Fiona and Sasha and their mentor Felix. The money is stolen by Bossanova, and Rhys, Vaughn, Fiona, Sasha, and Felix form a reluctant alliance to recover it. Rhys installs a Hyperion ID chip he retrieved from the dead body of Professor Nakayama into his cybernetics, hoping it will help locate the briefcase; he loses consciousness, but nothing else happens. Ultimately, they locate the money in an abandoned Atlas facility, and Felix takes it for himself. He triggers the briefcase's explosive lock, either dying or escaping depending on Fiona's choice. The others discover the Gortys core inside a secret chamber in the Atlas base. A hologram of Handsome Jack appears to Rhys and announces they have found the Gortys Project, which leads to a Vault.
2	"Atlas Mugged"	Jonathan Stauder	Pierre Shorette, Jeremy Breslau, Chuck Jordan, and Eric Stirpe	March 17, 2015
To learn more about the Gortys Project, the group sets off in Fiona and Sasha's caravan for another Atlas facility in the abandoned town of Old Haven. They are bombarded by Helios' moonshot cannon, and Rhys and Vaughn fall off the damaged caravan in their escape. As they trek through the desert, Rhys and Vaughn are confronted by Vasquez, and they escape him with help from Handsome Jack and Loader Bot. Fiona and Sasha detour to Hollow Point to have the mechanic Scooter repair the caravan. They visit Felix's home and discover Felix betrayed them to protect them from August's boss Vallory. Fiona and Sasha are attacked by Vallory's thugs, Finch and Kroger, and the Vault Hunter Athena, and they leave for Old Haven. At the town's Atlas facility, the group is ambushed by Vasquez and August, who force Fiona and Rhys to construct the Gortys unit. Rhys accidentally triggers the facility's security, and he must choose between trusting Fiona or Jack to get to safety.
3	"Catch a Ride"	Ashley Ruhl	Eric Stirpe, Pierre Shorette, Brian Freyermuth and Anthony Burch	June 23, 2015
Regardless if Rhys chooses to trust Fiona or Handsome Jack, the group successfully escapes August and Vasquez. However, they are cornered by Vallory and her minions outside the facility. She kills Vasquez and prepares to execute the others, but they are saved by Athena who forces Vallory, August, and their gang to retreat. Athena reveals she was secretly hired by Felix to protect and mentor Fiona and Sasha. Fiona activates the Gortys unit, which is revealed to be a robot. Gortys explains that Atlas created her to locate the teleporting Vault of the Traveler. However, Athena killed all of Atlas' employees on Pandora, leaving Gortys incomplete. They take Gortys to her next upgrade, and as they travel Rhys chooses to either trust and partner up with Jack or reject his offer. The group reaches an Atlas biodome and successfully retrieve the upgrade with limited aid from Cassius, an Atlas scientist, but are attacked and despite the team’s best efforts to escape, they are eventually captured by Vallory, a who hands off a defeated Athena to be taken away by Brick and Mordecai. Depending on Fiona's choice, Vaughn either escapes or is captured only to escape later. Gortys is forced by Vallory to reveal that her next upgrade is on Helios.
4	"Escape Plan Bravo"	Martin Montgomery	Jeremy Breslau, Pierre Shorette, and Anthony Burch	August 18, 2015
Vallory forces Rhys, Fiona, Sasha, Loader Bot, and Gortys to retrieve the upgrade from Handsome Jack's office on Helios or she'll kill them; she sends August, Finch, and Kroger to go with them. The caravan is converted into a spaceship by Scooter and Janey Springs to make the journey. Scooter accompanies them to Helios, but before they arrive, he sacrifices himself to prevent the caravan from exploding. Rhys infiltrates Helios disguised as Vasquez while Fiona impersonates a Hyperion tour guide. Though initially the plan is that Fiona infiltrates Jack's office, the security lockdown is accidentally triggered, forcing Rhys to enter it through a trapdoor beneath. He successfully retrieves the upgrade, and is offered control of Hyperion by Jack, which Rhys either accepts or declines. If Rhys accepts, he uploads Jack into Helios, and Jack announces Rhys as Hyperion's new president; if Rhys declines, Jack forces him to upload him into Helios and seizes control himself.
5	"The Vault of the Traveler"	Nick Herman	Pierre Shorette, Anthony Burch, and Zack Keller	October 20, 2015
Handsome Jack tries to take control of Rhys' body by grafting a robotic endoskeleton into him. Fiona, Sasha, and Gortys take the upgrade to Helios' hangar. To kill Jack, Rhys sends Helios on a collision course with Pandora. In the hangar, August, Finch, and Kroger betray Fiona and the others, revealing they planned to take only Gortys back to Pandora, willing to kill them anyway by Vallory’s orders. August has a change of heart and turns on them, but Fiona and Loader Bot are still left behind. Loader Bot sacrifices himself to ensure Rhys and Fiona get to the escape shuttles. In the wreckage of Helios, Jack downloads himself into Rhys' cybernetics and attempts to kill him. However, Rhys removes his cybernetics, and chooses to destroy Jack by crushing his eye implant or keep him imprisoned in it. Vallory uses the fully upgraded Gortys to open the Vault, but the monster protecting it, the Traveler, kills her. Gortys instructs Fiona and Sasha to destroy her, closing the Vault and banishing the monster. In the present, Vaughn, having become the leader of Helios' survivors, captures the stranger, revealed to be Loader Bot. Having survived Helios' crash, he witnessed Gortys' destruction and, feeling betrayed, rebuilt himself with Jack's endoskeletion to seek the truth. He asks the group to rebuild Gortys, kill the Traveler, and free Gortys of her fate. With aid from former associates (determined by the player's choices), the Traveler is killed. Rhys and Fiona enter the Vault; together, they open a chest and are teleported to an unknown location.

== Reception ==
Aggregate review scores
Game	Metacritic
Episode 1 – Zer0 Sum	PC: 84/100; PS4: 80/100; XONE: 82/100 iOS: 90/100
Episode 2 – Atlas Mugged	PC: 78/100; PS4: 81/100; XONE: 78/100
Episode 3 – Catch a Ride	PC: 81/100; PS4: 83/100; XONE: 65/100
Episode 4 – Escape Plan Bravo	PC: 79/100; PS4: 78/100
Episode 5 – The Vault of the Traveler	PC: 86/100; PS4: 90/100
A Telltale Game Series	PC: 85/100; PS4: 86/100; XONE: 88/100

Tales from the Borderlands received critical acclaim. Critics have praised it for its story, characters, action sequences, humor, choice driven gameplay, and faithfulness to the source material while criticism was mainly directed towards the game's graphical glitches.

=== Episode 1 – Zer0 Sum ===
Episode 1 – Zer0 Sum received "generally positive" reviews. Aggregating review website Metacritic gave the Microsoft Windows version 84/100 based on 43 reviews, the PlayStation 4 version 80/100 based on 15 reviews, and the Xbox One version 82/100 based on 8 reviews. The first episode was an honorable mention for Best Narrative for the 2015 Game Developers Choice Awards.

=== Episode 2 – Atlas Mugged ===
Episode 2 – Atlas Mugged received "generally positive" reviews. Metacritic gave the Microsoft Windows version 78/100 based on 38 reviews, the PlayStation 4 version 81/100 based on 11 reviews, and the Xbox One version 78/100 based on 5 reviews.

=== Episode 3 – Catch a Ride ===
Episode 3 – Catch a Ride received "generally positive" reviews. Metacritic gave the Microsoft Windows version 81/100 based on 24 reviews, the PlayStation 4 version 83/100 based on 12 reviews, and the Xbox One version 65/100 based on 6 reviews.

=== Episode 4 – Escape Plan Bravo ===
Episode 4 – Escape Plan Bravo received "generally positive" reviews. Metacritic gave the Microsoft Windows version 79/100 based on 27 reviews, and the PlayStation 4 version 78/100 based on 9 reviews.

=== Episode 5 – The Vault of the Traveler ===
Episode 5 – The Vault of the Traveler received "critical acclaim". Metacritic gave the Microsoft Windows version 86/100 based on 32 reviews, and the PlayStation 4 version 90/100 based on 7 reviews.

=== Awards ===
List of awards and nominations
Award	Category	Recipient(s) and nominee(s)	Result	Ref.
The Game Awards 2015	Best Narrative	Tales from the Borderlands	Nominated	
Hardcore Gamer's Best of 2015	Best Story	Tales from the Borderlands	Won	
Hardcore Gamer's Best of 2015	Best Licensed Soundtrack	Tales from the Borderlands	Won	
Hardcore Gamer's Best of 2015	Best Voice Acting	Tales from the Borderlands	Won	
Hardcore Gamer's Best of 2015	Best Surprise	Tales from the Borderlands	Won	
Hardcore Gamer's Best of 2015	Best Adventure Game	Tales from the Borderlands	Won	
Hardcore Gamer's Best of 2015	Best New Character	Gortys	Won	
Hardcore Gamer's Best of 2015	Best New Character	Loader Bot	Runner-Up	
Hardcore Gamer's Best of 2015	Game of the Year	Tales from the Borderlands	Won	
2015 NAVGTR Awards	Writing in a Comedy	TBD	Won	
2015 NAVGTR Awards	Game, Franchise Adventure	Noah Hughes	Nominated	
2015 NAVGTR Awards	Performance in a Comedy, Lead	Troy Baker	Won	
2015 NAVGTR Awards	Original Light Mix Score, Franchise	Jared Emerson-Johnson	Won	
2015 NAVGTR Awards	Performance in a Comedy, Supporting	Erin Yvette	Won	
19th Annual D.I.C.E. Awards	Outstanding Achievement in Story	Tales from the Borderlands	Nominated	

== Sequel ==
A successor developed by Gearbox Software and published by 2K Games, titled New Tales from the Borderlands, was released for Microsoft Windows, Nintendo Switch, PlayStation 4, PlayStation 5, Xbox One, and Xbox Series X/S on October 21, 2022.
