= Brothers in Arms 3: Sons of War =

2014 video game

- Developer: Gearbox Software
- Publisher: Gameloft
- Composer: Maxime Goulet
- Series: Brothers in Arms
- Platforms: iOS, Android, Windows Phone
- Release: iOS: WW: December 17, 2014; Android: WW: December 11, 2014
- Genres: Third-person shooter, action-adventure
- Modes: Single-player, multiplayer

Brothers in Arms 3: Sons of War is a 2014 World War II-era third-person shooter video game developed by Gameloft with partnership with Gearbox Software and published by Gameloft. It was released on December 17, 2014, for the iOS, Android and Windows Phone. The game serves as a sequel to Brothers in Arms: Hour of Heroes and Brothers in Arms 2: Global Front and it is still set during World War II. It is part of the Brothers in Arms series.

== Gameplay ==
Gameplay screenshot

Gameplay of Brothers in Arms 3: Sons of War is similar to its predecessors, though it differs drastically from Brothers in Arms 2: Global Front. Instead, the game is played from third-person perspective like the first installment, unlike the first-person gameplay of Brothers in Arms 2: Global Front. Player characters can drive Sherman tanks, throw grenades, reload, and shoot using virtual buttons on the touchscreen, and can control various tanks such as the American M4 Sherman Tank and the Soviet T-34.

Brothers in Arms 3: Sons of War introduces squads which can be upgraded or changed. They also share similar features to Frontline Commando 2, another third-person shooter game developed by Glu Mobile. The customization for this game has been expanded. The player could customize and upgrade their weapon to complement their style of gameplay. Additional weapons such as assault rifles, sniper rifles, shotguns, rocket launchers, pistols and knives can be bought from the shop. The player character can freely move across the level with a cover system. The graphics are improved compared to previous entries in the series.

The game also features side missions in which the player can unlock more weapons. Some enemy soldiers using an anti-air weapon can be found during side missions.

=== Brothers ===
Brothers are soldiers who fight along with the player. Their skills can be upgraded using dogtags or medals. They can be acquired during progress through the campaign missions (the story as Sergeant Wright). Certain Brothers can be acquired by winning VIP Events.

Different brothers have different abilities. For example, James Gann is a sniper and can shoot a particular target asked by the player, or Barnaby Adams who can call an air strike on request. Some brothers also have consumables like Cain Lawrence who has Molotov Cocktails or Larry Jackson who has a bazooka.

These abilities can be used only after a cool down period from the previous use.

== Plot ==
Brothers in Arms 3: Sons of War, just like the previous games in the Brothers in Arms series, is set during World War II. The main storyline is divided into 8 chapters.

The game begins in Normandy, 1944, with the protagonist, Sergeant Cole Wright, starting a diary of his experiences during the war. His squad was tasked to assault a forest village located in France to obtain enemy documents from an occupied manor. While they were able to find the files, one of Wright's brothers, Jacob Hall, was killed by an enemy sniper while escaping the area. Later in the game, he is unusable, and his icon shows that he was KIA. A month later, Wright was sent on a rescue mission, to find Rachelle Dubois known as "L'Hirondelle", a French Resistance fighter from enemy forces. With the assistance of his squad mates, Wright was able to rescue "L'Hirondelle" and her team. During the time together, the two fell in love with each other.

Wright then recalls being a part of the assault on Monte Cassino, Italy, back in January. His team was sent in to recover what's left of the failed initial strike team and complete the mission themselves. In addition, they were tasked to find and eliminate General Karl Herst, the leader of the forces in the area. During the mission, Wright rescues Cain Lawrence, a member of the original team, but could not save the others. Eventually, Wright spots Herst and attempts to pursue the general, but fails to take him out.

After the rescue of "L'Hirondelle", Wright's squad was ordered to stop an enemy convoy of reinforcements from reaching Falaise, France. Wright's squad disrupted their communications and diverted the enemy convoy to an ambush point. Wright and his squad were successful in their attack, stopping the convoy from reaching the city.

A few days earlier, Sergeant Wright's squad was ordered to infiltrate a Gestapo building in Paris to find information on POW camps for future rescue missions. However, the squad did not find anything and were forced to retreat from enemy reinforcements. The mission was not a total loss, however, as they were able to locate and capture General Alder and obtained the information from him. Several months later, Major Bastion, Wright's commanding officer, tells Wright that that Sam Foster, a fellow soldier that rescued him from captivity in 1942, was actually a mole. Previously, Wright was ambushed and captured due to poor intelligence, and Foster had rescued him. Wright's squad was sent to Belgium and tracked down Foster. Eventually, Wright killed Foster and reflects on the person he'd become, as he did not feel any regret for killing someone who had previously saved him.

In February 1945, months after, Sergeant Wright was sent to Trier, Germany, to stop a German "Vengeance-Weapon" Program from inflicting civilian casualties. His squad assaulted the facility and successfully destroyed the weapons, preventing them from being used. The following month, Bastion had finally tracked down General Herst, the same general that eluded Wright in Monte Cassino. Herst was found heading for Aalborg, Denmark, to a German outpost and bunker. Wright and his squad was able to ambush his convoy. Herst manages to retreat into the bunker, but bombers had bombarded it, causing it to fall apart. Wright, not wanting the general to escape again, chases in after him. After a brief chase, Wright kills the general outside the bunker. However, during his chase, Wright had also sustained wounds, and dies shortly after.

Chapter 9, the last chapter of the game, focuses on a different protagonist. On March 14, 1944, another soldier was dispatched from Major Bastion to Cherbourg, one year before Wright‘s death. He was sent to secure precious stolen pictures from the enemies. At first, he could not believe that he and his squad had to do it, but he promised to secure them. After planting C4 mines to secure the path, he pushed through the harbour of the city with his squad, fighting through the German troops in the harbour. Finally, he secures the pictures with his squad who support him, and they reach the extraction point successfully, leaving Cherbourg.

== El Guettar expansion ==
Before the player could play the free expansion, it was obligatory to acquire an anti-tank weapon such as the PTRD-41 (known as Degtyaryov in game) via the in game shop.

The unnamed soldier from chapter 9 was sent to El Guettar on March 18, 1943, prior to the Cherbourg Mission to occupy El Guettar, as the Germans left the city in a quick rush, leaving behind little garrison. The Squad and some tanks managed to hold the city for a couple of days, but on March 23, a Counterattack from the Nazis caught them cold, so they thought that they would not make it. A few hours later, after they survived the first wave of the counterattack, they needed to repair the anti-air guns, as the enemy had sabotaged them prior. They have made it through, quickly repairing and shooting down the bomber aircraft. Another wave of Germans attacked and manages to overrun the first defence line with tanks and flamethrowers. The soldier commands the soldiers to hold their position, until eventually, support arrived and the Germans fled.

== Development ==
The game was announced at E3 2013 by Gameloft and was unveiled as a cross-over of a cover-based shooter and an on-rails shooter. It was revealed that the game will be on Apple devices and iOS. In 2015, several updates were launched, adding multiplayer, tanks, and the El Guettar expansion to the game. In late 2022, the game was removed from all platforms and could not be downloaded anymore, as Gameloft stated that they wanted to focus on other games and end the active development. On 4 Mar 2025, multiplayer mode was removed, players can no longer battle with other players, while singleplayer was not affected.

== Reception ==
Reception

Aggregate score
Aggregator	Score
Metacritic	60/100

Review scores
Publication	Score
Pocket Gamer	2.5/5
TouchArcade	3.5/5

The game has a score of 60% on Metacritic. TouchArcade awarded it a score of 3.5 out of five, saying "the simple fact that even this review spends so much time on explaining the systems means to me that the game focuses less on gameplay and more on monetization, which is a shame." Pocket Gamer awarded it a score of 5 out of 10, saying: "But with such consistent, nagging, and exhausting requests for my money, I find the whole thing about as much fun as a month in Colditz."
