= Brothers in Arms: D-Day =

2006 video game

- Developers: Gearbox Software; Ubisoft Shanghai
- Publisher: Ubisoft
- Series: Brothers in Arms
- Engine: Unreal Engine 2
- Platform: PlayStation Portable
- Release: NA: December 5, 2006; AU: December 7, 2006; EU: December 8, 2006
- Genre: First-person shooter
- Modes: Single-player, multiplayer

Brothers in Arms: D-Day is a first-person shooter video game in the Brothers in Arms series for the PlayStation Portable. It uses the Unreal Engine 2 as its technology base. Though labeled as a spin-off, the game's plot is actually a crossover/compilation of Brothers in Arms: Road to Hill 30 and Brothers in Arms: Earned in Blood from the main series.

== Gameplay ==
Brothers in Arms: D-Day takes the player through the Normandy campaign and like its predecessors follows Sgt. Matthew Baker and Cpl. (later Sgt.) Joe Hartstock through actual missions that took place in Normandy during June 1944 from the June 6th airborne invasion to St Sauveur-le-Vicomte. Also like Brothers in Arms: Road to Hill 30 and Brothers in Arms: Earned in Blood it gives the chance for the player to take control of a squad allowing the player to issue orders and decide the best way to assault the enemy. BIA: D-Day also offers a wide range of both German and American authentic World War II weapons.

Much like the first two Brothers in Arms games, D-Day heavily focuses on commanding a squad to suppress then flank an enemy force with head-on assaults usually resulting in disaster. The game additionally uses intelligent opponents who will try to outmaneuver the player, although the AI in D-Day is not as advanced as the earlier PC/console versions of the game.

== Reception ==
Reception

Aggregate score
Aggregator	Score
Metacritic	65/100

Review scores
Publication	Score
Eurogamer	7/10
GamePro	2.75/5
GameSpot	5.9/10
GamesRadar+	3.5/5
GameZone	7/10
IGN	6.4/10
PlayStation Official Magazine – UK	6/10
PlayStation: The Official Magazine	5.5/10
VideoGamer.com	7/10
X-Play	4/5

Brothers in Arms: D-Day received "mixed or average" reviews, according to review aggregator platform Metacritic.
