= Brothers in Arms DS =

2007 video game

- Developer: Gameloft
- Publisher: Ubisoft
- Producer: Philippe Laurens
- Designer: Alexandru Adam
- Programmer: Dragos Iftimi
- Artist: Arthur Hugot
- Composer: Romain Gauthier
- Series: Brothers in Arms
- Platform: Nintendo DS
- Release: AU: June 7, 2007; EU: June 8, 2007; NA: June 21, 2007
- Genre: Third-person shooter
- Modes: Single-player, multiplayer

Brothers in Arms DS is a third-person shooter video game developed by Gameloft and published by Ubisoft for the Nintendo DS. It is part of the Brothers in Arms series established by Gearbox's Brothers in Arms: Road to Hill 30. In 2008, it was ported to the iOS as Brothers in Arms: Hour of Heroes by Gameloft and to the N-Gage QD as Brothers in Arms.

== Overview ==
Gameplay screenshot from the N-Gage port

The player takes on the role of Corporal Bernard "Barney" Hill in the 101st Airborne Division, fighting in Tunisia, Normandy and the Ardennes during World War 2. The gameplay involves being either on foot, in a tank, or in a combat vehicle.

== Reception ==
Reception

Aggregate score
Aggregator	Score
Metacritic	72/100

Review scores
Publication	Score
Eurogamer	6/10
Game Informer	6.75/10
GameSpot	6/10
GameSpy	3/5
GameZone	7/10
IGN	8/10
Nintendo Power	9/10
PALGN	6.5/10
VideoGamer.com	6/10
X-Play	3/5

Brothers in Arms DS received "mixed or average" reviews, according to review aggregator platform Metacritic.
