= CX Markets =

- Industry: Finance
- Headquarters: New York City, United States
- Area served: United States
- Services: Designated contract market
- Owner: Cantor Fitzgerald
- Website: www.cxmarkets.com

CX Futures Exchange, L.P. (also called CXMarkets, and Cantor Exchange) is a designated contract market offering financial products related to forex and weather. It operates in conjunction with a sister company CX Clearinghouse as a subsidiary of Cantor Fitzgerald. Through various platforms under the CXMarkets umbrella, speculators and hedgers can make trades based on the exchange rate of currencies through binary options, as well as predictions on weather, such as where tropical storms will make landfall, snowfall amounts, rainfall amounts, and high and low temperatures.

As of the close of trading on March 29, 2019, the exchange discontinued listing of forex and gold binary options instruments until further notice.

== History ==
In 2008, financial services firm Cantor Fitzgerald filed for federal regulatory approval for a new commodities venue called the Cantor Exchange. The aim was to turn its Hollywood Stock Exchange (HSX), a simulation game which had been operating for over a decade, into an actual money exchange which would allow individuals or institutions to buy and sell contracts based on motion picture box office revenue.

In February 2010, it was announced that CFTC approval was expected, and the following month the Cantor Exchange would officially begin trading futures contracts on domestic box office receipts.

The exchange would allow every film to have a tradable "share" whose value would end based on the four-week opening box office revenue. Speculators and hedgers could buy or sell contracts in effort to profit or hedge against loss based on a film's financial performance.

Before its debut, movie executives expressed concern the existence of such an exchange would create yet another facet to take into account when assessing projects.
