= Mikey Neumann =

American YouTuber (born 1982)

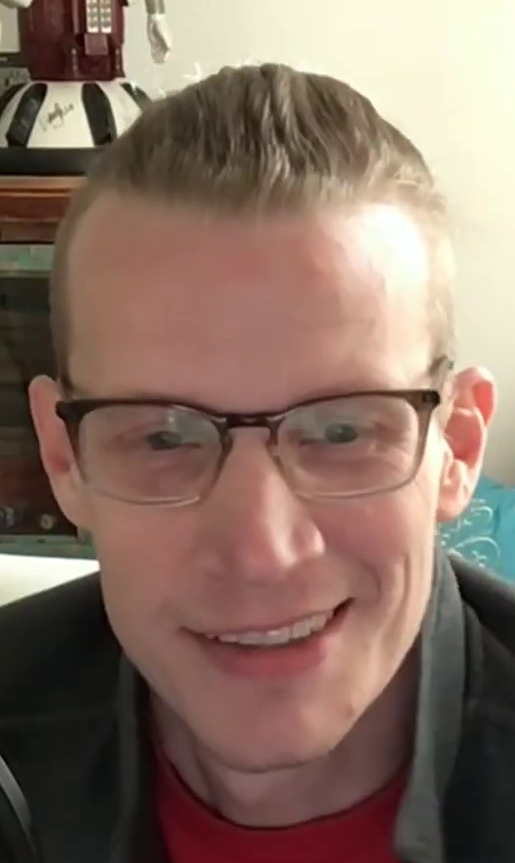
- Neumann in 2025
- Born: April 16, 1982 (age 44)

YouTube information
- Channel: FilmJoy
- Years active: 2013–present
- Genre: Film criticism
- Subscribers: 299 thousand
- Views: 26.42 million
- Last updated: August 26, 2026

Mikey Neumann (born April 16, 1982) is an American YouTuber and video game writer. He is known for the channel FilmJoy, which hosts film criticism series Movies with Mikey. The series celebrates the positive elements of movies, and was nominated for the Outstanding Informational Series or Special Emmy in 2017.

Before his work on YouTube, Neumann worked in the video game industry as a creative director and on games including Brothers in Arms, Borderlands, and Borderlands 2. He worked at Gearbox Software for 16 years, ultimately earning the title "chief creative champion" before departing the company because of health problems.

== Career ==
=== Video games ===
Neumann began working in the video game industry at the age of 19. He left college after one year to do quality assurance on Gearbox Software's PlayStation 2 port of Half-Life, becoming a full-time texture artist in 2001, a year later. He went on to write, voice act, and serve as creative director or associate creative director for games including the Brothers in Arms series, Aliens: Colonial Marines, and Borderlands. For Borderlands, Neumann provided motion capture and voiced the character Scooter. He also wrote comics for the series, including the prequel Borderlands: Origins.

When pre-orders for Borderlands became available, Neumann tweeted "Twitter me a screen of you buying the game and I'll play BLs with you and give you loot." When the tweet was picked up by gaming news website Kotaku, the popularity of the tweet exploded, with more than 200 players tweeting their game receipts. As a result, Neumann spent more than 3 days playing the game, grouping up with each player and giving them in-game weapons. In 2014, Neumann gave the keynote talk at PAX Prime. Alongside developers from other game studios, he created a card for Magic 2015, titled Chasm Skulker.

In 2016 Neumann, then in the position of 'chief creative champion', was announced as the lead writer on the upcoming Borderlands 3. He left Gearbox Software in June 2017, before the game's release, as a result of ongoing health problems, saying that "Everything is 1,000,000% amicable with Gearbox. I physically just can't do the work anymore", and opened a Patreon account to crowdfund his YouTube videos. Neumann later assisted with the Borderlands 3 trailer.

=== YouTube ===
In 2010, Neumann created a web series alongside Anthony Burch called Anthony Saves The World. He started a film criticism series titled Movies with Mikey in 2014 on the Chainsawsuit Original YouTube channel (now titled FilmJoy) in collaboration with Kris Straub. The videos focus on the positive elements of movies, celebrating and highlighting aspects of those movies Neumann enjoyed. He described the impetus for the series as a desire for people "to feel good about the things they like, as opposed to feeling attacked all the time" and he aims to bring something new to viewers' opinion of the film, such as framing John Wick in a mythological context. After leaving Gearbox Software in 2017, Neumann began funding the series via Patreon as he worked to become a full-time YouTuber. 5 days after his Patreon opened, more than 1,300 fans were pledging money each month to fund his videos.

Neumann envisioned Movies with Mikey as being focused on films that were reviewed negatively in the 1990s and 2000s, providing viewers with a deeper appreciation for them. When the first videos received few views, he refocused the series. His video on The World's End received considerably more attention, including being shared and commented on by the film's director and cast. Movies with Mikey has since covered movies and television shows, including 10 Cloverfield Lane, Princess Mononoke, and Stranger Things. The series was nominated for an Emmy in 2017, in the Outstanding Informational Series or Special category.

== Personal life ==
Neumann had a stroke while playing games at the Gearbox Software office in October 2011, resulting in him being hospitalized for nine days. Doctors diagnosed Neumann with multiple sclerosis. Following auto-immune failure as a result of his condition, Neumann was hospitalized again in 2017.

Neumann has identified as asexual.

== Works ==
Year	Game	Role
2005	Brothers in Arms: Road to Hill 30	Writer; voice of Corporal Sam Corrion
2005	Brothers in Arms: Earned in Blood	Writer and Story Director; voice of Corporal Sam Corrion
2007	Brothers in Arms: Hell's Highway	Writer; Voice of Corporal Sam Corrion
2009	Borderlands	Writer; voice of Scooter
2012	Borderlands 2	Co-writer and Creative Director; voice of Scooter
2013	Aliens: Colonial Marines	Writer
2013	Poker Night 2	Voice of Steve the Bandit
2014	Tales from the Borderlands	Scooter
2022	Night of the Coconut	Cameo as self
