= Borderlands (video game) =

2009 video game

- Cover art featuring a Psycho Bandit
- Developer: Gearbox Software (Note: Blind Squirrel Games developed the Game of the Year Enhanced edition.)
- Publisher: 2K
- Producers: Simon Hurley; Stephen Palmer
- Designer: Matthew Armstrong
- Programmers: Steven Jones; Patrick Deupree; Jimmy Sieben
- Artists: Brian Martel; Jennifer Wildes; Jim Sanders
- Writers: Allison Berryman; Mikey Neumann; Randy Pitchford; Simon Hurley
- Composers: Sascha Dikiciyan; Cris Velasco; Jesper Kyd; Raison Varner
- Series: Borderlands
- Engine: Unreal Engine 3
- Platforms: PlayStation 3; Xbox 360; Microsoft Windows; Mac OS X; PlayStation 4; Xbox One; Nintendo Switch
- Release: PlayStation 3, Xbox 360: NA: October 20, 2009; PAL: October 23, 2009; Microsoft Windows: NA: October 26, 2009; PAL: October 30, 2009; OS X: WW: December 3, 2010; PlayStation 4, Xbox One: WW: April 3, 2019; Nintendo Switch: WW: May 29, 2020
- Genres: Action role-playing, first-person shooter
- Modes: Single-player, multiplayer

Borderlands is a 2009 action role-playing first-person shooter video game developed by Gearbox Software and published by 2K. It is the first game in the Borderlands series. The game was released worldwide in 23 October 2009 for the PlayStation 3, Xbox 360 and Microsoft Windows, with a Mac OS X version being released on December 3, 2010, by Feral Interactive. The game's story focuses on a group of four "Vault Hunters", who travel to the distant planet of Pandora to search for the "Vault", which is rumored to contain advanced alien technology and other priceless riches. The hunters piece together clues to find the Vault while battling the savage wildlife of Pandora, local bandits that populate the planet, and ultimately band together to prevent the Atlas Corporation and its corporate military from reaching the Vault first.

The game features the ability to explore the in-game world, and complete both main missions and optional side quests, either in single-player or online cooperative gameplay, with the latter providing additional options for duels and competitive PVP matches in designated areas. Gameplay features include access to various weapons and shields that vary in type and statistics, weapons with special elemental functions, each playable character having distinctive class types and unique abilities for combat, upgradable skills, and the use of two-person vehicles. The game itself is rendered in cartoon-style graphics, to provide greater detail on weapons and environments, and was inspired by action role-playing games of the time, such as Ultima and Diablo.

Borderlands sold over two million units by the end of 2009. It is considered to be one of the greatest and most influential video games ever made. Its success spawned four DLCs—The Zombie Island of Dr. Ned in November 2009, Mad Moxxi's Underdome Riot in December 2009, The Secret Armory of General Knoxx in February 2010, and Claptrap's New Robot Revolution in September 2010, four follow-ups, Borderlands 2 in September 2012, Borderlands: The Pre-Sequel in October 2014, Borderlands 3 in September 2019, and Borderlands 4 in September 2025, as well as a feature film adaptation released in August 2024. A remastered version titled Borderlands Game of the Year Enhanced for Microsoft Windows, PlayStation 4 and Xbox One— was released on April 3, 2019, which features graphical enhancements, and gameplay improvements backported from Borderlands 2. The remastered version was released for the Nintendo Switch alongside Borderlands 2 and Borderlands: The Pre-Sequel as part of the Borderlands Legendary Collection in May 2020.

== Gameplay ==
Lilith, the siren (left) and Mordecai, the hunter (far right) prepare to attack the Rakk Hive, one of the enemies in the game.

Borderlands includes character-building elements found in role-playing games, leading the developer Gearbox Software to call the game a "role-playing shooter". At the start of the game, players select one of four characters, each with a unique special skill and with proficiencies with certain weapons. From then on, players take on missions assigned through non-player characters or from bounty boards, each typically rewarding the player with experience points, money, and sometimes a reward item. Players earn experience by killing both human and non-human foes and completing in-game challenges (such as getting a certain number of kills using a specific type of weapon). As they gain levels from experience growth, players can then allocate skill points into a skill tree that features three distinct specializations of the base character; for example, Mordecai can become specialized in sniping, gunslinging with revolvers, or using his pet Bloodwing to assist in kills and health boosting. Players can distribute points among any of the specializations, and can spend an amount of in-game money to redistribute their skill points.

Players start the game with the ability to equip two weapons and later gain up to four weapon slots, as well as slots for an energy shield, a grenade modification, and a class modification. Items collected can be sold back at vendors for money that then can be used to buy better items. One of the key features of Borderlands is the randomly generated weapons and items created either as dropped by enemies, found in storage chests about the game, on the ground, sold at vendors in the game, or as quest reward items. The game uses a "Procedural Content Creation System" to create these weapons and items, which can alter their firepower, rate of fire, and accuracy, add in elemental effects such as a chance to set foes on fire or cover them in burning acid, and at times other special bonuses such as regenerating the player's ammo. A color-coded scale is used to indicate the rarity of the weapon or item. According to Gearbox developers, the random system could generate around 16-17 million variations of weapons. The Procedural system is also used to create the characteristic of random enemies that the player may face. This allows for enemies of the same species to have widely varying attacks: for example, variations of "spiderants" in the game could leap around and would jump onto players' faces, while another variant can roll up into a ball and attack people, depending on the content generator.

When in combat, the player can take damage if their shield is depleted, affecting their health. If they lose all their health, they must either wait to be revived by another player or attempt to kill an enemy to achieve a "second wind", or otherwise will be regenerated back at the last "New-U" station that they passed, losing a 'ratio-appropriate' percentage of their money in the process. Players quickly gain access to two-passenger vehicles, and can engage in vehicular combat with other enemies. Eventually, a system of fast transit points between the game world is available to the player; until then, players must walk or drive between areas to get around.

The game can be played alone, but also supports two-player cooperative play through split-screen (on consoles), and up to four players playing cooperatively online or over LAN. The game follows the progress of the host player, rewarding the other active players for completion of quests for their characters. If the other players are doing the same quests in their campaign, the completed quests remain the same in their campaign as well as the host's. When more players are present, the game alters the statistics of the generated enemies, balancing the game due to the larger number of players. Players can take part in one-on-one duels anywhere in the game world, or can visit arenas in the game world to participate in free-for-all, 2-on-2 or 3-on-1 combat battles with their fellow players. The original title as shipped for Windows used GameSpy servers for multiplayer modes; as a result of GameSpy's shutdown in 2013, 2K Games patched the game and moved the servers to Steam, as well as providing Steam activations of the game for those that purchased the title through retail channels.

== Synopsis ==
=== Setting ===
Borderlands is set in the distant future at a time when various mega-corporations seek control of planets to colonize and mine for their mineral wealth and resources. Prior to the events of the game, the Atlas Corporation, one of the major mega-corporations, uncovered an ancient alien Vault filled with advanced weapons technology, left behind by an ancient alien race known as the Eridians, which allowed them to rapidly overtake their competitors. Finding similar ruins of the same alien architecture on the planet Pandora, Atlas sought to settle the planet in hopes of finding more alien technology, but were forced to abandon their plans due to a failure to find any alien technology on the surface, and being unprepared for the dangerous wildlife coming out during their stay. After their departure, the Dahl Corporation, another mega-corporation, colonized the planet to secure its vast deposits of minerals, using large amounts of convict labor for the mining operations, while initiating their own search for a Vault.

Their research team's efforts to find the Vault were headed up by Patricia Tannis, a respected xenoarchaeologist. Despite losing all of her colleagues to the planet's wildlife and being driven partially insane herself, Tannis found proof that a Vault does exist on Pandora. Her news was intercepted by Atlas, who sent its private military force, the Crimson Lance, to kidnap Tannis and get the Vault's location from her. Faced with their invasion, Dahl abandoned the planet, taking only the wealthy colonists with them, and leaving the remaining population to scavenge for a living amongst the barren wastelands and industrial trash heaps across the planet. To make matters worse, the convict labor was allowed to go free, leading them to form clans of bandits that terrorize the local populace. Despite the circumstances, the Vault and its rewards transformed into a legend that attracts mercenary "Vault Hunters" to the planet.

=== Characters ===
There are four playable characters featured in the game for players to choose from: Brick – a large, powerful man, who operates as a Berserker; Lilith – a woman with powerful alien abilities, operating as a Siren; Mordecai – a skilled marksman with an avian companion named Bloodwing, operating as a Hunter; and Roland – a former member of the Crimson Lance, operating as a Soldier. Each character's class defines the style of weaponry they specialise in, along with the unique skill they can use – Brick can enter a rage state for increased melee strength and a short period of health regeneration; Lilith can turn invisible to enemies, moving much faster in this state, and capable of shock blasts when entering and exiting this state; Mordecai can call his companion to attack enemies in his crosshairs; and Roland can utilize an automated turret to take on enemies, and provide additional cover.

=== Plot ===
Borderlands begins some time after the Dahl Corporation's abandonment of the planet Pandora. Four Vault Hunters (Brick, Lilith, Mordecai, and Roland) arrive in search of the fabled Vault. After arriving to the town of Fyrestone, the Vault Hunters begin to receive psychic instructions from a mysterious woman known as the "Guardian Angel". The Vault Hunters meet a CL4P-TP or "Claptrap" robot and a doctor named Zed who help them establish a reputation by killing several bandit leaders, eventually leading to the collection of an alien artifact, being the first piece of a key needed to open the Vault. This causes Patricia Tannis, Dahl's former xenoarchaeologist still in residence on the planet, to contact the Vault Hunters, revealing that the Vault can only be accessed once every 200 years and that the time of the next opening is approaching. Tannis also explains that three more artifacts are needed to complete the Vault Key. Meanwhile, Commandant Steele of the Crimson Lance (a well-outfitted military force led by the Atlas Corporation) threatens to declare martial law and demands the Vault Key pieces.

The Vault Hunters secure the second and third pieces by following Tannis' instructions, but the final piece, supposedly in the possession of a bandit lord named Baron Flynt, turns out not to be where it was expected. Steele contacts the Vault Hunters to reveal that there are in fact only three pieces and that Tannis has betrayed and misled them. Steele then disables the planet's ECHO network, preventing further communication with the Guardian Angel and anyone else. The Vault Hunters infiltrate the Crimson Lance's headquarters and find Tannis imprisoned. She claims she was forced into betrayal and urges the Vault Hunters to restart the ECHO network and stop Steele and the Crimson Lance before they reach the Vault. After restoring the network, the Guardian Angel directs the Vault Hunters toward Steele's location. During the final approach to the Vault, the Vault Hunters encounter Crimson Lance forces already locked in combat with the Vault's alien Guardians.

The Vault Hunters finally arrive at the Vault only moments too late to stop Steele from using the Key. When the Vault opens, a giant monster emerges and wipes out Steele and the rest of her troops. The Guardian Angel explains that the monster is called the "Destroyer" and was imprisoned in the Vault long ago by the Eridians, the alien race who left behind the ruins and created the Vault, in order to prevent the destruction of the universe, and that the Guardians were posted to prevent anyone from opening it. Although the Vault Hunters kill the Destroyer, the Vault is re-sealed for another 200 years. The Guardian Angel is revealed to be transmitting her signals through a Hyperion satellite in orbit high above Pandora. The game ends with the satellite sending a signal to a Claptrap robot on the planet, changing it into an "Interplanetary Ninja Assassin" (continued in the plot of the DLC Claptrap's New Robot Revolution).

== Development ==
Gearbox's Randy Pitchford said that the idea of Borderlands was inspired both being an avid role-playing game (RPG) fan, including roguelikes such as NetHack and action role-playing games like Ultima and Diablo, and being drawn into first-person shooters (FPS) that he worked on in his early career, including Duke Nukem 3D. He recognized that the core gameplay loops for both genres are at different time scales; whereas the core loop for a role-playing game is long in terms of leveling up characters, a shooter has a much shorter one in moving and shooting to clear out a new area. Pitchford felt these two loops were not mutually exclusive due to the different time scales, and believed some type of fusion could be made from the two genres, thus forming the basis of Borderlands. He even said that the title invoked that, defining "Borderlands" as "that uncomfortable place between two other places that that is weird and messy but also but actually awesome and cool", which fit the game's blend of shooter and RPG, while also being a "weird mix between sci-fi and Western". Pitchford recognized this could be a risk, but went ahead anyway: in a 2017 interview, Pitchford recounted that industry analyst Michael Pachter had believed Borderlands was going to be a failure, as players that would want to play a role-playing game or a shooter would more than likely play a game dedicated to that genre instead of the hybrid. After the Borderlands series had sold more than 30 million copies, Pachter admitted to Pitchford that he had been wrong.

Gearbox did not have the narrative defined at the onset of development for Borderlands, but needed to find some reason to have the player feel rewarded about killing enemies and collecting loot from them. As they developed the game further, they came to the idea of casting the player as a "vault hunter", so that looting equipment and other items would be "kind of virtuous". This led to the Pandora narrative, since the act of opening a vault or box to obtain potentially disastrous results was compared to the mythological Pandora's box.

The game's development started around 2005, internally pitched as "Halo meets Diablo". The initial period involved Pitchford selling his team on the idea of the FPS-RPG hybrid, and eventually determining that the FPS genre would be the defining genre for the game. The game's art style was initially more realistic, with visual ideas inspired partially by the Gears of War and Mass Effect series. The team expanded and prepared for releasing the game's first public reveal in September 2007 via a Game Informer cover story, with trailers to be shown in the following year's E3 and other game conventions, building atop a modified Unreal Engine 3. Elements that were planned at the time of that cover story but that did not make the final game included procedurally generated "loot caves", and the ability to hire non-playable character mercenaries to help in combat. Further, the game initially had three Vault hunters; Brick had not been included yet, as Gearbox thought that it would be interesting in the co-op to have two or more players playing the same characters but with persistent improvements that the players had made to them.

Internal teams, assembled to give Gearbox's projects a critical review, started cautioning the team that at this stage, as they felt Borderlands was beginning to look much closer to the then-recent Fallout 3 or Rage games. The realistic look, which gave much of the visuals a brown, muted color palette, clashed with some of the more fantastical elements they had included at that point, such as extraordinary jump heights and the vehicle systems. By this point, the game was 75% complete and there was a target release window they wanted to reach, so scrapping major elements of the game was not an option for the studio. According to chief creative officer Brian Martel, they opted to try to find their "purple cow", some visual element that would make the game stand out and gain sales. Martel and a small team spent some time in secret to create prototype of the game using an art style similar to cel shading, fearing that if they had said anything to the other team members, there may have been discontentment among the staff. Pitchford would later acknowledge that this new style was not wholly original to Gearbox and was partially inspired by Ben Hibon's short film Codehunters. Hibon has stated that while he was contacted by Gearbox to possibly work on artwork for Borderlands, nothing ever came of the talks. The style itself appears as cel-shaded comic book artwork, but is rendered using a combination of hand-drawn textures with engine modifications to outline major features, creating the comic book appearance.

When the new style was revealed to both Gearbox and 2K Games, nearly everyone was pleased with it. However, the game's original art director was so disappointed with having her work discarded that she left the company and the video game industry altogether. The style was refined further with the help of a comic book artist. Most of the rest of the elements of the game, such as the type and variety of enemies, were kept as is; the skill trees, initially filled with more mundane abilities, were repopulated with applies inspired by magic systems from RPGs, such as healing bullets, embracing the more extreme aspects of the game. Other shortcuts were taken to complete the game in a timely manner such as reusing systems from other Gearbox games, and adjusting the narrative and setting to simplify the end product, such as having Pandora's moon in a fixed location so they could create dramatic shadows for the various levels.

The change did still delay their initially planned release in 2008 into 2009, with Gearbox showing off the new style by May of that year. Late into production, writer Mikey Neumann suggested adding a song to the opening sequence, showing Pitchford a mock-up scored with a Bob Dylan song. Pitchford liked the idea, but thinking they would not get Dylan given his resistance to licensing his music, he suggested a band he had recently discovered on the radio, Cage the Elephant, and after playing "Ain't No Rest for the Wicked" alongside the introduction, the crew set on adding the song.

== Marketing and release ==
=== Retail editions ===
Borderlands was released in three separate editions:

- The standard edition includes the game disc and instruction manual.
- A retail pack containing the first two episodes of Borderlands downloadable content: The Zombie Island of Doctor Ned and Mad Moxxi's Underdome Riot was released on February 23, 2010, in North America.
- The first "Game of the Year Edition", released on October 12, 2010, in North America, included the original Borderlands game, one-time use vouchers for all four of the downloadable content packs, and a hand drawn bonus map. Players who bought this edition gained access to the Duke Nukem Forever First Access Club, granting them exclusive items, including early access to the Duke Nukem Forever playable demo before it was publicly released. The second "Game of the Year Edition" includes all 4 of the DLCs on a second disc on Xbox 360, and on the same disc on PlayStation 3.

=== Downloadable content ===
==== The Zombie Island of Dr. Ned ====
The Zombie Island of Dr. Ned is the first installment of downloadable content (DLC) for Borderlands and includes new quests, items, and enemies—including WereSkags and various zombies. The storyline takes place in an area known as Jakobs Cove which is a small town built by the Jakobs Corporation. Dr. Ned had been in charge of keeping the workers of Jakobs Cove alive, but ended up transforming them into zombies. The main plot revolves around finding previous visitors to Jakobs Cove and investigating Dr. Ned himself after the Jakobs Corporation become suspicious of his work. The playable area includes a large outdoor map with several further areas branched from the main zone—including a dark, abandoned version of previous area 'Old Haven'. The installment was released for the Xbox 360 and PlayStation 3 versions on November 24, 2009, which was celebrated with a trailer. The PC version was released via Steam with SecuROM on December 9, 2009.

==== Mad Moxxi's Underdome Riot ====
Mad Moxxi's Underdome Riot is the second piece of DLC for Borderlands. It features three new riot arenas (Hellburbia, the Gully, and Angelic Ruins) and storage for players' items. The plot of the DLC is Moxxi, a crazed lover who is setting out to find her 4th husband, leading her to make the arenas in the DLC. Players fight several of the game's enemies, including bosses, in arenas. No experience is gained from killing enemies in the arena battles, but experience can be gained from completing challenges or quests in the arena. New game modes are added, such as low gravity fighting, enemy health regeneration, and shieldless fighting. It was released on December 29, 2009, for the Xbox 360 and was released January 7, 2010, for the PlayStation 3 and PC.

==== The Secret Armory of General Knoxx ====
The Secret Armory of General Knoxx was unofficially announced on January 21, 2010, via the official Gearbox forums, posted by Gearbox level designer Jason Reiss saying the pack will increase the level cap to level 61, and is "the biggest DLC we have made". A tweet by Gearbox creative director Mike Neumann on January 21, 2010, said the pack would also include "more Scooter", who is a character in the game. This was followed by an official announcement from Gearbox on January 29, 2010, confirming the release, level cap increase, brand new weapons, and "brutal, never-before-seen enemies in a huge new environment complete with tons of brand new missions."

The plot of this DLC revolves around Athena (a former Atlas agent who is self-described as the best), who has tired of Atlas' lies and wants to bring them to their knees, and General Knoxx (Steele's superior), a man with extreme loathing for his job, who is tasked to destroy Athena and the protagonist(s). Along the way Moxxi aids the player in taking on Atlas in exchange for help with her ex-husband issues, and Scooter, who reveals he is related to Moxxi. The DLC package became available February 23 for Xbox 360, and February 25 for PlayStation 3 and PC.

==== Claptrap's New Robot Revolution ====
On March 3, 2010, 2K officially announced a fourth piece of downloadable content, stating that they will "continue to support the title with more add-on content, and our approach to digital content for Borderlands gives [Take-Two] a road map for other titles going forward." On July 15, 2010, General Knoxx's Twitter page was updated for the first time in months, stating that he had "new orders (sent from the future)" On July 30, 2010, Randy Pitchford, co-founder of Gearbox Software and current CEO, announced via Twitter regarding the content "I get a LOT of questions about more DLC for Borderlands. Yes, more is coming! T2 already said so! Let's talk soon :)" On August 5, 2010, a long list of content that was supposedly going to be included in the content was posted on the Gearbox Forums by forum user Legendrew. The data was gathered from files in the 1.31 update for the PC version of Borderlands.

On August 11, 2010, 2K confirmed the title of the content, Claptrap's New Robot Revolution, and its main premise. The story focuses on a rogue army of brainwashed Claptraps (led by CL4P-TP, Interplanetary Ninja Assassin, the same Claptrap that is seen getting struck by lightning just after the end credits of the main game) who plan to destroy humanity for their mistreatment, along with an army of Borderlands enemies transformed into Claptrap styles (i.e., Crab-Traps, Rakk-Traps, and Skag-Traps). On September 5, 2010, Pitchford announced at the Penny Arcade Expo that the release date was scheduled for September 28, 2010. Pitchford also announced a free patch to increase the level cap by 8 for all players (to a maximum of Level 69, or 58 for those without Knoxx's Armory), regardless of whether the expansion had been purchased.

=== Remastered version ===
In conjunction with the announcement of Borderlands 3 in March 2019, Gearbox announced Borderlands Game of the Year Enhanced, a remastered version of Borderlands co-developed by Blind Squirrel Games, who previously worked with 2K on BioShock: The Collection, for PlayStation 4, Xbox One, and Windows (as a free upgrade to the original version of the game on Steam). In addition to 4K resolution textures and HDR support, the enhanced version backported improvements from Borderlands 2—such as replacing the compass display with a minimap, additional character customization options, and four-player split-screen multiplayer on console, as well as changes to the game's final boss fight. On March 26, 2020, 2K and Gearbox announced that the remastered version would be released alongside Borderlands 2 and Borderlands: The Pre-Sequel for the Nintendo Switch as part of the Borderlands Legendary Collection on May 29, 2020.

== Reception ==
=== Critical reception ===
Reception

Aggregate score
Aggregator	Score
Metacritic	PS3: 83/100; X360: 84/100; PC: 81/100; PS4: 76/100; XONE: 80/100

Review scores
Publication	Score
1Up.com	B+
Game Informer	9.25/10
GamePro	4.5/5
GameSpot	X360/PC: 8.5/10; PS3: 8.0/10
GameSpy	4/5
GameTrailers	8.4/10
Giant Bomb	4/5
IGN	8.8/10
Official Xbox Magazine (US)	8.5/10
TeamXbox	9.0/10

Borderlands received positive reviews. Aggregating review website Metacritic gave the Xbox 360 version 84/100, the PlayStation 3 version 83/100, and the PC version 81/100. In late 2011, Borderlands was named 35th on IGN's Top 100 Modern Video Games list.

Jeff Gerstmann from Giant Bomb gave Borderlands 4 stars out of 5, called it a successful loot-driven first-person shooter "where plenty of other Diablo-inspired games have failed miserably", but criticized the "paper-thin story" and the predictable AI. Charles Onyett from IGN awarded Borderlands an 8.8/10 and an Editor's Choice Award. He noted that fans of RPGs would enjoy the streamlined item management, and treasure hunting, but criticized the lack of character skills. With "beautiful visuals, tried and true RPG mechanics, and solid first-person-shooter gameplay", Onyett felt that the game was very enjoyable. 1Up.com's Thierry Nguyen gave the game a B+ praising the multiplayer experience and stated: "Call it a first-person Diablo, an evolution of Resistance 2's co-op mode, Monster Hunter for the west, or a party game for FPS gamers. Call it the best example of the transformative power of multiplayer. Whatever you designate it, Borderlands is a decent single-player FPS/RPG that simply becomes great -- when playing with others. RPGLand's Ivan Taran gave it a rating of "Great" and the game went on to win the site's Xbox 360 Game of the Year award, and be named the Runner-up for overall Game of the Year 2009, losing out to Demon's Souls. During the 13th Annual Interactive Achievement Awards, the Academy of Interactive Arts & Sciences nominated Borderlands for "Role-Playing/Massively Multiplayer Game of the Year" and "Outstanding Achievement in Online Gameplay".

=== Sales ===
In late August 2009, Electronic Entertainment Design and Research analyst Jesse Divnich said "Borderlands could very well surprise the market and consumers as BioShock did in 2007." By December 2009, the game had sold over 2 million copies according to Take-Two Interactive's financial report. By February 2010, the number had risen to 3 million. By August 2011, the game had sold 4.5 million units worldwide.

== Sequel ==
A sequel, Borderlands 2, was announced on August 2, 2011, for the PlayStation 3, Xbox 360, and Windows platforms. The game was also developed by Gearbox Software and distributed by Take-Two Interactive, and was released on September 18, 2012. The game features many technical improvements and follows four new Vault Hunters (six with the downloadable characters added later) on Pandora as they battle Handsome Jack and the Hyperion Corporation.
