= Harry Harrison (architect) =

American architect

Harry Harrison was an architect in Los Angeles, California.

He designed the Modern Architecture style Chips coffee shop, an example of Googie Architecture. Harrison also design the Ritts Furniture building on Santa Monica Boulevard east of La Cienega Boulevard. It is now being used as the Hollywood Stock Exchange headquarters. Harrison also designed 1120 St Ives Place (1948) in Los Angeles for Hyman Engleberg, Marilyn Monroe's personal doctor. He worked with Harwell Hamilton Harris and Richard Neutra.
