= Brothers in Arms: Hell's Highway =

2008 video game

- Developer: Gearbox Software
- Publisher: Ubisoft
- Director: Jeramy Cooke
- Producer: Mike Wardell
- Programmer: Neil Johnson
- Writer: Mike Neumann
- Composers: Ed Lima; Duncan Watt
- Series: Brothers in Arms
- Engine: Unreal Engine 3
- Platforms: PlayStation 3, Xbox 360, Microsoft Windows
- Release: PlayStation 3 & Xbox 360: NA: September 23, 2008; AU: September 25, 2008; EU: September 26, 2008; Microsoft Windows: NA: October 7, 2008; AU: October 9, 2008; EU: October 10, 2008
- Genres: First-person shooter, tactical shooter
- Modes: Single-player, multiplayer

Brothers in Arms: Hell's Highway is a 2008 tactical first-person shooter video game developed by Gearbox Software and published by Ubisoft for PlayStation 3, Xbox 360 and Microsoft Windows. It is the third installment in the Brothers in Arms series.

The game follows the men of the 101st Airborne Division (502nd Parachute Infantry Regiment) in the later stages of World War II during Operation Market Garden in the Netherlands, with the player returning to the role of Staff Sergeant Matt Baker (based on Harrison C. Summers) from the previous titles in the Brothers in Arms series.

== Gameplay ==
Brothers in Arms: Hell's Highway is a World War II-themed tactical shooter played primarily from a first-person perspective. The game features a cover system, which allows players to strategically hide behind objects while fighting enemies, and alternates the player's view to an over-the-shoulder perspective, similar to a third-person shooter.

The object of Hell's Highway is to guide player character Staff Sgt. Matthew Baker and the squads under his command as they complete objectives during Operation Market Garden. In campaign mode, players must complete a series of levels that encompass Hell's Highway's storyline. The player can select from three levels of difficulty: Casual, Veteran, and Authentic. Completing the campaign grants players access to Authentic difficulty, which increases the enemy's accuracy and disables the heads-up display (HUD), as well as the player's crosshairs.

Combat in Hell's Highway is squad-based and retains much of the gameplay from its predecessors. The player has direct control of Baker while the squad members are controlled by the game's artificial intelligence. As players progress throughout the storyline, a maximum of three squads may accompany them into the battlefield. Three squad variations are available, each with their own strengths and weaknesses; for example, fire teams are proficient in suppressing the enemy, while assault teams are preferred for flanking maneuvers. The player may issue commands to the squads, such as sending them to take cover or focus their fire on an enemy position. A red circle above enemies shows when they are a threat. When the player issues an order for suppressive fire, the circle turns grey, indicating an opportunity for the player or squad to move to an improved flanking position.

Hell's Highway features a destructible cover system, allowing objects such as wooden fences and sandbags to be destroyed by gunfire or explosives. Unlike the previous entries in the series, a regenerating health system is present, justified as representing a character's exposure to "threat" rather than resilience to damage: when the player's character is exposed to enemy fire, the screen turns red and blurry. If he remains under fire, he will eventually be hit and killed. Remaining safe from enemy fire will quickly remove "threat". Gameplay also introduces the "action camera" feature which sometimes momentarily slows down time when a player kills an enemy with a headshot or grenade.

== Release ==
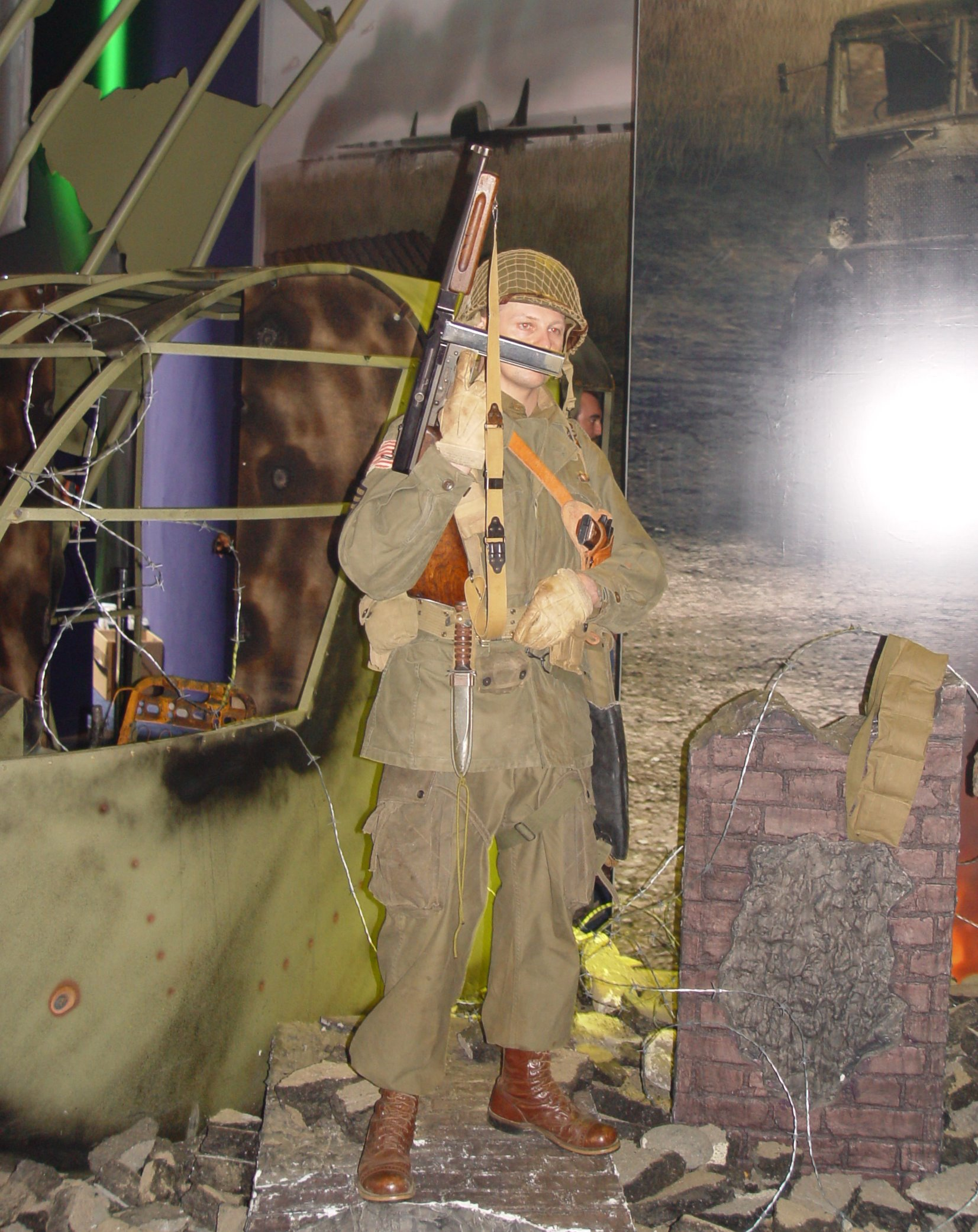
Promotion at E3 2006

The game was officially released in 2008 for the PlayStation 3 and Xbox 360 on September 23 in North America, September 25 in Australia and September 26 in Europe. The Microsoft Windows version was released two weeks later, on October 7. It was made available on Steam the next day.

Gearbox officially presented special, limited-edition version of the game which included a 6-inch Sergeant Matt Baker figure with 13 accessories, a blister pack holding the figure and accessories, a 32-page Brothers in Arms First Edition comic book, a full-color map of Operation Market Garden, special packaging, and 2 more playable multiplayer characters.

== Story ==
Recently promoted Staff Sergeant Matt Baker is constantly haunted by events in Normandy that led to the deaths of Privates Garnett and Allen, and deceased Private Leggett's involvement. Baker's best friend, Staff Sergeant Joe Hartsock, commands the 2nd squad of Baker's unit as they prepare for Operation Market Garden, a high-risk Airborne operation intended to "Win the War by Christmas." Baker's unit receives replacements, including fresh arrival Private Franky LaRoche, and transferred English replacement PFC Dawson. Meanwhile, Corporal Sam Corrion is frustrated that he has constantly been passed over for promotion; as a test, LaRoche is put under his command.

Baker's unit safely arrives in the Netherlands on gliders and meets up with Dutch resistance member Nicolaas, who provides reconnaissance information. Baker then meets up with 1st Sgt. Mac Hassey, and after assisting some crashed gliders, links up with the 506th Regiment of the 101st Airborne, commanded by Colonel Sink. Baker's unit fights to take the Son bridge, but it is demolished by the German forces, delaying the operation. Baker's unit is then assigned to take the town of Eindhoven, where they eliminate a German sniper and artillery emplacements. Soon after, Baker's unit clears a path for British tanks, and Baker finds Nicolaas’ missing son Pieter. As the citizens of Eindhoven celebrate, Baker reunites Nicolaas with his son, and LaRoche falls in love with a Dutch girl.

That night, the Luftwaffe bombs Eindhoven. Baker's unit fights into the burning rubble and meets with Hartsock's squad. Meanwhile, LaRoche leaves to rescue the Dutch girl despite Corrion's attempts to stop him. They find that 2nd squad has taken casualties from a sniper, and immediately after, Corporal Paddock shows up with Pieter's corpse, who was killed alongside his father in a collapsing building. Baker leads the unit through the ruins as German forces attempt to secure the town. Afterwards, they find LaRoche leading the Dutch girl to safety through a burning building, and Baker follows them inside, but gets disoriented by the flames and ends up jumping through a window into a river. When he regains consciousness, he finds himself near an abandoned hospital. He witnesses the Dutch girl be executed by the Germans, and later finds a dying LaRoche inside the building. Hartsock manages to find them and leads a distraught Baker back through the hospital. Immediately after Baker enters a lecture hall, he is knocked down as a bomb gets caught in the skylight's metal frame. Baker then hallucinates and shoots at Germans standing above him, concerning Hartsock.

The unit leaves Eindhoven and meets with Hassey in Oedenrode, bringing up their concerns over Baker. The unit then moves to Veghel, which they defend with help from British tanks. Hartsock tries to get Baker to admit his problems when they meet in a cafe, but the squad is suddenly hit by a mortar; Baker suffers a facial wound, while Hartsock is grievously wounded and rendered unconscious. Following this, Baker chooses Paddock over Corrion to lead 2nd squad, leading to a confrontation between the two where Baker blames Corrion for LaRoche's death.

Afterwards, the unit is deployed to Hell's Highway, where they are immediately ambushed; Corrion is shot and evacuated to an aid station. After the battle, Dawson confronts Baker and tells him that he had met Leggett in Carentan and threatens Baker to reveal the truth or Dawson himself will. After being prompted by Paddock's guilt following his unintentional prediction of their squadmates dying, Baker finally confesses to the unit that Allen and Garnett were ambushed as Leggett idly watched. Baker's unit then clears out German artillery emplacements in one last assault to clear an exit for the Allied soldiers. Following the assault, they learn that Market Garden has failed, and caused over 17,000 Allied casualties. At a triage station, Baker learns that Hartsock is paralyzed and being sent home to his family and is ostracized by Corrion.

Now on the verge of emotional breakdown, Baker hallucinates a conversation with Leggett, hinting at the upcoming Battle of the Bulge. Baker pulls himself together and, with newfound determination, makes a passionate speech to his unit to raise their spirits, saying that he will continue to lead them until the end.

=== Novelization ===
Brothers in Arms: Hell's Highway was published by Presidio Press as a companion novel for the video game by the video game's historical director, Colonel John Antal, who served in the United States Army and retired after 30 years.

== Reception ==
Reception

Aggregate score
Aggregator	Score		
Aggregator	PC	PS3	Xbox 360
Metacritic	79/100	76/100	76/100

Review scores
Publication	Score		
Publication	PC	PS3	Xbox 360
Edge	6/10	6/10	6/10
Eurogamer	N/A	N/A	7/10
Game Informer	N/A	7.75/10	7.75/10
GamePro	N/A	N/A	4/5
GameRevolution	N/A	C+	C+
GameSpot	8.5/10	8.5/10	8.5/10
GameSpy	N/A	N/A	4/5
GameTrailers	N/A	N/A	8.3/10
GameZone	8/10	8/10	8.2/10
Giant Bomb	N/A	4/5	4/5
IGN	7.9/10	7.6/10	7.6/10
Official Xbox Magazine (US)	N/A	N/A	9/10
PC Gamer (US)	93%	N/A	N/A
PlayStation: The Official Magazine	N/A	3.5/5	N/A

Brothers in Arms: Hell's Highway received "generally favorable" reviews, according to review aggregator platform Metacritic.

During the 12th Annual Interactive Achievement Awards, the Academy of Interactive Arts & Sciences nominated Brothers in Arms: Hell's Highway for "Outstanding Achievement in Original Story".
