= Brothers in Arms: Double Time =

2008 video game

- Developer: Gearbox Software
- Publisher: Ubisoft
- Series: Brothers in Arms
- Engine: Unreal Engine 2
- Platforms: Wii, OS X
- Release: Wii: NA: September 23, 2008; AU: September 25, 2008; EU: September 26, 2008; OS X: NA: April 16, 2010
- Genres: First-person shooter, tactical shooter
- Modes: Single-player, multiplayer

Brothers in Arms: Double Time is a first-person shooter video game compilation released for the Wii in 2008 and OS X in 2010. It is a compilation of the first two Brothers in Arms games, Brothers in Arms: Road to Hill 30 (2005) and Brothers in Arms: Earned in Blood (2005), and was developed by Gearbox Software and published by Ubisoft. It features 31 levels set during the Battle of Normandy.

The Wii version of the game uses the motion sensing abilities of the Wiimote and the Nunchuk attachment for issuing battle gestures and squad commands during gameplay. It lacks any multiplayer features.

== Reception ==
Reception

Aggregate score
Aggregator	Score
Metacritic	45/100

Review scores
Publication	Score
Eurogamer	5/10
Game Informer	5/10
GameSpot	4.5/10
GameZone	3.9/10
IGN	3/10
Nintendo Power	7/10
Official Nintendo Magazine	69%
PALGN	3/10

Brothers in Arms: Double Time received "generally unfavorable" reviews according to review aggregator platform Metacritic.
