= Brothers in Arms 2: Global Front =

2010 video game

- Developer: Gameloft Romania
- Publisher: Gameloft
- Producer: Martial Valery
- Designer: Mihai Chirila
- Programmer: Raluca Axon
- Artist: Arthur Hugot
- Writer: Patrick Downs
- Composers: Arnaud Galand; Maxime Goulet
- Series: Brothers in Arms
- Platforms: iOS, Android
- Release: iOS: WW: February 22, 2010; Android: WW: December 6, 2011
- Genres: First-person shooter, action-adventure
- Modes: Single-player, multiplayer

Brothers in Arms 2: Global Front is a 2010 World War II-era first-person shooter video game for iOS and Android, developed and published by Gameloft. It was released on the App Store on February 22, 2010. and is part of the Brothers in Arms series.

The game was re-released for iOS as a freemium app on November 22, 2011, and renamed Brothers in Arms 2: Global Front Free+. This version replaced the original version on the App Store. Global Front Free+ was released on the Android Market on December 6, 2011.

== Gameplay ==
Gameplay in Global Front. The screenshot shows the HUD; weapon selection is on the top right, below which is the grenade button. On the bottom right is the ironsight button, above which is the sprint button, and below and to the left is the fire button. On the bottom left of the screen is the duck button and the virtual joystick.

Brothers in Arms 2: Global Front shares similar gameplay to that of the Modern Combat series more so than its own predecessor, Brothers in Arms: Hour of Heroes. Whereas Hour of Heroes was a third-person shooter, Global Front is played entirely from a first-person perspective, except for when taking cover.

The game is controlled using virtual buttons on-screen; a virtual control stick is used for movement, while aiming is achieved by swiping on the touchscreen. The player can also crouch, throw grenades, use their weapon's iron sights, reload, change weapon, pick up different weapons, knife enemies, mantle obstacles, and shoot using buttons and prompts on the touchscreen. All controls can be customized from the main menu. The game originally featured an automatic cover system and a run function, but both were removed from the Free+ edition. Gyroscopic controls were also added to the Free+ edition.

Multiplayer mode is playable through both a local Wi-Fi and Bluetooth connection, and a global internet connection. During gameplay, players receive dog tags when they kill an opposing player. They can then use these dog tags to purchase reinforcements to help attack the opposing team and earn their own team points. Dog tags are also used to purchase weapons, ammo, and equipment, such as gear, grenades, and health kits, which can be carried to and from the single-player campaign.

== Plot ==
The player takes control of Corporal David Wilson for the duration of the game. Upon the outbreak of World War II, he and his brother Eric joined the U.S. Army together. David is sent to the Pacific to fight in the Solomon Islands campaign. Led by Sergeant Neissman, David's unit help take back the islands from Japanese forces and prevent the Japanese from calling in air support by destroying their radio center. As they head back to regroup with the rest of the company, David is badly wounded by a Japanese soldier, and is taken to hospital. After waking up from a six-week coma, he receives a letter, informing him both of Eric's death, and the revocation of his Medal of Honor. No further details surrounding the incident are given. Feeling something is not right, David sets out to find the truth.

Travelling to North Africa, David meets Corporal Ira Schumacher, who tells him that a soldier called Lieutenant Dyer may know something about Eric's death. David finds Dyer after taking back a town, but he claims that he didn't know Eric, having only been transferred into the platoon a month previously. He points David in the direction of MacNeil, a friend of Eric's. Schumacher helps David find MacNeil, who is critically wounded and on high doses of morphine in an old British fort in Africa. He tells David that someone named "Donnie" knows what happened, and warns him to stop investigating his brother's death if he really loves him.

Remaining in Schumacher's squad, David takes part in the invasion of Sicily, but their squad is hit by heavy enemy flak. Fighting their way through the mountains, destroying several German Anti-aircraft guns, they make it across the bridge and into the city. There, David discovers that "Donnie" is a soldier named Donnovan. The only information Donnovan is able to provide is that Eric was murdered. Confused, David joins the Allied Forces push from Normandy to Germany, where a man named Hartley tells him that Colonel Becker knows about Eric's death, and is not afraid to talk about it. David finds an angry Becker, who tells David that Eric was killed during an ambush by Germans after stealing supplies from a hospital. However, David does not believe him, and soon learns that Donnovan and Dyer were with Eric during the ambush. David confronts Donnovan, who admits that he should have been with Eric, but instead remained at the hospital because of a nurse he was attracted to. David realizes that Dyer lied to him, and is hiding a secret.

Learning that Dyer has gone back to the Pacific, David returns there, determined to find Dyer, reuniting with Neissman and his unit. After taking a Japanese camp, they join with Dyer's unit. Dyer suddenly leaves the group, and is followed by David. Dyer is found to be tracking a Japanese patrol, and as he and David fight the patrol, Dyer reveals the truth: he was stealing medical supplies from the hospital and selling them. When the German ambushed the unit, Dyer escaped, and seeing that Eric was dead, he made it look as if Eric was in possession of the stolen items, but was sorry about what happened.

At the end of the game, a Japanese soldier tries to kill Dyer from behind and the player is given the choice of whether or not to save him. In the free version of the game, if David does choose to save him, Dyer escapes unharmed, but if David chooses not to save him, Dyer is shot, although he is then saved by Neissman, who is searching for them. Either way, the game ends with Dyer surviving, Eric's name being cleared and his Medal of Honor restored. Although, in the original paid version of the game, if the player chooses not to save Dyer, he will die and Eric's name is tarnished, not recovering his Medal of Honor.

== Reception ==
Brothers in Arms 2: Global Front
(iOS version)

Aggregate scores
Aggregator	Score
GameRankings	81.40%
Metacritic	83/100

Review scores
Publication	Score
IGN	7.7/10
Slide to Play	4/4
Pocket Gamer	7/10
TouchArcade	4/5
TouchGen	4/5

Global Front was released to mainly positive reviews. The original iOS version holds aggregates scores of 81.40% on GameRankings, based on five reviews, and 83 out of 100 on Metacritic, also based on five reviews.

Pocket Gamer's Tracy Erickson scored the game 7 out of 10, giving it a "Bronze Award". He was critical of the controls, arguing that there are far too many onscreen buttons, and also felt that some of the levels were poorly designed. Ultimately, he felt that "Brothers in Arms 2 opts for variety over freshness and largely succeeds in spite of its many minor shortcomings".

IGN's Levi Buchanan scored it 7.7 out of 10. He was critical of the rigid linearity of the gameplay, the control scheme and the "completely impractical" storyline, but he praised the graphics and concluded that "Brothers in Arms 2: Global Front is a big improvement over the original Brothers for iPhone, but if you want a shooter for your iPhone, I have to push N.O.V.A. to the top of the pack. It's just a better game. If Global Front wasn't such a hand-holder and let you actually strike out on your own a little (and if Gameloft throttled back on all of the on-screen buttons), it would be a much better play. Still, with its great set pieces, Global Front remains better than most shooters on the App Store".

TouchArcade's Blake Patterson scored the game 4 out of 5, saying it improved on its predecessor in every way, and calling it "a highly enjoyable, action-packed shooter that offers some of the most intense battle sequences you'll find on the iPhone, making this latest from Gameloft a gaming experience that's rather hard to pass up".

TouchGen's Nigel Wood also scored it 4 out of 5, praising the graphics and customisable controls, but criticizing the linearity of the game, the "non-existent" AI, the storyline and the voice acting. Ultimately, he felt that multiplayer mode saved the game: "What saves this game from becoming a bust though is the great addition of multiplayer. It's one of the most fully featured yet, with up to eight players, varied and detailed arenas, a great array of weapons and more importantly, the addition of domination/capture the flag over the usual deathmatch and team deathmatch".

Slide to Play's Chris Reed scored it 4 out of 4. He too was critical of the AI and voice acting, but praised the controls and graphics, saying that "we can still unequivocally recommend this game to anyone looking for a full handheld gaming experience. Brothers in Arms 2 is right up there with top-tier DS and PSP games, and should not be missed".
