= Jesse Divnich =

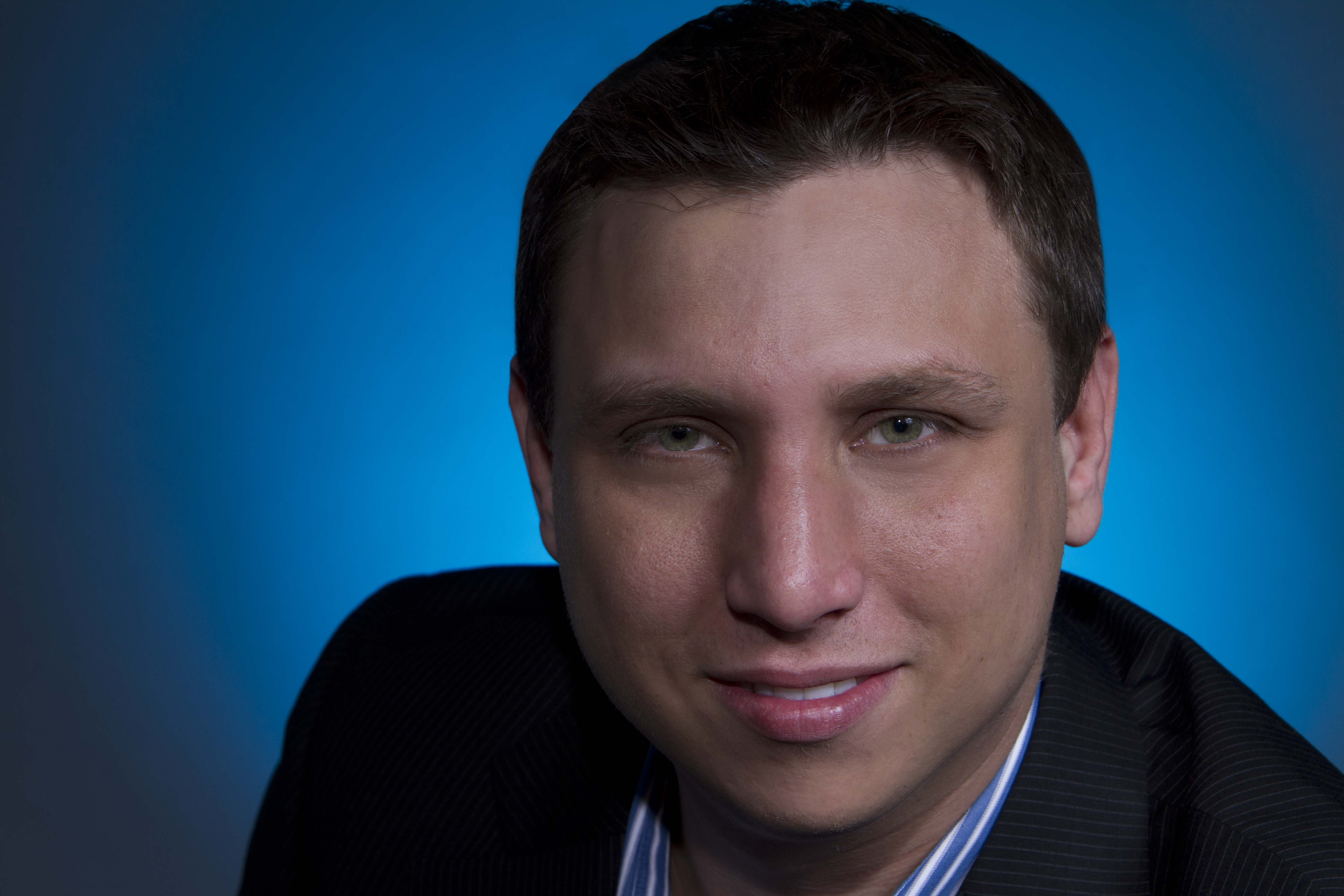
- Born: Lasalle, Ontario
- Education: B.A. Management
- Occupation: President
- Employer: Good Entertainment Group
- Known for: Market Analysis

Jesse Divnich is the current President of the Good Entertainment Group and Good Gamer Group. He is also the former Vice President of Product Strategy & Insights at Tilting Point as well as the former Vice President of Insights and Analysis for Electronic Entertainment Design and Research (EEDAR).

== Background ==
Divnich was born in LaSalle, Ontario, but currently resides in Carlsbad, California. Divnich graduated from Eastern Michigan University with a Bachelor of Arts in business management and started in the financial sector with the Gerson Lehrman Group. After that, he then became a consultant for private investors. On the back of his success with the financial sector of the video game industry, Divnich earned the recognition of several journalists from both the gaming and financial media industry. Divnich is most known for his appearances on G4TV, Forbes, The Street, Reuters, Market Watch, GameSpot, GameDaily, and his own "Divnich Tapes" on Gamasutra. As of 2009, Divnich publishes regularly through his own articles on IndustryGamer.com called the "Divnich Debriefs". Some of his known favorite video games are the Call of Duty franchise and the Quake franchise.

== Career ==
In July 2007 Divnich helped found the site The simExchange with peer Brain Shiau. He was the Director of Business Development; this is what Shiau had to say: "Jesse Divnich will be providing analysis of the video game industry on the simExchange. He has assumed many professional roles including; beta tester, programmer, publisher analyst." For the last 6 years, Divnich has served as a private consultant and analyst for buy-side investment firms. Divnich has received many awards for his work in the private investment sector as an analyst covering publicly traded video game companies.

After he published several research based articles at the simExchange, on April 16, 2008, Divnich was appointed the Director of Analyst Services at EEDAR. With EEDAR Divnich has continued to produce accurate predictions and represent the company in a positive way with a strong presence at industry events. He helps investors make more informed decisions using EEDAR's proprietary database and his own experience by delivering products under the "Analyst Services Division". President and Chief operating officer of EEDAR Geoffrey Zatkin had this to say about the addition of Divnich to the firm: "We are delighted to have Mr. Divnich join the EEDAR team. Jesse's deep roots in the community, in-depth knowledge of the financial sector and strong industry relationships will assist EEDAR in achieving our goal – that of improving the efficiency of the videogame industry by enabling informed decision making,"

Divnich is best known for a speech he gave at the Montreal International Game Summit in 2009 where he declared that marketing and brand awareness were more important to a games financial success than its actual quality. In a follow-up interview with GamesIndustry.biz, he says "I'm not here to instill false hope into developers, they need to know the truth. We are bombarded with over 1000 new games every year and while having a high quality product certainly helps in contributing to a game’s commercial success, it is far from the only factor."

In December 2009, he came to Reggie Fils-Aimé, Nintendo Of America President's defense, on the claim that New Super Mario Bros. Wii would be a worldwide success, even though it would not outsell the top-selling title at the time, Call of Duty: Modern Warfare 2. In an interview with 1Up he said, ""The odds certainly look bleak that the New Super Mario Bros. will outpace the Xbox 360 version of Call of Duty: Modern Warfare 2 by the end of January...But in Reggie's defense, Call of Duty pushed over 4 million units on one platform in three weeks. That is just ridiculous...4 million in one month wasn't even considered achievable number by any video game, ever."

After Steve Jobs' announcement of the iPad, Divnich spoke out against its ability to be a "primary gaming device" in an MSNBC interview. He continued in another interview and said "If third-party publishers are going to treat the iPad as a serious gaming device, the average selling price per game has to at least double, which is difficult to achieve, especially when you consider that your $19.99 game in the App Store is competing against games that sell for $1 to $5."

On July 6, 2010, Divnich and Electronic Entertainment Design and Research released a behavioral study showing the influence professional game critics can have on consumers' willingness to purchase and willingness to recommend video games. The study was formally released on G4 TV's Attack of the Show with Adam Sessler. Vice President of Public Relation for PopCap said, "We've always known that good reviews are beneficial to a game's sales, but we didn't realize just how significant a role they play in the purchasing decision process."
