= Chips (coffee shop) =

Historic coffee shop in Los Angeles, California, United States

Coordinates: 33.9253°N 118.3522°W

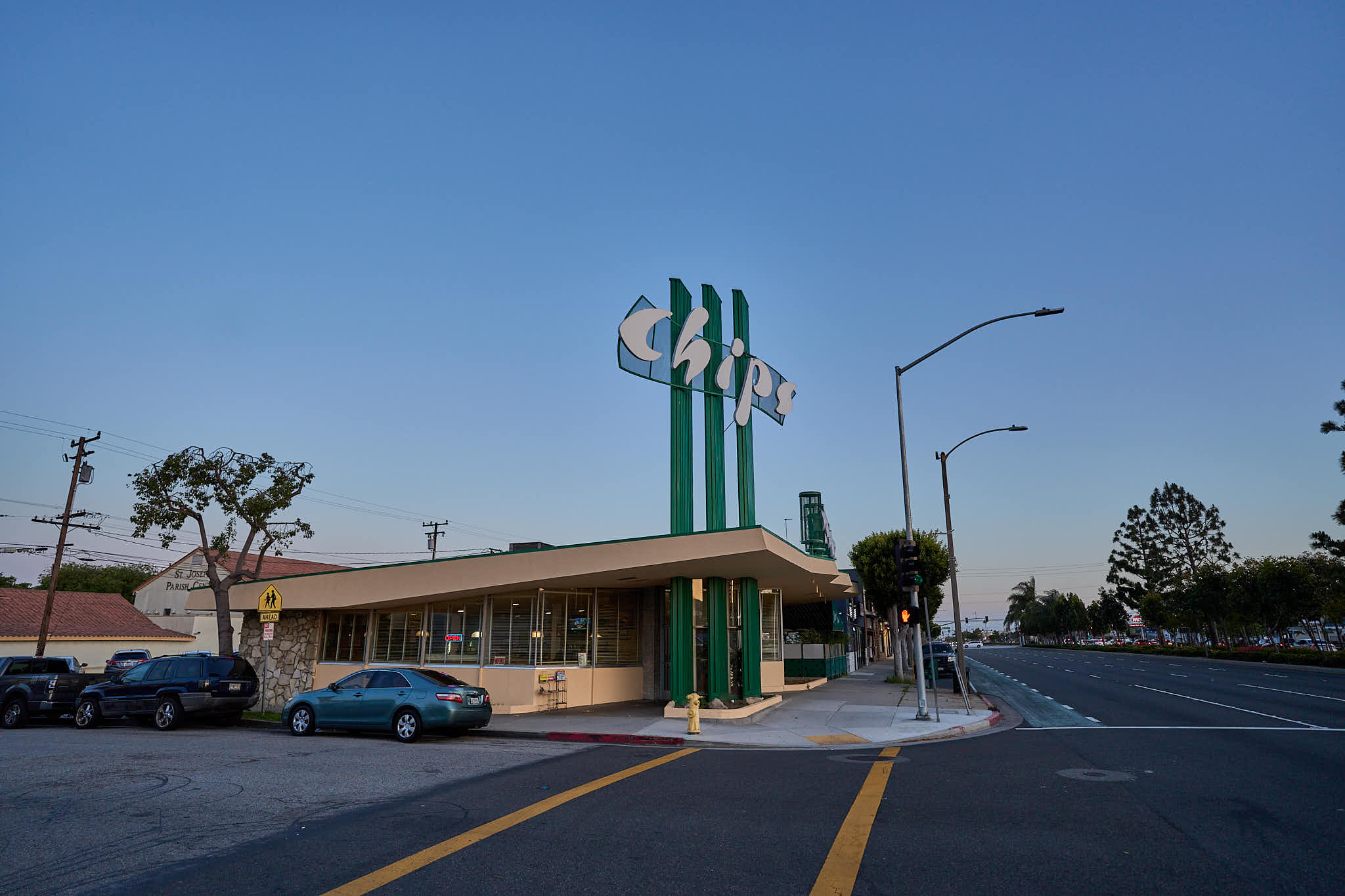
- Interactive map of Chips

Restaurant information
- Location: 11908 Hawthorne Blvd, Hawthorne, Los Angeles, California, 90250, U.S.

Chips is a historic coffee shop in Los Angeles, California. It is an example of the Googie Architecture style of Modern Architecture. It was designed by Harry Harrison. It features a jutting roof, large glass windows, tropical plants and a steel-beam pylon sign and is located at 11908 Hawthorne Boulevard (California).
