= The simExchange =

Web-based prediction market

- Website type: Video Game Prediction market
- Owners: The simExchange, LLC
- Creator: Brian Shiau
- Website: www.thesimexchange.com
- Registration: Optional
- Launched: August 29, 2006
- Current status: Online

The simExchange is a web-based prediction market in which players use virtual money to buy and sell stocks and futures contracts in upcoming video game properties. The main purpose of the web site is to predict trends in the video game industry, particularly how upcoming products will sell and how they will be received by the critics. For those who do not participate in the prediction market, the web site is a database of sales forecasts and game quality forecasts that are updated in real-time. The web site also features a number of "Wisdom of the crowd"-type content collaboration and aggregation tools, including means for sharing information, articles, images, and videos about the games.

== How it works ==
The prediction market works as a stock market game for players to predict the number of units a game or console hardware will sell or the reviews a game will receive. These predictions are made by trading global lifetime sales stocks, NPD Futures, and Metacritic Futures. These tradable contracts directly forecast the metric, for example: If a stock is priced at 100DKP, this corresponds to a forecast of 1 million units. If a trader believes the product will sell more than 1 million units, then he would buy the stock, if he believes the product will sell less than 1 million units, then he would sell the stock. In this way, the simExchange is a type of stock market game.

The website also features a number of user tools to aggregate and display information about video games and publishers. In addition to a message board for each game, the simExchange advertises the ability of users to submit relevant news articles, and to append images and videos of a game to its page. Users may also vote on the importance of such submitted content by spending 100DKP to place either an "up bid" or a "down bid" on the content, receiving a 100DKP payout every time another user votes in the same way. Down bids were removed from the system in August 2009 as a result of user feedback. In this way, the simExchange is also a social news website. In March 2010, a number of these content submission tools, such as the ability to submit images and video, were removed due to lack of use, although the features remain advertised in the site's tutorials.

=== DKP ===
DKP is the name of the virtual currency used on the simExchange. The currency was named after the dragon kill points used in many massively multiplayer online games. Unlike some forms of virtual currency, DKP is not backed by real money.

== Types of contracts ==
The simExchange aims to predict both the quantitative and qualitative sides of the video game industry. It originally launched with only stocks that forecast the global lifetime sales of gaming products. On April 12, 2007, the simExchange began public testing of monthly sales futures contracts, which later became known as NPD Futures. Metacritic Futures were similarly introduced in September of the same year. As of September 2010, the simExchange has deactivated both futures contracts, again only offers trading in stocks.

=== Stocks ===
A stock on the simExchange, also referred to as a Global Lifetime Sales stock or simply a GLS stock, represents the total global unit sales a video game product will sell through to consumers over the product's lifetime. These stocks do not have a pre-determined expiration date as some games can sell for years.

For global lifetime stocks, 1DKP equals 10,000 copies of that game sold. For example, if a trader thinks a game will sell 234,000 copies, that would correlate to a stock price of 23.40DKP.

=== NPD Futures ===
An NPD Futures Contract was a virtual contract that predicted the sales data the NPD Group released on a monthly basis. These futures covered the NPD Group's data on console hardware sales, game sales, and total software sales. These contracts would cease trading one day before NPD reports were made public, and pay out at the end of the following day.

The price of NPD Futures Contracts was similar to those of stocks, with 1DKP price corresponding to 10,000 units sold. For example, if the Xbox 360 November Futures Contract is priced at 60.00 DKP, this corresponds to a forecast of 600,000 units will be sold in the retail month of November.

The simExchange stopped offering NPD Futures Contracts after September 2010, although the archives of all forecasts up until this point are still available on the simExchange website. The discontinuation of this service corresponded with the NPD Group's decision to cease publicly releasing hardware and software unit sales numbers.

=== Metacritic Futures ===
A Metacritic Futures Contract is a virtual contract that predicts the score a game will receive from review aggregation website Metacritic. Despite not being directly based on sales data, Metacritic scores have been shown to be highly indicative of a game's sales. These contracts cease trading and pay out 14 days after the game's release.

A Metacritic Future's price is directly related to the Metacritic score. For example, a 90.00 DKP price would correspond to a forecast of a 90 score on Metacritic.

The simExchange stopped offering Metacritic Futures after July 2009 due to lack of user interest in trading the contracts.

== Applications ==
Data produced by the simExchange has been noted as a resource for real-world investors. The metrics that are forecast are fundamental factors that drive the stocks of the companies that produce the games. The simExchange's prediction market data has been used by Wall Street analysts, such as Michael Pachter, in their published notes and financial news outlets, such as Reuters, MarketWatch, and TheStreet.com. Given the current status of the website, it is unlikely that the simExchange's data is still influential or relevant.

== Current status ==
Users of the simExchange noticed a "sharp decline" in the number of users in 2010, after NPD Futures were no longer offered as part of the game, and site upkeep slowed to a crawl by mid-2011. Although the game still has players, users have described it as everything from "dead" to "a ghost town."

== See also ==
- Hollywood Stock Exchange
