= Hollywood Stock Exchange =

Web-based multiplayer video game

The Hollywood Stock Exchange, or HSX, is a web-based, multiplayer game in which players use simulated money to buy and sell "shares" of actors, directors, upcoming films, and film-related options. The game uses Virtual Specialist technology invented by HSX co-founders and creators Max Keiser and Michael R. Burns, who were awarded a U.S. patent no. 5950176 in 1999 for the invention. Claims of this patent cover trading applications for trading virtual securities using virtual currencies over a network.

The company moved into the former Ritts Furniture building designed by Harry Harrison on Santa Monica Boulevard.

== Operation ==
Because trading directly affects the prices of the securities – purchasing enough shares of a stock causes its price to rise, and selling causes its price to fall – and because the ultimate value of a moviestock is based on the film's box office, stock prices act as box office predictions. For example, if a particular moviestock trades at "H$40.00", the market is predicting that the movie will gross US$40 million at the box office in the first four weekends of wide release. In 2007, players in the Hollywood Stock Exchange correctly predicted 32 of the 39 major-category Oscar nominees and seven out of eight top-category winners. The Hollywood Stock Exchange is considered a good example of a prediction market. Previous incarnations of the game included a music market (for purchasing musical artists), prizes for top gainers and, briefly, a "buyout" program in which HSX would reward top players by purchasing their portfolios at a price of US$1.00 per HS1 million if the player listed the portfolio for sale on eBay. These features have been discontinued. The practice of selling portfolios on eBay was inaugurated by Curtis Edmonds, a former Texan lawyer.

HSX attracted some private investment during the dot-com boom and ran TV ads on cable channels in an effort to attract players. After the dot-com crash, HSX was eventually acquired by units of Cantor Fitzgerald. Cantor has used HSX's moviestock prices to assist Cantor's gambling operations in the United Kingdom, in which bettors can place bets on how much money US films will gross. HSX is headquartered in Century City, Los Angeles, California.

== Special warrants ==
During the holidays, there were "holiday warrants" that allowed one to predict the final gross of a movie by President's Day weekend of the following year. For example, there was a Narnia warrant of H$180 million. Since Narnia would make over US$300 million by February 20, 2006, anyone who purchased the warrant made over H$120 per share. On the other hand, Zathura had a holiday warrant for H$70 million. Since Zathura closed a month after its release and made less than U$30 million, anyone who predicted that it would make more than US$70 million lost their investment. During the summer, there were similar "Blockbuster Warrants" that allowed one to predict the final gross of a movie by Labor Day weekend of that year. Currently, Blockbuster Warrants are issued throughout the year for those movies that will gross $100 Million or more through their first 12 weekends of release.

Every winter there are special warrants to predict the Oscar nominees called "Nominoptions" followed by Award Options to predict the actual Academy Award winners.

There are special warrants for first year scripted TV shows based upon the number of episodes that will be shown by May 31, the end of the TV Season.

HSX also releases various special derivatives throughout the year. During the summer of 2006, there were derivatives for the FIFA World Cup. Other past special warrants involved the contestants on Survivor, American Idol and top categories of the Grammy Awards.

== See also ==
- Cantor Exchange
- The simExchange
