= Brothers in Arms (video game series) =

- Genre: Tactical shooter
- Developer: Gearbox Software
- Publishers: Ubisoft, Gameloft
- Platforms: Xbox, Microsoft Windows, PlayStation 2, PlayStation Portable, Nintendo DS, N-Gage, PlayStation 3, Xbox 360, Wii, OS X, iOS, Android, Windows Phone
- First release: Brothers in Arms: Road to Hill 30; 2005
- Latest release: Brothers in Arms 3: Sons of War; December 17, 2014

Brothers in Arms is a tactical shooter video game series by Gearbox Software, consisting of ten individual games. The core series consists of the first-person shooters Brothers in Arms: Road to Hill 30 (2005), Brothers in Arms: Earned in Blood (2005), and Brothers in Arms: Hell's Highway (2008). The storyline is set against the backdrop of the liberation of Western Europe during World War II. It has mainly been released for Windows and MacOS platforms as well as sixth and seventh generation consoles and some mobile devices.

== Games ==
Aggregate review scores
Game	Metacritic
Brothers in Arms: Road to Hill 30	(PC) 87/100 (PS2) 82/100 (Xbox) 88/100
Brothers in Arms: Earned in Blood	(PC) 84/100 (PS2) 71/100 (Xbox) 85/100
Brothers in Arms: D-Day	(PSP) 65/100
Brothers in Arms DS	(NDS) 72/100
Brothers in Arms: Hell's Highway	(PC) 79/100 (PS3) 76/100 (X360) 76/100
Brothers in Arms: Double Time	(Wii) 45/100
Brothers in Arms: Hour of Heroes	(iOS) 69% (Note: GameRankings score)
Brothers in Arms 2: Global Front	(iOS) 83/100
Brothers in Arms 3: Sons of War	(iOS) 60/100

=== Brothers in Arms: Road to Hill 30 (2005) ===
Developed using Unreal Engine 2, Road to Hill 30 was Gearbox's first game after a series of expansions and ports to other games, such as Half-Life. It received highly positive reviews from critics.

=== Brothers in Arms: Earned in Blood (2005) ===
The second installment in the series, released about seven months after Road to Hill 30. Like the first game, Earned in Blood earned positive reviews, while the PlayStation 2 version received average to positive reviews.

=== Brothers in Arms: D-Day (2006) ===
First-person shooter game for the PlayStation Portable.

=== Brothers in Arms DS (2007) ===
Brothers in Arms DS is a third-person shooter video game developed by Gearbox Software and published by Ubisoft for the Nintendo DS.

=== Brothers in Arms: Hell's Highway (2008) ===
The third installment in the series was made using Unreal Engine 3, developed for PC, Xbox 360 and PlayStation 3. It also earned positive reviews.

=== Brothers in Arms: Art of War (2008) ===
Art of War is mainly a top-down shooter, featuring 13 missions in three campaigns, including Operation Market Garden.

=== Brothers in Arms (2008) ===
Brothers in Arms is a game developed and published by Gameloft for the N-Gage mobile gaming service, and is a port of Brothers in Arms DS. The game is a full 3D third-person shooter.

=== Brothers in Arms: Double Time (2008) ===
Brothers in Arms: Double Time is a compilation for the Wii and OS X platforms. The title is a compilation of the first two Brothers in Arms games, Road to Hill 30 and Earned in Blood and was developed by Gearbox Software and published by Ubisoft. It has 31 levels set during the Battle of Normandy.

=== Brothers in Arms: Hour of Heroes (2008) ===
Hour of Heroes was the series' first game released for iOS mobile devices. It was published by Gameloft.

=== Brothers in Arms 2: Global Front (2010) ===
Brothers in Arms 2: Global Front is a first-person shooter released for iOS and Android, with the game's events occurring in World War II.

=== Brothers in Arms 3: Sons of War (2014) ===
Brothers in Arms 3: Sons of War is a third-person shooter created for iOS, Android and Windows Phone.

=== Furious 4 (cancelled) ===
Originally intended to become the part of the series, it became a separate intellectual property after negative fan feedback. It was canceled in July 2015 and many elements were pushed into Gearbox's Battleborn.

=== Brothers in Arms: Win the War Pinball (2023) ===
A virtual pinball adaptation based on the Brothers in Arms series was developed by Zen Studios. It is one of three pinball tables based on games developed by Gearbox Studios, released in Pinball FX on February 16, 2023 PlayStation 4, PlayStation 5, Xbox One and Xbox Series X/S, and on Steam and Switch shortly after.

=== Untitled Brothers in Arms game (TBD) ===
Gearbox's CEO Randy Pitchford affirmed that the company is working on a new Brothers in Arms game in September 2021, but as per company policy, they will not show any details of it until they are much closer to completion.

== Television series ==
Gearbox announced in April 2020 that the Brothers in Arms series was being developed into a television program. Scott Rosenbaum is set to be the showrunner, with Gearbox's Randy Pitchford, Ubisoft Pictures CEO Jean-Julien Baronnet, Richard Whelan and Sean Haran as producers. The first season is planned to be developed around Exercise Tiger, a disastrous training exercise during WWII.
