= Brothers in Arms: Earned in Blood =

2005 video game

- Developer: Gearbox Software
- Publisher: Ubisoft
- Director: Brian Martel
- Producer: Mike Wardwell
- Programmer: Patrick Deupree
- Artist: Matthew Vandolen
- Writer: Mike Neumann
- Composer: David McGarry
- Series: Brothers in Arms
- Engine: Unreal Engine 2
- Platforms: Windows; Xbox; PlayStation 2; Wii
- Release: Windows, Xbox: NA/AU: October 6, 2005; EU: October 7, 2005; PlayStation 2: NA: October 18, 2005; AU: October 27, 2005; EU: October 28, 2005
- Genres: First-person shooter, tactical shooter
- Modes: Single-player, multiplayer

Brothers in Arms: Earned in Blood is a tactical first-person shooter video game developed by Gearbox Software and published by Ubisoft for Microsoft Windows, Xbox and PlayStation 2 in 2005. It was ported to the Wii in 2008 as a part of the Brothers in Arms: Double Time compilation.

Earned in Blood continues the Brothers in Arms saga as newly promoted Sergeant Joe "Red" Hartsock (Hartsock was the Corporal of Baker's Fire Team), who was part of the historic Normandy invasion in the previous game. Earned in Blood includes several new multiplayer missions, weapons, and vehicles, plus a new co-op skirmish mode which was added as a patch for the PC version and downloadable from Xbox Live for the Xbox version of the game. The AI of enemies has also been improved considerably in this game, while level designs are more open-ended than the original.

== Plot ==
The story is told as a "reflection" on the events that took place earlier, as Army historian Colonel S.L.A. Marshall is interviewing paratroopers 15+ days after D-Day. The story is divided into three parts. The first part of the game is a recollection of Hartsock's time in Sergeant Matt Baker's squad during the initial D-Day invasion. The second part picks up when he takes command of 2nd Squad, 3rd Platoon during the liberation and defense of Carentan, and the eventual link-up between 82nd and 101st Airborne Division at the town of Baupte. The final part will take place in and around Saint-Sauveur-le-Vicomte. Although the first part takes place under Baker's command, every mission is one not included in Road to Hill 30. The player commands Desola, Allen, and Garnett from 3rd Squad, and some soldiers from 2nd Squad at first. Then the game switches the player to command the entire 2nd Squad after the Battle of Bloody Gulch (Hill 30).

Hartsock's squad consists of the remains of the original 2nd Squad (Cpl. Franklin Paddock, Pvt. Dean "Friar" Winchell, and Pfc. James Marsh) and the remnants of 1st Squad (Cpl. Jacob Campbell, Pvt. Will Paige, and Pvt. Derrick McConnell). In addition, the player will also be in command of Corporal (later promoted to Sergeant) Seamus Doyle of the 82nd Airborne during the initial D-Day invasion in early parts of the game.

== Gameplay ==
The gameplay in Earned in Blood is similar to Brothers in Arms: Road to Hill 30. The player usually assumes command of two teams of paratroopers to use the Four Fs - Find, Fix, Flank, and Finish—tactic against the enemy. The game discourages the use of solo run 'n' gun tactics by limiting the player's ability to aim, by decreasing the player's health, and by placing large numbers of enemies behind cover. To successfully complete a mission, the player has to study the layout of the battlefield, fix/suppress the enemy with overwhelming suppressive fire with one team (usually the fire team), and direct another team (usually the assault team) to flank the enemy by sneaking to the side or rear of the enemy to finish them off.

In Earned in Blood, the enemy constantly repositions according to the player's action, regardless of danger. This change makes stealth and distraction important considerations when the player is attempting to flank the enemy. At the same time, tactics such as forcing the enemy into kill zones is possible. The enemy AI allows the player to be attacked more frequently.

Brothers in Arms: Earned in Blood supports online multiplayer. The Xbox version had online multiplayer through Xbox Live which was shut down on April 15, 2010. Brothers in Arms: Earned in Blood is now playable online using replacement online servers for the Xbox called Insignia.

== Development ==
The games uses the same graphics engine as Brothers in Arms: Road to Hill 30, which is based on the Unreal Engine 2.

== Reception ==
Reception

Aggregate score
Aggregator	Score		
Aggregator	PC	PS2	Xbox
Metacritic	84/100	71/100	85/100

Review scores
Publication	Score		
Publication	PC	PS2	Xbox
Edge	8/10	N/A	8/10
Electronic Gaming Monthly	N/A	8.33/10	8.33/10
Eurogamer	8/10	N/A	N/A
Game Informer	N/A	N/A	8/10
GamePro	N/A	3.5/5	N/A
GameRevolution	B+	N/A	B+
GameSpot	8.7/10	6.8/10	8.7/10
GameSpy	4/5	3/5	5/5
GameTrailers	8.9/10	8.9/10	8.9/10
GameZone	N/A	N/A	8.9/10
IGN	8.8/10	5/10	8.2/10
Official U.S. PlayStation Magazine	N/A	4/5	N/A
Official Xbox Magazine (US)	N/A	N/A	9.6/10
PC Gamer (US)	87%	N/A	N/A
The Sydney Morning Herald	3.5/5	3.5/5	3.5/5
The Times	4/5	4/5	4/5

Brothers in Arms: Earned in Blood received "generally favorable" for PC and Xbox, and "mixed or average" for PS2 reviews, according to review aggregator platform Metacritic.

During the 9th Annual Interactive Achievement Awards, Earned in Blood received a nomination for "Outstanding Achievement in Story and Character Development".
