= Brothers in Arms: Road to Hill 30 =

2005 video game

- Developer: Gearbox Software
- Publisher: Ubisoft
- Directors: Randy Pitchford; Brian Martel
- Designers: Randy Pitchford; Brian Martel
- Programmers: Patrick Deupree; Steve Jones
- Artists: Brian Martel; Jeramy Cooke
- Writers: Mike Neumann; John Antal
- Composer: Stephen Harwood
- Series: Brothers in Arms
- Engine: Unreal Engine 2
- Platforms: Xbox; Microsoft Windows; PlayStation 2; Wii
- Release: Xbox: NA: March 1, 2005; EU: March 18, 2005; Microsoft Windows: NA: March 8, 2005; EU: March 18, 2005; PlayStation 2: NA: March 15, 2005; EU: March 18, 2005
- Genres: First-person shooter, tactical shooter
- Modes: Single-player, multiplayer

Brothers in Arms: Road to Hill 30 is a tactical first-person shooter video game developed by Gearbox Software and published by Ubisoft for Xbox, Microsoft Windows and PlayStation 2 in 2005. It is the first game in the Brothers in Arms series and takes place during World War II. It was ported to the Wii in 2008 as part of the Brothers in Arms: Double Time compilation.

Brothers in Arms: Road to Hill 30 received positive reviews from critics and was a commercial success. The game was used to recreate scenarios in a 2005 History Channel special, titled Brothers in Arms.

== Gameplay ==
In most levels of Brothers in Arms, the player is given command of one or two separate 1–3 man teams, with the exception of several sections in which the player is not in command of any unit. There are two types of teams, which are automatically provided before each mission:

- Fire team: Made up of soldiers with the M1 Garand and the Browning Automatic Rifle and used to fix the enemy with suppressive fire.
- Assault team: Made up of soldiers usually with the M1A1 Carbine and the Thompson submachine gun and is good for flanking the enemy while they are pinned down by the player's fire team.

Additionally, some levels provide the player with a tank in lieu of a squad, providing players with heavy firepower and mobile cover. The player can man the pintle-mounted M1919 Browning machine gun on the tank for additional suppression.

Brothers in Arms is notable for its intuitive command system; teams and tanks can be ordered to move, lay suppressive fire, rally, find cover, and charge the enemy. The game stresses at multiple points the effectiveness of fire and maneuver tactics, known as the Four Fs actually used by the military during World War II, expressed in the game tutorial as "Find, Fix, Flank, Finish" describing the steps in suppressing and flanking an enemy.

The focus on team command rather than individual marksmanship is emphasized by providing the player with inaccurate aim. Brothers in Arms models weapons with erratic accuracy, and enemy fire can interfere with a player's aim to simulate the effects of suppressive fire. The relative lack of accuracy is designed to simulate the difficulty in hitting targets in a combat situation and to force the player to use team members to engage enemy units and provide better tactical opportunities.

The Xbox version had online multiplayer through Xbox Live which was shut down on April 15, 2010. Brothers in Arms is now playable online using replacement online servers for the Xbox called Insignia.

== Plot ==
On June 6, 1944, Sergeant Matt Baker participates in the initial jump off, taking place hours before the Normandy landings. When their plane is hit by anti-aircraft fire, killing Private David Muzza, Baker is thrown from the plane and separated from his squad. After landing, Baker eventually manages to regroup with Staff Sergeant "Mac" Hassey, radioman Private First Class Kevin Leggett and Lieutenant Colonel Cole. Though off course, Mac leads Baker and Leggett in destroying several Flak 38 anti-aircraft guns with explosives. By morning, more of the squad has managed to find one another, including Corporal Joseph "Red" Hartsock, who Mac delegates to Baker to clear an important road leading to Utah Beach. After fighting their way through the German lines, Baker and Hartsock link up with squadmates Privates Larry Allen and Micheal Garnett, and the four paratroopers defend against a counterattack from the beach and succeed in securing an exit for the 4th Infantry Division.

With the beachhead secure, Baker, Hartsock, Allen, and Garnett are tasked to clear out "Objective XYZ", a makeshift German barracks housing scores of Germans.

After securing a landing field for glider infantry reinforcements, the 502nd is then tasked with clearing the town of Vierville on D-Day+1, with assistance from an M5 Stuart light tank whose commander happens to be Baker's best friend, Sergeant George Risner. Baker's squad and Risner manage to clear the town, as well as repel an armored counterattack before embarking on the tank to secure a vital crossroad near Saint-Côme-du-Mont. Although successful in breaking through the heavy German defenses, Risner's tank is ambushed and immobilized by a Panzerfaust. Risner dies as he provides cover for Baker and his squad, becoming the titular dead man in Dead Mans Corner.

On D-Day+2, Baker and the regrouped 502nd assault Saint-Côme-du-Mont. Mac instructs Baker to first clear out a German machine gun nest which has been making transit in the area risky for the troops. Baker and his squad, now with Corporal Sam Corrion and Private Michael Desola, succeed in doing so and are then tasked with retaking the town from the occupying Fallschirmjäger forces. The next day, Baker learns from Leggett that Allen and Garnett died after securing a barn. Baker's team then fights through the stragglers from Vierville to destroy a bridge that could be used to transport German armor towards the beaches. With an M4 Sherman tank in support, Baker manages to fight his way through enemy lines and destroy the bridge.

On D-Day+4, Baker finds more of his squad, Privates First Class Tom "Zano" Zanovitch, Stephen "Obi" Obrieski, and Privates Johnny Rivas and Dale McCreary, but Rivas is killed before they can move out. After that, they link up with Cole to secure a causeway leading to Carentan, a crossroad town linking Utah and Omaha beaches. Stuka bombers, however, attack the causeway, knocking Baker unconscious for a day and killing Desola. Once Baker recovers the next day, he finds out about Desola, and that his final squadmate, Private First Class Jack Courtland has shown up. Lt. Col. Cole then leads an attack on a heavily defended German farmhouse, using smoke barrages to conceal themselves from the numerous machine gun emplacements. After taking the farmhouse, the 502nd then repels a German counterattack, while also rescuing a Lt. Homer Combs.

The following day, Baker and the 502nd push into Carentan, destroying German armor and making steady progress. The town is liberated, but Baker's squad loses Obrieski and barely holds the town when the Germans attempt to retake it with tank support. After this, the 101st Airborne Division moves slightly out of Carentan before being struck by a massive German counterattack. Baker's men fight their way through German armor and infantry as they make their way to the main defensive positions. Upon arriving, however, Baker is quickly knocked unconscious in the fierce action, and witnesses Leggett's death; when he awakes, Mac sends him off the line alone to find nearby American armored reinforcements from the 2nd Armored Division. Baker successfully finds two tanks and helps drive off the German attackers, saving the remaining paratroopers.

The exhausted paratroopers are sent back to Carentan, where Mac congratulates them for their efforts. Mac announces Hartsock's promotion to Sergeant, appointing him in command of another squad, and that a "Colonel Marshall" is waiting to interview them on their experiences. Mac, however, then privately tells Baker that "this isn't over" and welcomes him to "the end of the beginning" as Carentan suddenly comes under bombardment, and the squad charges once again into action.

== Development ==
Brothers in Arms uses a modified version of Unreal Engine 2 with various effects such as motion blur, colored and lighting, anisotropic filtering, rag-doll physics, realistic ballistics, surround sound and dampening. The story behind Brothers in Arms was based on the missions that were conducted by the 502nd Parachute Infantry Regiment, of the famed 101st Airborne Division, behind enemy lines during D-Day. Randy Pitchford, the developer of the game, described it as "the best game [he's] ever worked on". He and his development team tried to recreate the actual look of 1944 Normandy and its buildings, landmarks, streets and battlefields. They researched about the real soldiers who fought there, the historical reconnaissance photographs, and operations and battles such as Operation XYZ, Utah Beach and Purple Heart Lane. Their research included interviewing various veterans and shooting the actual weapons from the game's timeline.

Retired Colonel of the US Army John Antal was the consultant of the development team in creating the game's innovative tactical gameplay. He was tasked in making sure that the action and the commands were accurate and authentic as possible, and he taught the development team both in the classroom and the field about real-combat decision making and firefights. The development team researched and analyzed other tactical and strategy shooters in order to create their own unique gameplay in Brothers in Arms. They designed the characters to behave like real trained soldiers that were fully capable of engaging the enemy, covering each other, and getting good firing positions to engage from. Pitchford described the development of the game as "expensive and time consuming", and the process in making the game took several prototypes and attempts that cost them time, resources and ideas. These attempts were made in order to make the tactical combat as fun and engaging as possible, without making it look like other standard shooters in the market. Pitchford had a problem in making the story due to the fact that World War II shooters were as "scripted as a Disneyland ride and not as interactive" in the current video game industry. The development team made sure that the story was not as clichéd and scripted as other World War II stories, and make the game as dynamic and plausible with players actually caring for their character's lives and the combat they're into. The game was released on March 15, 2005, for Xbox, PS2 and PC. Ubisoft Shanghai assisted in porting and releasing the game for the PS2. Brothers in Arms: Road to Hill 30 was Gearbox Software's first independently owned game, and Pitchford made sure to protect its license from other publishers who want to buy it. Pitchford gave credit to Ubisoft in taking the risk, giving them freedom to develop the game as their own and helping them in its marketing.

== Reception ==
Reception

Aggregate score
Aggregator	Score		
Aggregator	PC	PS2	Xbox
Metacritic	87/100	82/100	88/100

Review scores
Publication	Score		
Publication	PC	PS2	Xbox
Electronic Gaming Monthly	8.83/10	N/A	N/A
Eurogamer	9/10	N/A	N/A
Game Informer	N/A	8.5/10	N/A
GamePro	N/A	N/A	4.5/5
GameRevolution	A−	N/A	A−
GameSpot	9/10	7.6/10	9.2/10
GameSpy	N/A	4.5/5	5/5
GameTrailers	9/10	N/A	N/A
GameZone	8.5/10	8.5/10	9.5/10
IGN	9.1/10	8.6/10	9.3/10
Official U.S. PlayStation Magazine	N/A	3/5	N/A
Official Xbox Magazine (US)	N/A	N/A	9.6/10
PC Gamer (US)	91%	N/A	N/A
Detroit Free Press	3/4	N/A	N/A
The Sydney Morning Herald	4/5	N/A	N/A

Brothers in Arms: Road to Hill 30 received "generally favorable" reviews, according to review aggregator platform Metacritic.

Philip Morton of Thunderbolt gave the game a perfect 10/10 rating and called it as "exactly what the genre needed". He praised the gameplay that he described as "honed to near-perfection".

However, the game's repetitive gameplay have garnered negative feedback from other critics. Maxim gave the PS2 and Xbox versions a score of 8/10 and wrote that "gamers with short attention spans will likely find all the squad management tedious, but we think it adds a much-needed dimension to a very stale genre".

Detroit Free Press gave the Xbox version 3 out of 4 stars, saying that it "could have been a four-star game, were it not for a couple of things that don't work well. You can press a button to give you an overhead view during missions. But instead of helping to advance the plot, the swirling, zooming view left me dizzy. And the enemy intelligence is set pretty low, meaning they don't pursue you with much cunning".

The Sydney Morning Herald on the other hand, which gave the game 4 out of 5 stars, praised the AI which they described as intelligent, but criticized the redundant gameplay saying that "most encounters are overcome using the same method: laying suppressing fire and flanking".

During the 9th Annual Interactive Achievement Awards, Road to Hill 30 received a nomination for "First-Person Action Game of the Year" by the Academy of Interactive Arts & Sciences.

=== Sales ===
Brothers in Arms: Road to Hill 30 was a commercial success, selling 1.7 million copies by the end of March 2005. Brothers in Arms' computer release received a "Silver" sales award from the Entertainment and Leisure Software Publishers Association (ELSPA), indicating sales of at least 100,000 copies in the United Kingdom.

=== Legacy ===
Brothers in Arms: Road to Hill 30 is considered by many to be one of the best World War II video games and tactical shooters ever made. Gaming sites and critics praised the innovation in gameplay that Brothers in Arms brought into the World War II video game genre, which was already becoming stale and unpopular at that time. During its release, GameSpot called it "one of the best World War II gaming experiences to date". Gamerant ranked it as #7 in its "9 Best World War II Video Games" list, stating that "whereas most World War II shooters tend to focus on mindless action, Brothers in Arms: Road to Hill 30 is all about smart strategy and tactics, and that it "also has a greater focus on character development than other games of its ilk, resulting in one of the more emotionally mature World War II video game narratives available for gamers to experience".

As a historical game, Philip Morton of Thunderbolt praised the game for more accurately and realistically capturing the time period than other games before it. He stated that other games in the genre, such as Call of Duty and Medal of Honor, were Hollywood versions of the War, and described Brothers in Arms as the video game equivalent of Saving Private Ryan and Band of Brothers by being an "authentic and emotional portrayal of war". Morton claimed that it was "without a doubt the best World War II game ever made." Ben Griffin of PC Gamer praised it for its real portrayal of war, describing it as "a great history lesson, effortlessly straddling the line between authentic and enjoyable".
