= Brothers in Arms: Hour of Heroes =

2008 video game

- Developer: Gameloft
- Publisher: Gameloft
- Series: Brothers in Arms
- Platform: iOS
- Release: WW: 23 November 2008
- Genre: Third-person shooter
- Mode: Single-player

Brothers in Arms: Hour of Heroes is a 2008 World War II-era third-person shooter video game for iOS, developed and published by Gameloft. It is a part of the Brothers in Arms series of video games.

It is an updated Brothers in Arms DS port with improved visuals and redone textures to take advantage of the more powerful hardware on mobile devices.

== Gameplay ==
Gameplay in Hour of Heroes. This screenshot show the "2 Pads" control option. The virtual joystick is on the left of the screen, the fire button on the right.

The game offers three methods of control: "Cam Move", "2 Pads" and "Sight Move". In all three modes, movement is controlled by a virtual joystick on the left of the screen, but how the player looks around changes depending on the control method used. In "Cam Move", sight and aim are controlled by swiping across the touchscreen; in "2 Pads" sight and aim are controlled by a virtual joystick on the right of the screen; in "Sight Move", sight and aim are controlled by the player touching the screen to have the character look in that direction. Accelerometer controls for movement are also available in all three control methods.

Players can also crouch, throw grenades, use iron sights, reload, change weapons and shoot using virtual buttons on the touchscreen, and can control two vehicles during the game: an M3 Scout Car and an M4A1 Sherman Tank.

The game has no narrative plot as such. Instead, the player controls an unnamed soldier in the 101st Airborne Division throughout thirteen missions set during World War II. The missions occur during three separate campaigns: Operation Overlord (Normandy), the Tunisia Campaign and the Battle of the Bulge (Ardennes).

== Reception ==
Reception

Aggregate score
Aggregator	Score
GameRankings	69.00%

Review scores
Publication	Score
IGN	6/10
AppSpy	3/5
MacLife	4/5
Slide to Play	3/4
Pocket Gamer	7/10

Hour of Heroes was released to mixed reviews. It holds an aggregate score of 69.00% on GameRankings, based on five reviews.

AppSpy's Kelly Mitchell scored it 3 out of 5, arguing that the game could compete with PlayStation titles graphically, but fell short in terms of gameplay: "Brothers in Arms: Hour of Heroes is an excellent third-person shooter for those who are new to the genre but tends to fall short for those who are familiar with the series, and will leave fans feeling a bit disappointed".

IGN's Levi Buchanan scored the game 6 out of 10. He praised the graphics but was highly critical of the controls: "There is a good game in here, but the awful controls just crush any chance of really getting at it. At no point does it feel natural or comfortable, leading to some unfortunate bumbling".

Pocket Gamer's Tracy Erickson scored it 7 out of 10, giving it a "Bronze Award". He, too, was critical of the controls, arguing that they are so bad as to almost ruin the otherwise excellent game: "The controls are really what do Hour of Heroes in. Despite the game's stellar action and wealth of features, including achievements and bonus weapons, dysfunctional controls turn a gold medal into a silver one. Adjusting to its inadequacies is possible but shouldn't be necessary. It wins the war, but only at a cost".

Slide to Play's Steve Palley was more impressed, scoring it 3 out of 4. He was also critical of the controls but concluded that "overall, Brothers in Arms: Hour of Heroes is an ambitious game that gets a lot more right than it does wrong. It's good for three to five hours of high-octane fighting, interspersed with some truly spectacular moments. It's a pricey buy at $9.99, but it delivers the goods in a way that is next to impossible to find on the App Store".

MacLife's Zack Stern was also impressed, scoring it 4 out of 5 and praising the controls, graphics and gameplay: "We never thought an iPhone game could be epic before enlisting with Brothers in Arms. This 3D action title is exciting and fast-paced, even without qualifying "...for the iPhone", like the insult comic dog. It still stumbles sometimes, but this shooter balances the need for simplicity with tense firefights previously only seen on "real" game systems".
