= Parvati (given name) =

- Gender: Female
- Language: Sanskrit

Origin
- Meaning: goddess Parvati
- Region of origin: India

Other names
- Alternative spelling: Parvathi, Parvathy, Parbati

Parvati (Devanagari: पार्वती pārvatī) is a Hindu/Sanskrit Indian feminine given name, which comes from the name of the goddess Parvati. Alternative spellings include Parvathy and Parvathi.

== Notable people with the name ==
- Parvathy Thiruvothu (born 1989), Indian actress, who has appeared in films including Maryan and Bangalore Days
- Parvati Prasad Baruva (1904–1964), Indian Assamese-language poet, lyricist and dramatist
- Parvathy Baul (born 1976), Indian Bengali-language singer, musician and storyteller
- Parvathy Jayadevan, Indian Malayalam-language playback singer
- Parvathy Jayaram (born 1970), Indian actress
- Parvati Khan (née Maharaj), Indian-Trinidadian singer
- Parvathi Krishnan (1919–2014), Indian politician
- Parvati Kumari, Indian classical Sufi music singer
- Parvati Melton, American-Indian actress, who has appeared in Telugu and Malayalam films
- Parvathy Nair (born 1991), Indian actress, who has appeared in films including Story Kathe and Yennai Arindhaal
- Parvathy Ratheesh, Indian Malayalam actress
- Parvathy Omanakuttan (born 1987) is an Indian Bollywood actress, model and the winner of the 2008 Miss India pageant
- Parvati Shallow (born 1982), American television personality
- Parvathy Soman (born 1997), Indian singer
- Parbati Barua, Indian conservationist, known for Queen of the Elephants BBC documentary
- Parbati Charan Das (1923–1949), first Kargil martyr of India, made supreme sacrifice when trying to cross river Indus in October 1949
- Parbati Chaudhary, member of 2nd Nepalese Constituent Assembly
- Parbati Giri (1926–1995), nicknamed the Mother Teresa of Western Odisha, was a prominent female freedom fighter from Odisha, India
- Parvathi Nayar (born 1964), Chennai born and based visual artist and creative writer
- Parvati Thapa (born 1970), Nepalese sports shooter
- Parvati Devi Deskit Wangmo (born 1934), Queen mother of Ladakh and Ladakh politician

== Fictional characters ==
- Parvati Patil, from J.K. Rowling's Harry Potter series
- Parvati "Paro" Chakraborty, from Sarat Chandra Chattopadhyay's 1917 novella, Devdas
- Parvati Wasatch, another name of Janice Soprano from the HBO TV series The Sopranos
- Parvati Holcomb, a possible companion character in the video game The Outer Worlds

== See also ==
- Parvatibai
