= Parvati (disambiguation) =

Parvati is a major goddess in Hinduism.

Parvati, Parvathi or Parvathy may also refer to:

== People and characters ==
- Parvati (given name), an Indian female given name (including a list of persons and characters with the name)

== Places ==
- Parvati (Vidhan Sabha constituency), one of the Legislative Assembly constituencies of Maharashtra
- Parvati Hill, a hill in Pune, Maharashtra
- Parvati River (Himachal Pradesh)
- Parvati Valley, an Indian river valley in Himachal Pradesh
- Parvathi Puthannaar, a canal in Kerala
- Pin Parvati Pass, a mountain pass in Himachal Pradesh

== Other uses ==
- Parbati River (disambiguation)
- 2847 Parvati, a main-belt asteroid

== See also ==
- Parbat (film), 1952 Indian film
