= Tiny Tina =

Tiny Tina may refer to:

- Tina Arena, an Australian singer, songwriter, actress, and television personality
- Tiny Tina (character), a fictional character from the Borderlands video game series
