= What Goes Up (disambiguation) =

What Goes Up is a 2009 American comedy-drama film starring Hilary Duff and Steve Coogan.

What Goes Up may also refer to:

- "What Goes Up" (short story), a 1956 science fiction short story by Arthur C. Clarke
- "What Goes Up..." (The Batman), a 2008 television episode
- "What Goes Up..." (The Brady Bunch), a 1970 television episode
- "What Goes Up..." (Bugs), a 1996 television episode
- "What Goes Up..." (Doc), a 2025 television episode

== See also ==
- "What Goes Up Must Come Down," an episode of the U.S. Claymation television series Bump in the Night
- Must Come Down, a 2012 independent film
