= Ashly Burch =

American actress and television writer (born 1990)

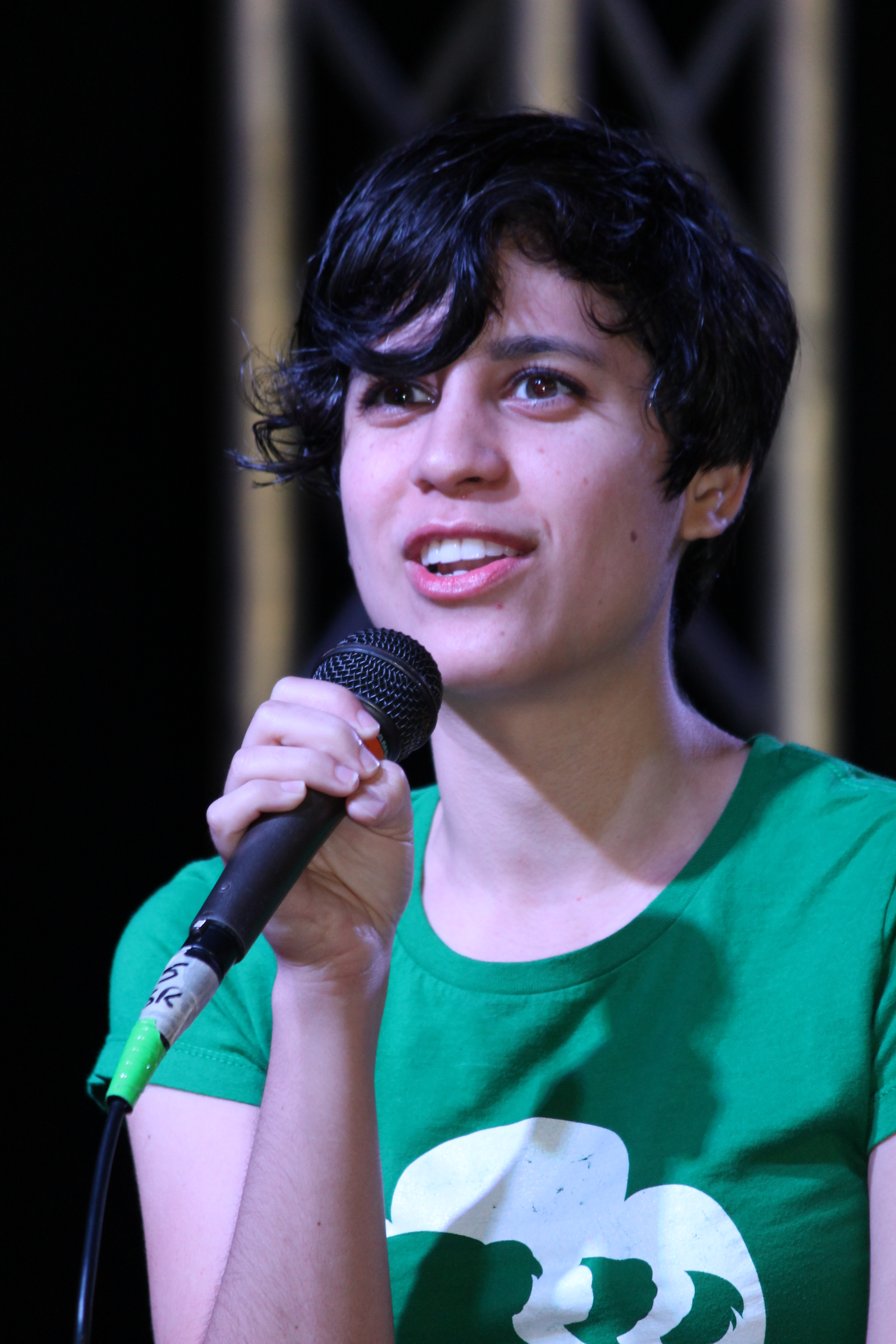
- Burch at Florida Supercon in 2014
- Born: June 19, 1990 (age 36); Phoenix, Arizona, U.S.
- Education: Occidental College
- Occupations: Actress; singer; television writer
- Years active: 2007–present
- Notable work: Hey Ash, Whatcha Playin'?
- Spouse: Mort Burke (m. 2025)
- Relatives: Anthony Burch (brother)

Ashly Burch (born June 19, 1990) is an American actress, writer, director, and singer. She is known for her roles as Aloy in the Horizon series, Chloe Price in the Life Is Strange series, Tiny Tina in the Borderlands series, Mel in The Last of Us Part II, Miss Pauling in Team Fortress 2, the web series Hey Ash, Whatcha Playin'?, Enid Mettle in OK K.O.! Let's Be Heroes, Molly McGee in The Ghost and Molly McGee, Ash Graven in Final Space, Cassie Rose in Minecraft: Story Mode, the Rutile Twins in Steven Universe, Rachel Meyee in Mythic Quest, Cassie Cage in Mortal Kombat X and Ray in Fortnite.

== Early life ==
Burch grew up in Phoenix, Arizona, and has an older brother, Anthony. Her mother is an immigrant from Thailand whom she describes as spiritual, giving food to spirits and praying to them. She credits her career path as a voice actress to playing Metal Gear Solid at age 12. Upon seeing voice actor David Hayter's name alongside that of the main characters, she looked him up and realized that there were actual people who voiced the characters, as she realized that was what she wanted to do as a career. She graduated from Occidental College in Los Angeles in 2012.

== Career ==
Burch started Hey Ash, Whatcha Playin'?, a sketch comedy show focused on video games, with her brother Anthony in 2008. She got her first voice acting role when Anthony was hired as a writer for Borderlands 2 and suggested she try out for the role of Tiny Tina. For Life Is Strange, she was cast in the role of Chloe Price, after having also auditioned for the roles of Max Caulfield, Victoria Chase and Kate Marsh. She later said that she was surprised by what she could do and had the "opportunity to do in voiceover".

Burch was a writer on Cartoon Network's Adventure Time. She co-wrote episodes such as "The Hall of Egress" and "Islands Part 4: Imaginary Resources", the latter winning a Primetime Emmy Award. She was also a writer of an Adventure Time graphic novel released in October 2016. The same year, she would voice characters in animation including Kamala Khan / Ms. Marvel in Lego Marvel's Avengers, April O'Neil in Teenage Mutant Ninja Turtles: Mutants in Manhattan, Hana in Star Ocean: Integrity and Faithlessness, and Quacho Queen in World of Final Fantasy.

Her work in Life Is Strange and Horizon Zero Dawn won her the 2015 and 2017 Golden Joystick Awards for Best Performance. She was also the host of Geek & Sundry's Unplugged series. Since 2020, she has portrayed Rachel Meyee on the Apple TV series Mythic Quest, in which she also serves as a writer. She later described her voicing of Tiny Tina, Chloe, and Aloy as "three seminal step ups" that helped her "become a better actor". In 2023, she reprised her voice acting of Aloy in the video game Horizon Call of the Mountain. She also voiced Tiny Tina in Tiny Tina's Wonderlands and Borderlands: The Pre-Sequel, and Chloe in Life Is Strange: Before the Storm's DLC, Farewell. She would later voice characters in video games such as Afterparty, Street Fighter character Chun-Li in Marvel vs. Capcom: Infinite and Teppen, Marvel Ultimate Alliance 3: The Black Order, and Final Fantasy XV.

She has voiced various characters in animation and anime. This included voicing Ridley in Glitch Techs, Enid Mettle and multiple other characters in OK K.O.! Let's Be Heroes, and the Rutile Twins in Steven Universe. She voiced multiple characters in Bee and PuppyCat, Ash Graven in Final Space, Lainey in The Loud House, and characters in other productions. In 2018, Burch left her voice acting role of Mayuri Shiina for the English dub of Steins;Gate 0, who she had voiced from episodes 1-13 and credited as "Jackie Ross", citing scheduling conflicts, and apologized to fans. She voiced Sasha Braus in the English dub of the first three seasons of Attack on Titan.

In 2020, it was announced that she had signed on to write for the animated show, The Legend of Vox Machina. Burch stated that she had a recording booth at her home, which allowed her to work remotely during the COVID-19 pandemic. That same year she voiced Danika Hart in Spider-Man: Miles Morales, Viper in Valorant, Jane in Ninjala, Mel in The Last of Us Part II, Musher in The Red Lantern, and Kate Bishop / Hawkeye in Marvel's Avengers.

In 2021, she began voicing Molly McGee, the protagonist of The Ghost and Molly McGee. She sings the series theme song, with co-star Dana Snyder, and musical numbers in other episodes. The show's creative team based the character around her life. Burch praised the series for "showcasing different aspects of Thai culture" and said that voicing Molly McGee was the first time she had voiced a character that reflected her heritage.

In December 2022, Burch was announced as a co-creator and writer of the Mythic Quest spinoff series Mere Mortals, later renamed to Side Quest, and was released in March 2025.

== Personal life ==
Burch dated Must Come Down co-star David Fetzer until his death in 2012 by accidental opioid overdose. She discussed this event as well as her own personal mental health problems during her appearance on Paul Gilmartin's The Mental Illness Happy Hour podcast and on Brian W. Foster's show Between the Sheets on Critical Role's YouTube channel. She suffers from chronic anxiety and credits her love of video games to playing Harvest Moon as a child as it was the only thing able to calm her down. She has spoken several times about her anxiety and the positive impact video games had on it. On July 1, 2022, Burch came out as queer and pansexual, saying that coming out felt important "for reasons I can't really explain" and that she had been dating a man for five years. She said it probably is not a shock because "half the characters I play are members of the rainbow fam", with some calling her every "queer nerd's favorite nerd".

Burch is married to comedian Mort Burke. They have hosted the weekly podcast Rebrand together since 2024.

== Acting roles ==
=== Video games ===
Year	Title	Role	Notes	Ref.
2012	Awesomenauts	Ayla		
2012	Borderlands 2	Tiny Tina, The Bane		
2013	Aliens: Colonial Marines	Lisa Reid		
2013	TowerFall	Last of the Order		
2013	Saints Row IV	Herself (Ashly Burch)	Hey Ash, Whatcha Playin'? DLC	
2014	Persona Q: Shadow of the Labyrinth	Rei		
2014	Team Fortress 2	Miss Pauling	Also wrote the short for Expiration Date	
2014	Project Spark	Avalon	Credited as Ashley Burch	
2014	Borderlands: The Pre-Sequel	Tiny Tina, Schmidt		
2015	Saints Row: Gat out of Hell	Demons, Husks, Kiki DeWynter		
2015	Gravity Ghost	Iona, Pepper, Sorrel		
2015	The Legend of Heroes: Trails of Cold Steel	Millium Orion		
2015	Life Is Strange	Chloe Price, Stella Hill, Taylor Christensen, Sarah		
2015	There Came an Echo	Val		
2015	Mortal Kombat X	Cassie Cage		
2015	The Magic Circle	Coda Soliz		
2015	Persona 4: Dancing All Night	Rise Kujikawa	Replacing Laura Bailey	
2015	Fallout 4	Tina De Luca, Rowdy, Cricket		
2016	Rise of the Tomb Raider	Nadia	Baba Yaga DLC	
2016	The Legend of Heroes: Trails of Cold Steel II	Millium Orion		
2016	Lego Marvel's Avengers	Kamala Khan / Ms. Marvel		
2016	Battleborn	Orendi		
2016	Teenage Mutant Ninja Turtles: Mutants in Manhattan	April O'Neil		
2016	Minecraft: Story Mode	Cassie Rose	Episode: "A Portal to Mystery"	
2016	Star Ocean: Integrity and Faithlessness	Hana		
2016	World of Final Fantasy	Quacho Queen		
2017	Horizon Zero Dawn	Aloy, Elisabet Sobeck		
2017	Guardians of the Galaxy: The Telltale Series	Nebula		
2017	Pit People	Sofia, Hailey, Vampiress, Spidaur		
2017	Fortnite	Ray, Desiree, Dark Ray	Save The World	
2017	Marvel vs. Capcom: Infinite	Chun-Li	Replacing Laura Bailey	
2017	Dota 2	Dark Willow		
2017	Life Is Strange: Before the Storm	Chloe Price	Episode: "Farewell"	
2018	OK K.O.! Let's Play Heroes	Enid Mettle		
2018	Final Fantasy XV	Sarah		
2019	Afterparty	Sam Hill		
2019	Teppen	Chun-Li		
2019	Marvel Ultimate Alliance 3: The Black Order	Nebula		
2019	Borderlands 3	Tiny Tina		
2019	The Blackout Club	Isabela Madi-Shaw ("Bells"), Prank Call Voice		
2019	The Outer Worlds	Parvati Holcomb		
2020	Valorant	Viper		
2020	The Last of Us Part II	Mel		
2020	Ninjala	Jane		
2020	The Red Lantern	Musher		
2020	Spider-Man: Miles Morales	Danika Hart		
2020	Marvel's Avengers	Kate Bishop / Hawkeye	DLC	
2022	Horizon Forbidden West	Aloy, Beta, Elisabet Sobeck		
2022	Tiny Tina's Wonderlands	Tiny Tina		
2023	Horizon Call of the Mountain	Aloy		
2023	Spider-Man 2	Danika Hart		
2024	Lego Horizon Adventures	Aloy		
2025	Date Everything!	Zoey Bennett		

=== Film ===
Year	Title	Role	Notes	Ref.
2021	DC Showcase: Blue Beetle	Nightshade	Short film	
2023	The Super Mario Bros. Movie	Additional voices		
2024	We're All Gonna Die	Thalia		
2024	Justice League: Crisis on Infinite Earths	Nightshade, Mera	Direct-to-video	

=== Animation ===
Year	Title	Role	Notes	Ref.
2013	Tooth Fairy - Kud	Boy, Bedwet Fairy	English dub of Dutch internet animation	
2013–2022	Bee and PuppyCat	Cass, Cicada		
2014	Blackford Manor	Josette Grey		
2014	Chainsaw Richard	Tiny Ghost		
2014	Over the Garden Wall	Additional voices		
2014	Expiration Date	Miss Pauling		
2014–2018	Adventure Time	Various voices	Also writer	
2015–2018	Pig Goat Banana Cricket	Lila Twinklepipes, Sorority Girl No. 1, Various		
2016–2017	We Bare Bears	Additional Voices		
2017–2018	Steven Universe	Rutile Twins		
2017–2019	OK K.O.! Let's Be Heroes	Enid Mettle, Punching Judy, Ms. Mummy, Rippy Roo, Plazamo, Shy Ninja, Mikayla, Glitter Starlight, additional voices	Also shorts and television series	
2019	Trolls: The Beat Goes On!	Meadow Springs		
2019–2021	Final Space	Ash Graven		
2020	The Loud House	Lainey		
2020	Glitch Techs	Ridley, K. Moon, additional voices	Also writer	
2020	Adventure Time: Distant Lands	Darling, Additional Voices		
2020	Hailey's On It!	Hailey Banks	Pilot only	
2021–2024	The Ghost and Molly McGee	Molly McGee, additional voices	Lead role	
2022	Dragon Age: Absolution	Qwydion	Main role	
2022–present	The Legend of Vox Machina	—N/a	Writer	
2022–present	Chibiverse	Molly McGee	Recurring role	
2025–present	Fionna and Cake	Huntress Wizard		

=== Live-action ===
Year	Title	Role	Notes	Ref.
2008–2019	Hey Ash, Whatcha Playin'?	Ash	Also creator, writer and executive producer	
2012	Must Come Down	Holly		
2015	The Mask You Live In	Herself	Documentary	
2015	Muzzled the Musical	Malfalia	Musical	
2015–2016	RocketJump: The Show	Female Assistant, Super Lieutenant, Jess	Also writer	
2016–2022	Critical Role (one-shots)	Various	5 episodes	
2016–2022	Critical Role (campaign two)	Keg	Guest role; 4 episodes	
2017	Dimension 404	Shannon	Episode: "Cinethrax"	
2020–2025	Mythic Quest	Rachel Meyee	Also staff writer, director, co-producer	
2023	Candela Obscura (Chapter 3: "The Circle of Tide & Bone")	Dr. Elsie Roberts	Main cast; 3 episodes	
2025–present	I'm Happy You're Here	Herself	Main cast	
2025	It's Always Sunny in Philadelphia	—N/a	Director: "Overage Drinking: A National Concern"	

=== Commercials ===
Year	Title	Role	Notes	Ref.
2022	State Farm	Herself	Super Sparkle	
2022	State Farm	Herself	Yours Now	
2022	State Farm	Herself	Fake Streamer	

=== Anime dubbing ===
Year	Title	Role	Notes	Ref.
2012	Steins;Gate	Mayuri Shiina	Also film (credited as Jackie Ross)	
2013	Code:Breaker	Sakura Sakurakoji	Credited as Jackie Ross	
2014	Space Dandy	Freckles	Ep. 17	
2014–2019	Attack on Titan	Sasha Braus	Replaced by Megan Shipman	
2015	Attack on Titan: Junior High	Sasha Braus		
2018	Steins;Gate 0	Mayuri Shiina	Credited as Jackie Ross, ep 1–13	

== Awards and nominations ==
Year	Award	Category	Title	Result	Ref.
2013	D.I.C.E. Awards	Outstanding Character Performance - Male or Female	Borderlands 2	Nominated	
2015	Golden Joystick Award	Performance of the Year	Life Is Strange	Won	
2015	The Game Awards	Performance of the Year	Life Is Strange	Nominated	
2016	British Academy Games Awards	Performer	Life Is Strange	Nominated	
2016	Primetime Emmy Awards	Outstanding Short Form Animated Program	Adventure Time: The Hall of Egress	Nominated	
2017	Primetime Emmy Awards	Outstanding Short Form Animated Program	Adventure Time: Islands Part 4: Imaginary Resources	Won	
2017	Golden Joystick Award	Best Gaming Performance	Horizon Zero Dawn	Won	
2017	Golden Joystick Award	Breakout Performance	Horizon Zero Dawn	Won	
2017	The Game Awards	Best Performance	Horizon Zero Dawn	Nominated	
2018	PlayStation.Blog Game of the Year Awards	Best Performance	Horizon Zero Dawn	Won	
2018	D.I.C.E. Awards	Outstanding Achievement in Character	Horizon Zero Dawn	Nominated	
2018	British Academy Games Awards	Performer	Horizon Zero Dawn	Nominated	
2019	The Game Awards	Best Performance	The Outer Worlds	Nominated	
2022	Golden Joystick Awards	Best Performance	Tiny Tina's Wonderlands	Nominated	
2022	The Game Awards	Best Performance	Horizon Forbidden West	Nominated	
2023	Game Audio Network Guild Awards	Best Voice Performance	Horizon Forbidden West	Won	
2023	D.I.C.E. Awards	Outstanding Achievement in Character	Horizon Forbidden West	Nominated	
