= Hey Ash, Whatcha Playin'? =

Sketch comedy web series

- Genre: Video game sketch comedy Surreal comedy
- Created by: Anthony Burch; Ashly Burch
- Starring: Ashly Burch; Anthony Burch; David Burch; Leigh Davis
- Ending theme: "The Massacre" by Fantomenk
- Country of origin: United States
- Original language: English
- No. of seasons: 5
- No. of episodes: 125 (+ 11 specials)

Production
- Executive producers: Anthony Burch; Ashly Burch; Justin Yngelmo
- Camera setup: Single-camera
- Running time: 1–3 minutes
- Production company: HAWP Productions

Original release
- Network: YouTube (2011-present)
- Release: May 29, 2008 – August 28, 2019

Hey Ash, Whatcha Playin'? (HAWP) is an independently produced series of sketch comedy videos created by siblings Anthony Burch and Ashly Burch. The series uses surreal humor and comical sibling rivalry to examine the themes, industry trends, and societal impact of video games, with each episode typically focusing on a single game. HAWP was hosted on Destructoid for its first year of production, and syndicated to GameTrailers until 2013, and has since become independently distributed, most notably on YouTube. As of September 2020, the series has received over 60 million views.

== History ==
Hey Ash, Whatcha Playin'? was conceived during the summer of 2008, while Ashly and Anthony Burch still lived at home with their parents in Phoenix, Arizona. Anthony Burch was a game reviewer at Destructoid, his Rev Rant video features expressing his opinions of tropes commonly seen in contemporary games. Having established an audience on the website, he posted the first HAWP episode on May 28, 2008. The siblings collaborated over the course of the summer to produce one episode per week, playing mildly exaggerated versions of themselves: Anthony using his deadpan, fast-spoken, strongly opinionated nature, and Ashly antagonizing him both verbally and physically. Over time, as the siblings fine-tuned the comedy and timing of the show, these aspects have come to define their characters.

Discussing the genesis of the series, Anthony states:

Ash and I got the idea for HAWP during the summer; our total lack of shit to do meant we could film an episode every week, and subsequently get the Destructoid community to acknowledge our presence through sheer force of quantity. It would have been easy for Destructoid to forget about us if we'd just filmed an episode every month, or something.

Ashly Burch describes the nature of their collaboration:

It was incredibly fun. Anthony and I had never really collaborated in that way, just the two of us, before, and I really enjoyed it. Looking back on those first episodes, I think they pale in comparison to the quality of the ones in our current season—i.e., there are less dead-baby jokes—but I like reviewing them occasionally to see what worked in them. Primarily, it's the dynamic we managed to establish between me and Anthony that I liked the best.

Since the latter half of the second season, friend and occasional contributor Justin Yngelmo has been credited as co-writer, director, and editor of the series.

A short film collaboration between the Hey Ash crew and Freddie Wong premiered at the 2014 Sundance Film Festival as part of Nintendo's official contribution.

== Format ==
Almost every episode begins with Ashly, comfortably seated with a controller, as her brother walks up behind her and title-drops the show. Ashly then answers him with the episode's game in a childlike accent. All audio here is supplemented with a game font, and the camera abruptly clips to the content of the week's episode.

The episodes vary in tone, but usually incorporate a great deal of surreal humor. For instance, in one early episode, Ashly re-enacts aspects of Super Mario World 2: Yoshi's Island, strapping a toy child to her back and crushing cupcakes with her posterior on a countertop. Another early episode involves her re-enacting portions of Professor Layton, involving her poking around for hint coins and solving a bizarre puzzle that involves prostitutes. As the seasons progressed, the comedy was tightened through advances in editing and script-writing, and Justin Yngelmo added production value and a refined approach to the creation of new episodes.

Each episode ends with credits in the same font, sometimes involving a line or two of amusing commentary. After DVD releases or other projects by the siblings, promotional notice is given for a slide or two. As of Season Two, the ending theme song was changed to "The Massacre" by chiptune artist FantomenK, to avoid copyright infringement. Occasionally, a brief stinger will appear, after which the credits will finish.

== Characters ==
=== Ashly Burch ===
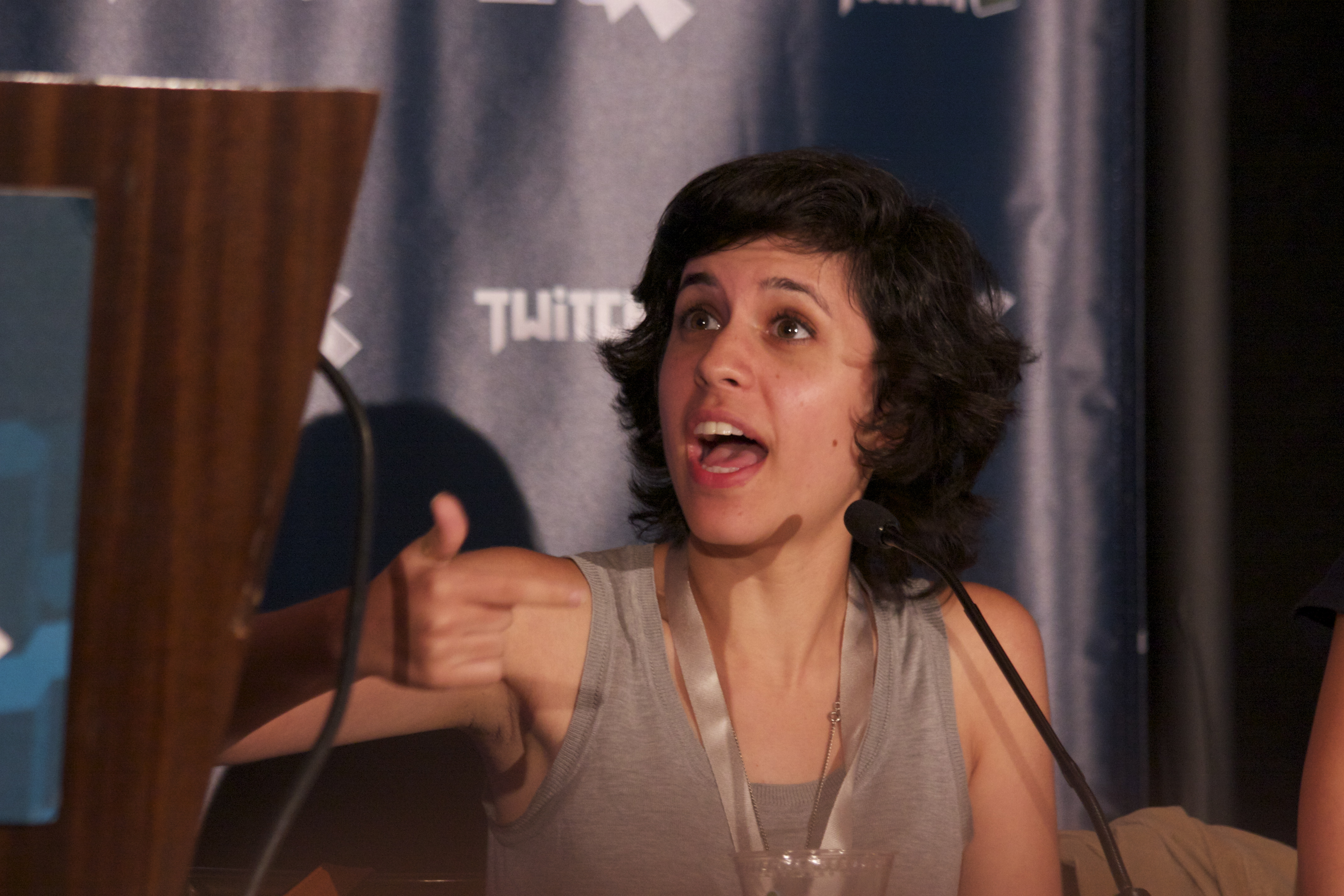
Ashly Burch in 2013

Manic, wild Ashly Burch, the eponymous "Ash" of the show's title, plays the unhinged Burch sibling. She regularly and unrelentingly antagonizes her brother, characterizing him on-camera as weak and effeminate. She is usually supported in her frequent bashing of his character by inaction from anyone else present, to his vocal chagrin. On some occasions, a character usurps her, or she will accidentally place herself in a position of detriment: examples include The Sims pool scene at the hands of Leigh Davis, Papa Burch's effortless position above her such as in The Lord of the Rings episode, or Ashly accidentally defecating in her own bed while attempting to ruin Anthony's room.

=== Anthony Burch ===
Anthony Burch, usually portrayed as the single sane character of the series, acts as a foil to Ashly. He is almost always the recipient of his sister's lunacy and absurdity, and usually ignores or calls sarcastic attention to her wild actions. Other characters often comment that he smells bad. If a character is wounded in any episode, it will typically be Anthony, who will fail to receive any aid from the others.

=== Papa Burch ===
Breakout cameo character Papa Burch (David Burch) is the patriarch of the Burch household, and an avid reader of romance novels. In one early episode, he was shown to have an encyclopedic knowledge of the Twilight Saga, and is usually given a brief one-or-two line appearance per episode. His minimal involvement in the show lends greater comedy to his short appearances, and he appears to be the progenitor of both Ashly's loose grip on reality and Anthony's deadpan attitude. He attends panels focused on his children's work and is a consistent fan favorite.

=== Leigh Davis ===
Leigh Davis is the creator and producer of Once Upon a Pixel, a spin-off web series dedicated to re-envisioning video game characters and plots in a fairy tale-esque approach. She was the real-life wife of Anthony Burch making the transition from girlfriend to fiance on-camera during the surprise intro to The Sims episode of HAWP. Her character shows an adoring and wide-eyed attitude towards the antics of the siblings, but on two occasions, she has shown a darker side by fatally threatening Ashly Burch. While she was initially an extra in the early episodes, her presence has gradually increased, and now she is usually seen in each episode until the season 5 finale following her real life divorce from Anthony Burch.

== Reception ==
Hey Ash, Whatcha Playin'? has received positive reviews since its inception. The cast regularly appears at the Penny Arcade Expo conventions to meet with fans and discuss the evolution of video game culture. Video game voice actor David Hayter, the voice actor of Solid Snake in the Metal Gear Solid series, contributed his voice to the Season One finale.

== Other work ==
Anthony Burch is an employee at Rocket Jump; he took the position after leaving his former post as a writer at video game developer Gearbox Software. He was the lead writer for Borderlands 2. Anthony is also the co-writer and co-star of the defunct web series "Anthony Saves the World", and contributed to the Telltale Games' episodic adventure, Tales From the Borderlands. He worked for Riot Games, Visual Concepts and Santa Monica Studio.

Ashly Burch has starred in several small shorts as well as a 2012 feature-film, Must Come Down, written by Kenny Riches and produced by Patrick Fugit. She also lent her voice to Tiny Tina, a non-playable character in Borderlands 2, as well as the Bane, a "cursed" gun that yells annoying sounds and phrases while severely restricting the user's movement. In addition, she provided the voices of Ayla in the game Awesomenauts Reid in Aliens: Colonial Marines, and Miss Pauling in Valve's Team Fortress 2 short videos. Ashly voiced Chloe Price in Dontnod Entertainment's video game Life Is Strange, for which she won a Golden Joystick Award. Most recently Burch voiced the protagonist, Aloy in Horizon Zero Dawn, which won her two Golden Joystick Awards and got her a nomination at The Game Awards.

The three HAWP-characters Papa, Anthony and Ashly Burch were all featured as Downloadable Content for the 2013 video game Saints Row IV. They were all voiced by the original cast and could be called by phone to help the player out in battle or to just hang out with. They can be called separately, however when called together they converse with each other in similar ways as in Hey Ash, Whatcha Playin'?.

Leigh Davis currently produces a Web Comic named JailBird as well as running her own website oddlookingbird.com.

== HAWPcast & HeyAshTwitch ==
The show is also the subject of the podcast "HAWPcast", originally involving only Anthony and Ashly Burch, but expanded to include Leigh Davis and Justin Yngelmo, among others. It was updated infrequently and typically surrounded video game philosophy as well as various insights into their lives and backstories, usually around an hour long apiece. The standard HAWPcasts at one point were almost completely replaced by a format called "Keepin' It Real" where the HAWP crew interviewed notable members of the game industry. Regular HAWPcasts returned in 2015 but ceased in 2016. The HAWPcast was often streamed on their Twitch channel.

== Episodes ==
Upload dates refer to the date the episode was uploaded to GameTrailers.com.

=== Season 1 (2008–2009) ===
No.	Title	Upload date	Description
1	Ikaruga	May 29, 2008	Ash plays through Treasure's greatest shooter, as Anthony begins to loathe it.
2	Zelda	June 4, 2008	Based on a true story, and thus significantly less zany than the other episodes.
3	Bioshock	June 10, 2008	A teenage girl reenacts the climactic scene from BioShock, to her brother's chagrin.
4	Father's Day	June 17, 2008	A (at the time, and possibly now) late Father's Day message from Anthony and Ashly.
5	Prof. Layton	June 24, 2008	Ashly and her brother embark on a Professor Layton and the Curious Village-themed adventure.
6	Smash Bros.	July 1, 2008	Ashly Burch is the worst Super Smash Bros Brawl teammate in history.
7	Final Fight	July 8, 2008	The horror…
8	E3 2008	July 22, 2008	Anthony is at E3, and Ashly is bored.
9	Dark Knight	July 28, 2008	Ashly is frustrated that a Dark Knight tie-in game has not yet been released.
10	Braid	September 3, 2008	Ashly uses tactics learned from Jon Blow's Braid to correct a horrible mistake.
11	Team Fortress 2	September 10, 2008	There's a spy sappin' Ash's sentry.
12	???	September 17, 2008	For neither the first nor last time, Anthony has no idea what the hell Ash is doing.
13	Guitar Hero	October 1, 2008	Ashly activates star power.
14	Text Adventures	October 15, 2008	Ash is in a maze of twisting passages, all alike.
15	A Brother in Need	October 29, 2008	For once, Ash decides to be helpful.
16	Left 4 Dead	November 12, 2008	Ash and Anthony are going to have to cooperate.
17	I Love Videogames	November 26, 2008	Ash lists the things she's thankful for.
18	Fan Service, of a Sort	December 10, 2008	What hath Ash wrought?
19	The HAWP Before Christmas	December 24, 2008	Why aren't there any games about the holidays?
20	2008 in Review	January 7, 2009	Ash and Anthony discuss how last year measured up to the year before it.
21	Persona 3	January 21, 2009	A nation mourns.
22	Animal Crossing	February 4, 2009	No resetting.
23	Left 4 Dead Part 2	February 18, 2009	Ash shows off her strategic mind.
24	Geometry Wars 2	March 4, 2009	Ash brings two young lovers together.
25	Of Sexism	March 18, 2009	A flashback reveals Ash's machinations.
26	30 Seconds of Screaming	April 1, 2009	Never accuse Ash of false advertising.
27	Yoshi's Cookie	April 15, 2009	Ash stuffs her face in a spoof on this classic video game.
28	The New Gamer Dictionary	April 30, 2009	Like Webster's, but with more references to Metal Gear.
29	Street Fighter IV	May 13, 2009	Ash and Anthony pay homage to the king of all fighting games.
30	Lips	May 27, 2009	Some songs we need not sing.
31	Katamari Damacy	June 3, 2009	Sometimes life isn't funny.
32	Trauma Center	June 25, 2009	Video gamer, heal thyself.
33	Once Upon a Pixel	July 8, 2009	Who says fairy tales can't include walking nuclear tanks?
34	Like Big Boss	July 22, 2009	Dear God, we hope this still feels relevant.
35	Metal Gear Solid 4	August 5, 2009	The end begins.
36	The Sons of Big Boss	August 19, 2009	Can epic music make up for spectacularly bad martial artistry? Your call.

=== Season 2 (2009–2010) ===
No.	Title	Upload Date	Description
1	Viva Pinata	Sep 6, 2009	Fathers can game too!
2	Little King's Story	Oct 9, 2009	Anthony and Ashly Burch enjoy video games, surreal humor, cupcakes, and video games. In that order.
3	Scene It?	Oct 23, 2009	The Burches enter the sordid world of DVD board games.
4	Penny Arcade Expo 2009	Nov 6, 2009	Ash pitches her movie idea.
5	Uncharted 2: Among Thieves	Nov 20, 2009	Enough mind-bending similarities to Firefly to detonate your dome?
6	Left 4 Dead 2	Dec 4, 2009	The ballad of the Boomer.
7	Preggers	Dec 18, 2009	Casual gaming has grave consequences.
8	Overlooked Games of 2009	Jan 4, 2010	Spend your time in 2010 living in the past with the best overlooked games from 2009!
9	The Most Dangerous Game	Jan 15, 2010	Pokémon is a very dangerous game.
10	Shadow Complex	Feb 1, 2010	Ash struggles with an artist's homophobia while considering the purchase of Shadow Complex.
11	Rock Band	Feb 12, 2010	These days, anyone can start a band.
12	Psychonauts	Feb 26, 2010	Ash dives into your brain!
13	Heavy Rain	Mar 12, 2010	Papa Burch plays the future of interactive storytelling.
14	1 vs 100	Mar 28, 2010	Ash faces a truly impossible question.
15	Puzzle Quest	Apr 9, 2010	Ash exploits Anthony's visual handicap.
16	Sleep is Death	Apr 23, 2010	Ash totally ruins an art game.
17	Mother's Day	May 8, 2010	Ashly's mom gets in on the action.
18	The Ballad of Bullet Bill	May 21, 2010	What dark, crass thoughts dwell in the twisted mind of a Bullet Bill obsessed with one infamous plumber?
19	The Sims	Jun 5, 2010	Ashly Burch and Ashley Davis are different people. Did you know?
20	Far Cry 2	Jun 18, 2010	Ash has her own reasons for liking Far Cry 2.
21	Fable II	Jul 6, 2010	Dad finishes Fable II in his own special way.
22	Gears of War	Jul 20, 2010	Anthony describes creative new uses for Imulsion in his Gears of War fan fiction.
23	Ico	Jul 30, 2010	Ash celebrates Fumito Ueada's contributions to feminism.
24	Mass Effect 2	Aug 13, 2010	Ash doesn't take well to psychology and Papa Burch has his own priorities.
25	Rhythm Heaven	Aug 27, 2010	Ash drops an infectious beat with explosive consequences.
26	Monkey Island	Sep 4, 2010	It's Dad's party and he'll play what he wants to.
27	Adventure Games Part I	Sep 25, 2010	The season finale begins. What would Guybrush do?
28	Adventure Games Pt. 2	Nov 9, 2010	In the Season 2 finale, Ash channels the spirit of Guybrush to sort out Nathan Drake and Marcus Fenix.

=== Season 3 (2011–2012) ===
No.	Title	Upload date	Description	Notes
1	World of Warcraft	February 11, 2011	Ash questions Anthony's marital relationship.	
2	Best Characters of 2010	February 28, 2011	In the words of Geoff Keighly: "frightful fappucino."	Originally premiered on Spike TV.
3	Harvest Moon 64	March 11, 2011	So many babes, so little time.	
4	Limbo	March 25, 2011	If Ash were stuck in a dark forest, would you save her?	
5	Red Faction: Guerrilla	April 8, 2011	Ash, Anthony, and Dad consider the merits of guerrilla warfare.	
6	Ash at Gearbox Software (Part 1)	April 22, 2011	Anthony brings Ash into the offices of Gearbox Software. What could go wrong?	
7	Red Dead Redemption	May 7, 2011	You gotta know when to fold 'em.	
8	Nintendoland	May 13, 2011	Welcome to Ash's theme park.	Originally premiered on Spike TV.
9	Ash at Gearbox Software (Part 2)	June 3, 2011	Games aren't made by just one person. Except for games Brent works on.	
10	E3 2011: Booth Babes	June 9, 2011	It's about booth babes.	
11	E3 2011: Sellin' Out	June 9, 2011	With Super Amazo Special Guests. Two of them.	
12	E3 2011: Happiest Place	June 10, 2011	In which GameTrailers regrets hiring us.	
13	Toonstruck	June 17, 2011	Dad never told the kids about the time he met Christopher Lloyd - now with bloopers!	
14	Gearbox Software Part III	July 1, 2011	Where's Duke? Ash uses her feminine charms to find the king.	
15	Cooking Mama	July 15, 2011	Ash and Anthony learn to cook with Mom!	
16	New Gamer Dictionary Part II	July 29, 2011	Time for another round of new gaming definitions!	
17	Minecraft	August 12, 2011	Anthony asks for Ash's expert help to craft the best mine ever! Will he ever learn?	
18	NBA JAM	August 27, 2011	Anthony knows how to balance the teams. Dad knows how to take out the trash.	Originally premiered at Penny Arcade Expo.
19	Gearbox Software Part IV	September 9, 2011	So, how'd you like the ending of Borderlands?	
20	Lord of the Rings	September 23, 2011	A helpless Anthony suffers through character selection in The Lord of the Rings.	
21	Fallout: New Vegas	October 7, 2011	Should permanent death be included in all games? Ashe [sic] puts this idea to the test.	
22	Left 4 Dead: The Sacrifice	October 21, 2011	The Halloween season begins as Ash pulls the fam together for some Left 4 Dead style sacrificing.	
23	F.E.A.R. 3	November 4, 2011	The horror... the horror.	
24	Davis Helps Out	November 18, 2011	Davis steps in to help as the siblings experience writer's block.	
25	Mischief Makers	December 2, 2011	Ash gains a little more than she bargained for from this plat-uzzler plazz-former.	
26	Deathspank	December 23, 2011	Ash schools us on the real art of comedy in video games.	
27	Scott Pilgrim	January 6, 2012	Ash and Davis sit down for a nice heart-to-heart about wife-beating.	
28	A Death in the Family, Part I	January 27, 2012	Anthony and Ash are attacked by the Foot Clan as the season's villain is revealed!	
29	A Death in the Family, Part II	February 17, 2012	Can Ash save her brother and herself from the ultimate betrayal of Papa Burch? Find out in the Season 3 finale!	

=== Season 4 (2012–2013) ===
No.	Title	Upload date	Description	Notes
1	Rayman Origins	March 16, 2012	Can the happiest and most fun-filled Rayman game possibly have healing powers?	Originally premiered on Spike TV.
2	Best Game of 2011	March 30, 2012	Anthony attempts to compete with an unexpected amount of flawless logic from Ash as the duo nominate the best games of 2011!	
3	Skyrim	April 13, 2012	Ash displays some mad skills that would make the Nine Divines proud.	Originally premiered on Spike TV.
4	Dinner Metaphors	May 4, 2012	Ash cooks up a handful of delicious metaphors for today's modern sandbox games with a little help from Davis!	
5	Hot Slutz	May 18, 2012	Now with more cleavage than ever before…	
6	E3 2012: Live from 3COM	June 6, 2012	Papa Burch hits the floor armed with some hard-hitting questions.	
7	E3 2012: Jesus Christ 64	June 7, 2012	Have you found Jesus? Have you at least played his video game?	
8	E3 2012: Butt Awards	June 8, 2012	Ash and Anthony break down what was butt and what was not butt at E3 2012 in this episode of Hey Ash, Whatcha Playin'?	
9	Driver: San Francisco	June 28, 2012	The power to Shift could not have landed in more dangerous hands	
10	Quantum Conundrum	July 13, 2012	Not even your happy place is safe when Ash gets control of dimensions.	
11	Game of Thrones: The Game	August 3, 2012	Ash and Anthony explore the challenge of staying faithful to a franchise while still making a game fun to play.	
12	Dance Central 2	August 24, 2012	Something's different about Ash's favorite Dance Central character.	
13	Saints Row the Third	September 1, 2012	Sandbox fun for the whole family that may just be too much for Ash to handle in this special episode debuted at the GT Film Festival Panel at PAX Prime 2012!	Originally premiered at PAX 2012.
14	Diablo III	September 21, 2012	The fam confronts Anthony about his addiction to Diablo III.	
15	Batman	October 5, 2012	Arkham's criminals don't stand a chance against the world's greatest detective, Ashly Burch.	
16	Call of Duty: Black Ops II	October 19, 2012	Activision CEO, Ashly Kotick, isn't satisfied unless Black Ops II drops some Shock and Awe on the industry.	
17	Indiana Jones	November 16, 2012	Anthony educates Ashly on the inspiration for the Tomb Raider and Uncharted series, but the lesson plan takes a horrible turn.	
18	Tomb Raider	December 7, 2012	Ash busts the myth that personality is what makes a well-rounded female character.	
19	Civilization V	January 11, 2013	Ash makes a penetrating power play for World Leader in Civ 5.	*Mature Content*
20	Doctor Who	January 18, 2013	Ash reveals Anthony's Timelord nature after discovering that microtransactions are bigger on the inside.	
21	Earthbound	February 22, 2013	Anthony battles writer's block (and Ashly's Earthbound shenanigans), forcing him to look to his progenitor for help.	
22	Girl Games	March 22, 2013	Defeated by the burden of being a girl, Ash tries her hand at some authentic girl games.	
23	Borderlands 2	April 5, 2013	Get your totems ready as Anthony recalls his trials and tribulations from writing Borderlands 2.	
24	Escape Goat	May 3, 2013	Oh the drama! Goats, wizard-rats and a scheming Ashly. What have we wrought!?	
25	Dear Esther	June 25, 2013	The family embarks on a picnic to bond in a way that only a masterful narrative can describe.	Originally premiered at Pacific NerdWest.
26	Sexy Booth Babes	July 12, 2013	Ash and Davis show off some epic sweet-talk skills on the floor of E3 2013. Face it, you'll never be this good at talking to hot girls.	
27	Spy Party	July 26, 2013	What makes Ashly shaken, not stirred? I spy a killer at this party. Burch beware!	
28	Noir	August 13, 2013	A mystery is afoot and P.I. Ash Burch is on the case. Will she uncover the truth or end bottles up in failure.	
29	Unfinished Business (Finale Part 1)	October 23, 2013	Ash receives a lucrative proposition.	
30	Taken to School (Finale Part 2)	October 23, 2013	Oh it's on.	

=== Season 5 (2015–2016) ===
No.	Title	Upload date	Description	Notes
1	Gone Home	July 8, 2015	The Burchs discuss the merits of length vs quality vs lesbians.	
2	Dance Central 3	July 22, 2015	DCI agents Ashly & Anthony Burch walk the beat.	
3	Pokemon Unchained	August 5, 2015	Serve no Master Ball.	
4	Kerbal Space Program	August 19, 2015	Ash teaches Anthony how to land some moon.	
5	Animal Crossing: New Leaf	September 6, 2015	Requiem for a B.R.E.A.M.	
6	Cookie Clicker	September 16, 2015	Capitalism you can taste!	
7	NFL Blitz	October 1, 2015	The family takes some late hits.	
8	Ecco The Dolphin	October 23, 2015	Ash gets lost jogging down memory lane.	
9	Banjo-Kazooie	November 5, 2015	A rare role-reversal puzzles Anthony.	
10	Peachy	November 25, 2015	Ash goes on a soap box bender.	
11	Kirby Super Star	December 15, 2015	There are no winners in Megaton Punch.	
12	Christmas with the Burches	December 25, 2015	Ash helps Davis and Anthony spice up their holiday.	
13	Scale	January 20, 2016	A game about making things bigger or smaller.	
14	Mass Effect 3	February 5, 2016	A playthrough of the space opera's epic conclusion causes the family to reflect.	
15	Game of Thrones (Telltale)	June 14, 2016	Anthony once again gives into fan requests.	
16	Gravity Ghost	August 23, 2016	Erin regrets hiring Ash to voice the main character of her game.	
17	Hatoful Boyfriend	October 31, 2016	Ash puts her dating strats to the test.	
18	Chrono Trigger	December 31, 2016	Time heals all wounds.	

=== Specials (2013–2019) ===
Title	Upload date	Description	Notes
The Wind Waker	November 26, 2013	Link shows Beedle his wand.	Winner of Nintendo's WiiU Video Challenge.
The Hobbit: Kingdoms of Middle-Earth	January 6, 2014	Ash and Anthony play a game of throne. Just one.	Sponsored by Kabam Games as part of a promotional campaign.
Gorilla Wayfare	January 17, 2014	Ash debuts the latest in transportation technology.	Collaboration with Rocket Jump for winning the WiiU Video Challenge.
Local Multiplayer Etiquette	March 24, 2014	Ash teaches you the do's and don'ts of local multiplayer.	Created for Independent Games Festival 2014.
Making an Indie Game	March 24, 2014	Ash attempts to qualify for an IGF award.	Created for Independent Games Festival 2014
Tank Domination	June 3, 2014	#GETTUNKED	Sponsored by Game Insight as part of a promotional campaign.
Human Resources	October 14, 2014	The humans are safe for now.	Sponsored as part of a Kickstarter campaign.
SJW	March 4, 2015	SJW - Hey Ash Whatcha Playin'?	Created for Independent Games Festival 2015
This War of Mine	March 9, 2015	Ash scribbles on her cousin's psyche with a morally gray crayon.	Created for Independent Games Festival 2015
Schrödinger's Cat and the Raiders of the Lost Quark	June 2, 2015	Ash briefly contemplates quantum superposition.	Sponsored by Italic Pig as part of a promotional campaign.
Season 5 & Patreon	July 1, 2015	New Episodes every other week starting 7/8/15	Announcement of a fifth season.
Undertale (IGF)	March 23, 2016	The charming indie game sweeps the nation.	Created for Independent Games Festival 2015
2015 Emotional Challenge (IGF)	April 11, 2016		Created for Independent Games Festival 2015
GameStop	November 18, 2016		Sponsored by GameStop
Stardew Valley (IGF)	March 1, 2017		Created for Independent Games Festival 2017
Event[0] (IGF)	March 6, 2017		Created for Independent Games Festival 2017
Getting Over It with Bennett Foddy (IGF)	March 21, 2018		Created for Independent Games Festival 2018
Baba Is You (IGF)	March 21, 2018		Created for Independent Games Festival 2018
Game Analyst (GDC)	March 21, 2018		Created for 2018 Game Developers Choice Awards
It's-a-Me Official Trailer 1 (2018) - Super Mario Odyssey Movie	March 21, 2018		Created for 2018 Game Developers Choice Awards
GameStop After Dark	August 28, 2019	GameStop presents exclusive titles intended to titillate mature gamers.	Sponsored by GameStop
