= Borderlands (series) =

First-person shooter video game series

- Genres: Action role-playing, first-person shooter
- Developers: Gearbox Software; 2K Australia; Telltale Games; Gearbox Studio Québec
- Publishers: 2K; Telltale Games
- Platforms: PlayStation 3, Windows, Xbox 360, OS X, PlayStation Vita, iOS, Linux, Android, PlayStation 4, Xbox One, Stadia, Nintendo Switch, PlayStation 5, Xbox Series X/S, Nintendo Switch 2
- First release: Borderlands; October 20, 2009
- Latest release: Borderlands 4 September 12, 2025

Borderlands is an action role-playing first-person looter-shooter video game franchise set in a space Western science fantasy setting, created and produced by Gearbox Software and published by 2K for multiple platforms.

The main Borderlands game series consists of Borderlands (2009), Borderlands 2 (2012), Borderlands: The Pre-Sequel (2014), Borderlands 3 (2019), Tiny Tina's Wonderlands (2022) and Borderlands 4 (2025). Spin-off games include the episodic graphic adventure games Tales from the Borderlands (2014–2015) and New Tales from the Borderlands (2022). A film adaptation of the series was released on August 9, 2024.

The series has become a commercial success for its loot-driven multiplayer co-op gameplay and its sense of humor. As of November 2022, more than 77 million copies of Borderlands games had been shipped, with 26 million from Borderlands 2. An additional five million copies of Borderlands 3 were sold within five days of release, bringing the total series' net revenues to over US$1 billion. This makes it one of the best-selling video game franchises of all time.

== Gameplay ==
The Borderlands games are first-person loot shooters, set in an open world, with some role-playing video game (RPG) elements. Tales from the Borderlands and its sequel are episodic adventure games. The concept came from game designer Matthew Armstrong's idea to combine the mechanics of first-person shooters like Doom with role-playing games with randomized loot such as Diablo. After developing the mechanics of a shooter-RPG hybrid, Gearbox established the idea of players seeking Vaults on the planet Pandora, comparing the discovery of new loot to opening a Pandora's box.

Players select one of the characters, representing Vault Hunters that have traveled to the planet Pandora to try to seek its fabled Vault. Each Vault Hunter has a different skill tree and one or more unique abilities. Players complete quests and explore Pandora while dealing with the violent Pandora wildlife, crazed scavengers that have been stranded on the planet, and various military groups that attempt to stop them. Completing quests and defeating foes earns in-game money and experience, which is used for expanding the player's skill tree. If the player loses their health or falls into bottomless chasms, they respawn at the most recent checkpoint and lose some of their money. The games are divided into several maps, and once players have reached a waypoint station on the map, they can teleport to any other previously visited map. Otherwise, players must reach certain points on the edges of the map to move into a different area. Some maps allow the player to spawn an armed vehicle to help traverse large maps or to deal with more powerful enemies.

A core feature of Borderlands is the loot system, which generates a variety of guns (such as pistols, shotguns, assault rifles, sniper rifles, and rocket launchers), shield generators, grenade modifications, and class modifications. This equipment is randomly dropped by foes, found in containers around Pandora, or obtained as rewards for completing quests. The statistics of the equipment, such as the amount of damage and accuracy for a gun and special elemental attacks, are procedurally generated, and use a loot color-coding system to indicate rarity, ranging from white (most common), to purple and orange (most rare and powerful). The first Borderlands is credited by the Guinness Book of World Records to have over 17 million different possible guns that could be generated, while the latter games expand further on this. Other facets of the game use a similar procedural system: foes may have unique attributes and more powerful variants, such as creatures that can spit corrosive acid or flame, or scavengers with higher amounts of health and armor. Weapons and other equipment can be sold and bought at various vending machines scattered about the maps; nearly all vending machines include a rare piece of loot that is only available for a limited amount of in-game time, after which the machine's inventory is rotated for a new set of equipment. Borderlands 2, 3, and The Pre-Sequel! include the use of "SHIFT codes", which the player can obtain through social media or other promotions, and give players "golden keys" that can be used once to obtain an item of exceptional quality appropriate for the player's level; this feature was added to the remaster of Borderlands.

As the player levels, the loot drops will become more powerful; at the same time, the enemies that the player faces on the map will increase in level as well. All three games feature a New Game Plus-type replay mode, where they can start with the same character at the same level they completed the game with, and continue to level up the character through the replay up to a fixed level, making the game more difficult. All three games support co-operative play for up to four people; the difficulty of the enemies as well as the quality of the loot drops scales with the number of players.

In Borderlands 2 and in the Pre-Sequel, a "Badass Rank" system was added. By completing certain challenges, such as killing a number of enemies with a specific weapon type, the player would be awarded Badass points; for every 100 points, they can then redeem these for one of several small buffs to the player's attributes such as gun damage or shield capacity. Selecting the same buff repeatedly on redemption while using a given character would provide less beneficial rewards. However, these Badass buffs are shared by all characters that the player has so that if the player starts a new character, they will retain all the existing buffs, and new buffs when the points are redeemed will be more beneficial; the "Badass Rank" system has been replaced in Borderlands 3 by the "guardian" system.

All the games in the series use a comic book-like rendering approach, frequently mistaken as a cel-shaded technique. Instead, the games use fully realized hand-drawn textures and within the game engine, add noticeable outlines to create the appearance of a comic book setting.

== Synopsis ==
=== Setting ===
The games in Borderlands primarily take place on the planet Pandora. Pandora is believed to be rich with mineral wealth, leading several interstellar megacorporations to send colony ships there to capitalize on it, but once they arrive, they find little of value outside of undecipherable alien artifacts from a long-extinct race known as the Eridians, and numerous native lifeforms make it too dangerous to colonize. Many of the corporations abandon the planet, leaving behind their workforce, former prisoners coerced into employment, who take over much of the planet as bandits and raiders. However, a study of the alien artifacts leads to the discovery of mythical Eridian Vaults filled with untold treasure and wealth, which are guarded by extremely powerful and ancient monsters. Corporations and military forces return to the planet, along with a number of Vault Hunters who seek to find the Vaults themselves. The settings are expanded to include the moon of Elpis in Borderlands: The Pre-sequel, and other planets in Borderlands 3 where further Eridian Vaults have been found.

Gathering of Borderlands cosplayers.

=== Characters ===
Several characters appear in multiple Borderlands games. The small yellow robot Claptrap (voiced by David Eddings, with Jim Foronda in Borderlands 3) has appeared in all games as a non-player character (NPC) and in the Pre-Sequel as a playable character. The megalomaniacal CEO of the Hyperion Corporation, Handsome Jack (Dameon Clarke), is first encountered as the principal antagonist of Borderlands 2, while the Pre-Sequel features him as an NPC whose rise to power is assisted by the player. After his death at the end of Borderlands 2, Jack reappears in Tales from the Borderlands as an AI personality and in flashbacks in Borderlands 3. The enigmatic "Angel" (voiced by Jennifer Green, portrayed in the video by Brittani Johnson) who guides the players through Borderlands is, in the sequel, revealed to be Jack's daughter.

Also appearing across multiple games are several NPCs who act as vendors and quest-givers for the player. They include the erratic researcher Patricia Tannis (Colleen Clinkenbeard), the garage owner and mechanic Scooter (Michael Neumann), Scooter's younger sister and mechanic Ellie (Jamie Marchi), the bartender Mad Moxxi (Brina Palencia), the 13-year-old demolitions expert Tiny Tina (Ashly Burch), (Note: Anthony Burch, a writer for Gearbox and Ashly Burch's brother, wrote the role for Tina with Ashly in mind, leading her to get the role.) the gun company founder Mr. Torgue (Chris Rager), the gentleman hunter Sir Alistair Hammerlock (J. Michael Tatum), the junk dealer Janey Springs (Catherine Moore), the shady surgeon Dr. Zed (Ric Spiegel) and the gun merchant Marcus Kincaid (Bruce DuBose), who also narrates the opening cinematics.

In each main game, the player chooses one of several player characters – "Vault Hunters" drawn to Pandora by the prospect of the alien riches contained within the Vaults – but as the games support up to four-player co-op gameplay, their continuity presents these characters as having witnessed the events of each game together. Several of these player characters appear as non-player characters in later games.

- The player characters of the first Borderlands are Roland (voiced by Oliver Tull in Borderlands and Markus Lloyd in Borderlands 2), a stoic soldier; Lilith (Colleen Clinkenbeard), a "Siren" with magical powers; Mordecai (voiced by Julio Cedillo in Borderlands and Jason Liebrecht in subsequent games), a sniper with a pet bird of prey; and Brick (Marcus Mauldin), a strongman brawler.
- The Vault Hunters of Borderlands 2 are Axton (Robert McCollum), a renegade soldier; Maya (Martha Harms), another Siren; Salvador (John Swasey), a short-statured and short-tempered "gunzerker"; and Zer0 (Michael Turner), an enigmatic masked assassin. DLC introduced two more player characters: Gaige (Cherami Leigh), the "Mechromancer", a girl with a flying killer robot, and Krieg (Jason Douglas), a deranged wanderer with a split personality.
- All but two of the player characters of the Pre-Sequel appeared in earlier games as NPCs. Claptrap is a robot that appears throughout the series. Athena (Lydia Mackay) is a renegade assassin encountered in a DLC campaign in Borderlands. Nisha Kadam (Stephanie Young), a bounty hunter and eventually Jack's girlfriend, goes on to be killed by the players in Borderlands 2 – as does Wilhelm (Bryan Massey), a cyborg mercenary obsessed with transhumanism. The other two player characters of the Pre-Sequel, available through DLC, are Timothy (Dameon Clarke), a body double of Handsome Jack, and Lady Aurelia Hammerlock (Kenneisha Thompson), Alistair's sister and big game hunter.
- Borderlands 3, set years after Tales from the Borderlands, features four new Vault Hunter protagonists: Amara (Zehra Fazal), a Siren; Moze (Marissa Lenti), a rogue Vladof soldier who pilots the mecha Iron Bear; Zane (Cian Berry), a black ops operative with a variety of gadgets; and FL4K (Sung-Won Cho), a robot beastmaster. The antagonists are the Calypso Twins, Tyreen and Troy Calypso (Elisa Melendez and Max Mittelman), who are both Sirens.
- In Borderlands 4, the playable Vault Hunters are the goth Siren Vex (Judy Alice Lee), the cheery scientist Harlowe (Kimberly Brooks), the exosuited soldier Rafa (Alejandro Saab) and the axe-wielding warrior Amon (Ray Chase). DLC introduced two more player characters: mercenary robot C4SH (John Eric Bentley), and hacker-turned-assassin Loveless (Carin Gilfry). Their antagonist is the Timekeeper (Dave Fennoy), a dictator ruling the planet Kairos.

=== Plot ===
Shortly after the Dahl corporation leaves the planet Pandora at the start of Borderlands, four Vault Hunters arrive to seek out the Vault – Roland, Lilith, Mordecai, and Brick. They are guided by a mysterious entity, the Guardian Angel, that lives within the planet's communication EchoNet system, to collect pieces of the Vault Key, but warned that the Vault can only be accessed every 200 years, and that time is approaching, urging them onward. They complete the Key, but come into conflict with soldiers of the Atlas corporation who return to claim Pandora and the Vault. The Vault Hunters fight Atlas back and locate the Vault, but upon opening, it releases a giant monster, named the "Destroyer". They fight the monster and push it back into the Vault, which closes, leaving Pandora safe.

In the Pre-Sequel, Jack, a low-level programmer for Hyperion, discovers another Vault on Pandora's moon, Elpis, and hires six more Vault Hunters – Wilhelm, Athena, Claptrap, Nisha, Timothy, and Aurelia – to seek it in the wake of the First Vault's closure. With the Vault Hunters' help, Jack is able to seize control of Helios, the Hyperion space station in orbit between Pandora and Elpis, and uses its resources to secure the Vault with the help of the Hunters. Inside, there is only a strange artifact in the shape of the Vault symbol, but when Jack touches it, he experiences visions of the imminent release of the "Warrior". Jack starts to go mad with power, and Lilith punches the artifact into his face, disfiguring him forever. Jack assumes his mask, becoming Handsome Jack, and takes over Hyperion as he swears vengeance on the Vault Hunters.

In Borderlands 2, six new Vault Hunters have arrived to find a new Vault that has been discovered on Pandora, but Handsome Jack uses his vast array of Hyperion resources to try to stop them. The new Hunters – Axton, Maya, Salvador, Zer0, Gaige, and Krieg – are aided by Roland and his former Vault Hunters, now leading a resistance known as the Crimson Raiders, secured in their base Sanctuary, and further guided by the Guardian Angel, who is revealed to be Jack's Siren daughter, dying from excessive usage of her powers. Jack had used Angel to trick the former Vault Hunters into opening the Vault on Pandora to gain access to Eridium, a special alien mineral with untold properties. After The Vault Hunters kill Angel in an act of mercy and to disrupt Jack's plan, Jack appears in Angel's chamber and proceeds to kill Roland. Lilith teleports The Vault Hunters to safety before being captured by Jack and used to finish charging the Vault Key. While they find the Vault, Jack arrives and joins them as they open it, and he summons forth the gigantic Warrior, which he wants to use to control Pandora and beyond. The Vault Hunters defeat the Warrior and leave Jack to his death before discovering that the Vault Key contains a map leading to Vaults across the galaxy.

Sometime after these events, in Tales of the Borderlands, the absence of Jack's control leaves a power void on both Pandora and Hyperion. A Hyperion lackey, Rhys, and a con artist Fiona get caught up in events over the sale of a fake Vault Key to Rhys's superior. They discover that there is another vault, the Vault of the Traveler, controlled by an Atlas prototype robot named Gortys. As they collect the scattered parts of Gortys, Rhys inadvertently downloads an AI copy of Handsome Jack's personality into his cybernetic mind. Rhys and Fiona's group makes to Helios in a makeshift spacecraft, and Scooter sacrifices himself to assure they get there. Once back on Helios, Jack takes over the entire station. Rhys and Fiona stop Jack and cause the station to crash into Pandora, wiping out Jack's personality for good. After going their separate ways for a while, they reunite to help defeat the Traveler, another giant Vault monster, freeing Gortys and leaving the Vault to be explored.

Borderlands 3 follows 7 years after the events of Borderlands 2 and Tales. After being forced to destroy Sanctuary to protect Pandora from a doomsday plot by former Dahl commander, Colonel Hector, Lilith and the Crimson Raiders recover the Vault Key/Map to discover the many Vaults that exist across the galaxy, and travel among planets via their new spacecraft Sanctuary III. However, the Calypso Twins, Tyreen and Troy, have declared themselves the rightful owners of the Vaults, creating a cult of personality, the Children of the Vault, from the remnant bandit factions of Pandora to secure these Vaults themselves, and making a strategic partnership with megacorporation Maliwan for military support. Lilith recruits new Vault Hunters – Zane, Amara, FL4K, and Moze – to help secure these Vaults before Tyreen and Troy can. They learn that the pair are Sirens and that they seek to absorb the power of the Vault monsters to open the "Great Vault", revealed to be the planet Pandora itself, unaware that it still contains the "Destroyer", which is further explained to be a being intent on destroying the universe. With the help of former and new allies, the Crimson Raiders manage to stop the Calypso Twins and kill the Destroyer but at the cost of Maya and Lilith's lives, although the latter's fate is ambiguous.

Borderlands 4 happens 6 years after the third game, where the planet Kairos, which has been disrupted ever since Elpis was transported to its orbit by Lilith (who turns out to still be alive, but trapped in the Phase from which Sirens draw their powers), attracts a new generation of Vault Hunters, who along with trying to find another Vault have to face the planet's dictator, The Timekeeper.

== Main series ==
Release timeline
2009	Borderlands
2010–2011
2012	Borderlands 2
2012	Borderlands Legends
2013	Borderlands 2: Tiny Tina's Assault on Dragon Keep
2014	Borderlands: The Pre-Sequel
2014	Tales from the Borderlands
2015–2018
2019	Borderlands 3
2020–2021
2022	Tiny Tina's Wonderlands
2022	New Tales from the Borderlands
2023–2024
2025	Borderlands 4

=== Borderlands ===
Borderlands was released in 2009, and combines traditional first-person shooter gameplay with character-building elements found in role-playing games, leading Gearbox to call the game a "role-playing shooter". Players choose to play as one of four characters: Lilith the Siren, Mordecai the Hunter, Brick the Berserker, and Roland the Soldier. The game awards experience points for enemies killed and objectives completed, as well as encouraging skillful gameplay by granting bonuses to more difficult actions such as headshots. Earned experience builds toward the threshold of the next level. Leveling up provides the player with additional "skill points", which are used to select various skills that allow character specialization.

In addition to various melee weaponry, the character can wield an array of firearms, grenades, and specialized weaponry, which are procedurally generated to provide a rich variety of loot. The game supports solo play as well as a cooperative mode for up to four players. A New Game Plus mode allows players to replay the game with the same character at a higher difficulty level.

The game is set on the planet Pandora, contested by bandits, mercenaries of interstellar corporations, dangerous wildlife and, eventually, eldritch alien abominations. As a "Vault Hunter", guided by the mysterious "Guardian Angel", the player is searching for a fabled vault full of alien loot. Borderlands is characterized by its offbeat humor and a cartoonish, cel-shaded art style.

About 4.5 million copies of the game had been sold worldwide by 2011, an unexpected success for Gearbox. Borderlands received positive reviews, with an aggregate Metacritic score of 81 to 86, depending on the platform. It was complemented by four DLC packs: The Zombie Island of Dr. Ned, Mad Moxxi's Underdome Riot, The Secret Armory of General Knoxx, and Claptrap's New Robot Revolution.

A remastered version for PC, PlayStation 4 and Xbox One – Borderlands: Game of the Year Edition – was released on April 3, 2019. It was released for Nintendo Switch version, which released on May 29, 2020.

=== Borderlands 2 ===
The sequel to Borderlands, released in 2012, picked up the setting and gameplay mechanics of its predecessor. Again, players control one of four (or, with DLC, six) Vault Hunters, while the four-player characters of the original game re-appear as non-player characters. The story, written by Anthony Burch, focuses on the players' struggle with Handsome Jack, the megalomaniacal CEO of the Hyperion corporation, who seeks control of Pandora's mineral riches and alien artifacts.

Gearbox released five DLC campaigns that continue the main game's story (Captain Scarlett and Her Pirate's Booty, Mr. Torgue's Campaign of Carnage, Sir Hammerlock's Big Game Hunt, Tiny Tina's Assault on Dragon Keep and Commander Lilith & the Fight for Sanctuary). In addition, several DLC packs introducing two new player characters (Gaige the Mechromancer and Krieg the Psycho), more character development possibilities and quests have been released.

Even more so than the first game, Borderlands 2 was an unexpected critical and commercial success. It was one of the best-selling games of 2012, and has become the best-selling game in the history of its publisher 2K Games, with 8.5 million copies sold by February 2014. The game received aggregate Metacritic scores of 89 to 91, depending on the platform.

A port of Borderlands 2 for the PlayStation Vita handheld was released in 2014, offering the full game and some of its DLC, but limited to two-person multiplayer.

=== Borderlands: The Pre-Sequel ===
Announced in April 2014, Borderlands: The Pre-Sequel was developed by 2K Australia and released for PS3, Xbox 360 and Windows PC in October 2014, as well as for Mac OS later in 2014. It is set on Elpis, the moon of Pandora, and its story – occurring between the events of the first two games – covers the rise of Handsome Jack to power. The game features four of Jack's henchmen as playable characters: Athena the Gladiator, Wilhelm the Enforcer, Nisha the Lawbringer and the robot Claptrap, "the Fragtrap". Jack's body double Timothy Lawrence and Sir Hammerlock's sister Aurelia were added later as DLC player characters. New game mechanics include the use of oxygen tanks and a boost jump.

The game was re-released in 2015 as part of Borderlands: The Handsome Collection, a compilation and port of Borderlands 2 and The Pre-Sequel! for PlayStation 4 and Xbox One.

=== Borderlands 3 ===
Borderlands 3 was released on September 13, 2019, for Windows, PlayStation 4 and Xbox One. The game had been in development at Gearbox as early as 2015, and was revealed at PAX East on March 28, 2019. Borderlands 3 was the best selling game in the series, selling over five million copies within the first five days of its release, and reaching 8 million by the end of 2019.

As with past games, players select one of four new Vault Hunters – Amara the Siren, Moze the Gunner, Zane the Operative and FL4K the Beastmaster – as they try to stop the Calypso Twins from acquiring the greatest power in the universe, including on planets other than Pandora.

=== Borderlands 4 ===
Borderlands 4 was released on September 12 2025 for PlayStation 5, Xbox Series X and Series S, Windows and was scheduled for the Nintendo Switch 2 on October 3 2025. Borderlands 4 sold 2.5 million copies by September 22, 2025. The game features 4 playable vault hunters: Vex the Phase Siren, Rafa the Exo-Soldier, Amon the Forgeknight, and Harlowe the Gravitar. Borderlands 4 is the series's first "seamless" open world, with no loading screens. The game takes place on a new planet, Kairos.

== Spin-off games ==
=== Borderlands Legends ===
To coincide with the release of Borderlands 2, the iOS spin-off game Borderlands Legends was released on October 31, 2012, for iOS devices. It is more of a strategy game than a role-playing video game and is played from a top-down perspective with players controlling all four Vault hunters from Borderlands.

=== Tales from the Borderlands ===
Tales from the Borderlands is a more narrative- and character-driven, episodic game developed by Telltale Games with collaboration from Gearbox Software, featuring returning and new characters from the Borderlands games. Its five episodes were published between November 2014 to October 2015 for multiple platforms.

The game follows two protagonists, the con artist Fiona and the Hyperion company man Rhys, as they somewhat questionably recount the plot of the game. Telltale Games aimed to incorporate two characteristics of the Borderlands series, gunplay and offbeat humor, into Tales from the Borderlands.

=== Borderlands Online ===
Borderlands Online was to be a China-exclusive online MMO shooter game for PC and mobile devices, developed by 2K China and Gearbox Software, and published and operated by Shanda Games. It was slated to be released in 2015, but was cancelled in November 2015 when 2K China was closed because of profitability concerns. In 2026, a fan project made a playable development version of the game available, translated into English and called "BLOL".

=== Tiny Tina's Wonderlands ===
Tiny Tina's Wonderlands is a standalone game based on the Borderlands universe, but taking place in a high-fantasy setting, shortly after the events of Tiny Tina's Assault on Dragon Keep DLC for Borderlands 2. Like Borderlands, Wonderlands supports four-player cooperative combat using procedurally-generated weapons and loot, though with additional focus on magic and melee weapons in addition to guns. According to Gearbox's CEO Randy Pitchford, the game's concept had been in development for more than ten years. In addition to Ashly Burch voicing Tiny Tina, it includes voice work from Andy Samberg as Captain Valentine, Wanda Sykes as Frette the robot, and Will Arnett as the Dragon Lord. The game released on March 25, 2022, on Microsoft Windows, PlayStation 4 and 5, and Xbox One and Series X/S.

Ahead of Wonderlands's release, Gearbox released the Assault on Dragon Keep as a standalone game, Tiny Tina's Assault on Dragon Keep: A Wonderlands One-Shot Adventure, on November 9, 2021, for Windows, PlayStation 4, and Xbox One.

=== New Tales from the Borderlands ===
A successor to Tales from the Borderlands, New Tales from the Borderlands introduces three new playable characters: Anu, an altruistic scientist, Octavio, Anu's brother who is seeking fame and fortune, and Fran, the owner of a frozen yogurt store who uses a hoverchair for mobility. The trio must also work together as they seek a vault key which may grant them access to a vault stashed with treasures, while fighting against Tediore, a weapon manufacturer who has invaded Promethea, the home planet of the three protagonists. The game was released on October 21, 2022 for PC, PlayStation 4, PlayStation 5, Xbox One, Xbox Series X and Series S, and Nintendo Switch.

=== Borderlands: Vault Hunter Pinball ===
A virtual pinball adaptation based on the Borderlands series developed by Zen Studios as one of three pinball tables based on games developed by Gearbox Software, appeared as downloadable content for Pinball FX released for PlayStation 4, PlayStation 5, Xbox One and Xbox Series X/S in February 2023 and Windows in April 2023.

=== Borderlands Mobile ===
A mobile game was released as a limited test-run from April 9th to 28th, 2026; another test-run ran from September 3rd to October 26th, 2026.

== Compilations ==
=== Borderlands: The Handsome Collection ===
Borderlands: The Handsome Collection includes Borderlands 2 and Borderlands the Pre-Sequel for release on PlayStation 4 and Xbox One, as well as on Microsoft Windows and macOS, in March 2015. Both games were remastered by Iron Galaxy Studios and Armature Studio respectively to support the newer consoles and include support for importing saves from either original game into the Collection to continue those characters. It was later released for Nintendo Switch as well.

=== Borderlands Legendary Collection ===
Borderlands Legendary Collection includes Borderlands, Borderlands 2, and Borderlands the Pre-Sequel for the Nintendo Switch, it was released in May 2020.

=== Borderlands Collection: Pandora's Box ===
Borderlands Collection: Pandora's Box is a digital compilation of all games up until 2023 but Tiny Tina's Wonderlands, along with their downloadable content, released on August 23, 2023 on the Steam, PlayStation and Xbox storefronts, and on July 25, 2024 on the Nintendo eShop for the Switch.

== Other media ==
=== Soundtracks ===
The soundtrack for Borderlands, written by Jesper Kyd, Raison Varner, Cris Velasco and Sascha Dikiciyan (Sonic Mayhem), was published as Borderlands: Original Soundtrack in 2009, featuring 27 tracks.

The soundtrack for the sequel, by the same composers, was published as Borderlands 2: Original Soundtrack in 2012, featuring 23 tracks. Soundtrack albums for several DLC campaigns were released separately.

=== Mobile app ===
LootTheWorld was a free mobile app available for iOS and Android released on December 12, 2013, and shut down on October 18, 2015. The app allowed users to scan barcodes and QR codes which unlocked items for Borderlands 2 that could be transferred to the users game through their ShiFT account. The app was only available in the United States.

=== Comic series ===
A four-issues comics miniseries, Borderlands: Origins, were published in print and digitally in November 2012. The series was written by Mikey Neumann and the artist Agustin Padilla, published by IDW. It tells the story of how the original four Vault Hunters came to be together at the beginning of Borderlands, filling in their backstory and setting up the events of both games. Those are the titles:

- Borderlands: Origins Roland
- Borderlands: Origins Lilith
- Borderlands: Origins Mordecai
- Borderlands: Origins Brick
- Borderlands: Origins Collected Edition

A second series, Borderlands: Fall of Fyrestone, also by Neumann and Padilla, was published in eight issues between July 2014 and April 2015. It followed the events of the first Borderlands game.

- Borderlands: Fall of Fyrestone #1 (July 2014)
- Borderlands: Fall of Fyrestone #2 (August 2014)
- Borderlands: Fall of Fyrestone #3 (October 2014)
- Borderlands: Fall of Fyrestone #4 (November 2014)
- Borderlands: Fall of Fyrestone #5 Tannis & The Vault Part 1 (December 2014)
- Borderlands: Fall of Fyrestone #6 Tannis & The Vault Part 2 (January 2015)
- Borderlands: Fall of Fyrestone #7 Tannis & The Vault Part 3 (March 2015)
- Borderlands: Fall of Fyrestone #8 Tannis & The Vault Part 4 (April 2015)

A video game art book, The Art of Borderlands 2, is available.

=== Novels ===
Pocket Books published three Borderlands novels by John Shirley, covering Roland and Mordecai's origins and their adventures after the events of Borderlands:

- Borderlands: The Fallen (November 22, 2011), ISBN 978-1439198476
- Borderlands: Unconquered (September 25, 2012), ISBN 978-1439198483
- Borderlands: Gunsight (October 1, 2013), ISBN 978-1439198490

Borderlands: Debt or Alive (ISBN 978-1803363530), a novel by Borderlands 2 writer Anthony Burch based on Tales from the Borderlands, was published in June 2024 by Titan Books.

=== Card game ===
Alongside the reveal of Borderlands 3, Gearbox presented a card game called Borderlands: Tiny Tina's Robot Tea Party. Designed for two to five players and taking 15 minutes a game, the goal is to collect the necessary cards to assemble a specific Claptrap model, but which can be waylaid by action cards played by other players. The game is published by Gearbox, XYZ Game Labs, and Nerdvana Games.

=== Film ===
A film adaptation of Borderlands was developed starting 2015 as a tentpole movie by Lionsgate, with Avi Arad producing with Erik Feig. Gearbox CEO Randy Pitchford and Take-Two Interactive's CEO Strauss Zelnick served as executive producers. Eli Roth directed the film, from a screenplay he co-wrote with Craig Mazin. The film stars Cate Blanchett and Kevin Hart in the lead roles as Lilith and Roland, and also includes Jamie Lee Curtis, Jack Black, Ariana Greenblatt, Florian Munteanu, Haley Bennett, Edgar Ramirez, Olivier Richters, and Janina Gavankar. The film was released on August 9, 2024, to mostly negative reviews.

=== Audio drama ===
In 2026, Gearbox started a scripted narrative podcast, Borderlands: Dead ECHOs, written by and starring Joel Watson and April Johnson, portraying Watts, a disenchanted DAHL ECHO Operator who supplements his pay selling lucrative secrets taken from ECHO logs, and Junie, who joins his criminal enterprise.
