= Parbati River =

Parbati River may refer to:

- Parbati River (Himachal Pradesh), India
- Parbati River (Madhya Pradesh), India
- Parbati River (Rajasthan), India
