= Parvati Kumari =

Indian classical singer

- Genres: Ghazal; Qawwali
- Occupation: Singer

Parvati Kumari is an Indian classical singer associated with sufi music.

== Early life ==
Parvati Kumari completed her Sangeet Visharad from Gandharva Mahavidyalaya and earned a Bachelor of Arts degree in music from University of Delhi.

== Career ==
Parvati Kumari was associated with Saregama India and released her debut album Barse Barse Naina.
