= Parvathi Nayar =

Indian artist (born 1964)

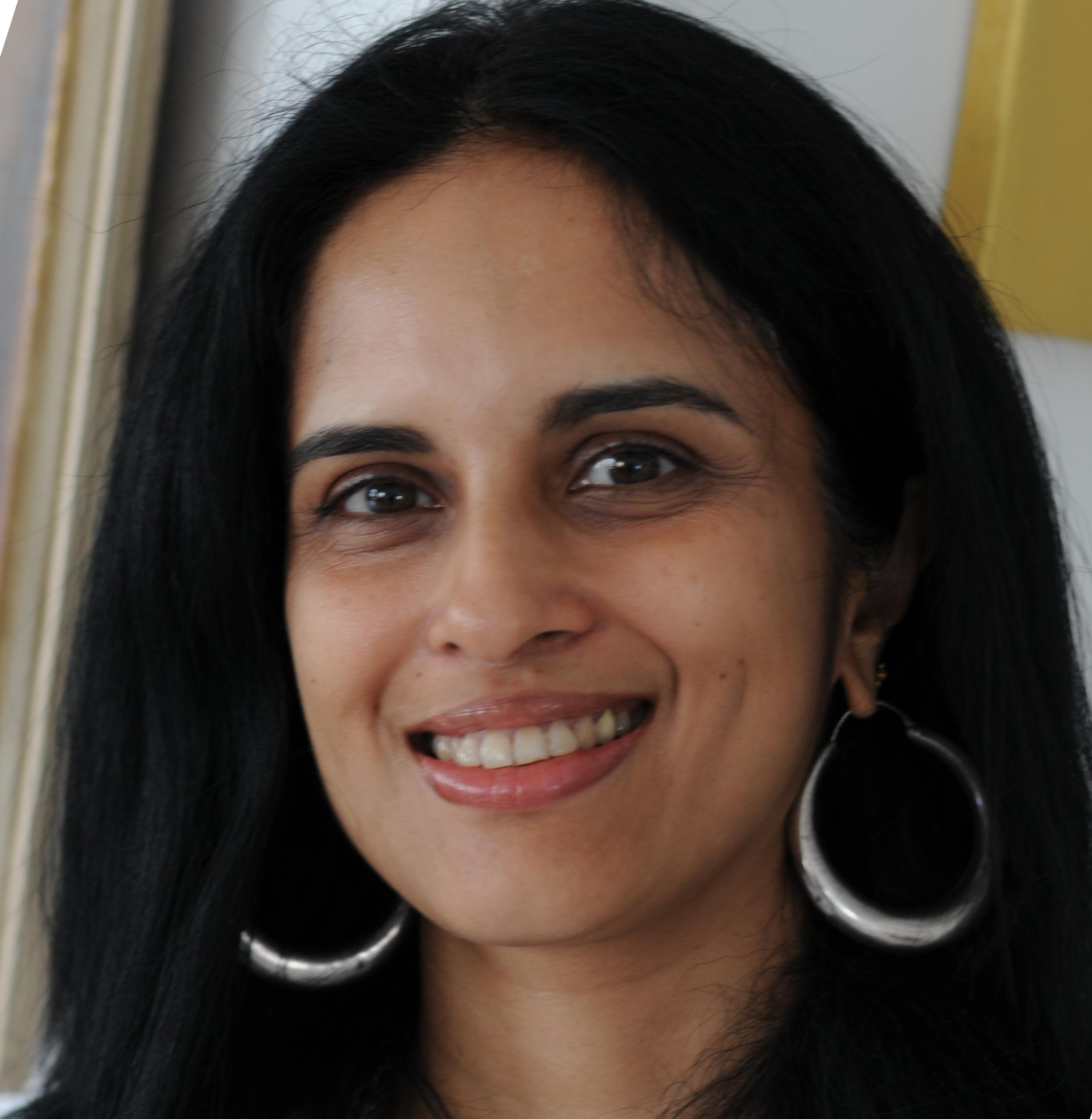
- Born: 24 March 1964 (age 62); New Delhi, India
- Education: Central St Martins College of Art and Design
- Known for: Contemporary Art, Drawings, Videos
- Notable work: A Story of Flight, Jai He public art project, T2 Terminal Mumbai Airport The Fluidity of Horizons Kochi Muziris Biennale
- Website: www.parvathinayar.com

Parvathi Nayar is a New Delhi born visual artist and creative writer. She is best known for her creative videos, sculptures, paintings, bookmaking and photography. She was one of 70 artists selected to be part of B70, the historical 70th anniversary birthday show of Amitabh Bachchan. One of her works, a 20-foot-high drawn sculpture artwork, was installed at New Mumbai airport on the opening day ceremony in 2014. Her work has also been collected by Singapore Art Museum, Sotheby's Institute of Art, The Australia India Institute and Deutsche Bank.

== Education ==
2004 MA Fine Art, Central Saint Martins College of Art and Design, London on a Chevening Scholarship from the British government 1985 BA Fine Art (Distinction), Stella Maris College, University of Madras, Madras. She was ranked first in the University, Best Outgoing Student, Dept Of Fine Arts, Matriculation (Second State Rank, Tamil Nadu) & Plus2, Good Shepherd Convent, Chennai

== Work ==
Parvathi’s work examines the narratives of spatial relationships, both the internal/intimate spaces, and the external/public, and often through the prism of science and technology. She often uses science as a medium to explain and explore world through unusual microscopic and macroscopic perspectives. Jai He Public Art Project Her 20-foot-high drawn-sculptural artwork was commissioned and installed as part of the public art project Jai He at the new Mumbai airport that opened in 2014 The Seeds of Things/The Nature of Things The hand-drawn graphite drawing The Seeds of Things (90 x 63 x 2 inches) and its companion video The Nature of Things (duration 6 mins, 34 secs) was created for the show To Let The World In curated by Dr Chaitanya Sambrani, Art Chennai, Lalit Kala Akademi, 2012. The Ambiguity of Landscapes Solo show of drawings, videos, artist book, animation and photography curated by Annapurna Garimella at Gallery Veda, Chennai, India Kochi Muziris Biennale 2014/15 Parvathi was invited to the Kochi-Muziris Biennale 2014/15 curated by Jitish Kallat for which she created an installation of drawings and sound titled "The Fluidity of Horizons". . Parvathy was also the "TEDx Chennai Speaker" for the event held on 23 October 2016 at Chennai.

=== List of selected exhibitions ===
Year	Title
Solos
2014	"The Ambiguity of Landscapes" curated by Annapurna Garimella, Gallery Veda, Chennai, India
2008	"I Sing the Body Electric", Bombay Art Gallery, Mumbai, India
2007	"Win Lose Draw", commissioned by ARTSingapore, Singapore
2006	"Innerscapes", curated by Caroline Bannerjee, Song of India, Singapore
2006	"drawing is a verb: an installation", curated by Phan Ming Yen, The Arts House, Singapore
1998	"Journey", Kinara, Jakarta, Indonesia
1997	"Flowers, Faces, Feelings", Jakarta, Indonesia
1996	"the art of a woman", the Koi Gallery, Jakarta, Indonesia
1994	"Woman and the Elements", Temasek Polytechnic, Singapore
