= Anthony Burch =

American author and podcaster

- Anthony Burch at the 2010 Game Developers Conference
- Occupations: Writer, podcaster
- Relatives: Ashly Burch (sister)
- Website: www.anthonyburch.pizza

Anthony Burch is an American writer. He is best known for his work as lead writer on Borderlands 2, his role as the Dungeon Master in the actual-play comedy podcast Dungeons & Daddies, and his role in Hey Ash, Whatcha Playin'? alongside his sister, Ashly Burch. In 2015, Burch was listed as one of Forbes 30 Under 30 in games and apps.

== Career ==
=== Hey Ash, Whatcha Playin'? ===
Burch initially wanted to make a documentary about video games. He bought a camera and he and his sister began making comedic sketches. This gained popularity, leading to the Hey Ash, Whatcha Playin'? web series. He and his sister wrote and starred in the series together.

=== Borderlands ===
In order to address feedback from the first installment in the franchise, Gearbox Software recruited Burch as the lead writer for the story of the game and its downloadable content. The game was nominated for writing awards including Best DLC at the Spike Video Game Awards 2012, Best Writing in a Comedy at NAVGTR, and Outstanding Achievement in Character at the 16th Annual D.I.C.E. Awards.

Burch continued as lead writer for the third game in the franchise, Borderlands: The Pre-Sequel.

=== Dungeons & Daddies ===
Burch played the role of Dungeon Master for season's 1, 2, and 4 of the actual play podcast Dungeons & Daddies. In season three, he played the role of Francis Farnsworth. At the 2019 AudioVerse Awards, Dungeons & Daddies won the award for "New Improvised Production", and Anthony Burch won the award for "Player Direction of a New Production".
