= Parvati Holcomb =

Video game character from the Outer Worlds

- The Outer Worlds character
- Parvati Holcomb in The Outer Worlds
- First appearance: The Outer Worlds (2019)
- Created by: Chris L'Etoile (concept); Kate Dollarhyde
- Voiced by: Ashly Burch

Parvati Holcomb is a character in the 2019 video game The Outer Worlds. She is one of the companion characters that can accompany the player-character, recruited on the first planet as an engineer for their spaceship. She is romantically attracted to the character Junlei Tennyson, though she grapples with her asexuality and anxieties around pursuing Junlei, with the player-character being able to help her work through her issues. She was initially conceived by Chris L'Etoile for Obsidian Entertainment before duties were taken over by Kate Dollarhyde. She is voiced by Ashly Burch, who was chosen for the role after she auditioned and was picked by Dollarhyde for how well she evoked the character. She was originally designed to be asexual by L'Etoile, while Dollarhyde expanded upon this with her own experiences as an asexual person.

Parvati is considered a standout character in The Outer Worlds, identified as one of the best characters of the 2010s by Polygon due to her personality, quest involving Junlei, and Burch's performance. The depiction of her sexuality was also praised by critics, both in terms of her asexuality and homosexuality. Multiple critics identified her as one of the most important characters as far as LGBTQ+ representation, with one critic stating that she sees themselves in Parvati due to her asexuality and queer romance, and another feeling she is one of the most important video game characters because of these elements.

== Concept and creation ==
Parvati Holcomb was conceived by writer Chris L'Etoile for the 2019 role-playing game The Outer Worlds, created by Obsidian Entertainment, who later left development of the game. She is an Indian engineer who wears goggles and overalls, and is one of the companions that can join the player in their quest in The Outer Worlds. He drew inspiration from the character Kaylee Frye from the television series Firefly, and was also the favorite character of the Obsidian staff due to her being "so likeable" and having a "very strong moral center." He aimed for her to be an "empathetic moral center" for the main cast, and wrote her to be "a little more naive, but very sweet" and caring. When L'Etoile left the project, the duties for designing her were given to narrative designer Kate Dollarhyde, who was given a "very long concept" document with an unusual amount of detail in it, including dialogue for her. In an interview with Vice, Dollarhyde stated it was unusual for the project to have this much information for a character, as well as to have multiple writers be in charge of a companion for the game. Other people involved in the creation of Parvati include concept artist Hannah Kennedy who helped design her model, and quality assurance tester Ariana Tavantzis who provided "a lot of" feedback. Senior narrative designer Megan Starks noted Parvati's personality as a contrast against another compansion, Ellie; where Parvati wants to help people, Ellie is more selfish.

Parvati is asexual, a detail given to her by L'Etoile. Dollarhyde, who is also asexual, gave Parvati a more "personal voice", and described feeling "lucky" that she was able to "inherit" the writing duties for this character. One line in particular, where Parvati talks about how others treat her as a robot, mirrored Dollarhyde's own personal experiences. Dollarhyde put herself into the writing by making Parvati similarly apprehensive about speaking to the person she likes. When writing the romantic elements of Parvati's story, Dollarhyde approached this with the perspective of a friend giving advice and "facilitating good experiences" to those they care about. The details of Dollarhyde's sexuality became more widely known as a result of interviews due to Parvati (and by extension Dollarhyde's) popularity, which she outed herself during. When Parvati reveals her asexuality to the player, Dollarhyde intentionally excluded dialogue options to behave bigoted towards the character, so players who related to Parvati would not have the "rug [pulled] out from under them." Parvati was chosen as the first companion in the game in order for her to be the "voice of surprise and delight and horror" for the player as they both see what the world is like, neither being very familiar with it.

Parvati is voiced by Ashly Burch, who gives her a southern drawl. Burch was given the role years after the character was first conceived, and as such, Dollarhyde had to work with either no spoken dialogue or dialogue spoken by a speech synthesizer while writing, which she found to be an obstacle due to not being able to properly hear her writing out loud by a person. When casting began, Dollarhyde was shown an audition for Parvati by Burch, and felt she fit how she imagined Parvati to sound. When discussing what she saw in Parvati, Burch explained that it was her ability to find "beauty and wonder in a bleak world" that stood out to her.

== Appearances ==
Parvati appears in 2019's The Outer Worlds. She is first met by the player-character in the town of Edgewater, where she is found speaking to the mayor Reed Tobson. He tasks the player-character with shutting down the power to stop striking workers and bringing them back to work for him, and the player can choose to bring Parvati with them. Once they make it to the rerouting terminal, they can either reroute the power to Edgewater or to the workers, depriving the other in the process. After this quest, Parvati will ask to join the crew, and if accepted, will take on the role of engineer on the player's spaceship. As the story progresses, the player can learn more about her, including her asexuality and romantic interest in the character Junlei Tennyson, whom the player can help Parvati pursue. Parvati struggles with her asexuality and other insecurities, and the player can help her overcome them and confess to Junlei. If done, Junlei reciprocates Parvati's feelings and goes on a date with her, which goes well, and they become romantic partners. Otherwise, Parvati can accompany the player on various missions throughout the game. She also appears as an available companion in two of The Outer Worlds' downloadable content campaigns, Peril on Gorgon and Murder on Eridanos.

== Critical reception ==
Parvati has received generally positive reception and has been described as a fan favorite, with Dollarhyde receiving an outpouring of support for her work on Parvati. Voice actress Ashly Burch was surprised by how popular Parvati was, though added in retrospect she felt it made sense, since Parvati represented groups of people rarely addressed in media, and was pleased that so many liked her. She was ranked among the best video game characters of the 2010s by Polygon staff, with Charlie Hall praising her "painfully genuine" personality, her quest line, and Burch's performance. Hirun Cryer of USgamer considered her definitively the best character in the game due to her personality and independence, saying that Parvati is what got him into the game. GamesRadar+ writer Heather Wald expressed disappointment that she could not romance Parvati, citing her "caring personality" and awkwardness as the qualities that attracted her to her. However, she eventually grew to appreciate her status as a "friend and supporter" of Parvati in her own romantic pursuits.

Parvati's sexuality has led to her being well-received, both by players and critics, with Peter Morics of Screen Rant called her a "champion for marginalized players" due to her asexuality. He felt it was rare to see a character who is both asexual and bisexual, and praised the game for how it never portrays her sexuality as "strange" or a "big twist." Patrick Klepek for Vice regarded her as the standout character in The Outer Worlds and one of the best of 2019, noting her fan following derived from her sexuality. He also praised her writer and voice actor for helping make her feel "real." Gita Jackson of Kotaku described her story as an "examination" of both the difficulties for certain people to fit into society as well as a "touching queer love story." The Gamer's editor in chief Stacey Henley regarded her as "one of gaming's most important characters," praising her romantic pursuit for being well-written and for examining her anxieties about her asexuality, describing it as a real problem asexual people experience. She appreciated too that it depicted Parvati as someone interested in romance, noting how many believe that asexuality means aromantic as well, and voicing further praise for how involved the player is with her romance. GamePro writer Eleen Reinke stated Parvati as the first character they saw themselves in. They cited different elements, such as her asexuality, queer romanticism, and anxiety when confessing to Junlei. They also discussed the perception of asexual people being inherently aromantic, and how Parvati's depiction dispels that notion.
